= Turkish cuisine =

Culinary traditions of Turkey

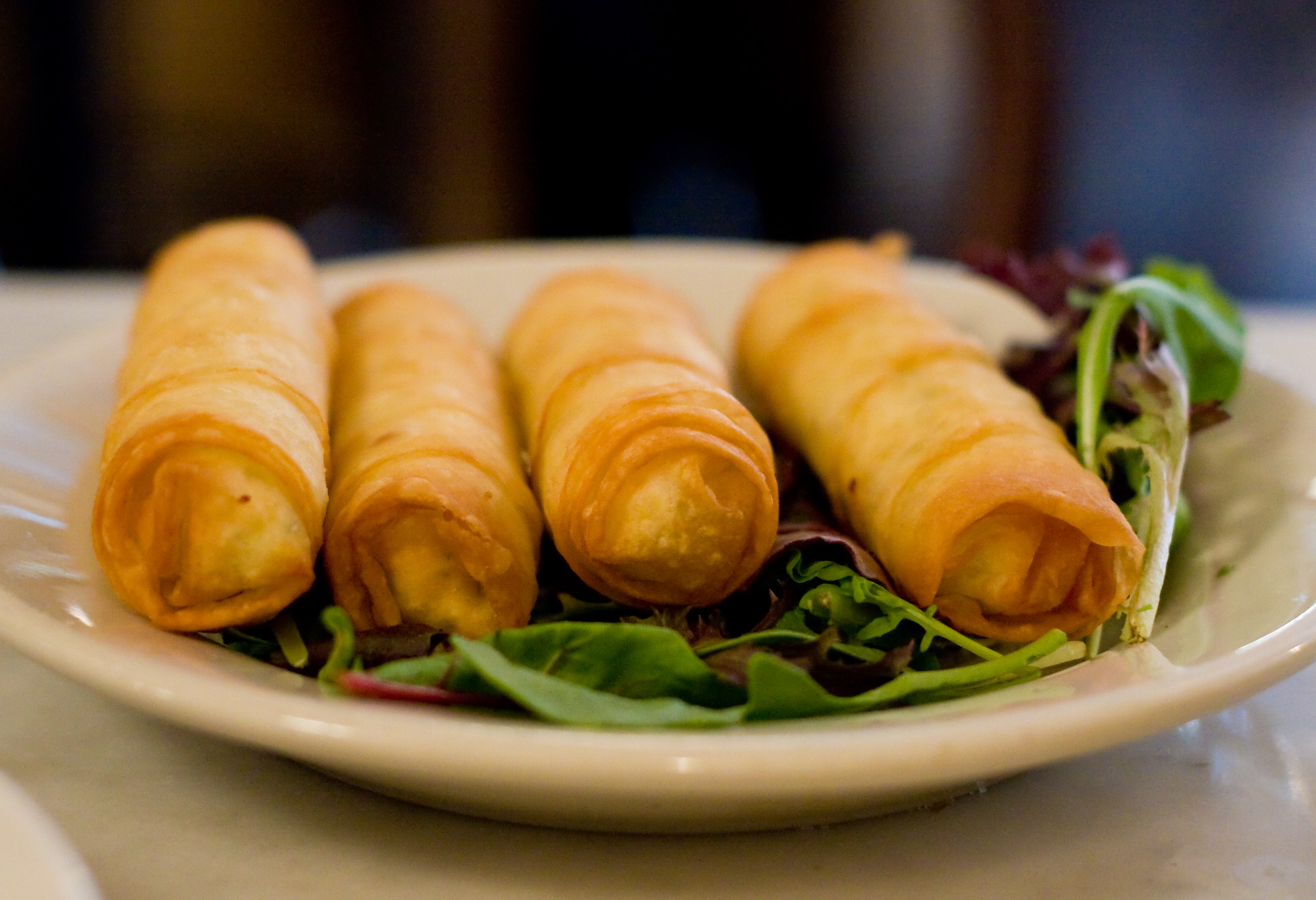
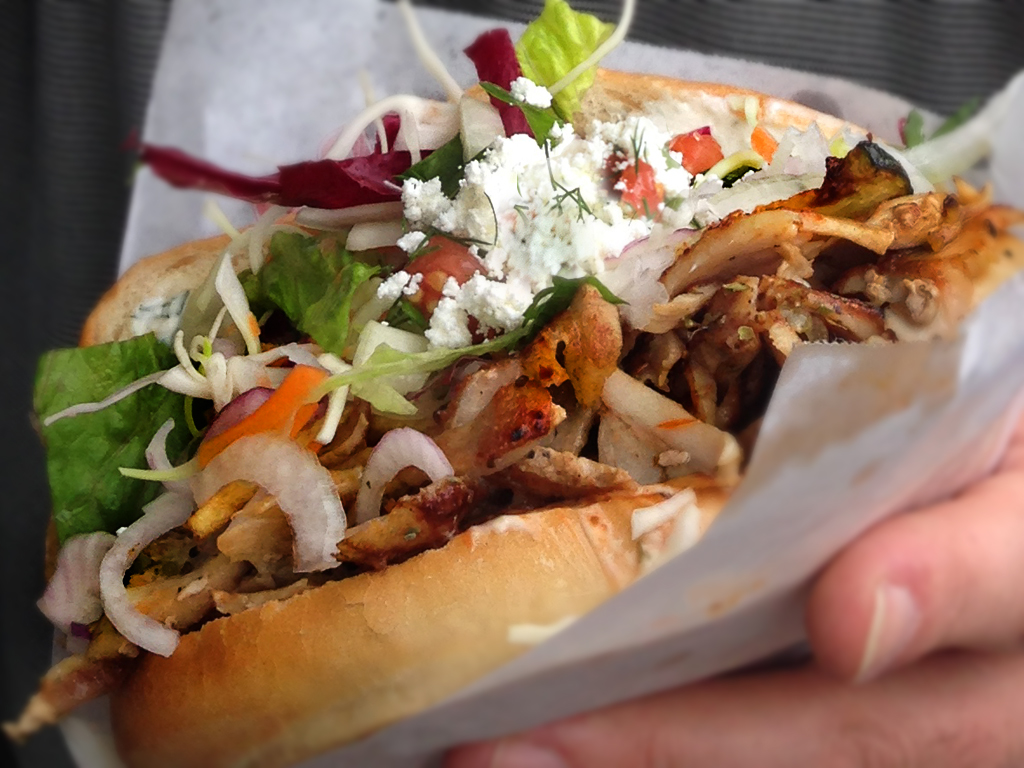
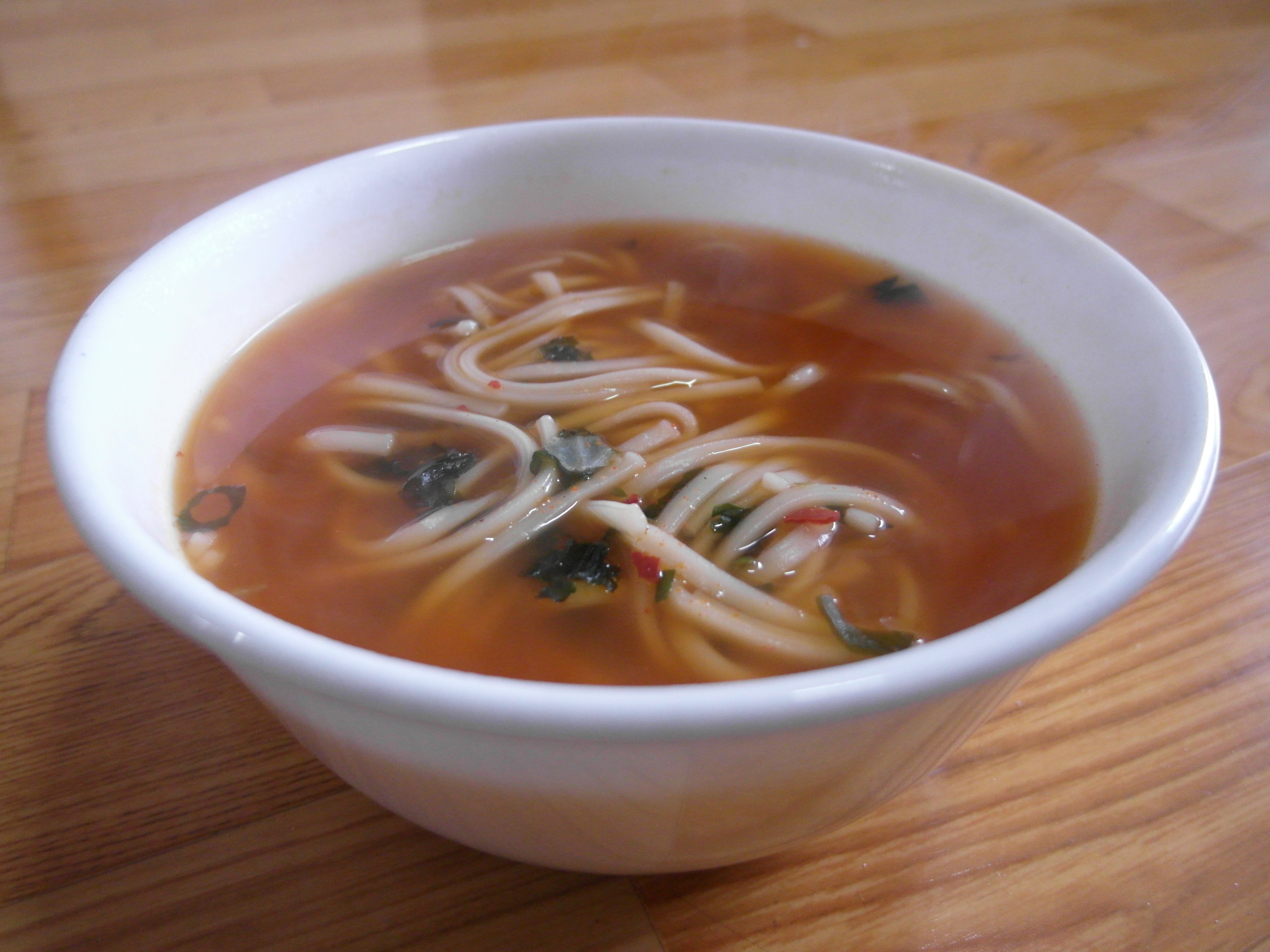
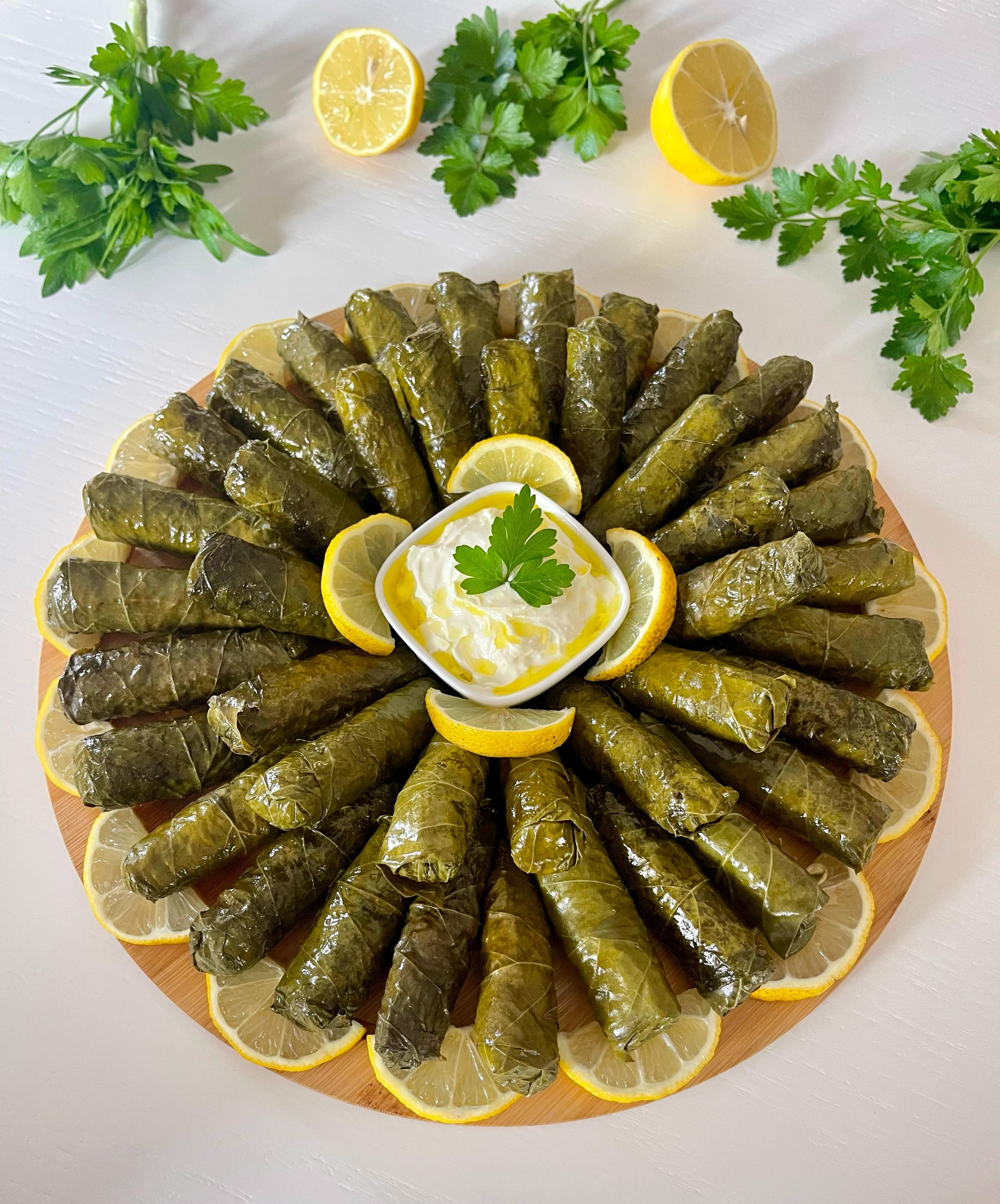
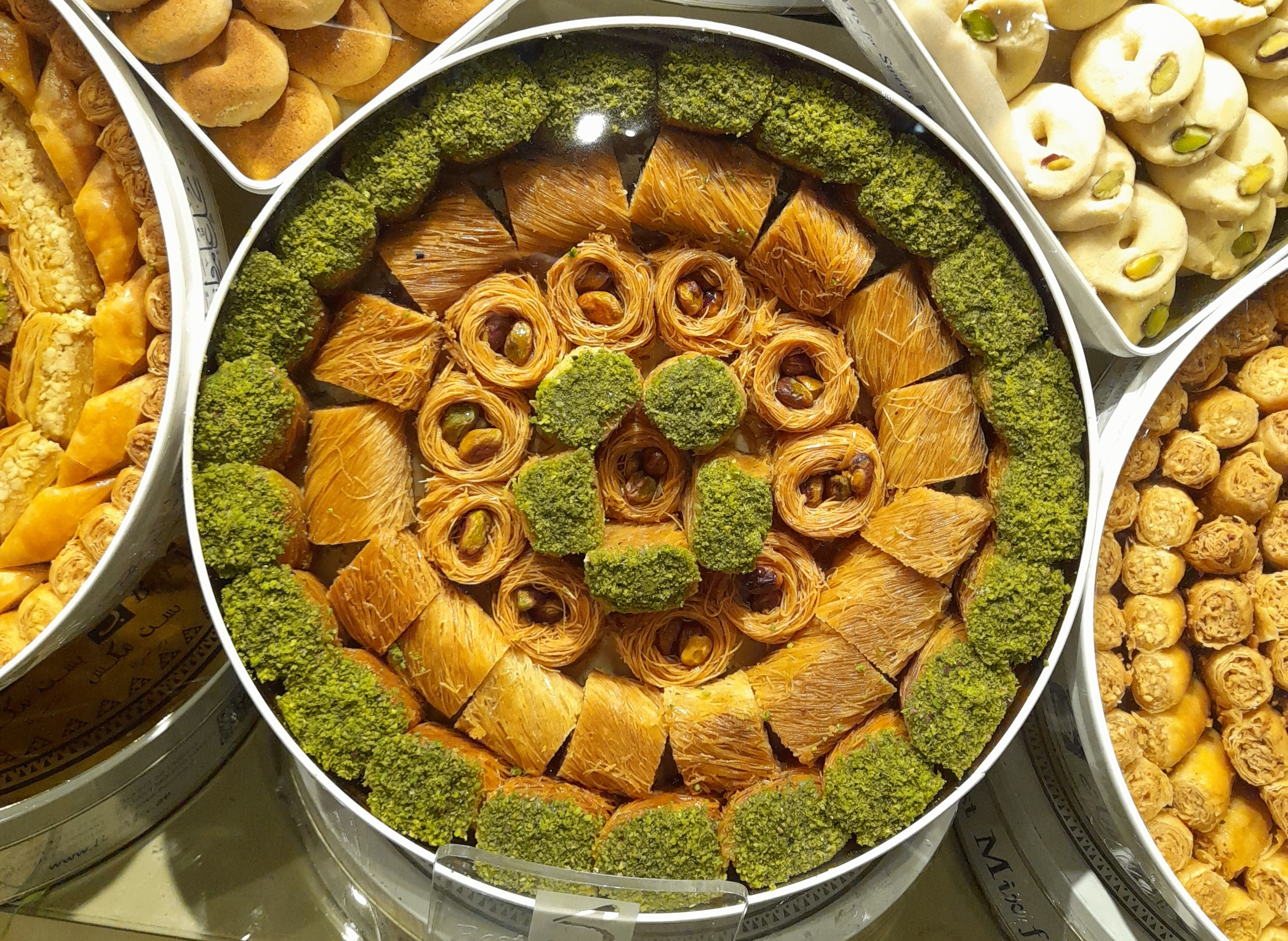
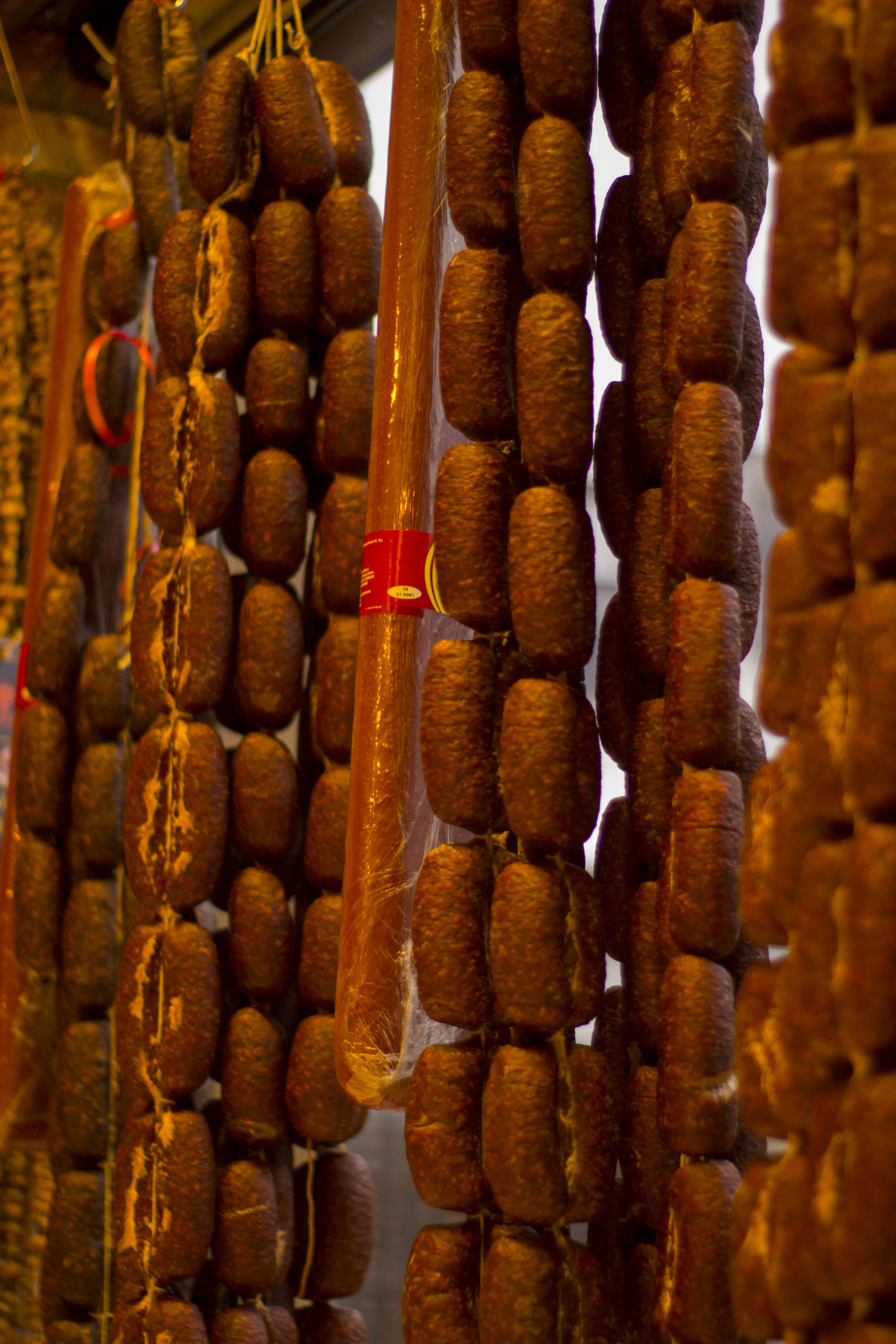
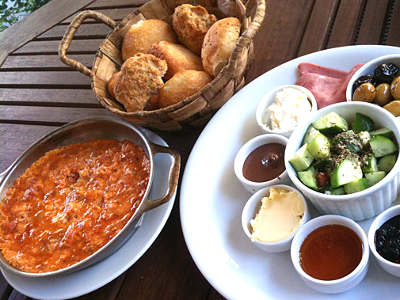
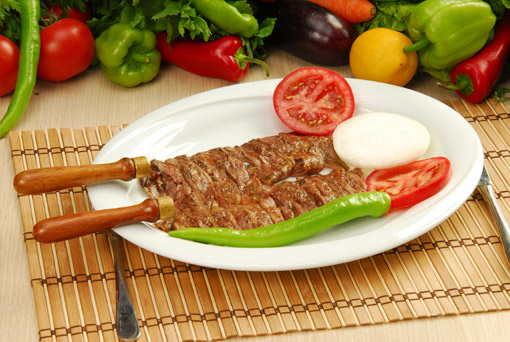
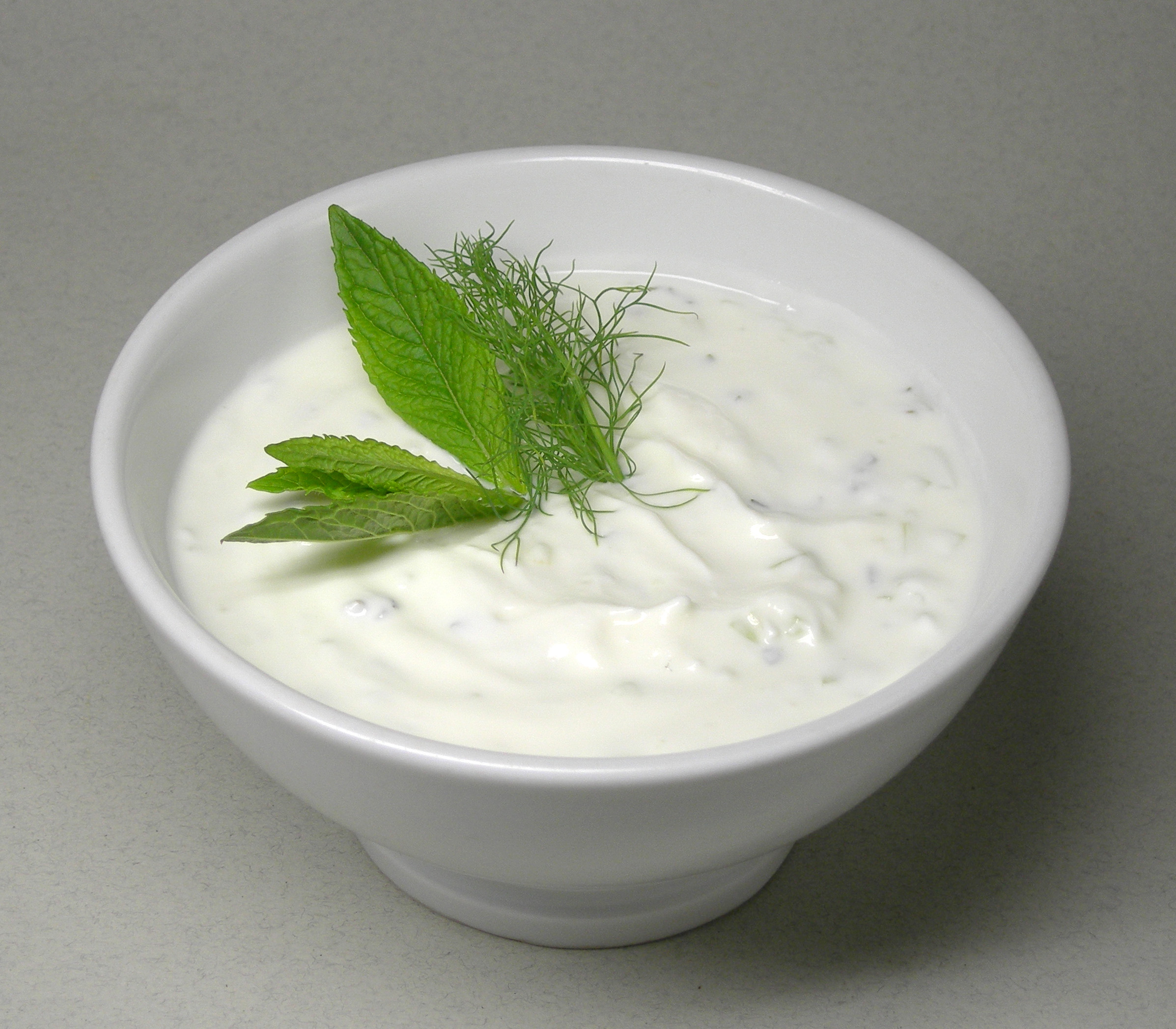
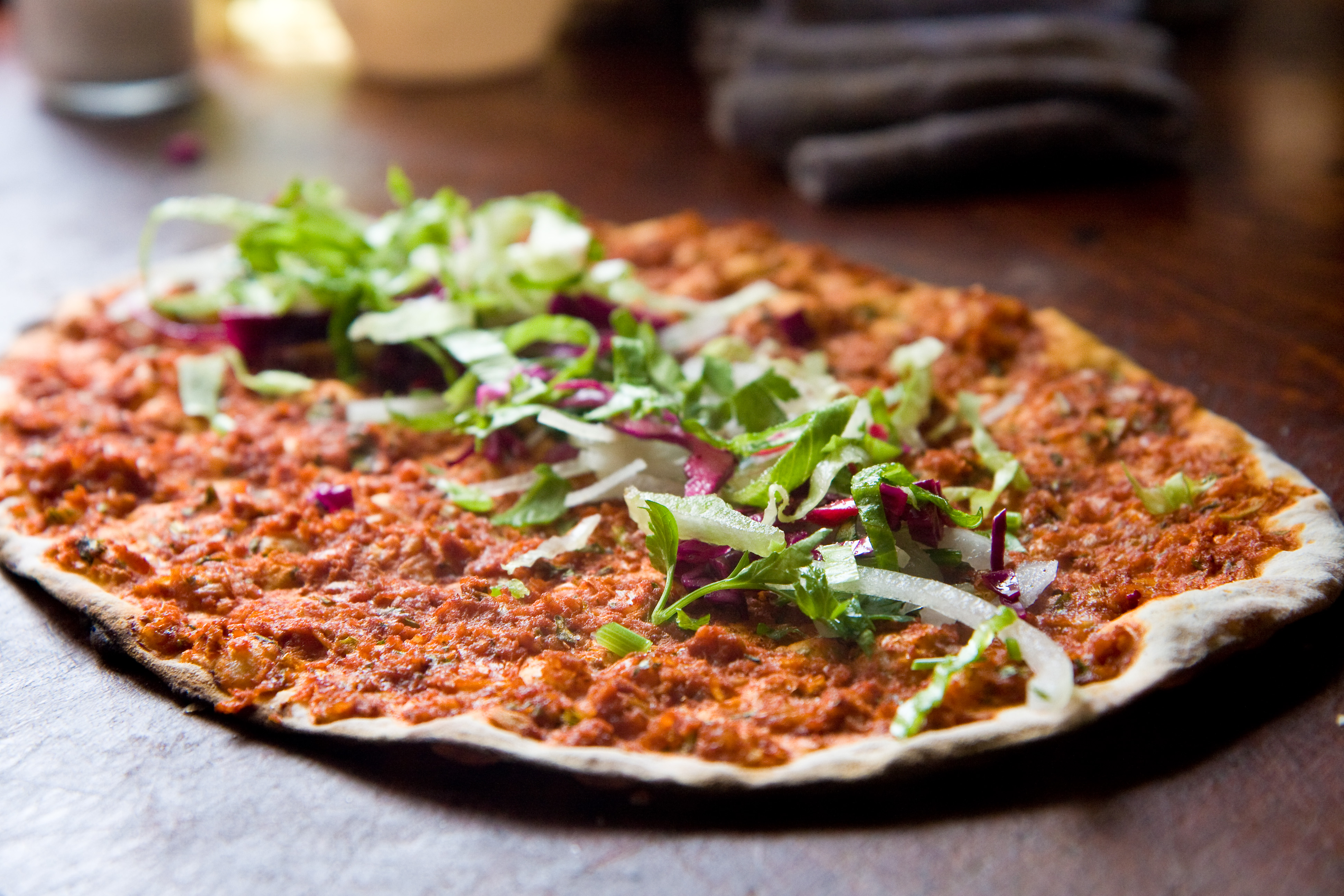
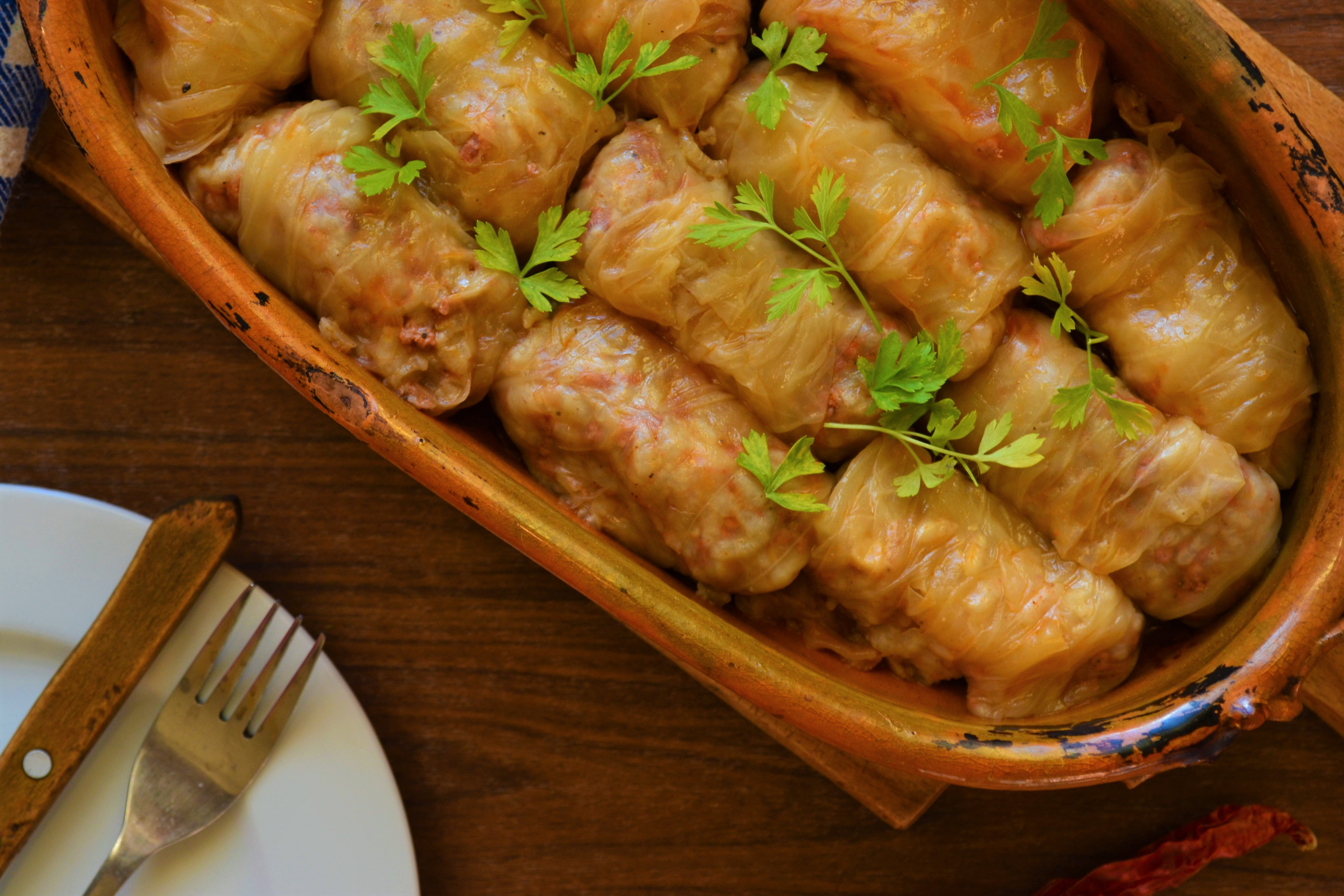
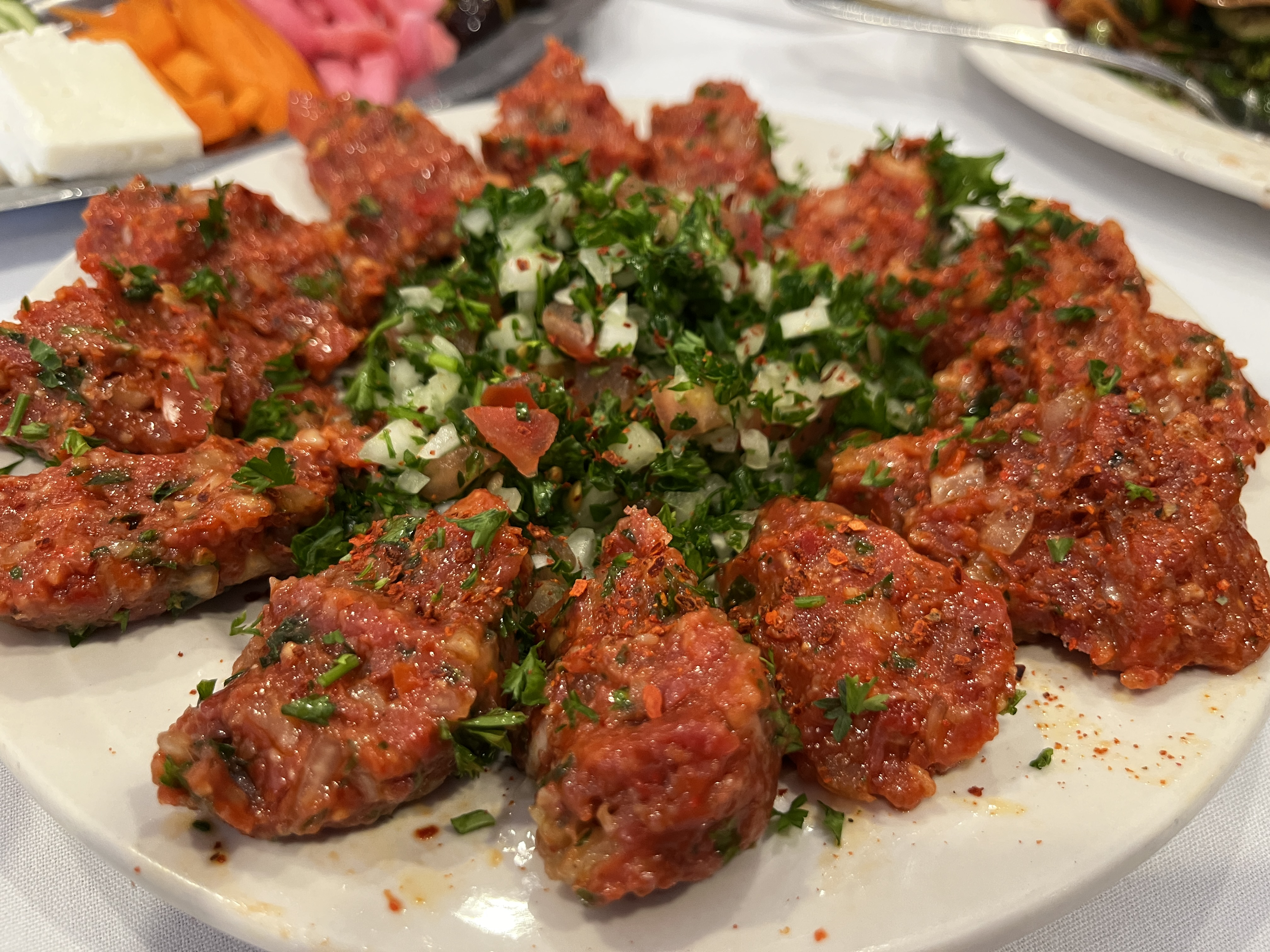
An assortment of Turkish cuisine
From top left; Sigara böreği, döner kebap, erişte çorbası, yaprak sarması, baklava, sucuk, menemen, cağ kebabı, cacık, lahmacun, lahana dolması, çiğ köfte

Turkish cuisine (Turkish: Türk mutfağı) encompasses the traditional and regional foods of Turkey and its diaspora. It developed primarily from Ottoman cuisine, which synthesized Central Asian culinary traditions with Mediterranean and Middle Eastern influences. During the Ottoman period, Turkish cuisine played a central role in influencing the cuisines of the former Ottoman territories, particularly in the Balkans, the Levant, Mesopotamia, North Africa, the South Caucasus and Crimea, resulting in a shared culinary heritage.

The cooking of Istanbul, Bursa, İzmir, and the rest of the Anatolia region inherits many elements of Ottoman court cuisine, including moderate use of spices, a preference for rice over bulgur, koftes, and a wider availability of vegetable stews (türlü), eggplant and stuffed dolmas. The cuisine of the Black Sea region uses fish extensively, especially the Black Sea anchovy (hamsi) and includes maize dishes. The cuisine of the southeast (including Urfa, Gaziantep, Adıyaman and Adana) is famous for its variety of kebabs, mezes and dough-based desserts such as baklava, şöbiyet, kadayıf, katmer and künefe.

Especially in the western parts of Turkey, where olive trees grow abundantly, olive oil is the primary type of cooking oil. The cuisines of the Aegean, Marmara and Mediterranean regions are rich in vegetables, herbs, and fish. Central Anatolia has many well-known specialties, such as keşkek, mantı (especially from Kayseri) and gözleme. Food names directly cognate with mantı are also found in Chinese (mantou or steamed bun), and it is generally considered to have originated in Mongolia during the 13th century.

Specialties are often named for places, and may refer to different styles of preparation. For example, Urfa kebap is less spicy and thicker than Adana kebap. Although meat-based foods such as kebabs are common in Turkish cuisine abroad, meals in Turkey largely center around rice, vegetables, and bread.

== History ==
In the early years of the republic, a few studies were published about regional Anatolian dishes, but cuisine did not feature heavily in Turkish folkloric studies until the 1980s when the fledgling tourism industry encouraged the Turkish state to sponsor two food symposia. The papers submitted at the symposia presented the history of Turkish cuisine on a "historical continuum" that dated back to Turkic origins in Central Asia and continued through the Seljuk and Ottoman periods.

Prior to the symposia, the study of Turkish culinary culture was first popularized by the publication of Süheyl Ünver's Fifty Dishes in Turkish History in 1948. This book was based on recipes found in an 18th-century Ottoman manuscript. His second book was about the 15th century palace cuisine during the reign of Sultan Mehmed II. Following the publication of Ünver's book, subsequent studies were published, including a 1978 study by historian Bahaettin Ögel about the Central Asian origins of Turkish cuisine.

== Culinary customs ==
=== Breakfast ===
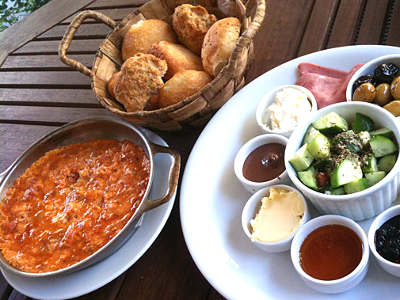
Menemen (left) and a classic Turkish breakfast platter

A traditional Turkish breakfast is rich in variety. A typical serving consists of cheese (such as white cheese, kashar, and others), butter, olives, eggs, muhammara, tomatoes, cucumbers, jam, honey, kaymak, sucuk (optionally spicy Turkish sausage), pastırma, börek, simit, poğaça, açma, fried dough (pişi), and various soups may be eaten as a morning meal in Turkey. A specialty for breakfast is menemen, prepared with tomatoes, green peppers, onion, olive oil and eggs. The breakfast menu can also include kuymak (depending on the province the dish is also known as muhlama, mıhlama and yağlaş) or egg with spinach or potato. Another specialty is the Balkan Turkish dish çılbır, also known as Turkish eggs, made with poached eggs and yogurt. Invariably, Turkish tea is served at breakfast. The Turkish word for breakfast, kahvaltı, means "before coffee".

=== Homemade food ===
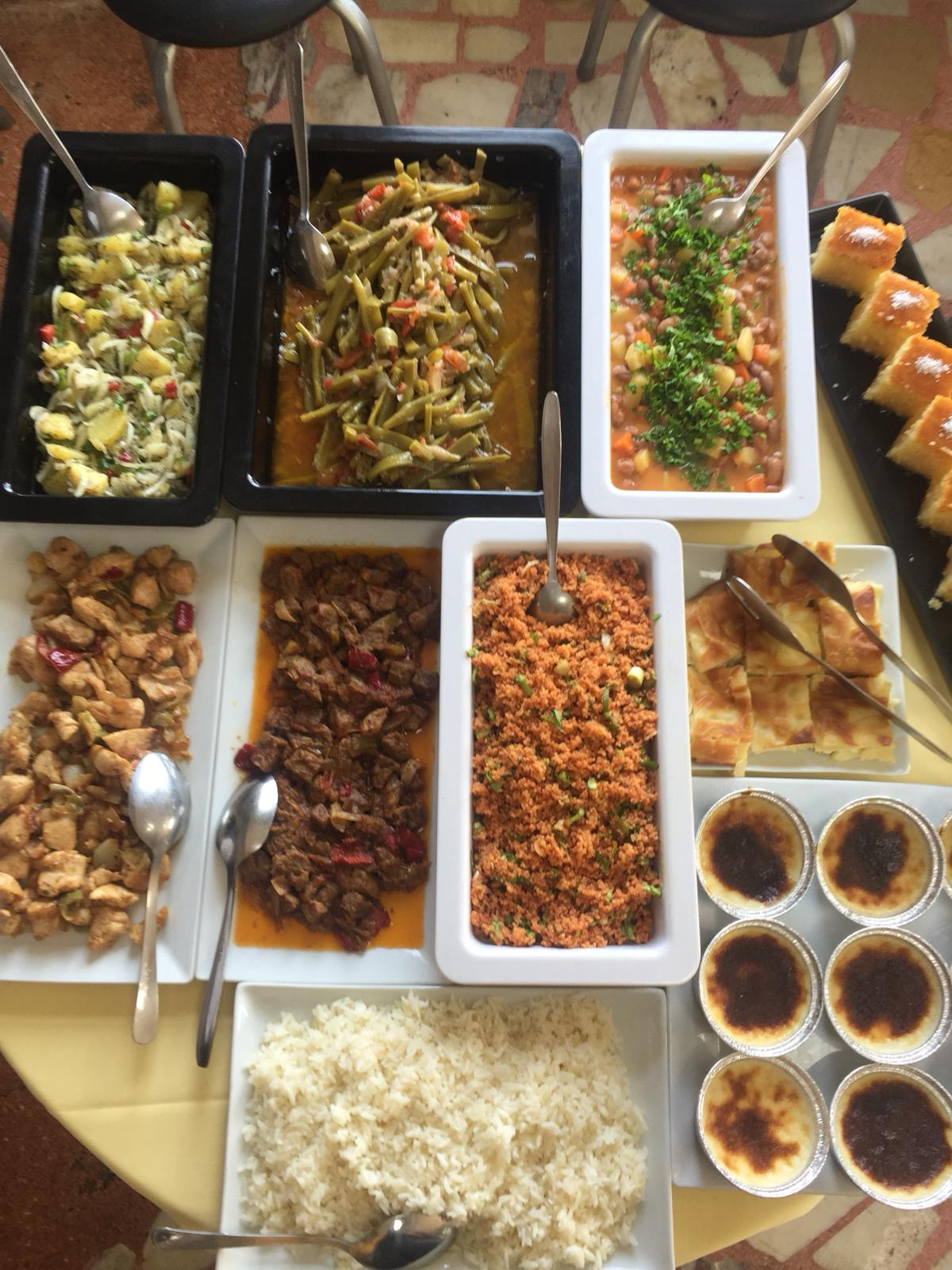
Some homemade food selections

Homemade food is still preferred by Turkish people. A typical meal starts with soup (especially in wintertime), followed by a dish made of vegetables (with olive oil or ground meat), boiled meat or legumes (typically cooked with meat), often with or before Turkish pilav, pasta or bulgur pilav accompanied by a salad or cacık (a diluted cold yogurt dish with garlic, salt, and cucumber slices). In summertime many prefer a cold dish of vegetables cooked with olive oil (zeytinyağlı yemekler) instead of soup, either before or after the main course, which can also be a chicken, meat or fish plate.

=== Restaurants ===
Esnaf lokantası, a typically modest restaurant that provides home-made, traditional dishes (such as bulgur, stew, dolma, lentil soup) in variety with relatively reasonable prices is found across the provinces of Turkiye. It is specifically favoured by male workers, provided that meals are often served before sunrise that is before the shifts and is suitable for lower-wage payees to afford. Many restaurants are specialized in certain foods; such as köfte, döner, kokoreç, kumpir, midye tava, börek and gözleme. Eating out has always been common in cities. Fast food is gaining popularity and many major foreign fast-food chains have opened all over Turkey.

=== Summer cuisine ===
In the hot Turkish summer, a meal often consists of fried vegetables such as patlıcan (eggplant/aubergine) and peppers or potatoes served with yogurt or tomato sauce. Menemen and çılbır are typical summer dishes based on eggs. Sheep cheese, cucumbers, tomatoes, watermelons and melons also make a light summer meal. Those who like helva for dessert prefer "summer helva", which is lighter and less sweet than the regular version.

=== Key ingredients ===
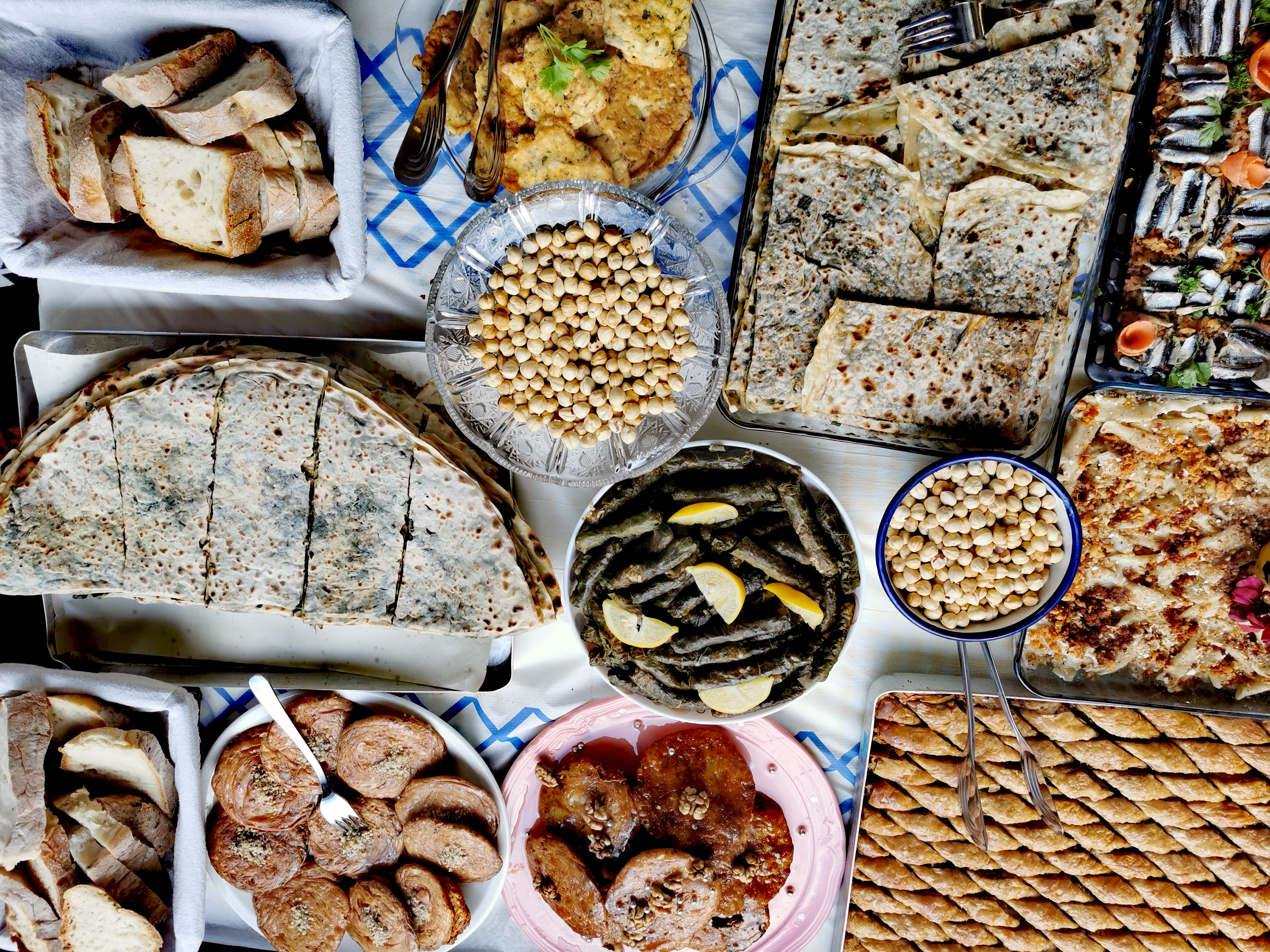
Assortment of Turkish food

Frequently used ingredients in Turkish specialties include lamb, chicken, beef, fish, rice, eggplants, green peppers, onions, garlic, lentils, beans, zucchinis, chickpeas and tomatoes. The average beef consumption per person per year is 15 kilograms (33 lb). Nuts, especially pistachios, chestnuts, almonds, hazelnuts, and walnuts, together with spices, have a special place in Turkish cuisine, and are used extensively in desserts or eaten separately. About 1.5 kg of pistachios are eaten per person per year, some packaged and some used in desserts such as baklava. Tahini is a common sauce made from sesame seeds, sold both pre-packaged or in bulk on tap. Semolina flour is used to make a cake called revani and irmik helvasi.

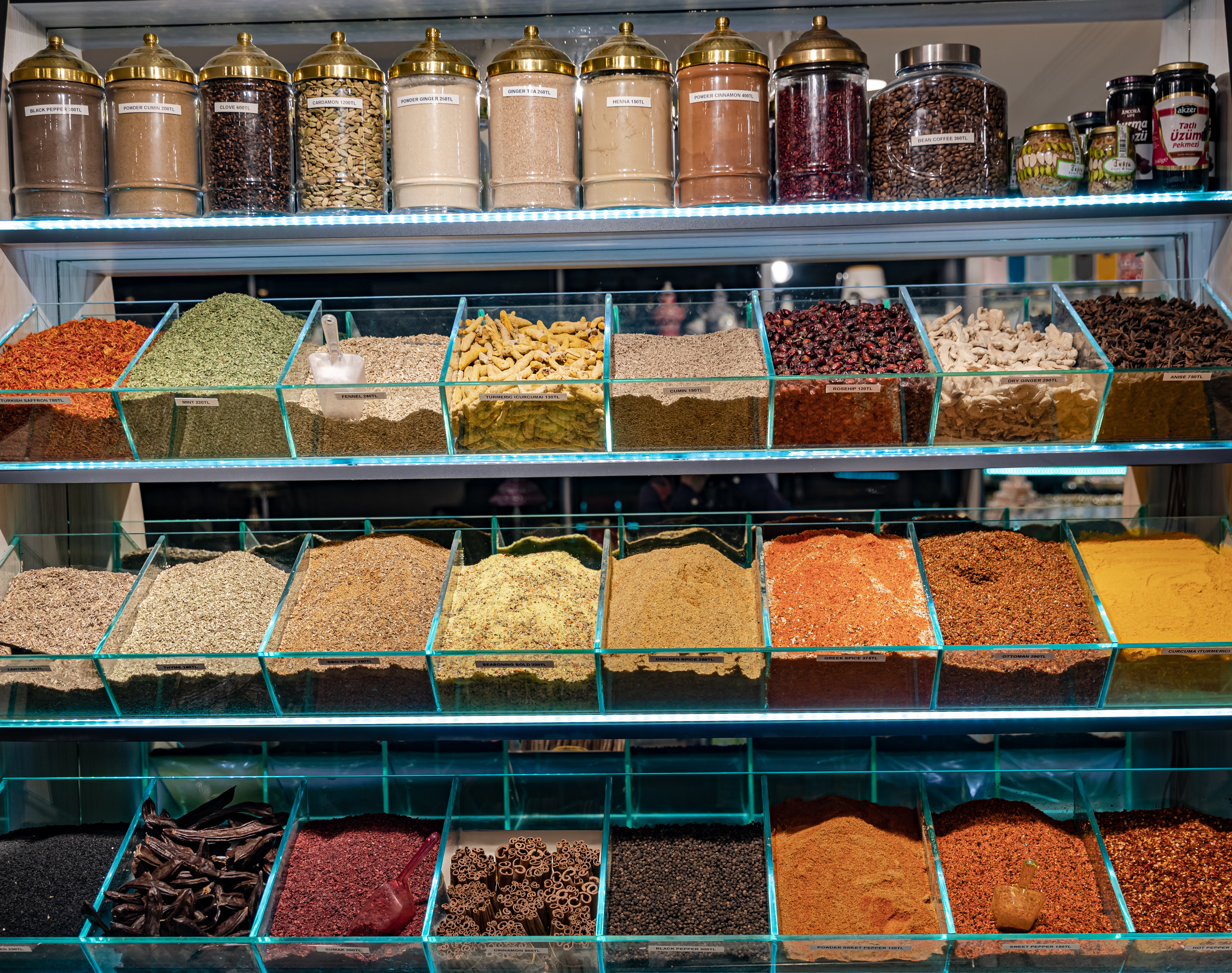
Spices

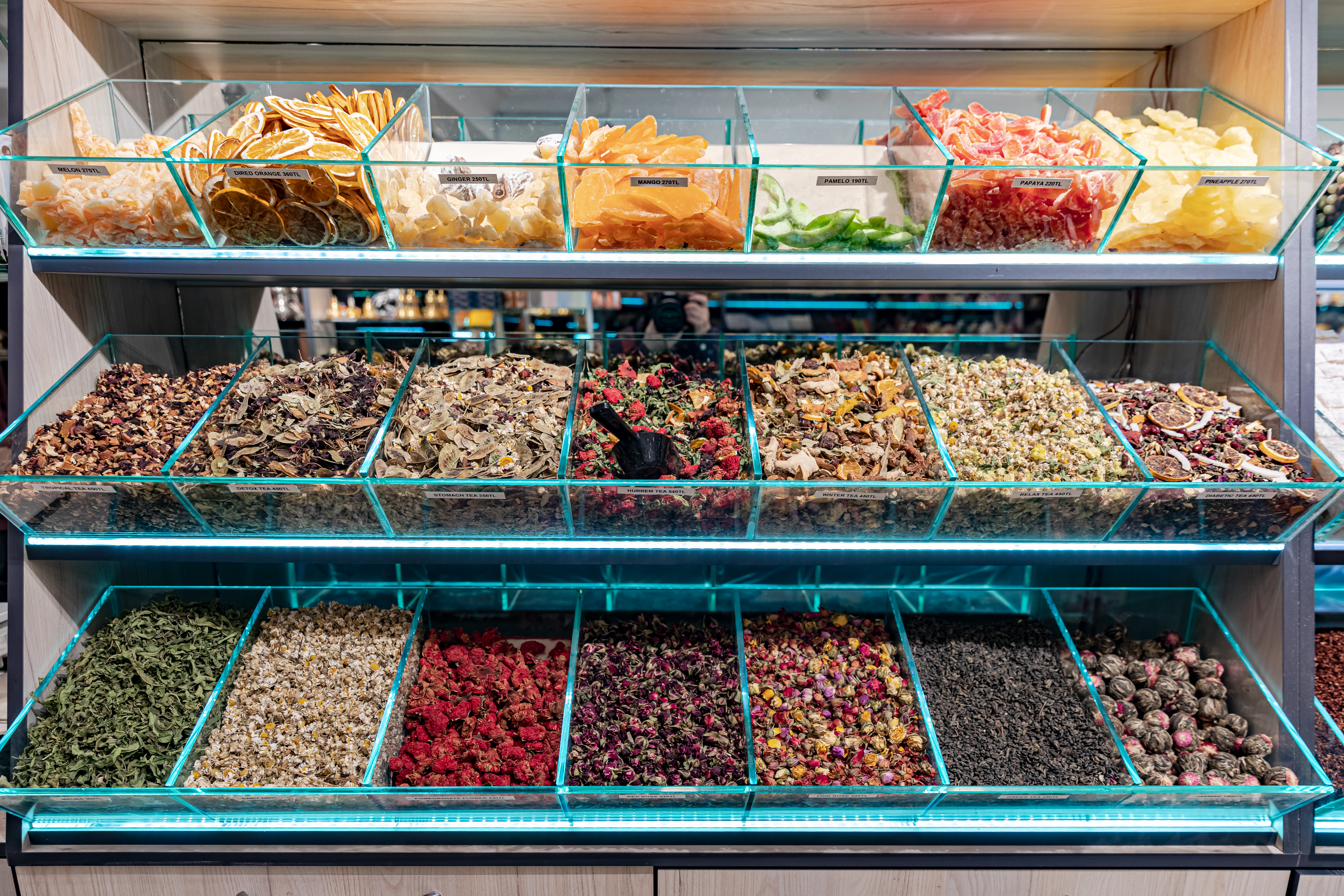
Herbs

Commonly used spices and flavorings:
Name	Turkish	Used in	References
Allspice	Yenibahar or dolma bahar	Dolma, vegetables, pilav, fish, köfte	
Anise	Anason	Peksimet, rakı, used to season nut and dried fruit mixtures in both sweet and savory dishes	
Black pepper	Kara biber	Egg dishes, meat dishes, laz böreği	
Cardamom	Kakule	Rarely used, mostly in coffee. A common ingredient in Persian and Indian desserts, Turkish variations usually replace it with vanilla and rosewater.	
Cinnamon	Tarçın	Desserts, pastries, salep, boza, iç pilav, fish, lamb, vegetables, tomato sauces, milk puddings, desserts	
Clove	Karanfil	Fruit compotes, spiced black tea, meat casseroles, sweets, breads, pastries	
Coriander	Kişniş	Extremely rare. Used in some fish and meat dishes, particularly in southern and eastern Anatolia.	
Cumin	Kimyon	Kofta spice, pastirma, lentil soup	
Fenugreek	Çemen otu	Vegetables, fish, breads, pastirma	
Isot	Urfa biberi	Ciğ köfte	
Mahlep	Mahlep	Baked goods	
Mastic	Sakız	Used in milk desserts, ice cream, Turkish delight	
Nigella seeds	Çörek otu	Savory pastries, homemade cheese. Can be mixed with coriander, cumin and haspir to make a spice for fish.	
Red pepper	Kırmızı biber, pul biber	Garnish for soups, manti, Adana kebab	
Rose water	Gül suyu,	Su muhallebisi, güllaç, aşure	
Poppy seeds	Haşhaş	Bread, rolls, meat, fish, light sauces and yogurt dressings	
Safflower	Yalancı safran (fake saffron)	Used primarily in the regional cuisine of Gaziantep to give yogurt soups a saffron-like tint	
Saffron	zafiran	Zerde, pilav	
Salep	Salep	A winter beverage made with milk, vanilla, sugar and starch; tastes like warm liquid vanilla pudding. Originally it was thickened with these ground wild orchid roots.	
Sesame seeds	Susam	Simit, tahini, helva	
Sumac	Sumak	Juice from sumac berries can be used in a marinade for fish or chicken. Ground sumac can be used to season salads, pilav and soups. A spice mix of sumac, dried thyme and roasted sesame seeds is used with grilled meats.	

Olives are also common on various breakfast and meze tables. Beyaz peynir and yoğurt are part of many dishes including börek, manti, kebab and cacık.

=== Oils and fats ===
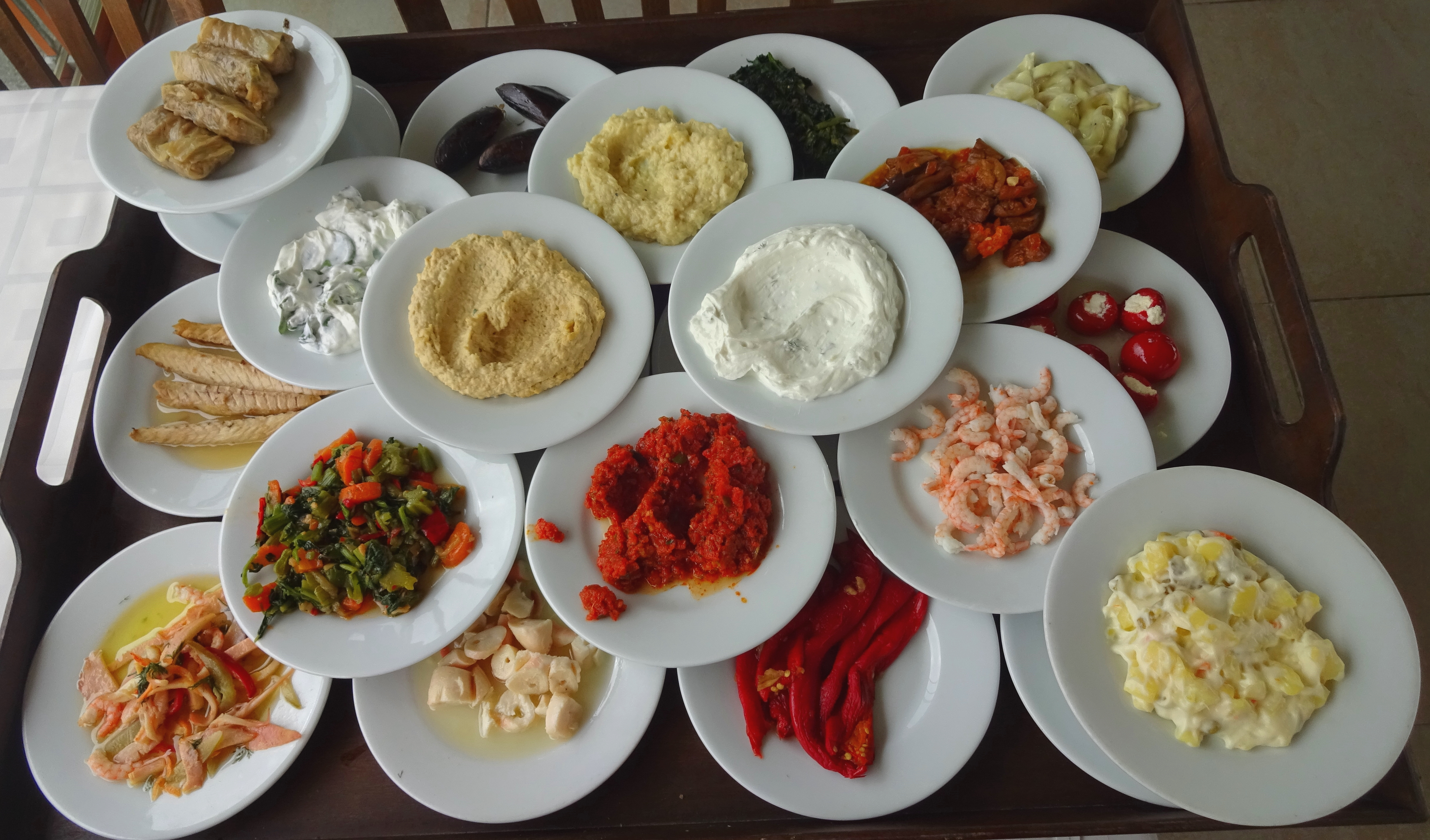
Meze from Turkey uses different types of oil.

Butter, olive oil, sunflower oil, canola oil, and corn oil are widely used for cooking. Sesame, hazelnut, peanut and walnut oils are used as well. Kuyruk yağı (tail fat of sheep) is sometimes used in kebabs and meat dishes.

=== Fruit ===
The diverse flora of Turkey means that fruit is varied, abundant and cheap. In Ottoman cuisine, fruit frequently accompanied meat as a side dish. Plums, apricots, pomegranates, pears, apples, grapes, figs and quinces along with many kinds of citrus are the most frequently used fruit, either fresh or dried, in Turkish cuisine. For example, komposto (compote) or hoşaf (from Persian khosh âb, literally meaning "nice water") are among the main side dishes to meat or pilav. Dolma and pilav usually contain currants or raisins. Etli yaprak sarma (vine leaves stuffed with meat and rice) used to be cooked with sour plums in Ottoman cuisine. Turkish desserts do not normally contain fresh fruit, but may contain dried varieties.

=== Meats ===
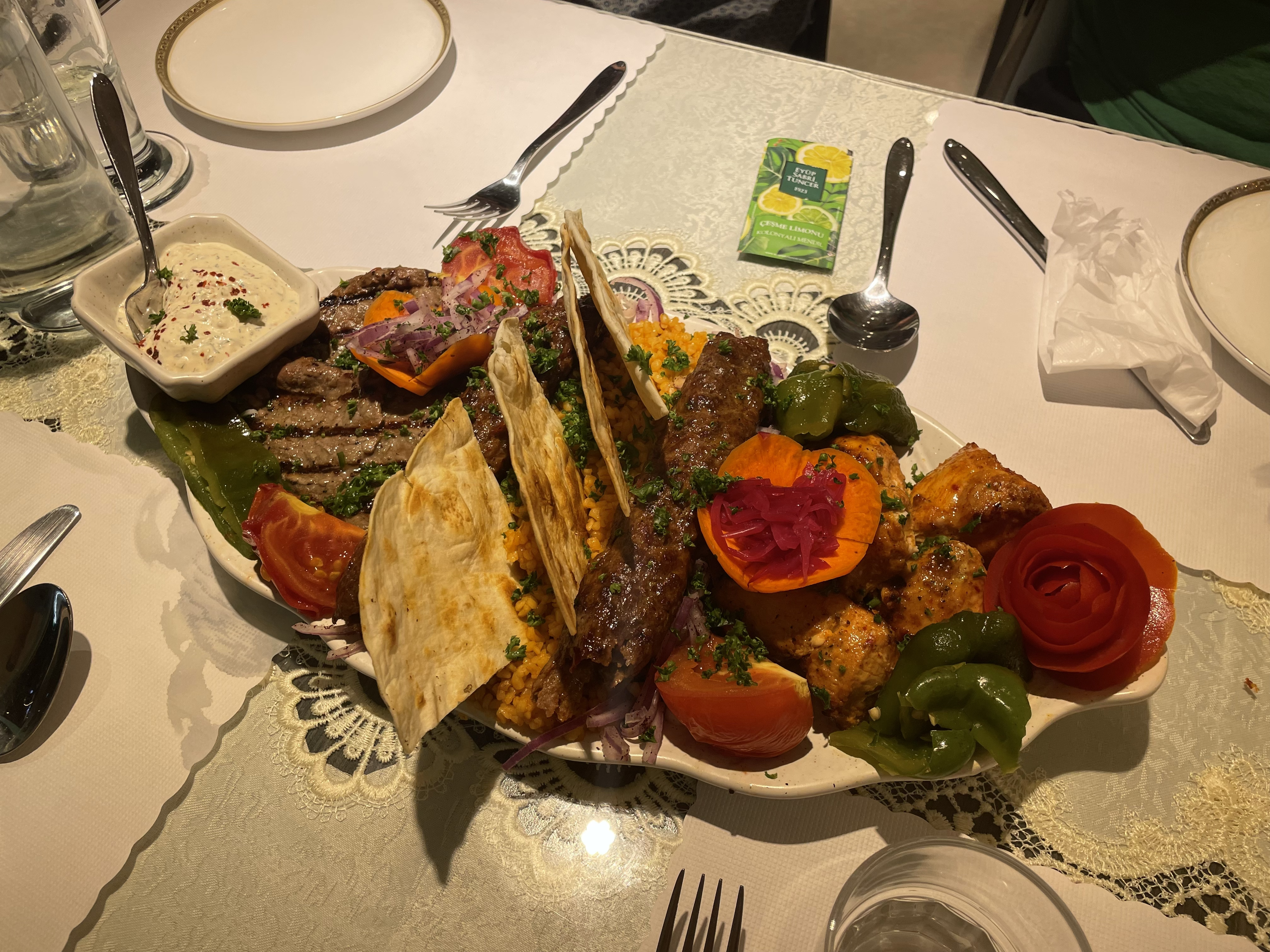
Mix platter of kebab including Adana kebap and şiş kebap

The main use of meat in cooking remains the combination of ground meat and vegetable, with names such as kıymalı fasulye (beans with ground meat) or kıymalı ıspanak (spinach with ground meat, which is sometimes served with yoğurt).

Alternatively, in coastal towns cheap fish such as sardalya (sardines) or hamsi (anchovies) are widely available, as well as many others with seasonal availability. Poultry consumption, almost exclusively of chicken and eggs, is common. Milk-fed lambs, once the most popular source of meat in Turkey, comprise a small part of contemporary consumption. Kuzu çevirme, cooking milk-fed lamb on a spit, once an important ceremony, is rarely seen.

Pork is available in some stores but is not commonly eaten since most Turks are Muslims.

== Dishes and foods ==
=== Dairy products ===
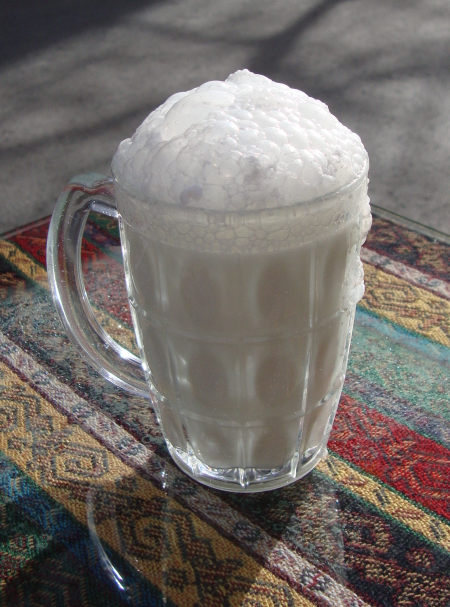
Fresh ayran with a head of foam

Yoğurt is an important element in Turkish cuisine. In fact, the English word yogurt or yoghurt derives from the Turkish word yoğurt. Yoğurt can accompany almost all meat dishes (kebabs, köfte), vegetable dishes (especially fried eggplant, courgette, and spinach with minced meat, along with others), meze, and mantı (folded triangles of dough containing minced meat). In villages, yoğurt is regularly eaten with pilav or bread. A thicker, higher-fat variety, süzme yoğurt or "strained yogurt", is made by straining the yoğurt curds from the whey. One of the most common Turkish drinks, ayran, is made from yoğurt. Also, yoğurt is often used in the preparation of cakes, some soups and pastries. Keş (kashk) is a fermented and strained sour yogurt that can be consumed on its own as a cheese, or used as an ingredient in soups.

==== Cheeses ====
Turkey produces many varieties of cheese, mostly from sheep's milk. In general, these cheeses are not long-matured, with a comparatively low fat content. The production of many kinds of cheese is local to particular regions. There are 193 different cheeses in Turkey, but only 8 of these cheeses have geographical indication.

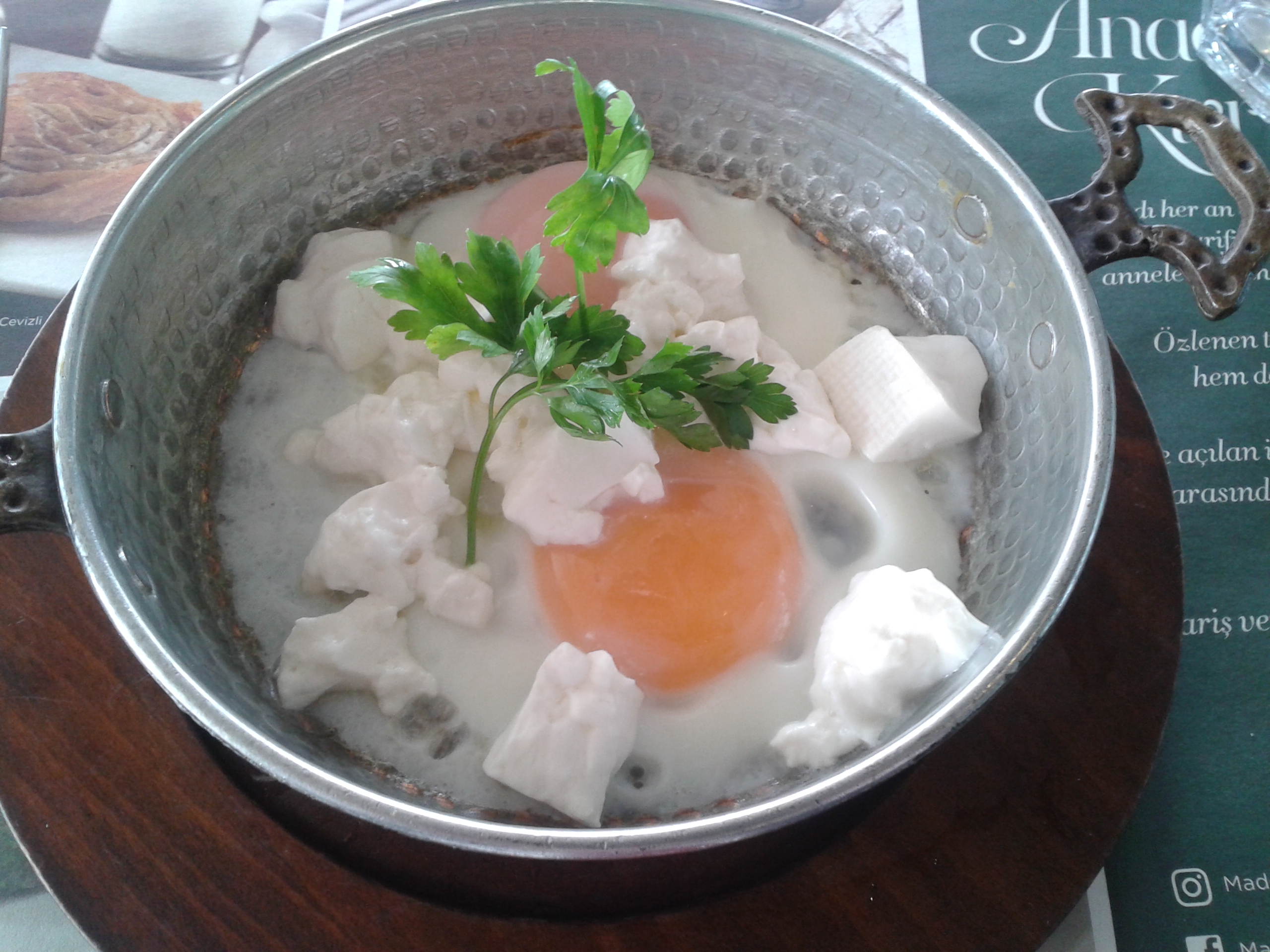
Beyaz peynir with eggs

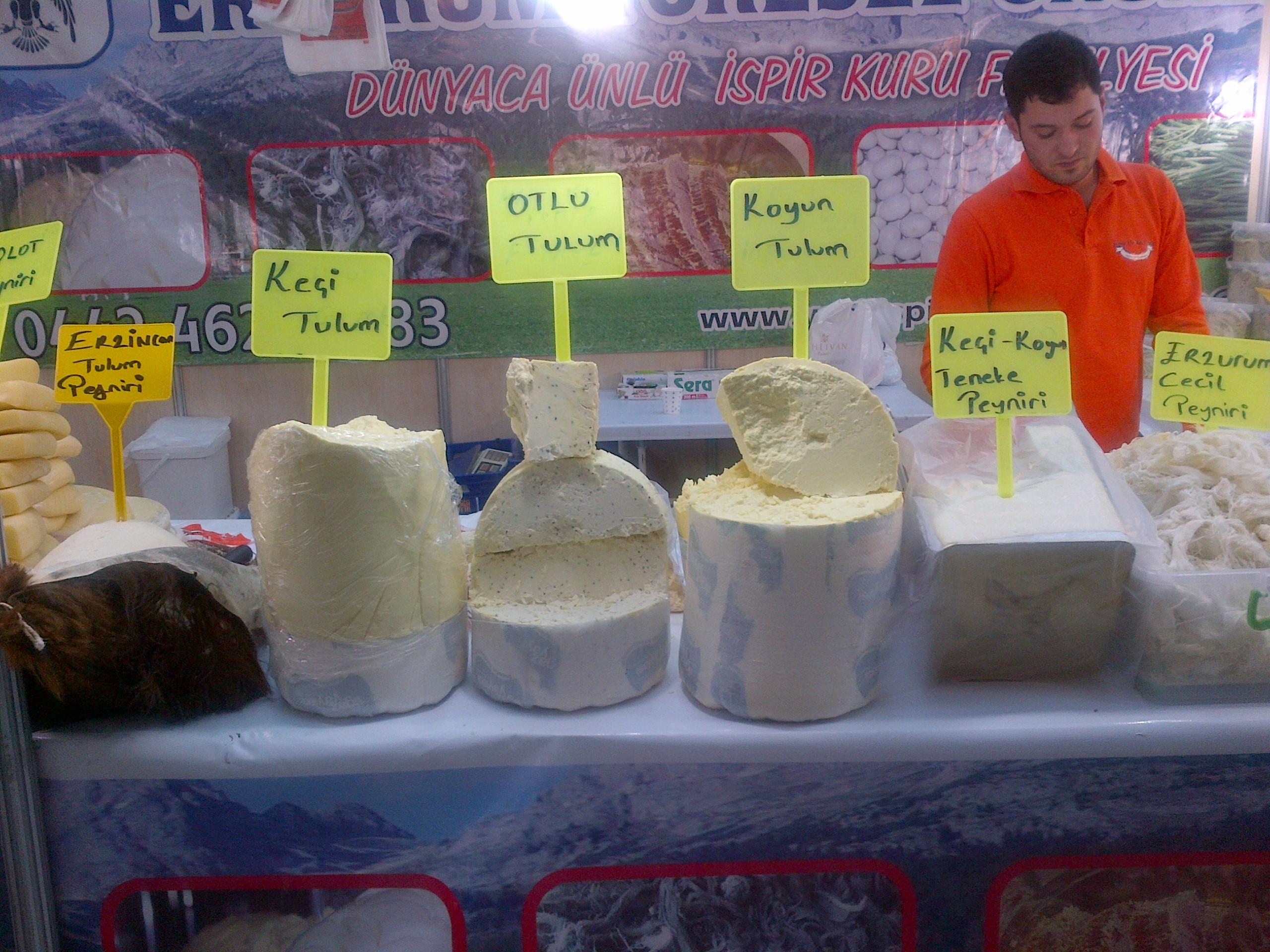
Varieties of tulum: otlu tulum peyniri, or tulum with herbs, in Ankara

- Beyaz peynir – a salty brined cheese taking its name from its white color ("white cheese"). It is similar to feta but not as strong. This is produced in styles ranging from unmatured cheese curds to a strong mature version. It has many varieties due to different sources of milk, regions (Ezine or Thrace) and production methods (classic or cultured). It is eaten plain (for example, as part of the traditional Turkish breakfast), used in salads, and incorporated into cooked foods such as menemen, börek and pide.
- Çerkez peyniri – means "Circassian cheese". It has two variations, smoked or non-smoked.
- Çökelek – is dried cottage cheese. There are many regional varieties of çökelek. Some are eaten fresh while others are preserved, either by storage in goatskin bags or pottery jars, or by drying in the sun.
- Çömlek cheese – is a typical artisanal cheese from Central Anatolia.
- Kurut and keş – are regional names for dried bricks of yogurt made from low-fat milk or from çökelek made from buttermilk.
- Golot cheese – is one of the most important traditional cheeses produced in the region of East Black Sea.
- Gravyer – is produced in Turkey as well. Among others, Kars is famous for this type of cheese.
- Hellim – is a salty, firm-textured goat cheese, generally with some mint added, made in Cyprus. In Turkey, it is common to fry hellim in a pan in some olive oil.
- Kaşar – is Turkey's other ubiquitous cheese made from cow's milk (occasionally mixed with sheep's or goat's milk), sometimes marketed as "Turkish cheddar", being closer in consistency and taste to mild cheddar-style cheese than other Turkish cheeses. Less matured kaşar, called fresh kaşar, is widely consumed as well. Two varieties are popular Kars and Thrace.
- Kaşkaval – is a wheel-shaped yellow sheep's cheese, similar to fresh kaşar. The name comes from Romanian word cașcaval, which bears the Italian structure of caciocavallo.
- Lor – is the other type of unsalted whey cheese, similarly made from the whey left over from kaşar or strained yogurt manufacture. Lor is used in traditional foods and desserts made from unsalted cheese like ekşimik and höşmerim.
- Mihaliç peyniri or Kelle peyniri – is a hard sheep's cheese that can be grated, like Parmesan cheese. Sometimes goat or cow milk is used. It is a specialty from Karacabey, a town in Bursa province which was called Mihaliç during the Byzantine and Ottoman periods. Mostly it is produced from non-pasteurized milk and processed with salt.
- Örgü peyniri (braided cheese) – is a specialty from Diyarbakır.
- Otlu peynir, Van herbed cheese, 'herbed cheese', – is produced in many areas, chiefly in East Anatolia. Traditionally sheep's or goat's milk is used, but more recently cow's milk otlu peynir has been produced. The type of herb used varies by region: in Van wild garlic is traditional; Bitlis otlu peynir contains a damp-loving herb known as sof otu. In other areas horse mint (Mentha longifolia) and Pimpinella rhodentha are used.
- Tulum – is a mostly sheep's curd molded in an animal-skin bag called a tulum. There are regional varieties of tulum peynir in such areas as İzmir, Ödemiş, Elazig and Erzincan, and each of the tulum cheeses have very different characteristics.

=== Desserts ===
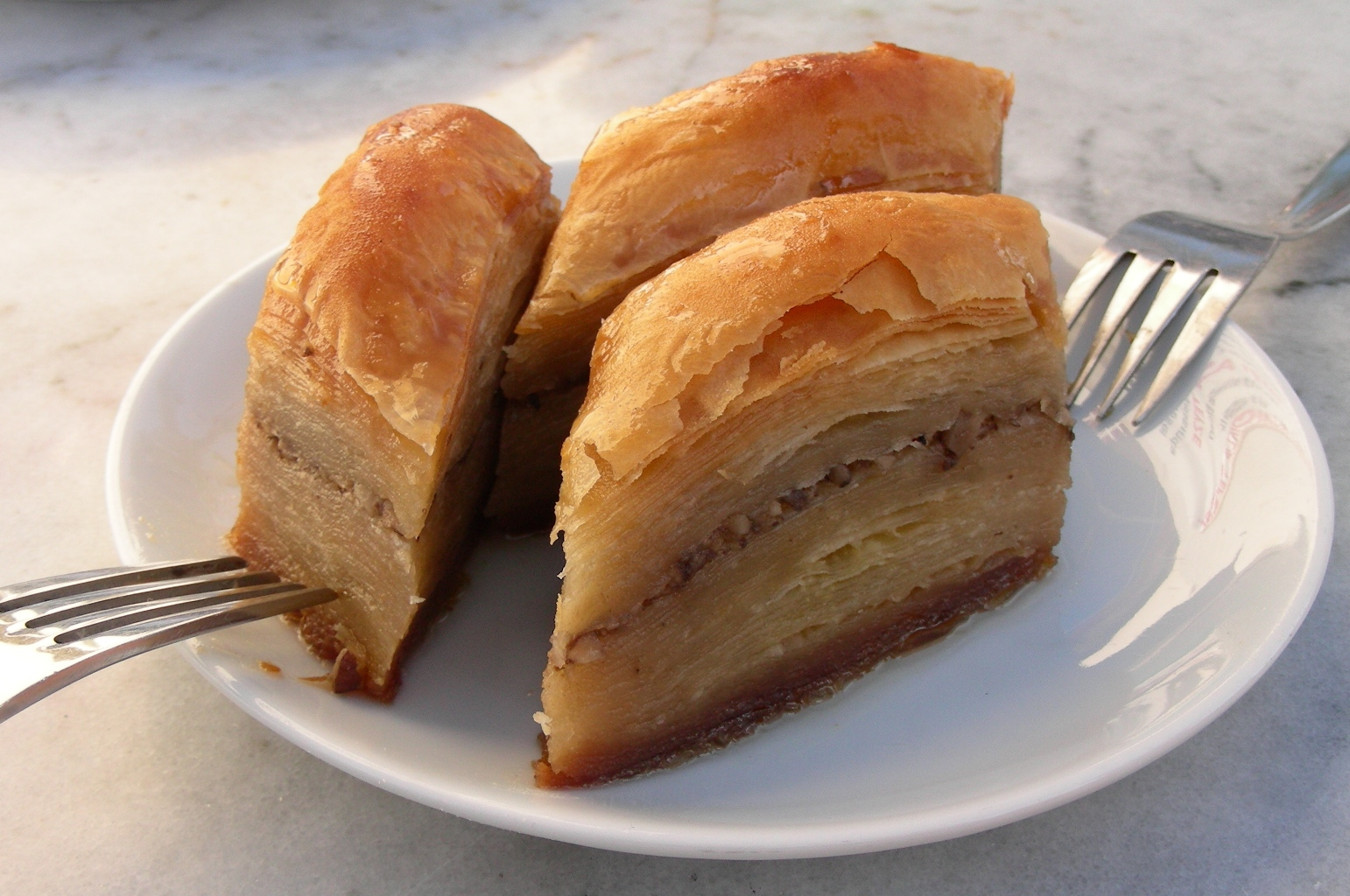
Baklava is prepared on large trays and cut into a variety of shapes.

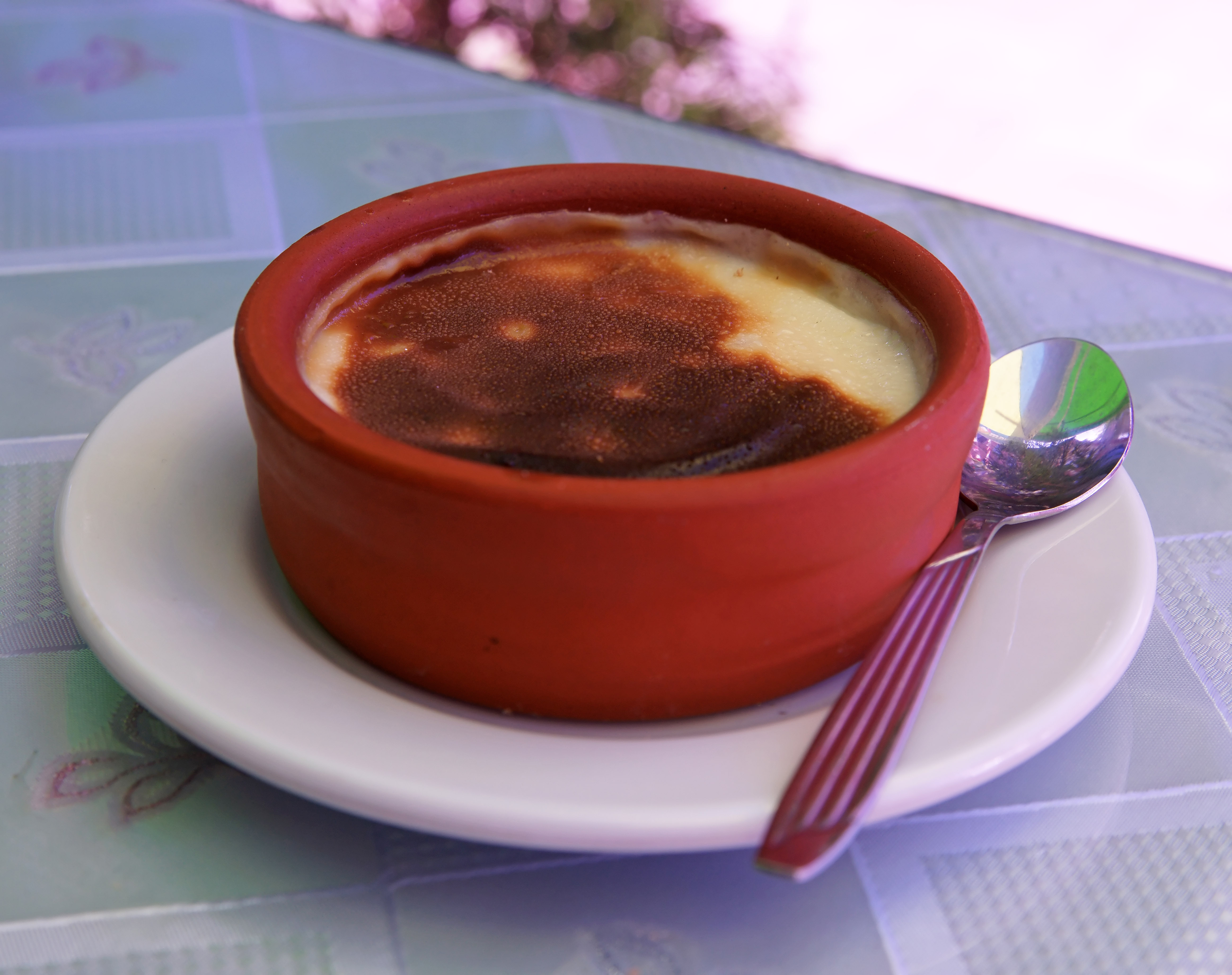
Sütlaç, or Turkish rice pudding

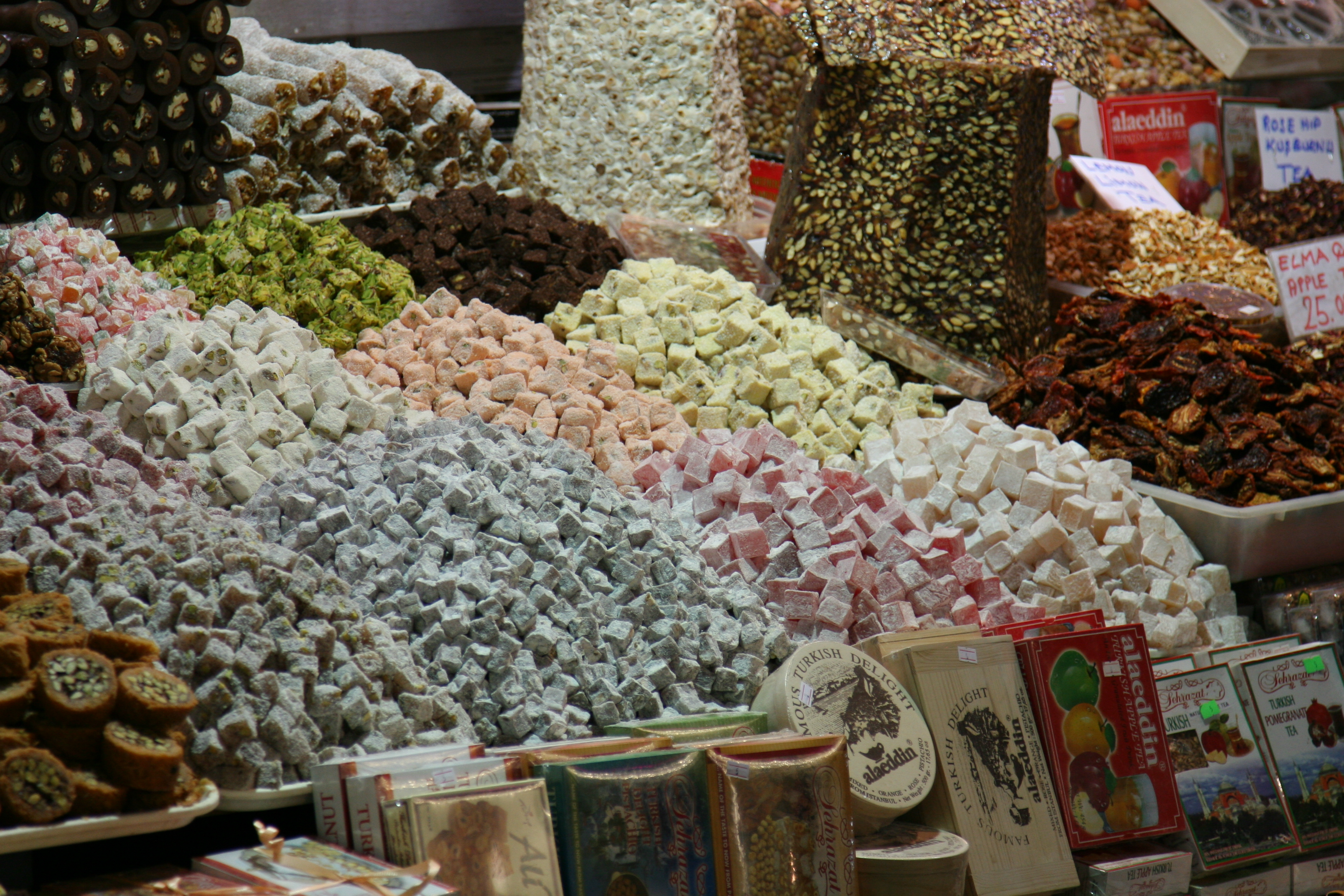
Turkish delight

Cuisine in the late Ottoman Empire was heavily influenced by alafranga-style food, in fashion all over Europe and in Russia in the late 19th century. In the Turkish context it has been regarded as a symbol of Westernization. This influence could still be seen in the earliest cookbooks of the early Republican period like the first edition of the Türk Kadınlar Tatlı Kitabı (Turkish Women's Book of Desserts) which had recipes for Western-style sponge cake (pandispanya), mille-feuille, petit beurre and other Western desserts. The revised edition published in 1966 devoted far more attention to traditional confectionery like şekerpare, baklava and helva.

One of the best-known desserts in Turkish cuisine is baklava. Baklava is made either with pistachios or walnuts. Turkish cuisine has a range of baklava-like desserts which include şöbiyet, bülbül yuvası, sütlü nuriye, and burma.

Kadayıf is a common Turkish dessert that employs shredded yufka. There are different types of kadayıf: tel (wire) or burma (wring) kadayıf, both of which can be prepared with either walnuts or pistachios.

Although carrying the label "kadayıf", ekmek kadayıfı is totally different from "tel kadayıf". Künefe and ekmek kadayıfı are rich in syrup and butter, and are usually served with kaymak (clotted or scrambled butter). Künefe contains wire kadayıf with a layer of melted cheese in between and it is served hot with pistachios or walnuts.

Katmer is made as a dessert with kaymak (clotted cream), and like many other sweets from Gaziantep and Kilis, is also filled and topped with pistachios.

Among milk-based desserts, the best-known are muhallebi or sütlaç (rice pudding), keşkül, kazandibi (meaning the bottom of "kazan" because of its burnt surface), and tavuk göğsü (a sweet, gelatinous milk pudding dessert similar to kazandibi, to which very thinly peeled chicken breast is added to give a chewy texture). A speciality from the Mediterranean region is haytalı, which consists of pieces of starch pudding and ice cream (or crushed ice) in rose water sweetened with syrup.

Helva (halva): un helvası (flour helva is usually cooked after someone has died), süt helvası (made from raw cow's milk, butter, flour and sugar) irmik helvası (cooked with semolina and pine nuts), hoşmerim (cheese helva), yaz helvası (made from walnut or almond), tahin helvası (crushed sesame seeds; also eaten for breakfast), kos helva, pişmaniye (floss halva).

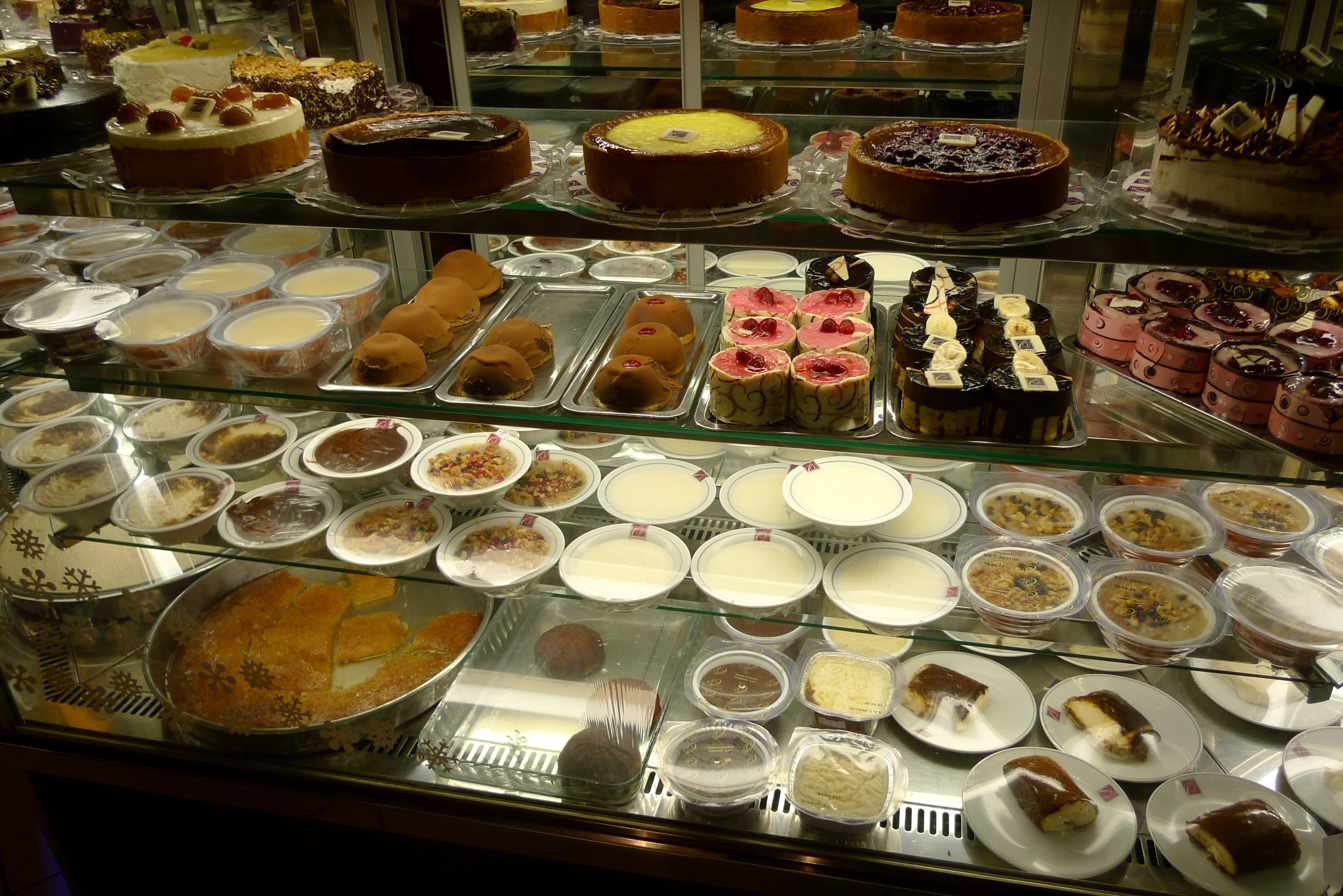
Assortment of Turkish desserts

Other common desserts include revani (with semolina and starch), şekerpare, dilber dudağı, vezir parmağı, hanım göbeği, kemalpaşa, tulumba, zerde, lokma.

Güllaç is a dessert typically served at Ramadan, consisting of very thin, large dough layers put in milk and rose water, served with pomegranate seeds and walnuts. A story is told that in the kitchens of the Palace, those extra-thin dough layers were prepared with "prayers", as it was believed that if one did not pray while opening phyllo dough, it would never be possible to obtain such thin layers.

Aşure can be described as a sweet soup containing boiled beans, wheat and dried fruits. Sometimes cinnamon and rose water is added when being served. According to legend, it was first cooked on Noah's Ark and contained seven different ingredients in one dish. Anatolian peoples continue a tradition of cooking aşure during the month of Muharrem.

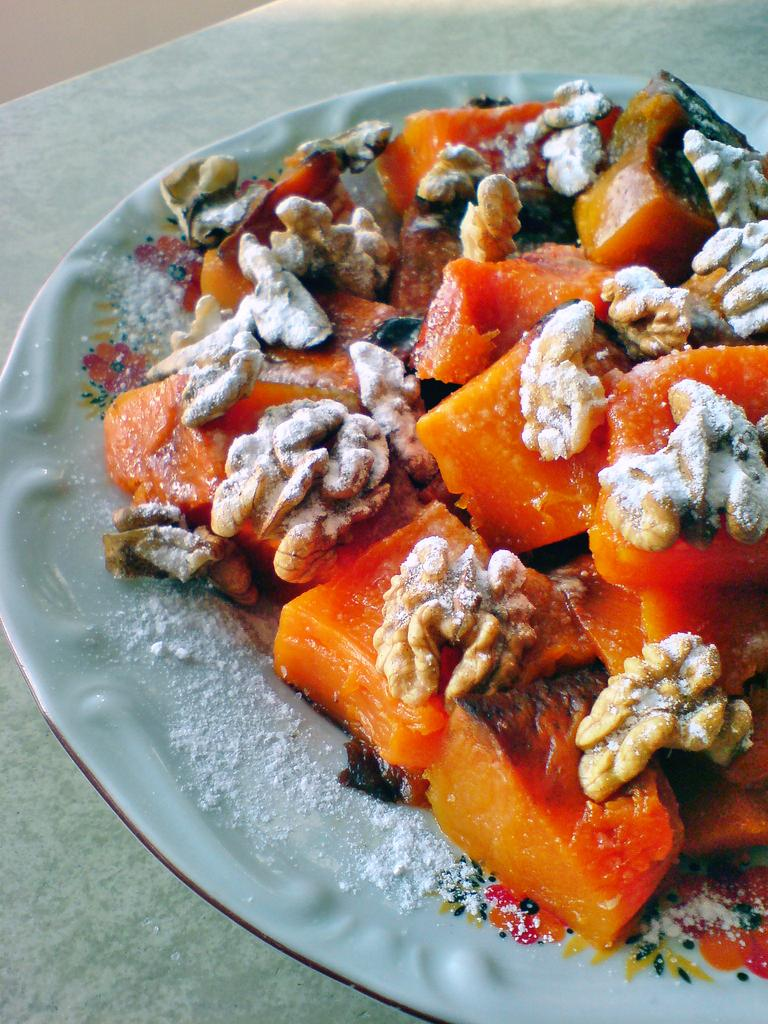
Kabak tatlısı - pumpkin dessert

Some traditional Turkish desserts are fruit-based: ayva tatlısı (quince), incir tatlısı (fig), kabak tatlısı (pumpkin), elma tatlısı (apple) and armut tatlısı (pear). Fruits are cooked in a pot or in an oven with sugar, carnations and cinnamon (without adding water). After being chilled, they are served with walnuts or pistachios and kaymak or tahini.

Homemade cookies/biscuits are commonly called "kurabiye" in Turkish. The most common types are acıbadem kurabiyesi (prepared only with eggs, sugar and almonds), un kurabiyesi (flour kurabiye) and cevizli kurabiye (kurabiye with walnuts). Another dough based dessert is ay çöreği.

Tahin-pekmez is a traditional combination especially in rural areas. Tahin is sesame paste and pekmez is grape syrup. These are sold separately and mixed before consumption.

Lokum (Turkish delight), which was eaten for digestion after meals and called "rahat hulkum" in the Ottoman era, is another well-known sweet (candy) with a range of varieties.

Cezerye, cevizli sucuk (named after its sujuk-like shape, also known as churchkhela in Georgian cuisine, or sharots in Armenian cuisine) and pestil (fruit leather) are among other common sweets.

Marzipan (badem ezmesi) is another common confection in Turkey.

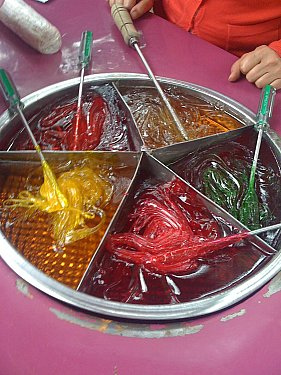
Macun

Another jellylike Turkish sweet is macun. Mesir macunu of Manisa (or İzmir) (which was also called "nevruziye", as this macun was distributed on the first day of spring in the Ottoman Palace) contains 41 different spices. It is still believed that mesir macunu is good for health and has healing effects. As with lokum, nane macunu, prepared with mint, used to be eaten as a digestive after heavy meals. Herbs and flowers having curative effects were grown in the gardens of Topkapı under the control of the chief doctor "hekimbaşı" and pharmacists of the Palace who used those herbs for preparing special types of macun and sherbet.

There are also several types of ice cream based on salep powder or corn starch with rose water, such as dondurma (Turkish gum ice cream), dried fruit ice cream, and ice cream rose petals.

Dried fruit is also eaten with almonds or walnuts as a dessert. Raisins, dried figs and apricots are the most widespread dried fruits.

Kaymak (clotted cream-butter) is often served with desserts to cut through their sweetness.

Turkish tea or Turkish coffee, with or without sugar, is usually served after dinner or, more rarely, together with desserts.

=== Meat dishes ===
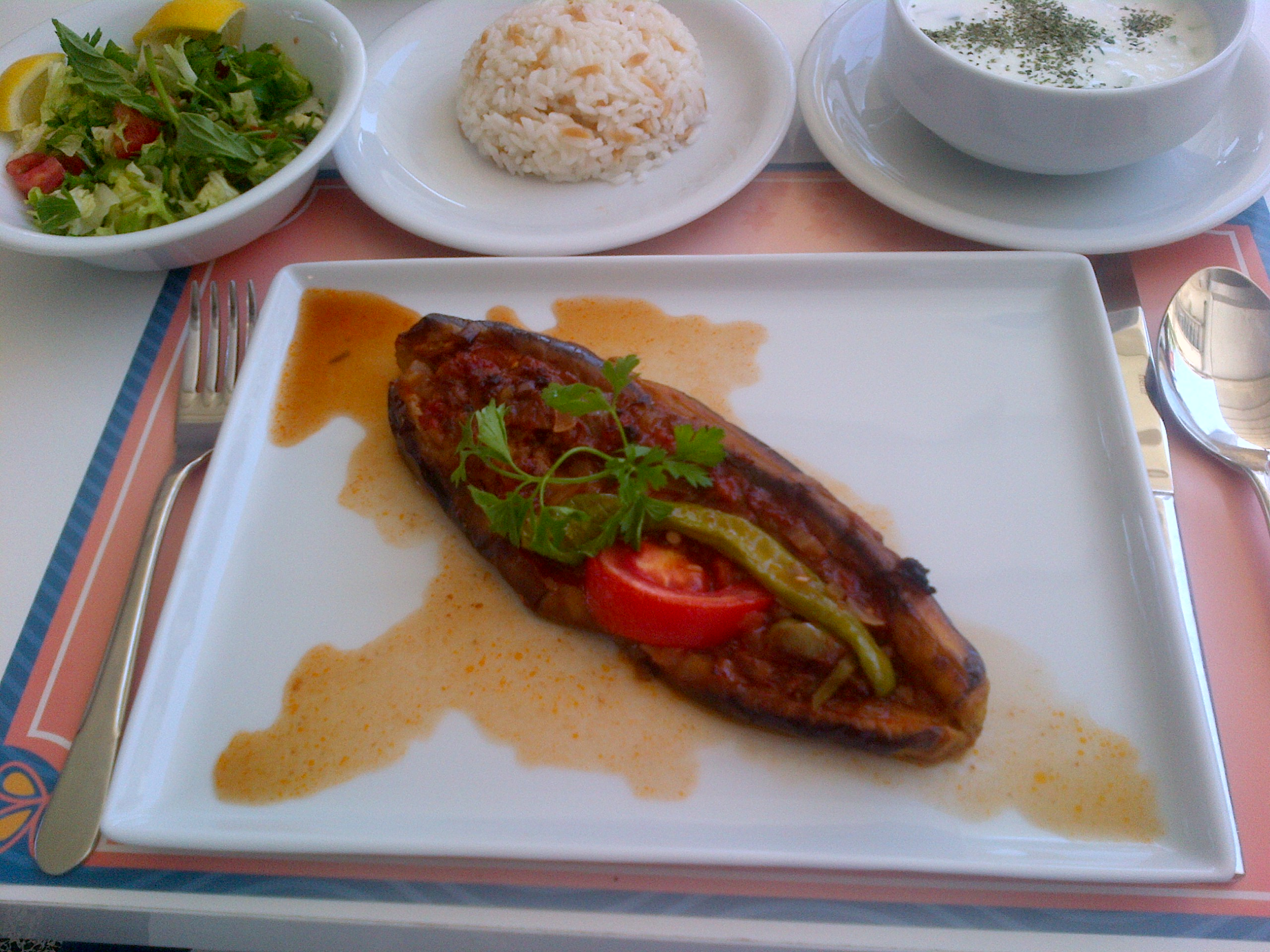
Karnıyarık

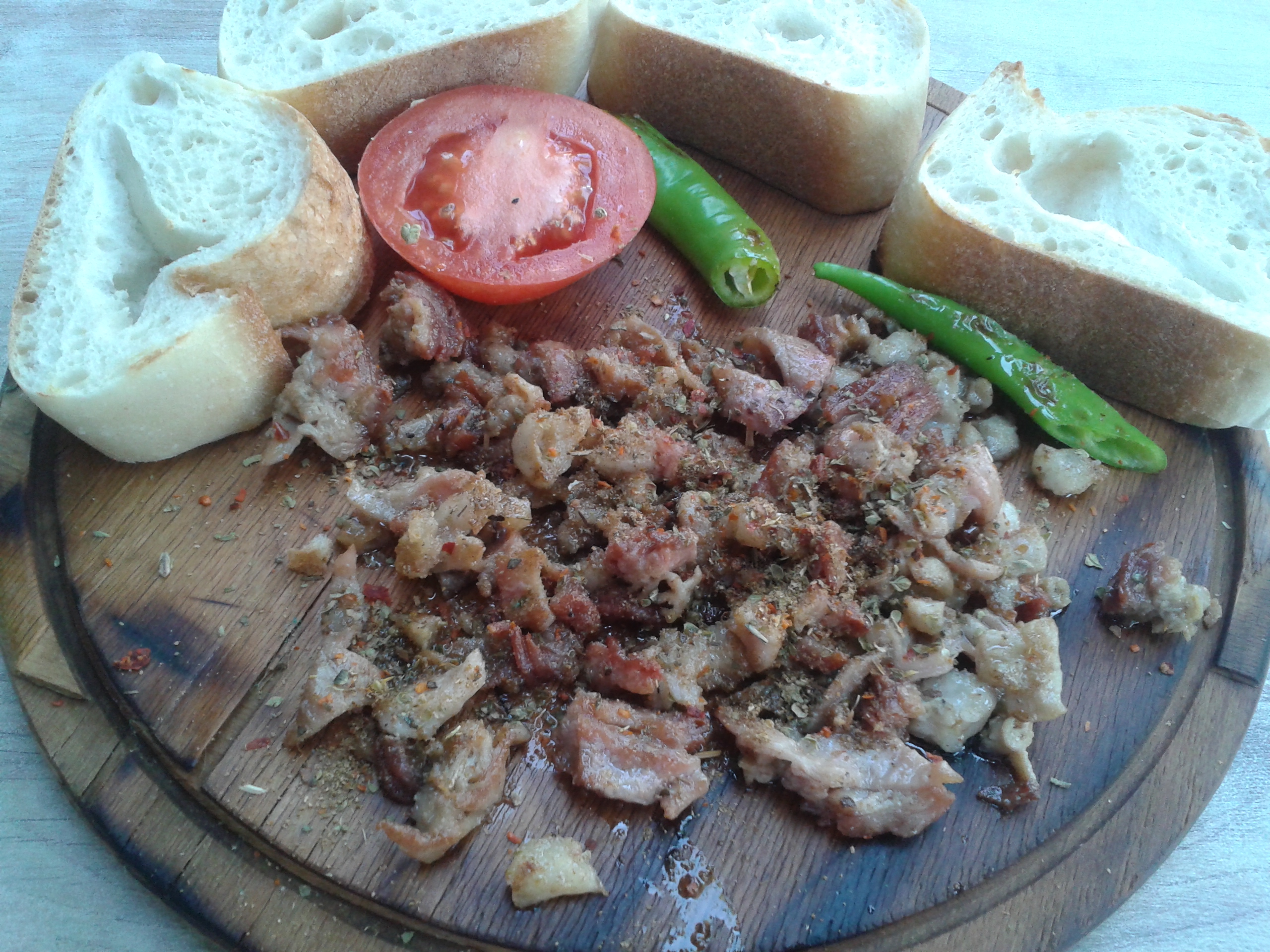
Kokoreç in Ankara

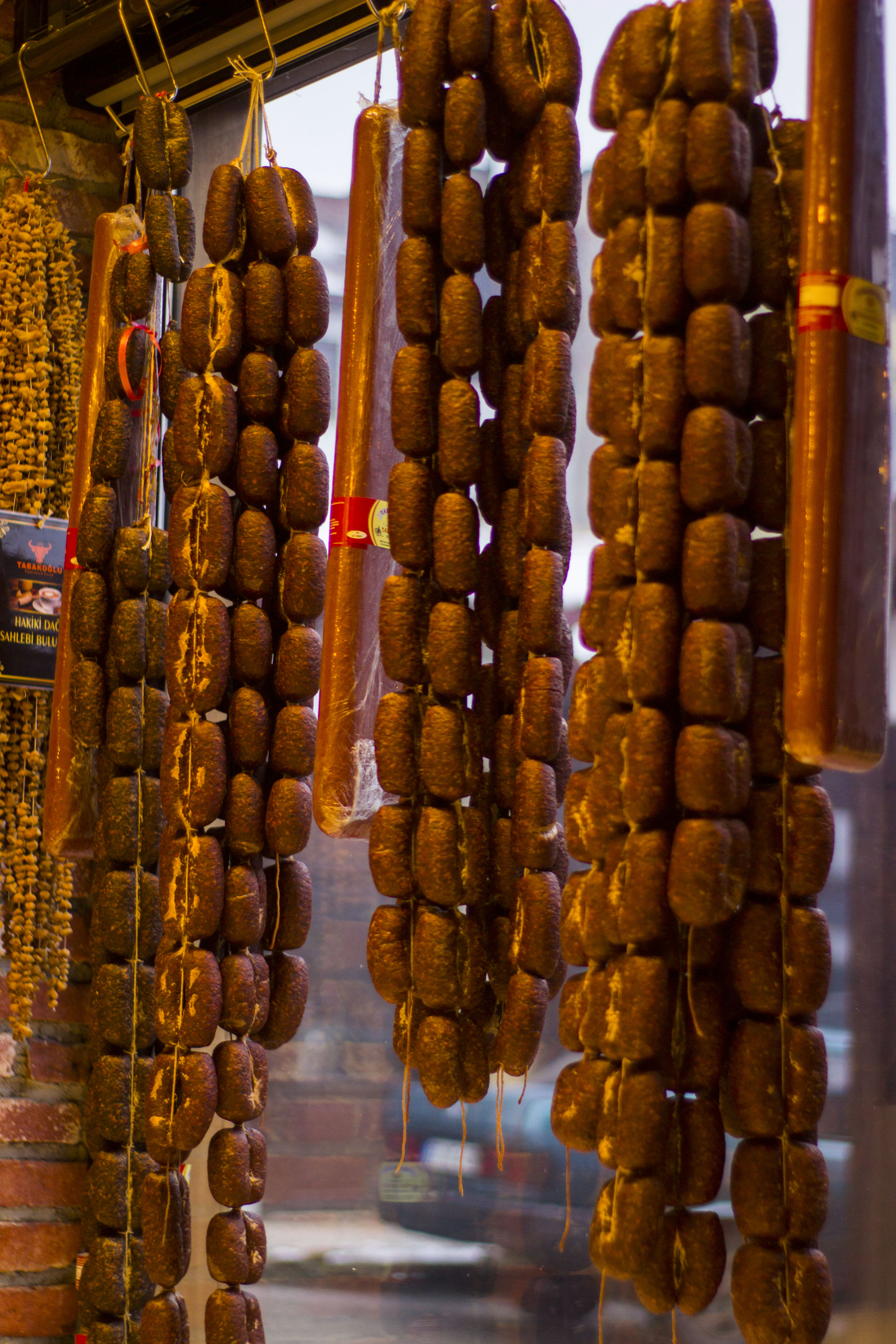
Pastirma and sucuks

- Tantuni – similar to dürüm, meat cut in very small pieces, served in lavash, a specialty from the Mersin province of Turkey.
- Iskilip dolması – caramelized onions, rice and lamb traditionally cooked in a cloth bag in a large copper pot or cauldron, a regional specialty of Çorum
- Kuzu güveç – lamb cooked in earthenware casserole called güveç.
- Pastırmalı kuru fasulye – white kidney bean stew with pastırma.
- Kuzu kapama – spring lamb stewed.
- Haşlama – boiled lamb with vegetables and lemon juice.
- Kavurma – which means frying, roasting or parching in Turkish, is generally used for roasted lamb or a variety of fried meat dishes. Çoban kavurma is a variety of it, prepared with diced lamb with tomatoes, onions, mushrooms, peppers and herbs. Kavurma is one of the favorite dishes of Ramadan.
- Alinazik – home-style Turkish kebab variety with its unique mashed eggplant base as a specialty of the Gaziantep province.
- Hünkârbeğendi – the name means that the sovereign/sultan liked it; the dish consists of a puree of grilled eggplant with kaşar cheese, topped with cubed lamb meat.
- Türlü – a stew of vegetables and meat cooked in güveç-casserole.
- Külbastı
- Ankara tava (pilav with lamb)
- Tandır –Without adding any water, the meat is cooked very slowly with a special technique.
- İncik – lamb shank cooked in the oven.
- Boraniye – broad bean/spinach/squash boraniye, vegetables cooked together with meat, yoğurt and chickpea.
- Karnıyarık (split-belly eggplant) (eggplants) – are cut off and fried. Then they are filled with minced meat, onion, garlic and tomato paste and cooked in the oven.
- Kanat (chicken wings)
- Köfte (meatball) – is another meat dish in Turkey. The word köfte is sometimes preceded by the name of a town, which refers to the technique for cooking it or the ingredients or spices specifically used in that region, for example; İnegöl köftesi, İzmir köfte, Akçaabat köfte, Pideli köfte, Filibe köfte, Tire köfte, Islama köfte, etc. Its main ingredients are minced meat, parsley, bread-egg (not necessarily, usually homemade köfte contains egg yolk and some crumbled bread) and a range of spices: cumin, oregano, mint powder, red or black pepper powder with onion or garlic. Kadınbudu köfte is another traditional speciality; minced meat is mixed with cooked rice and fried. Içli köfte can be described as a shell of "bulgur" filled with onion, minced meat and nuts. Çiğ köfte is a meze from south-eastern Turkey meaning raw meatballs, prepared with bulgur wheat and raw minced meat (like beef or lamb). Today in most Turkish restaurants, the raw meat is usually omitted and instead extra-fine bulgur is used. Terbiyeli sulu köfte is another meatball speciality cooked with flour, tomato paste and water into which lemon and egg sauce is added.
- Sucuk – is a form of raw sausage (usually cooked before eating, made with beef and a range of spices, and garlic) commonly eaten with breakfast. Instead of classical sausages (sosis), sucuk is the most used ingredient for snacks and fast-food-style toasts and sandwiches in Turkey.
- Pastırma – is another well-known beef speciality. Both pastırma and sucuk can be put in kuru fasulye ('dry beans') to enrich the aroma. Both can be served as a meze as well. Sucuk or pastırma with scrambled eggs, served in a small pan called a sahan, is eaten at breakfast in Turkey.
- Kokoreç (the intestines of sheep) – with spices is a traditional low-price fast food in Turkey.
- Liver – is fried in Turkish cuisine. Arnavut ciğeri (meaning "Albanian liver"), served with onion and sumac, is usually eaten as a meze, in combination with other mezes such as fava. Edirne ciğeri is another well-known liver dish from Edirne. Liver is first frozen so that it can be cut into very thin layers. After being cut off, liver layers are fried.
- Kelle (roasted sheep's head)
- Kuzu etli enginar (artichokes with lamb)
- Etli taze fasulye (green beans stew with meat)
- Etli bamya (okra with meat)
- İşkembeli nohut (chickpea with tripe)
- Piliç dolma (stuffed chicken with spice filling)

==== Kebabs ====
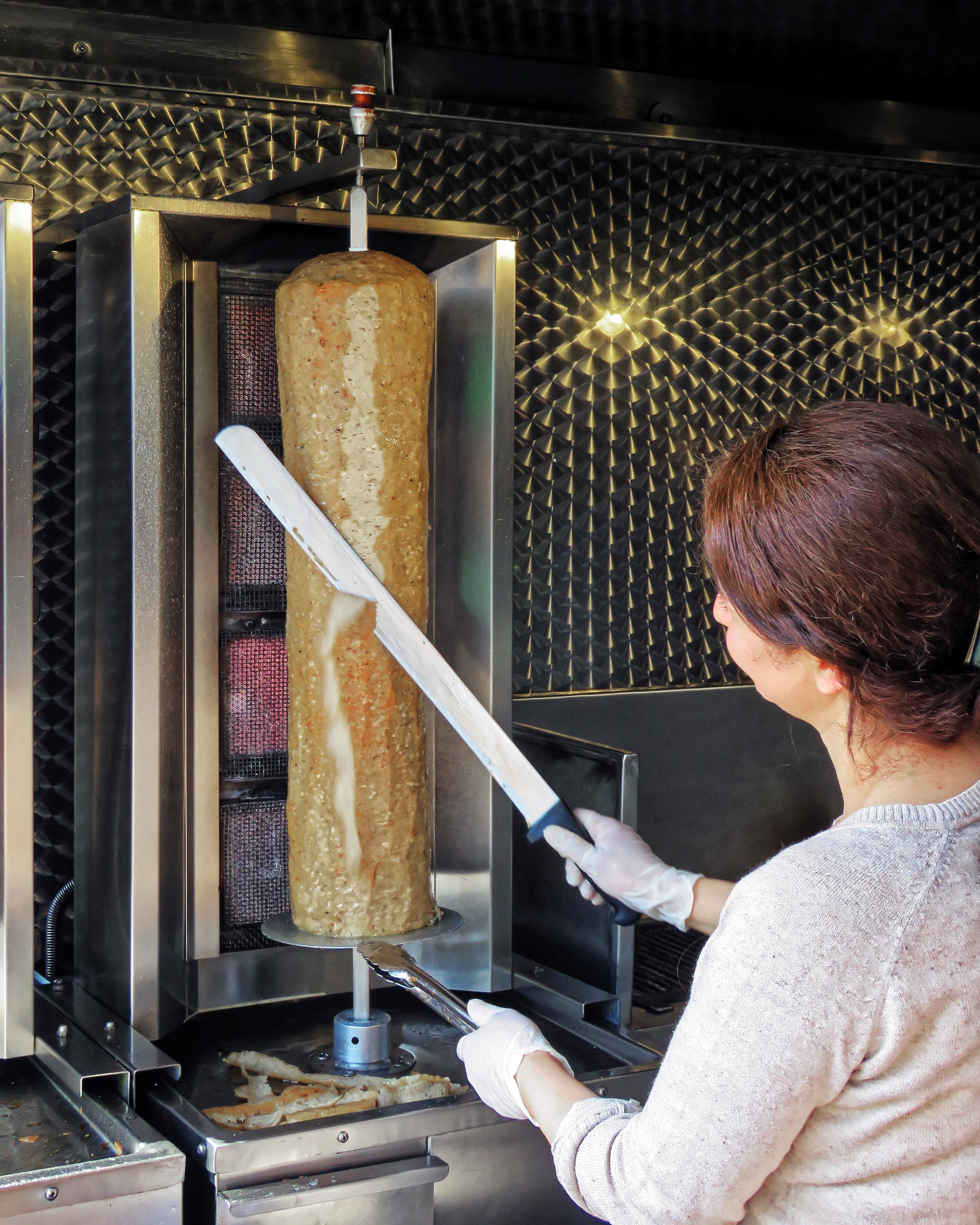
Döner kebap being sliced

Kebab refers to a great variety of meat-based dishes in Turkish cuisine. Kebab in Turkey encompasses not only grilled or skewered meats, but also stews and casseroles.

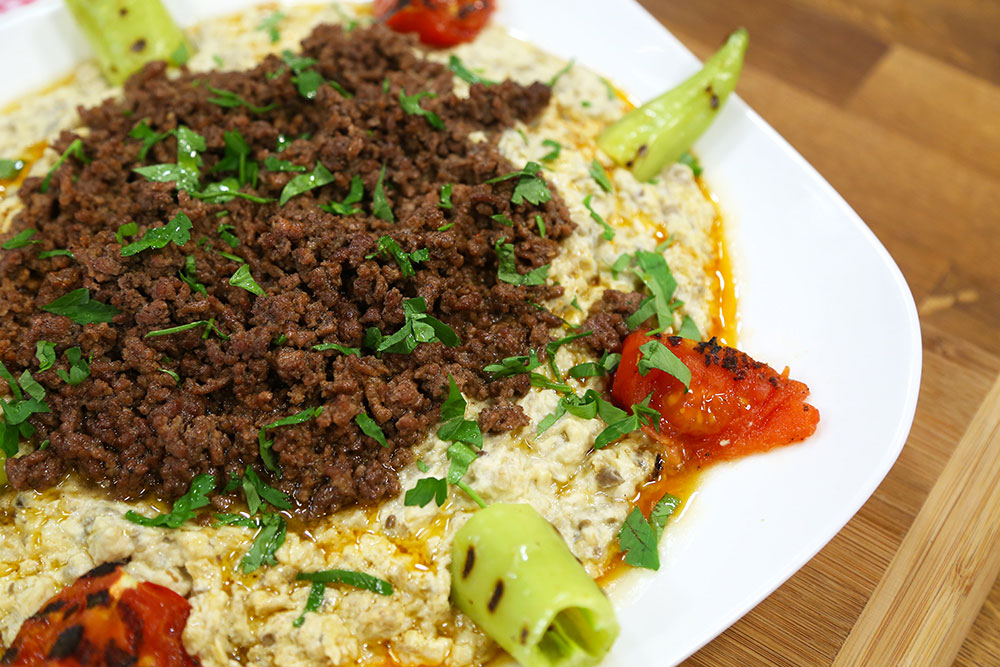
Alinazik kebab over garlic-eggplant puree with vermicelli rice pilaf, grilled tomato and green bell pepper

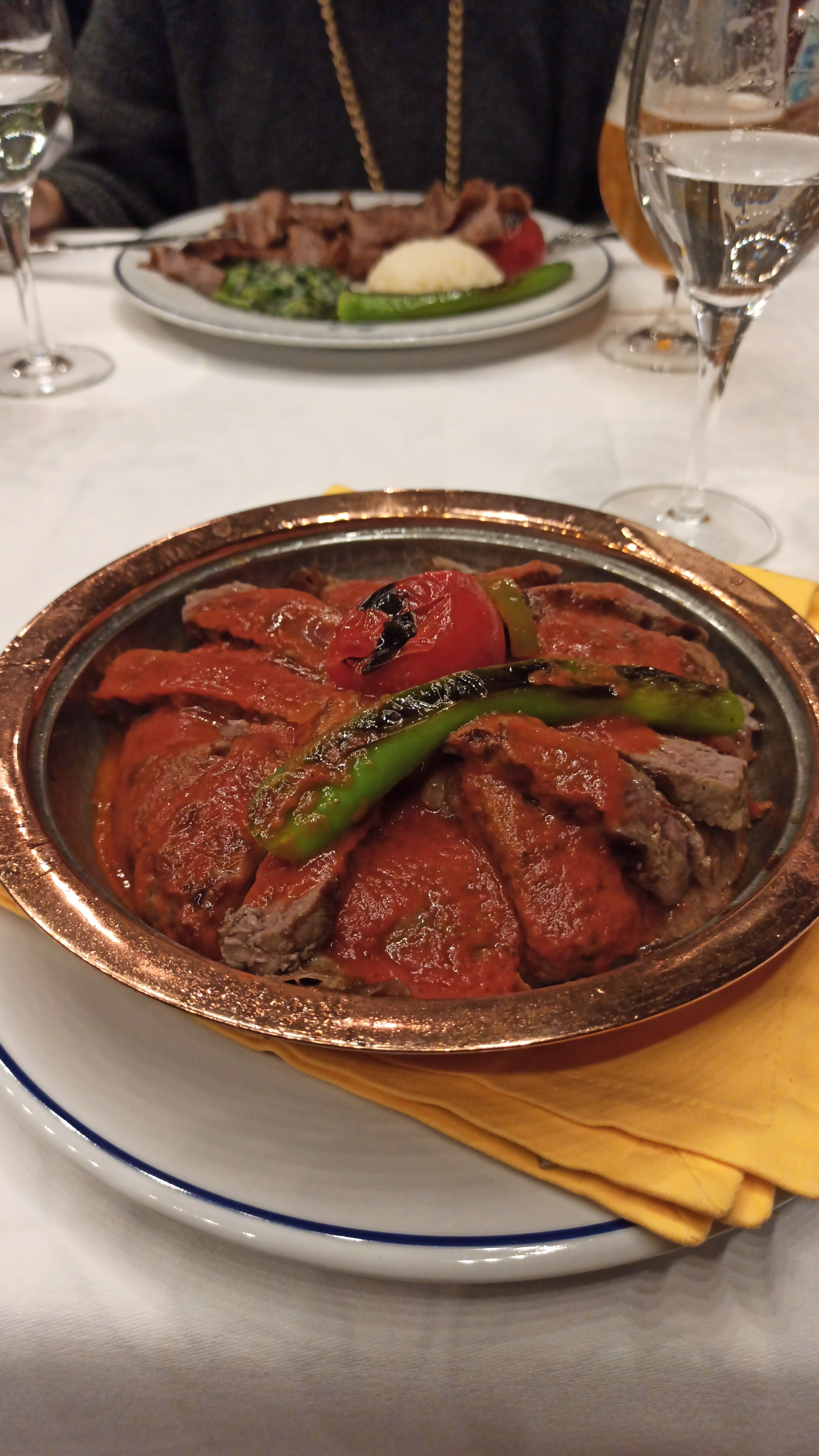
İskender kebap

- Adana kebap or kıyma kebabı – kebab with hand-minced meat mixed with chili on a flat wide metal skewer (shish); associated with Adana region although very common all over Turkey.
- Ali Paşa kebabı, 'Ali Pasha kebab' – cubed lamb with tomato, onion and parsley wrapped in phillo.
- Alinazik kebab – ground meat kebab sautéed in a saucepan, with garlic, yogurt and eggplants added.
- Bahçıvan kebabı, 'gardener's kebab' – boneless lamb shoulder mixed with chopped onions and tomato paste.
- Beyti kebab – ground lamb or beef, seasoned and grilled on a skewer, often served wrapped in lavash and topped with tomato sauce and yogurt, traced back to the famous kebab house Beyti in Istanbul and particularly popular in Turkey's larger cities.
- Bostan kebabı – lamb and aubergine casserole.
- Buğu kebabı, 'steamed kebap' – cooked on low heat until the meat releases its moisture and reabsorbs it.
- Cağ kebab, 'spoke kebab' – cubes of lamb roasted first on a cağ (a horizontal rotating spit) and then on a skewer, a specialty of Erzurum region.
- Ciğer kebabı, 'liver kebab' – usually eaten with sliced onions, salad and bread.
- Ciğerli kağıt kebabı, 'liver paper kebab' – lamb liver kebab mixed with meat and marinated with thyme, parsley and dill.
- Çardak kebabı, 'arbor kebab' – stuffed lamb meat in a crêpe.
- Çökertme kebabı – sirloin veal kebap stuffed with yogurt and potatoes.
- Çömlek kebabı, 'earthenware bowl kebab' – meat and vegetable casserole (called a güveç in Turkish) with eggplant, carrots, shallots, beans, tomatoes and green pepper.
- Çöp şiş, "small skewer kebab" – a speciality of Selçuk and Germencik near Ephesus, pounded boneless meat with tomatoes and garlic marinated with black pepper, thyme and oil on wooden skewers.
- Döner kebab
- Hünkâri kebabı, 'Sultan's kebab' – sliced lamb meat mixed with patlıcan beğendi (aubergine purée), basil, thyme and bay leaf.
- İskender kebap – döner kebab served with yogurt, tomato sauce and butter, originated in Bursa. The kebab was invented by İskender Efendi in 1867. He was inspired by cağ kebab and turned it from horizontal to vertical.
- İslim kebabı, 'steamed kebab' – another version of the aubergine kebab without its skin, marinated in sunflower oil.
- Kağıt kebabı – lamb cooked in a paper wrapping.
- Kuyu kebabı, 'pit kebab' – prepared from goat, it is a specialty of Aydın region, similar to tandır kebabı.
- Kuzu incik kebabı, 'lamb shank kebab' – lamb shanks mixed with peeled eggplants and chopped tomatoes, cream, salt and pepper.
- Kuzu şiş – shish prepared with marinated milk-fed lamb meat.
- Köfte kebap or shish köfte – minced lamb meatballs with herbs, often including parsley and mint, on a stick, grilled.
- Manisa kebabı – this Manisa region version of the kebab is smaller and flat shish meat on sliced pide bread, flavored with butter, and stuffed with tomato, garlic and green pepper.
- Orman kebabı, 'forest kebab' – lamb meat on the bone and cut in large pieces mixed with carrots, potatoes and peas.
- Patates kebabı, 'potato kebab' – beef or chicken mixed with potatoes, onions, tomato sauce and bay leaves.
- Patlıcan kebabı, 'aubergine kebab' – special kebap meat marinated in spices and served with eggplant (aubergine), hot pide bread and a yogurt sauce.
- Ramazan kebabı, 'Ramadan kebab' – meat mixed with yogurt, tomato and garlic stuffed with fresh mint or garnish on pide bread.
- Shish kebab – prepared with fish, lamb or chicken meat on thin metal or reed rods, grilled.
- Şiş tavuk or tavuk şiş – yogurt-marinated chicken grilled on a stick.
- Sivas kebabı – associated with the Sivas region, similar to Tokat kebab but especially lamb ribs are preferred and it also differs from Tokat kebabı on the point that there are no potatoes inside.
- Susuz kebap, 'waterless kebab' – cooked after draining excess fluid from the meat rubbed with salt and cinnamon in saucepan.
- Talaş kebabı, 'sawdust kebab' – diced lamb, mixed with grated onions, brown meat mixed with flour dough.
- Tandır kebabı, 'tandoor kebab' – lamb pieces (sometimes a whole lamb) baked in an oven called a tandır, which requires a special way of cooking for hours. Served with bread and raw onions.
- Tas kebabı, 'bowl kebab' – stewed kebab in a bowl, beginning with the cooking of the vegetables in butter employing a method called yaga vurmak ('butter infusion'), before the meat itself is cooked in the same grease.
- Testi kebabı, 'earthenware-jug kebab' – ingredients are similar to çömlek kebabı, prepared in a testi instead of a güveç, generally found in Central Anatolia and the Mid-Western Black Sea region.
- Tokat kebabı – associated with the Tokat region, it is made with veal marinated in olive oil, aubergine, tomatoes, potatoes, onion, garlic and special pita bread.
- Urfa kebabı – is similar to Adana kebabı, but less spicy.

==== Fish ====
Turkey is surrounded by seas that contain a large variety of fish. Fish are grilled, fried or cooked slowly by the buğulama (poaching) method. Buğulama is fish with lemon and parsley, covered while cooking so that it will be cooked with steam. The term pilâki is also used for fish cooked with various vegetables, including onion in the oven. In the Black Sea region, fish are usually fried with thick corn flour. Fish are also eaten cold; as smoked (isleme) or dried (çiroz), canned, salted or pickled (lâkerda). Fish is also cooked in salt or in dough in Turkey. Pazıda levrek is a seafood speciality which consists of sea bass cooked in chard leaves. In fish restaurants, it is possible to find other fish varieties like balık dolma (stuffed fish), balık iskender (inspired by İskender kebap), fishballs or fish en papillote. Fish soup prepared with vegetables, onion and flour is common in coastal towns and cities. In Istanbul's Eminönü and other coastal districts, grilled fish served in bread with tomatoes, herbs and onion is a popular fast food. In the inner parts of Turkey, trout alabalık is common as it is the main type of freshwater fish. Popular seafood mezes at coastlines include stuffed mussels, fried mussel and fried kalamar (squid) with tarator sauce.

Popular sea fish in Turkey include:

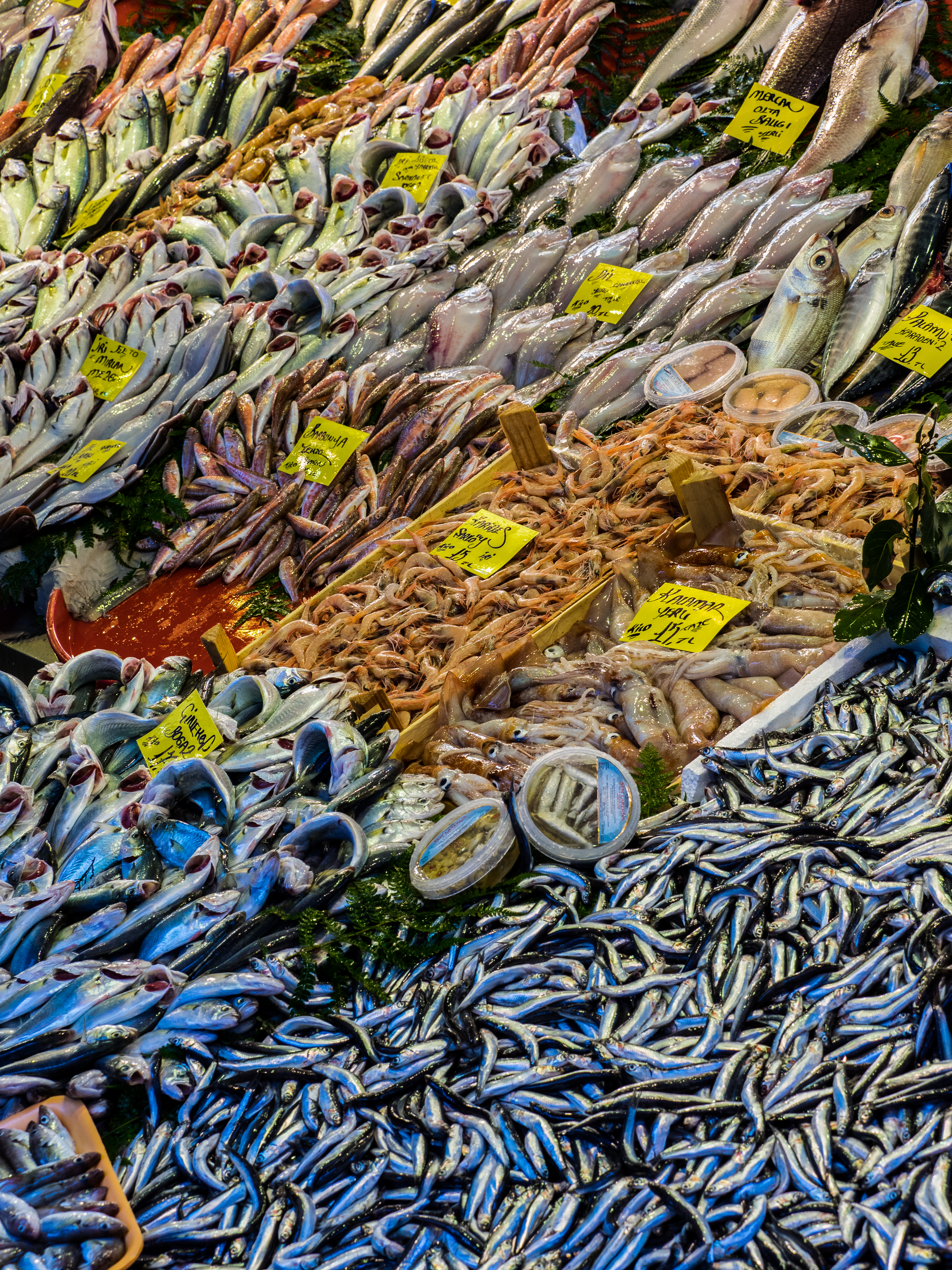
Selection of fish and seafood on display at a fish market

- anchovy hamsi
- sardine sardalya
- bonito palamut
- gilt-head bream çupra or çipura
- red mullet barbun(ya)
- sea bass levrek
- whiting or bakalyaro
- haddock mezgit
- swordfish kılıç balığı
- Black Sea turbot kalkan
- red pandora mercan
- jack mackerel istavrit
- white grouper lagos
- bluefish lüfer

=== Meze ===
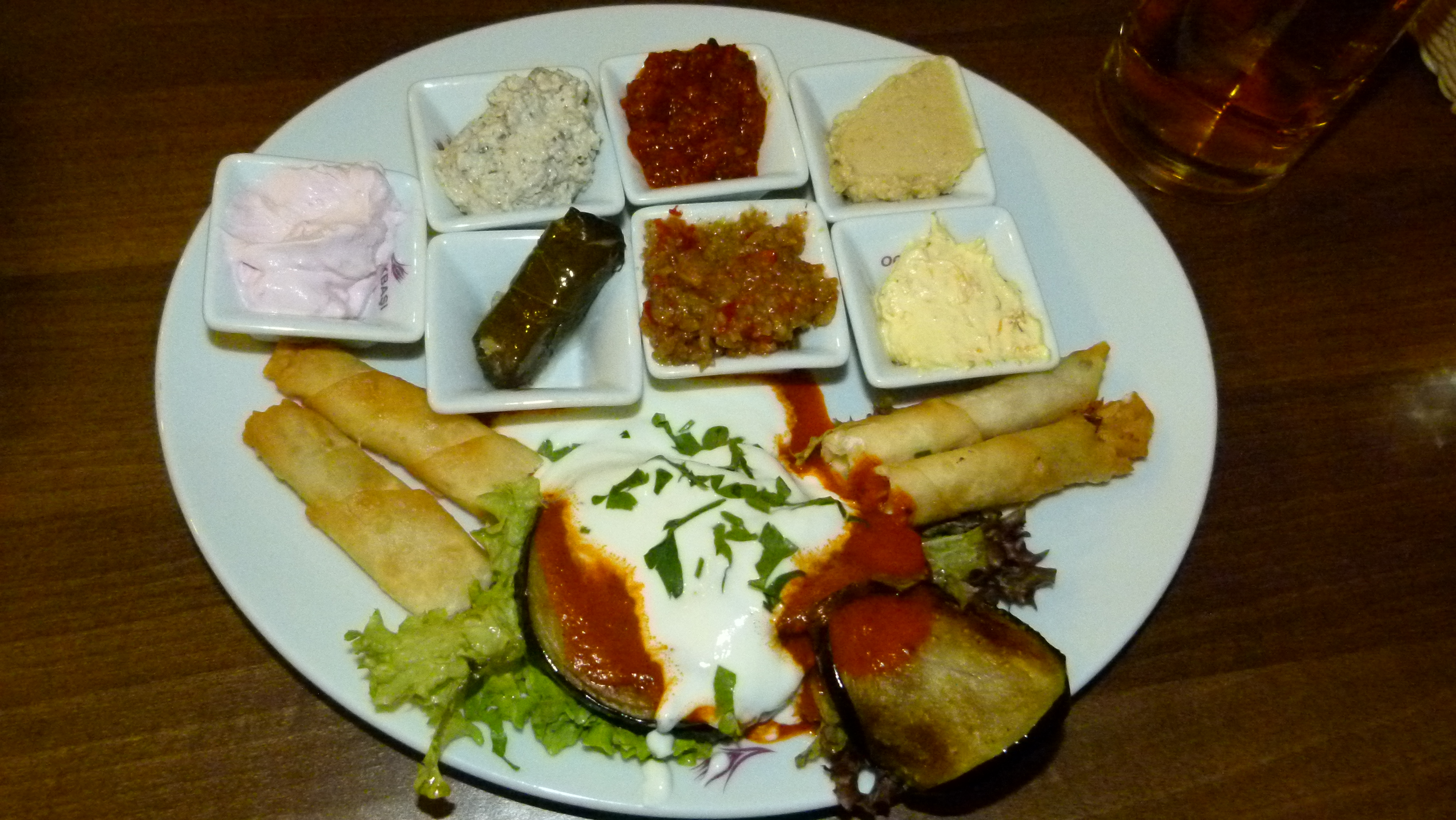
A plate of Turkish meze

Meze is a selection of food served as the appetizer course with or without drinks. Some of them can be served as a main course as well.

Aside from olive, mature kaşar kashar cheese, white cheese, various mixed pickles turşu, frequently eaten Turkish mezes include:

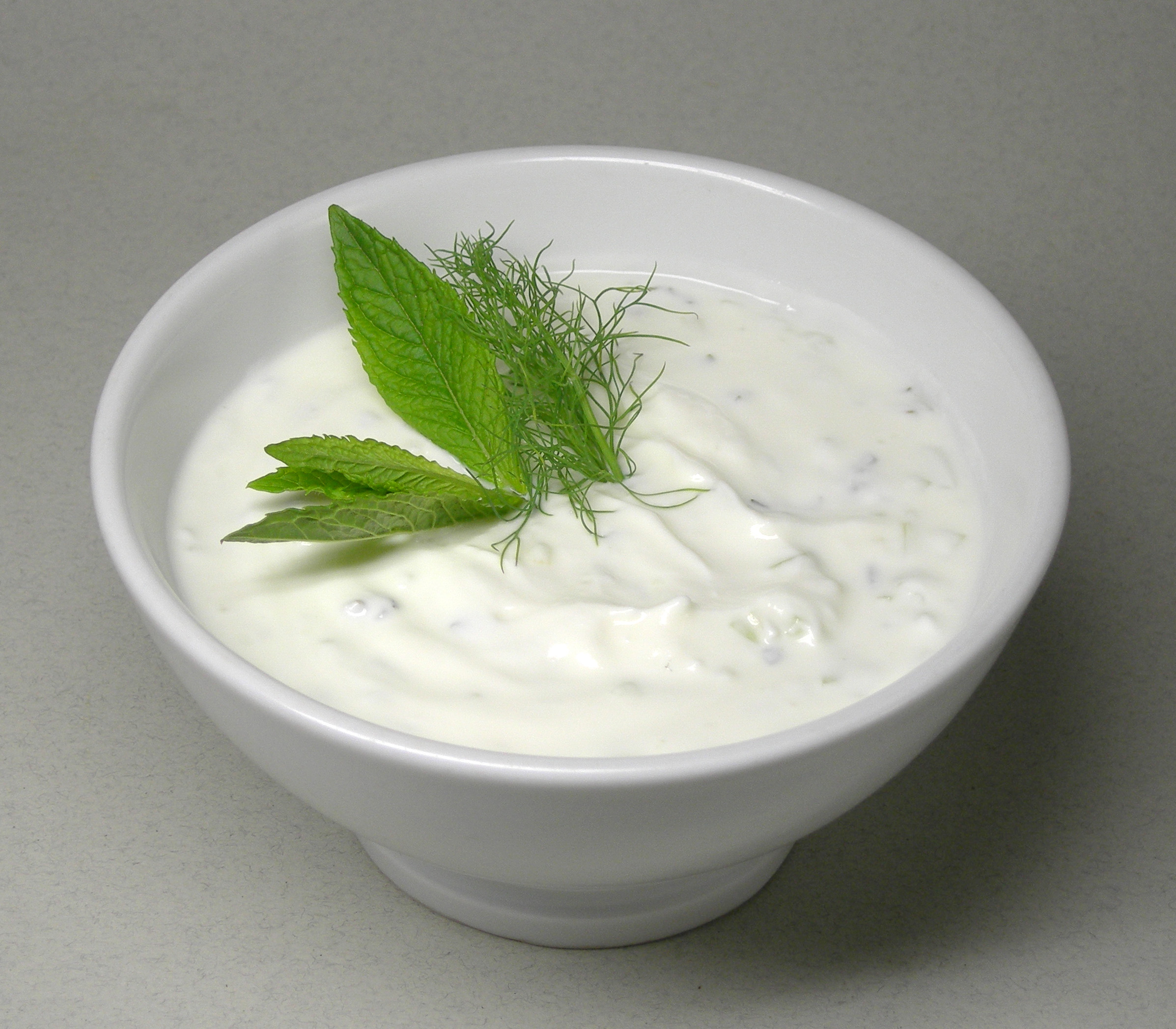
A bowl of cacık, the original form of seasoned, diluted yoğurt with chopped cucumber, eaten throughout the former Ottoman world, under different names, like the tarator and tzatziki of the Balkans

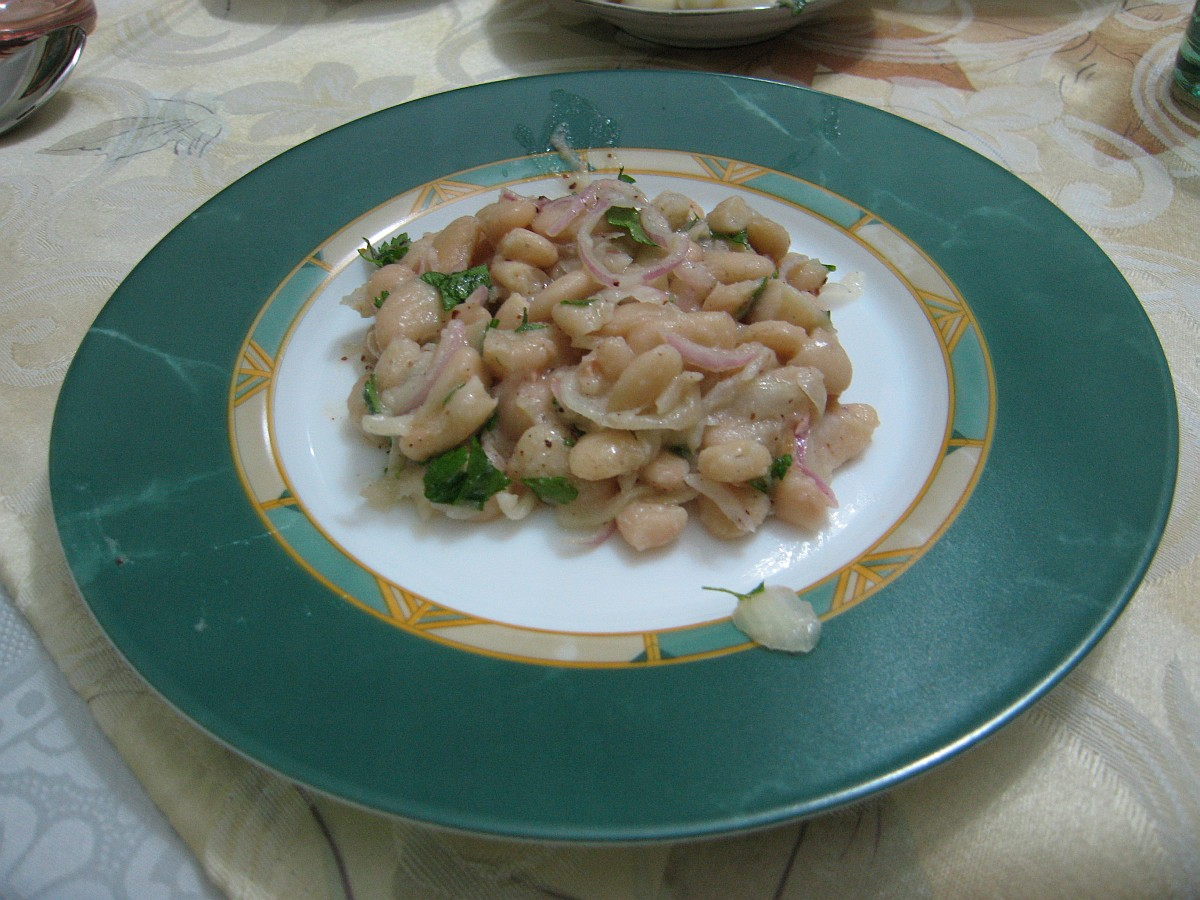
A plate of piyaz

- Arnavut ciğeri (literally "Albanian liver") – fried liver cubes served with onion, parsley and hot pepper.
- Roka (arugula) salatası
- Patlıcan salatası – eggplant salad.
- Piyaz – white bean salad with onion and vinegar.
- Şakşuka or in another version köpoğlu – fried and chopped eggplants and peppers served with garlic yogurt or tomato sauce.
- Bakla ezmesi – hummus prepared from broad bean.
- Barbunya pilaki – borlotti beans cooked with garlic, tomato paste, carrot and olive oil.
- Borani
- Börek – very thin dough layers stuffed with cheese, meat or vegetables.
- Cacık – cucumber with yogurt, dried mint and olive oil.
- Cevizli biber – a meze prepared with walnut, red pepper, pepper paste, onion and cumin.
- Çerkez tavuğu (literally 'Circassian chicken')
- Ahtapot (octopus) – served as a salad or grilled in sea towns.
- Çiğ köfte – raw meat patties, similar to steak tartare, prepared with ground beef (sometimes lamb) and fine-ground bulgur; a vegetarian version using tomato paste is known as etsiz çiğ köfte (literally "meatless raw meatballs").
- Fasulye pilaki – white beans cooked with garlic, tomato paste, carrot and olive oil.
- İçli köfte (also known as 'oruk') – served either as a meze or a main dish; especially in the east of Turkey, when it is cooked through boiling in a pot, içli köfte is served as a main dish.
- Kabak çiçeği dolması – stuffed zucchini blossoms, a kind of dolma.
- Kalamar (calamari) – fried or grilled, served with tarator sauce.
- Kızartma – various fried vegetables (eggplants, peppers, courgettes) served with yogurt or tomato-and-garlic sauce.
- Lakerda – pickled bonito traditionally served with raki at taverns.
- Muhammara: see Acuka
- Oruk: see İçli köfte
- Sigara böreği – feta or hot dogs wrapped in phyllo dough and fried.

=== Pastries ===
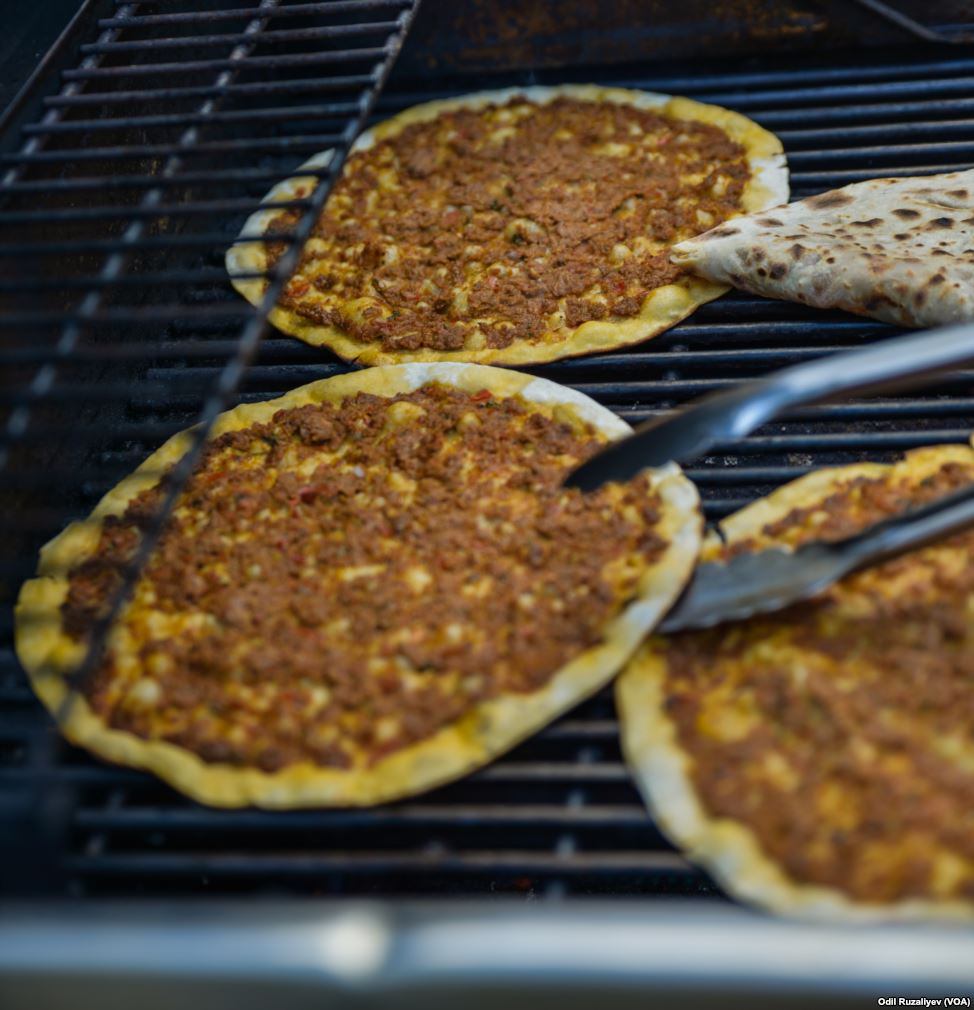
Lahmacun ready to be served

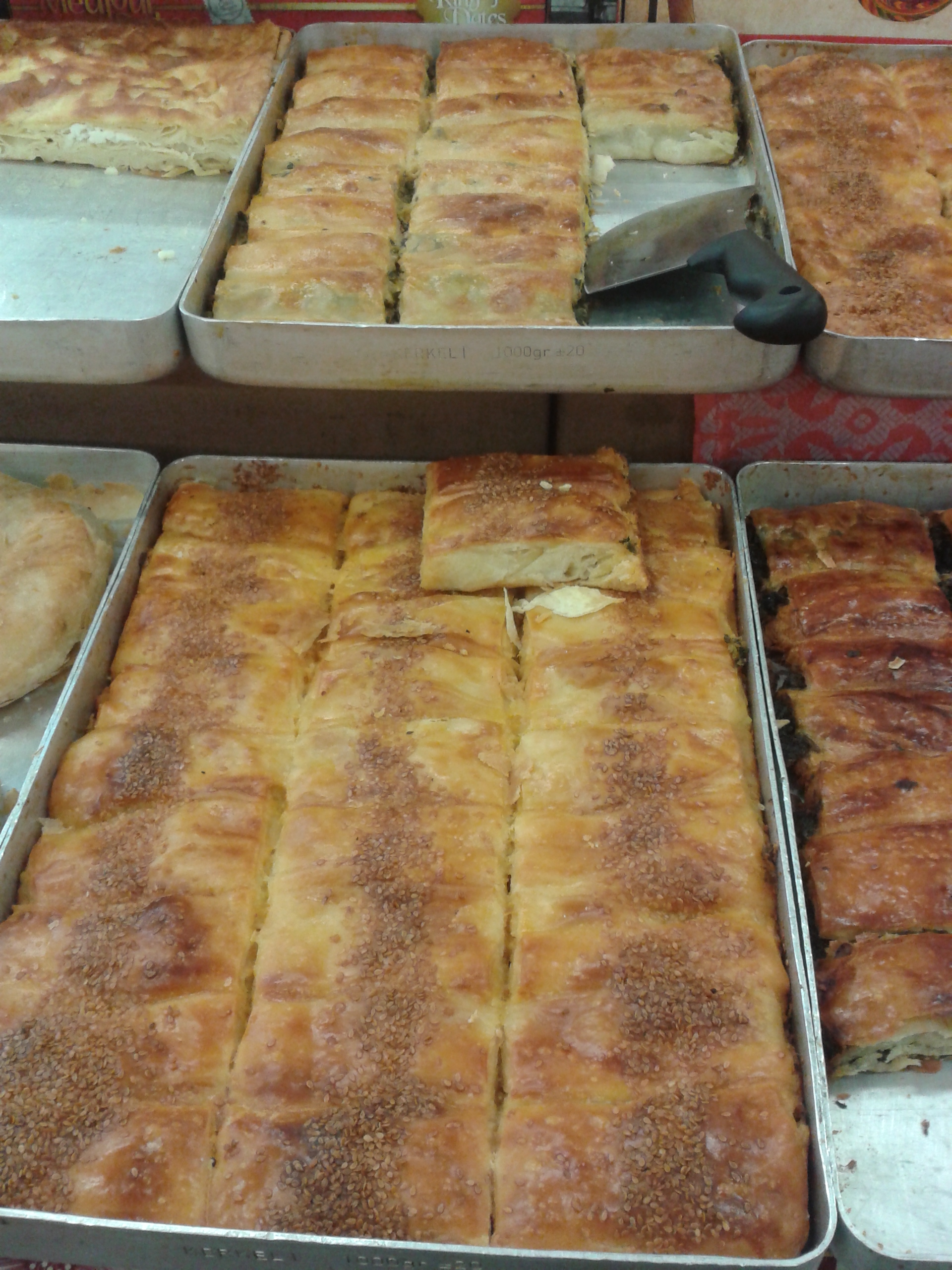
Variety of börek with cheese, potato, spinach and many other fillings

Turkish cuisine has a range of savoury and sweet pastries. Dough-based specialties form an integral part of traditional Turkish cuisine.

The use of layered dough is rooted in the nomadic character of early Central Asian Turks. The combination of domed metal sač and oklava (the Turkish rod-style rolling pin) enabled the invention of the layered dough style used in börek (especially in su böreği, or 'water pastry', a salty baklava-like pastry with cheese filling), güllaç and baklava.

Börek is the general name for salty pastries made with yufka (a thick phyllo dough), which consists of thin layers of dough. Su böreği, made with boiled yufka layers, cheese and parsley, is the most frequently eaten. Çiğ börek (also known as Tatar böreği) is fried and stuffed with minced meat. Kol böreği is another well-known type of börek that takes its name from its shape, as do fincan (coffee cup), muska (talisman), gül böreği (rose) or sigara böreği (cigarette). Other traditional Turkish böreks include talaş böreği (phyllo dough filled with vegetables and diced meat) and puf böreği. Laz böreği is a sweet type of börek, widespread in the Black Sea Region.

Pogača is the label name for dough based salty pastries. Likewise, çörek is another label name used for both sweet and salty pastries.

Gözleme is a food typical in rural areas, made of lavash bread or phyllo dough folded around a variety of fillings such as spinach, cheese and parsley, minced meat or potatoes and cooked on a large griddle (traditionally sač).

Katmer is another traditional rolled-out dough. It can be salty or sweet according to the filling. Katmer with pistachio and kaymak is a sweet food and one of the most common breakfast items in Gaziantep.

Lahmacun (meaning 'dough with meat' in Arabic) is a thin flatbread covered with a layer of spiced minced meat, tomato, pepper, onion or garlic. Lahmacun is typically eaten with red onions, parsley, and lemon juice sprinkled on it after cooking.

Pide, which can be made with minced meat (together with onion, chopped tomatoes, parsley and spices), kashar cheese, spinach, white cheese, pieces of meat, braised meat (kavurma), sucuk, pastirma or/and eggs put on rolled-out dough, is one of the most common traditional stone-baked Turkish specialities.

Açma is a soft bagel found in most parts of Turkey. It is similar to simit in shape, is covered in a glaze, and is usually eaten as a part of breakfast or as a snack.

==== Bread ====
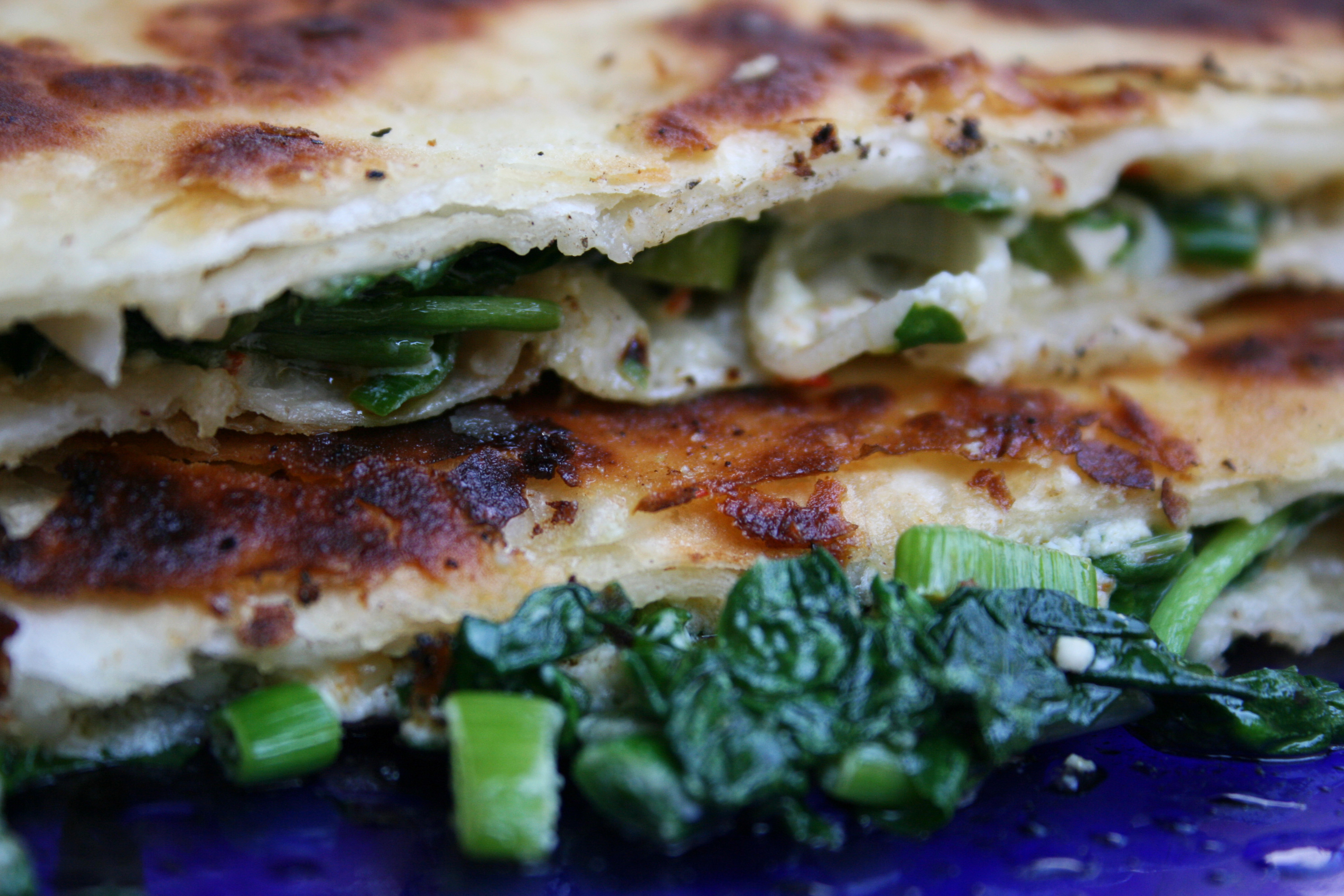
Gözleme

- Bazlama
- Gözleme
- Mısır ekmeği (corn bread)
- Lavaş
- Poğaça
- Pide – a broad, round and flat bread made of wheat flour.
- Simit – known as gevrek in İzmir, another type of ring-shaped bread covered with sesame seeds. Simit is commonly eaten in Turkey, plain or with cheese, butter or marmalade.
- Açma
- Yufka – also known as sac ekmeği, a round and flat bread, made of wheat flour, thinner than pide.
- Pişi

=== Pilav and pasta ===
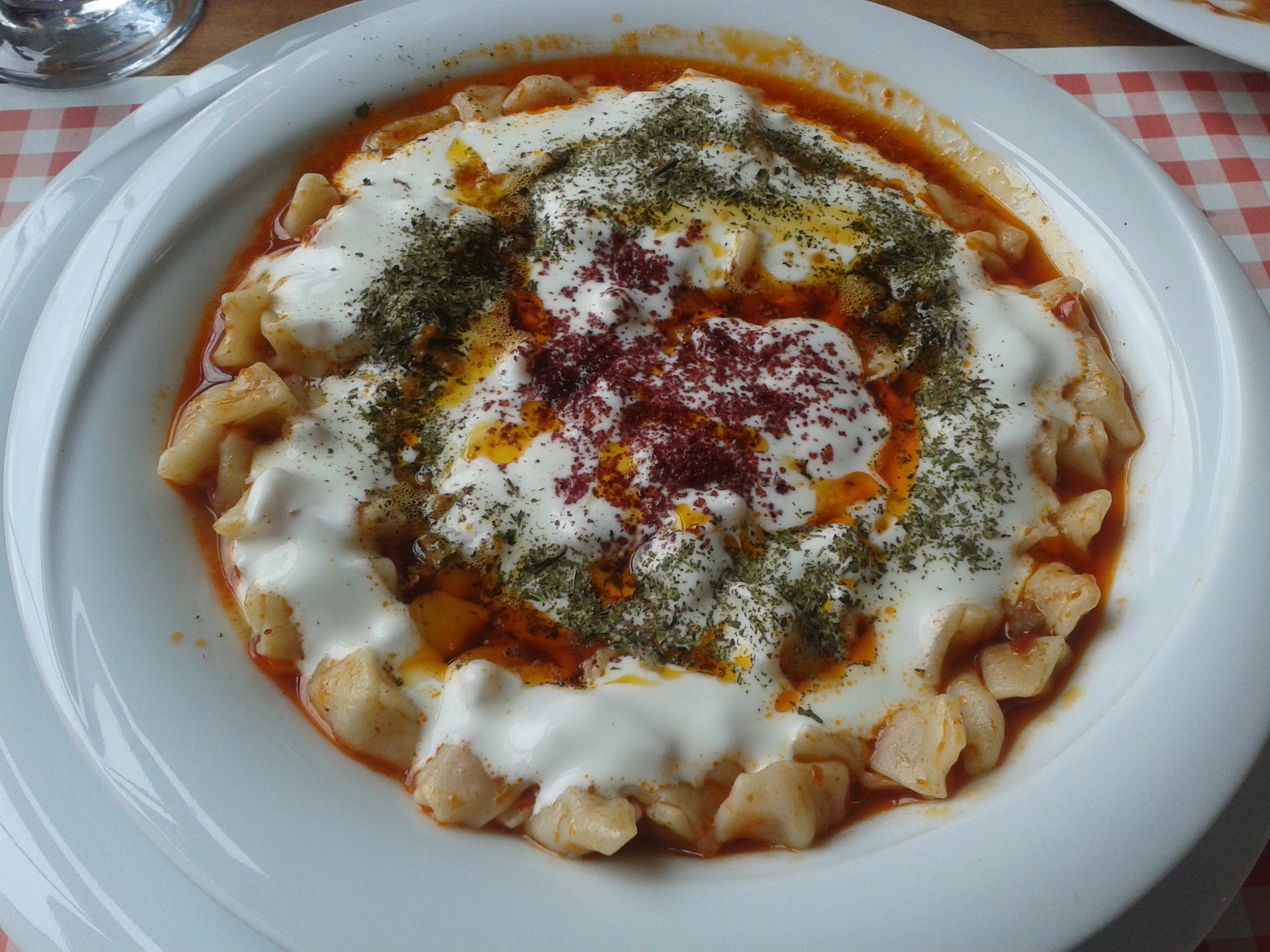
Manti with yogurt and garlic, spiced with red pepper powder and melted butter.

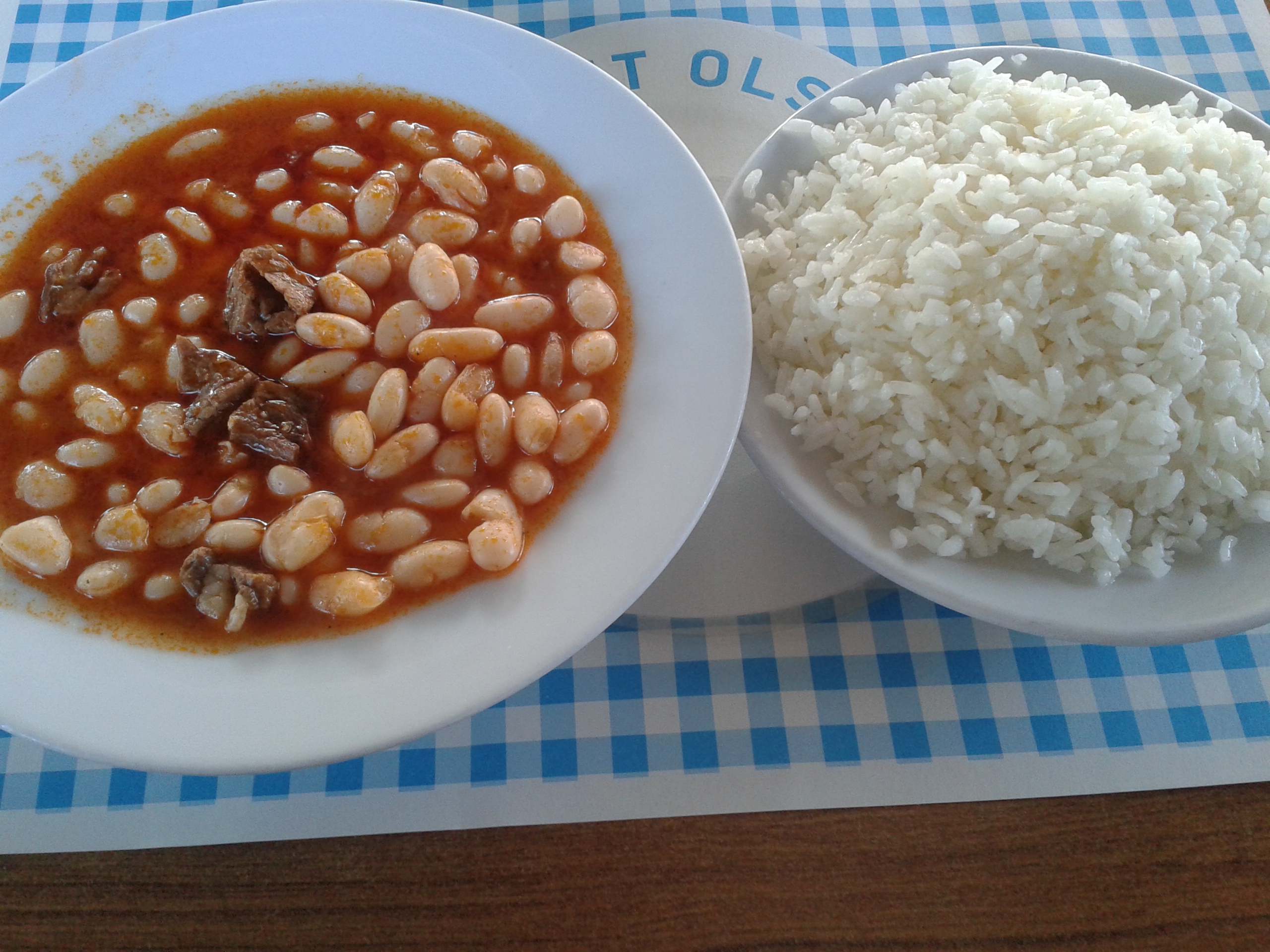
Typical duo: kuru fasulye (beans in tomato paste with meat) and pilav (rice).

Turkish	English	Definition
Sade pilav		Plain rice pilav is often the primary side dish to any meal. It is made by sauteing rice with butter until lightly toasted and simmering with water or stock.
Pilav		Plain rice pilav is often the primary side dish to any meal. It is made by sauteing rice with butter until lightly toasted and simmering with water or stock.
Domatesli pilav		Tomato pilaf
Etli pilav		Rice containing meat pieces
Nohutlu pilav		Rice cooked with chickpeas
İç pilav		Rice with liver slices, currants, peanuts, chestnut, cinnamon and a variety of herbs
Patlıcanlı pilav		Rice with eggplant
Özbek pilavı	Uzbek pilaf	Rice with lamb, onion, carrot
Acem pilavı	Persian pilaf	Rice with lamb, cooked in meat broth with pistachios, cinnamon, etc.
Bulgur pilavı		A cereal food generally made of durum wheat. Most of the time, tomato, green pepper and minced meat are mixed with bulgur. The Turkish name (bulgur pilavı) indicates that this is a kind of rice but it is, in fact, wheat.
Perde pilavı		Rice with chicken, onion and peanuts enveloped in a thin layer of dough, topped with almonds
Hamsili pilav		Spiced rice covered with anchovies, cooked in an oven. A speciality from the Black Sea Region.
Frik pilavı		Rice made of burnt wheat. A speciality from Antioch/Antakya.
Manti		Turkish pasta that consists of folded triangles of dough filled with minced meat, often with minced onions and parsley. It is typically served hot topped with garlic yogurt and melted butter or warmed olive oil, and a range of spices such as oregano, dried mint, ground sumac, and red pepper powder. The combination of meat-filled dough with yogurt differentiates it from other dumplings such as tortellini, ravioli, and Chinese wonton. Manti is usually eaten as a main dish. Minced chicken and quail meats are also used to prepare mantı in some regions of Turkey.
Erişte		Homemade pasta is called "erişte" in Turkey. It can be combined with vegetables but it can also be used in soups and rice.
Keşkek		A meat and wheat (or barley) stew
Kuskus		The Turkish version of couscous, which can be served with any meat dish or stew

=== Salads ===
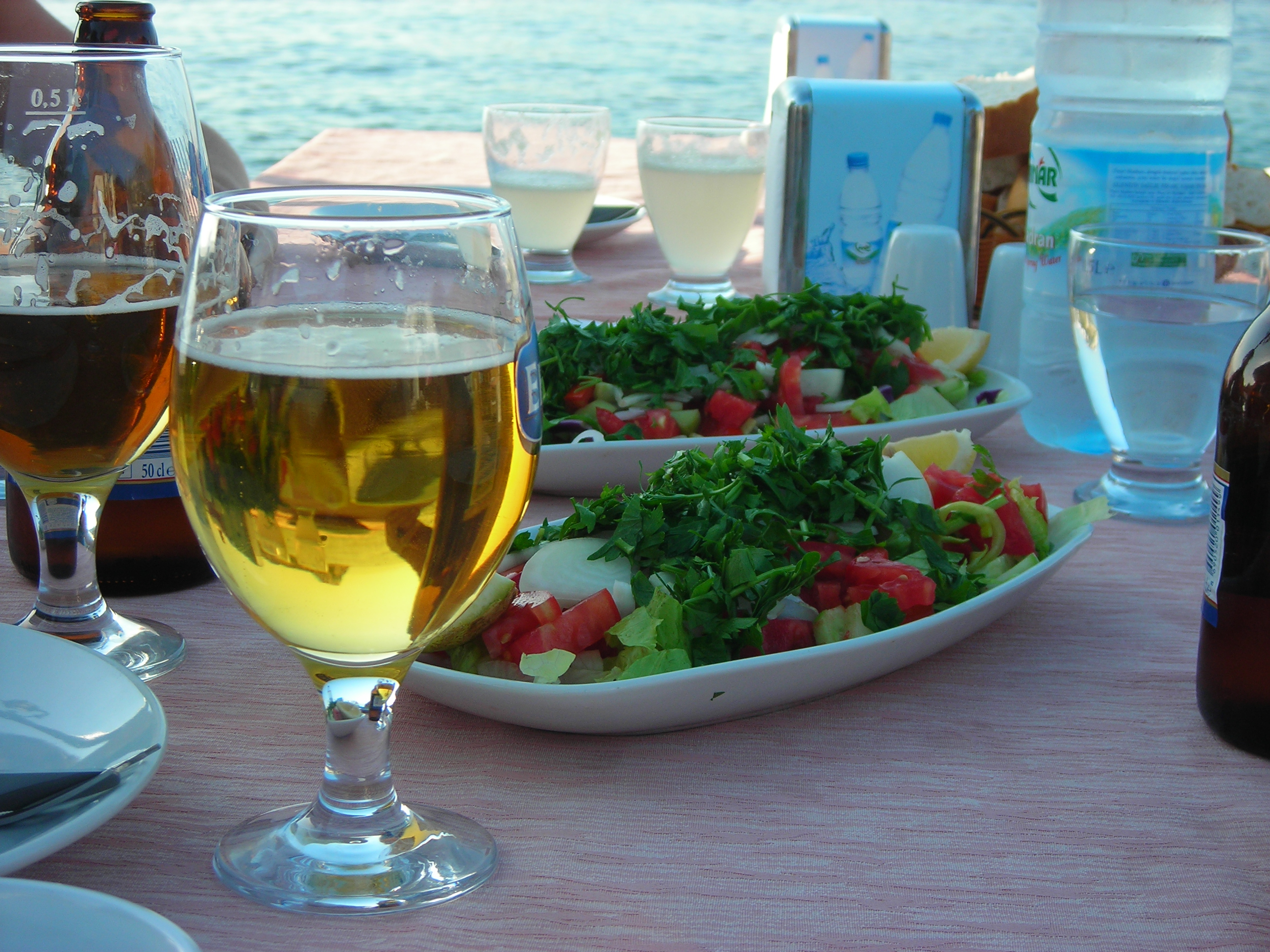
Çoban salatası

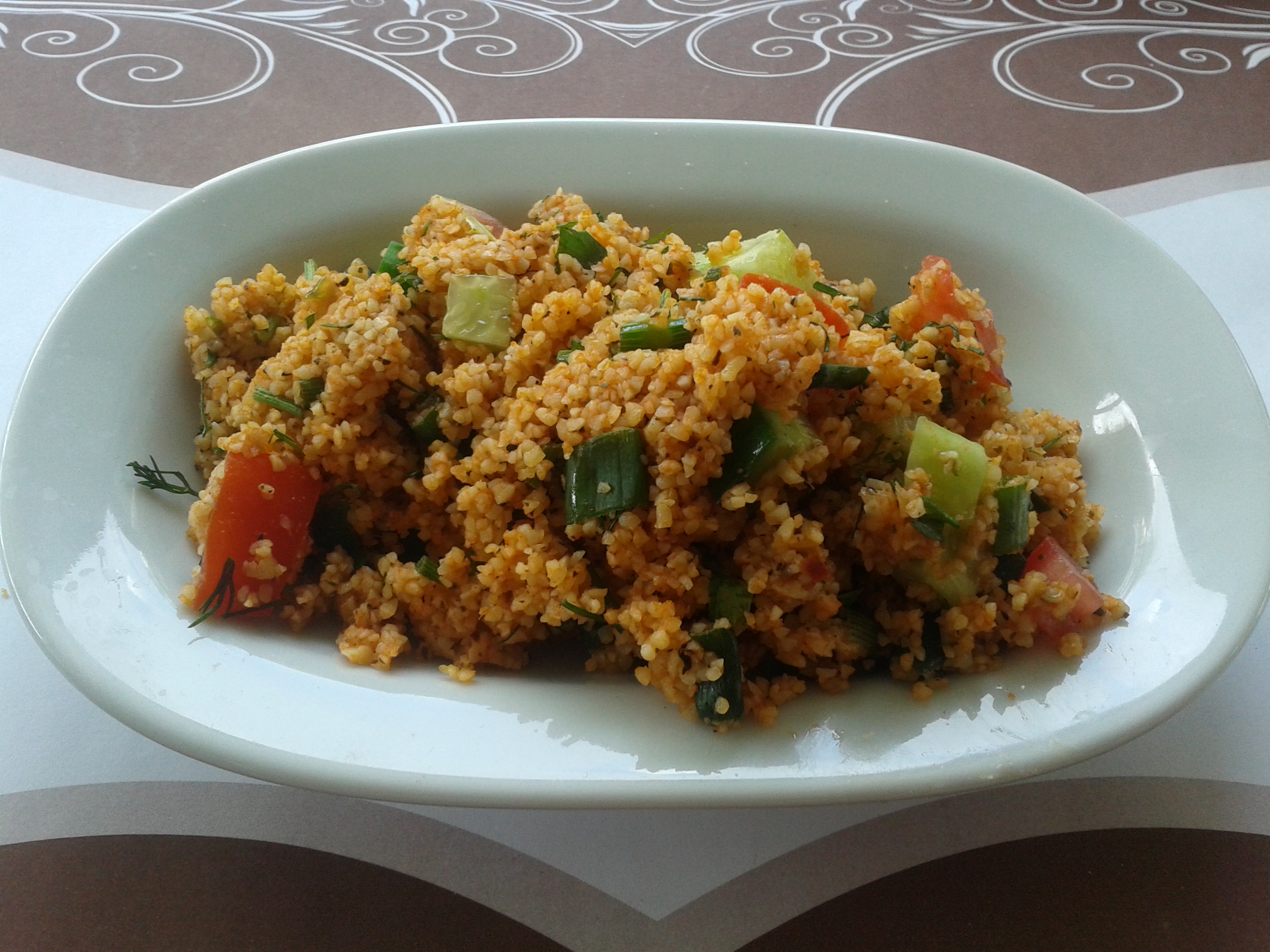
Kısır

- Acılı ezme – hot spicy freshly mashed tomato with onion and green herbs.
- Acuka (also known as 'muhammara') – a spread having both Circassian and Syrian origins, prepared with from Aleppo pepper paste, ground walnuts, tomato paste, bread crumbs, garlic, and spices.
- Çoban salatası – a mixed salad of tomato, cucumber, onion, green peppers, and parsley.
- Deniz börülcesi salatası – a salad made with young shoots of Salicornia europaea (also called common glasswort or marsh samphire), garlic, lemon juice and olive oil.
- Ezme – red pepper, onion, garlic, parsley leaves with tomato paste. The salad is seasoned with lemon, olive oil, cumin, salt and pepper.
- Fava – broad/horse bean puree.
- Gavurdağı salatası
- Hardalotu – mustard plant salad.
- Haydari
- Humus (from the Arabic for "chickpea") – a spread prepared from sesame tahini, chickpeas, garlic, olive oil, and lemon juice.
- Karides (shrimp) – served as a salad, grilled, or stewed with vegetables in a güveç (a casserole).
- Kısır (also known as 'sarma içi') – a very popular meze or side dish prepared with fine-ground bulgur, tomato paste, parsley, onion, garlic, sour pomegranate juice and a lot of spices.
- Semizotu (summer purslane) salatası – served with yogurt.
- Soslu patlıcan – cubed eggplant served in a sauce of olive oil and tomato.
- Tarama – a spread made with fish roe.
- Turp otu salatası
- Zeytin piyazi – olives and green onion salad.

=== Soups ===
A Turkish meal usually starts with a thin soup (çorba). Soups are usually named after their main ingredient, the most common types being mercimek (lentil) çorbası, yogurt, and wheat (often mashed) called tarhana çorbası. Delicacy soups are the ones that are usually not the part of the daily diet, such as İşkembe soup and paça çorbası, although the latter also used to be consumed as a nutritious winter meal. Before the popularisation of the typical Turkish breakfast, soup was the default morning meal for some people. The most common soups in Turkish cuisine are:

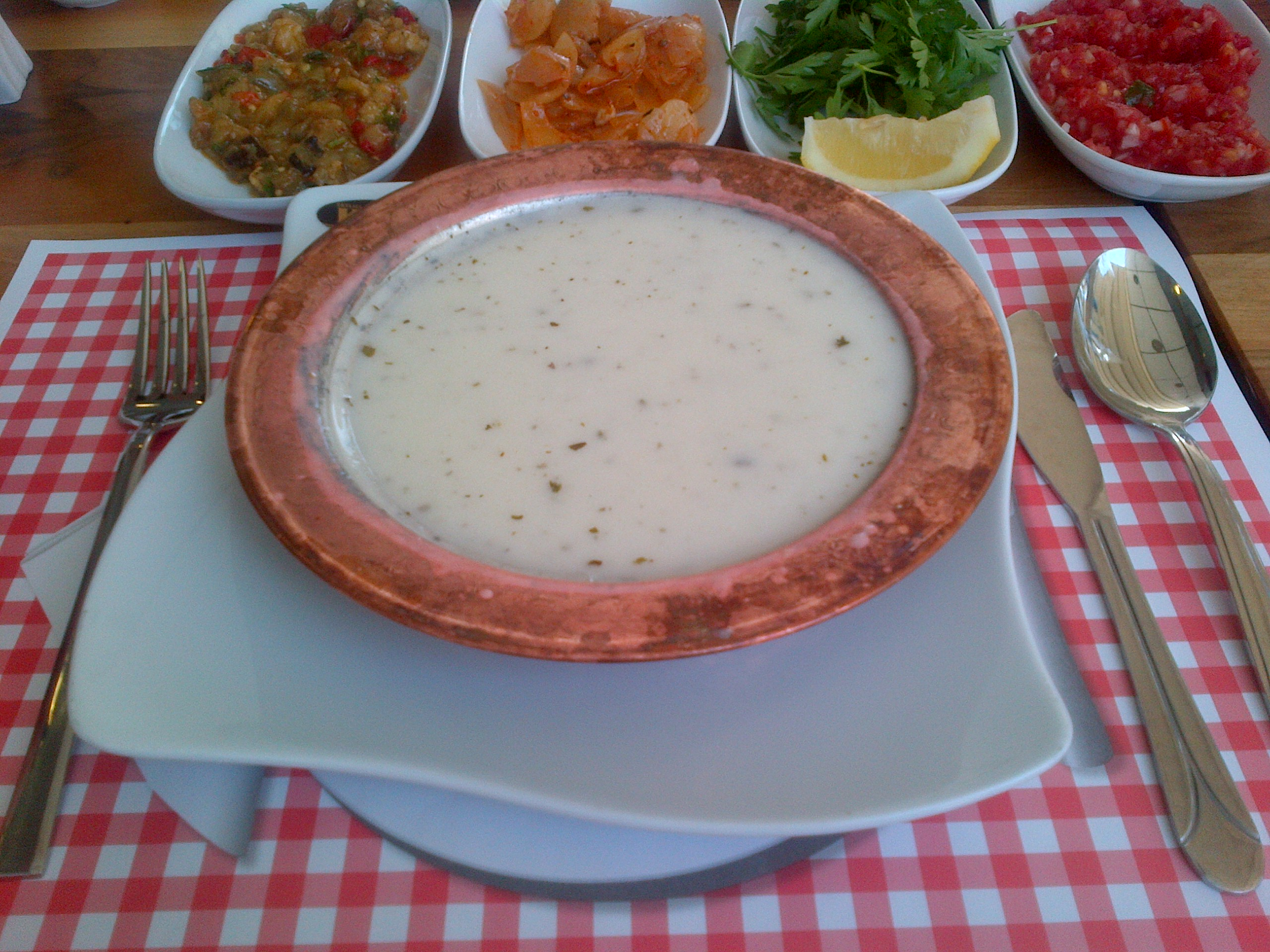
Yayla çorbası, also known as yogurt soup

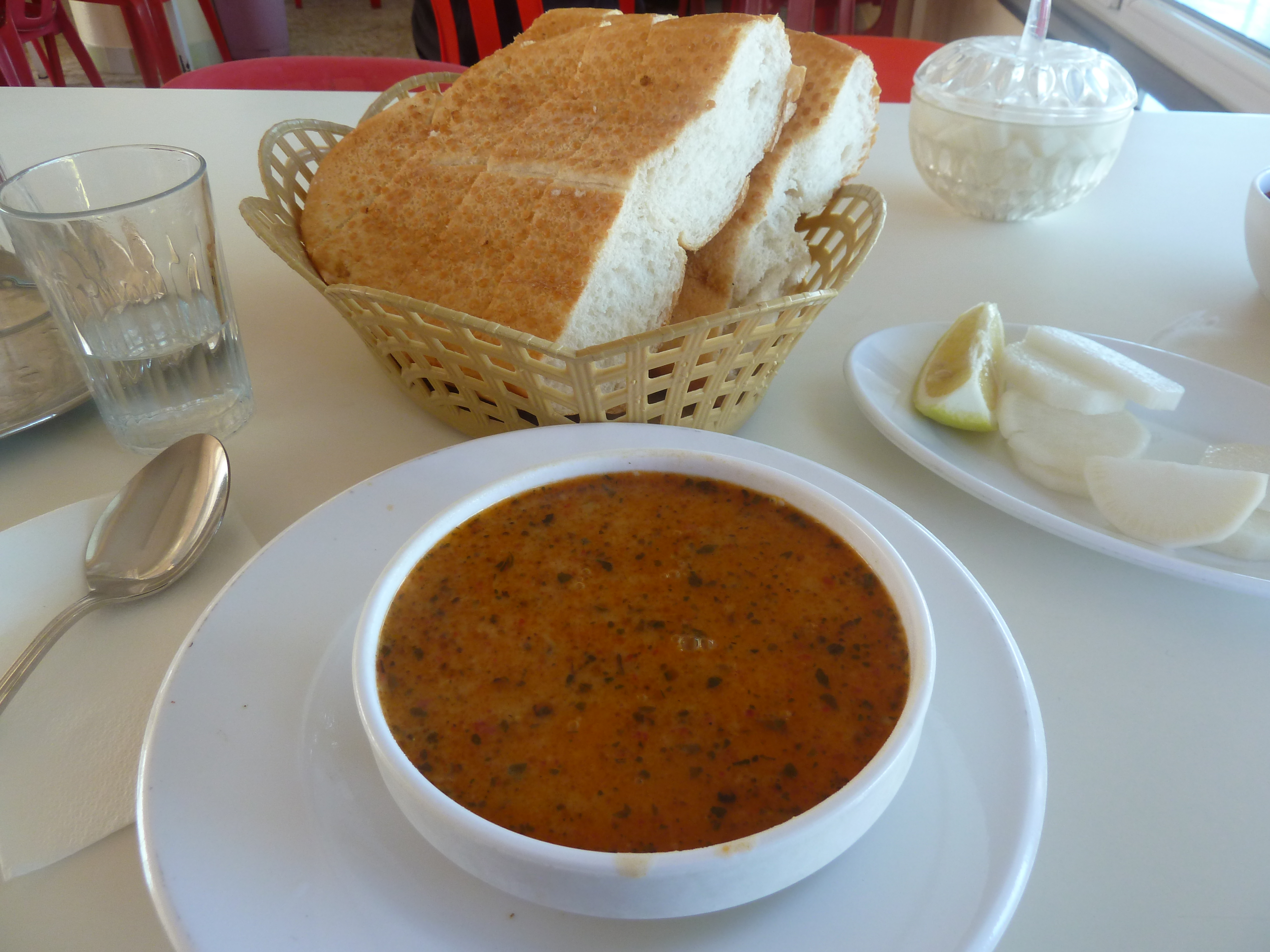
Ezogelin lentil soup

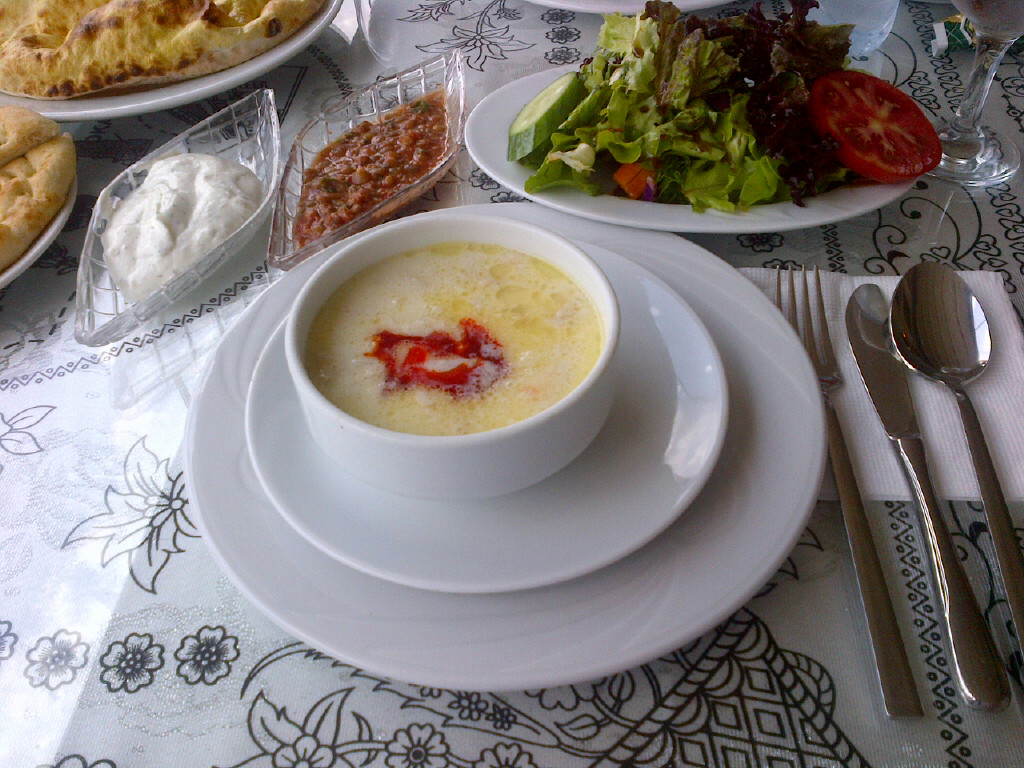
İşkembe

- Analı kızlı soup
- Yayla çorbası
- Erişte aşı
- Buğday aşı/Ayran çorbası – which is served cold.
- Corba
- Domates çorbası (tomato soup)
- Düğün çorbası (wedding soup)
- Ekşi Aşı
- Mercimek çorbası - (lentil soup)
- Ezogelin çorbası - another lentil soup
- İşkembe çorbası
- Karalahana çorbası - soup with cabbage and kidney beans
- Keledoş
- Mahluta
- Paça
- Pazı
- Şehriye
- Sheep's sorrel soup
- Sulu köfte
- Sumak aşı
- Tarhana çorbası
- Tavuk (chicken soup) – with almond it becomes bademli tavuk.
- Toyga soup
- Trabzon Balık çorbası
- Tutmaç (noodles soup with chickpeas and green lentils)
- Yüksük çorbası (contains flour, eggs, salt, tomato paste and plum syrup)
- Arabaşı çorbası

=== Stuffed dishes ===
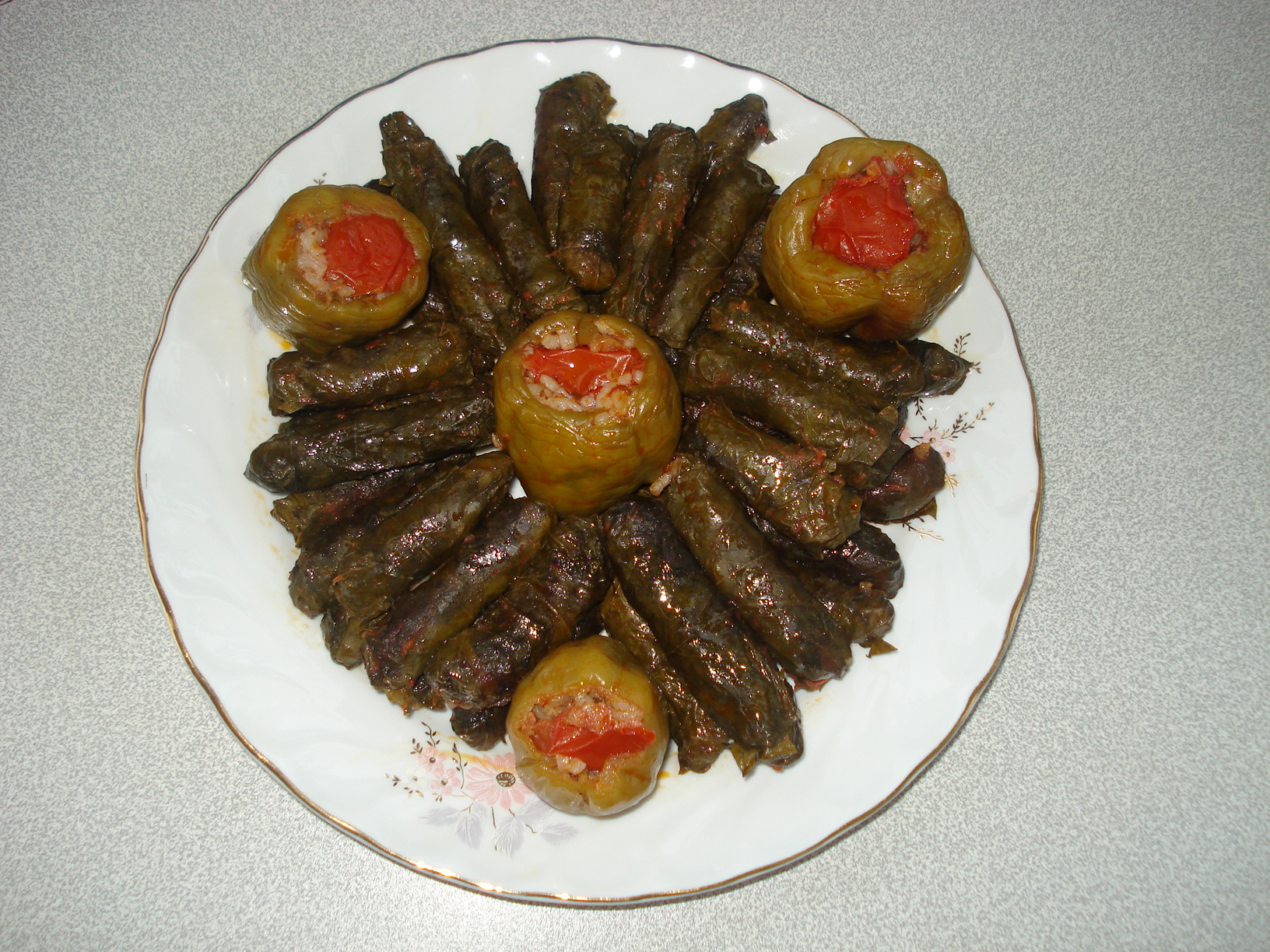
Dolma and sarma platter

Stuffed dishes, known as dolma and sarma, are a fundamental part of Turkish cuisine, offering a rich variety of flavors and textures.

Dolma is a verbal noun of the Turkish verb dolmak 'to be stuffed (or filled)', and means simply 'stuffed thing'. Vegetables like bell peppers, tomatoes, zucchini, and eggplants are commonly filled with seasoned rice, herbs, pine nuts, and currants or minced meat, as seen in biber dolması, while grape (yaprak sarma) or cabbage leaves (lahana sarma) are wrapped around similar fillings. Hearty meat-based dishes include tavuk dolması (stuffed chicken) and hindi dolması (stuffed turkey), both filled with rice, nuts, and dried fruits, as well as kaz dolması (stuffed goose) and kuzu dolması (stuffed lamb), slow-cooked to tender perfection. Other specialties like içli köfte feature crispy bulgur shells filled with spiced meat and walnuts, while seafood lovers enjoy midye dolma (stuffed mussels) with rice and herbs. Melon dolma along with quince or apple dolma was one of the palace's specialties (raw melon stuffed with minced meat, onion, rice, almonds, cooked in an oven). In contemporary Turkey, a wide variety of dolma and sarma is prepared. Although it is not possible to give an exhaustive list of recipes; courgette ("kabak"), aubergine ("patlıcan"), tomato ("domates"), pumpkin ("balkabağı") and chard ("pazı"), constitute some. A different type of dolma is mumbar dolması, for which the membrane of intestines of sheep is filled up with a spicy rice pilav-nut mixture.

Sarma is also a verbal noun of the Turkish verb sarmak 'to wrap', and means simply 'wrapped/wrapping'. Dolma and sarma have a special place in Turkish cuisine. They can be eaten either as a meze or a main dish. They can be cooked either as a vegetable dish or meat dish. If a meat mixture is put in, they are usually served hot with yogurt and spices such as oregano and red pepper powder with oil. If the mixture is vegan, only olive oil, rice or bulgur are used, with some nuts and raisins inside, especially blackcurrant. Zeytinyağlı yaprak sarması (stuffed leaves with olive oil) is the sarma made with vine leaves stuffed with a rice-spice mixture and cooked with olive oil. This type of dolma does not contain meat, is served cold and also referred to as sarma, which means "wrapping" in Turkish. Dried fruit such as blackcurrant, raisins, figs or cherries, and cinnamon and allspice used to be added into the mixture to sweeten zeytinyağlı dolma in Ottoman cuisine. Vine leaves (yaprak) could be filled not only with rice and spices but also with meat and rice, etli yaprak sarma, in which case it was often served hot with yogurt. The word sarma is also used for some types of desserts, such as fıstık sarma (wrapped pistachio).

=== Vegetable dishes ===
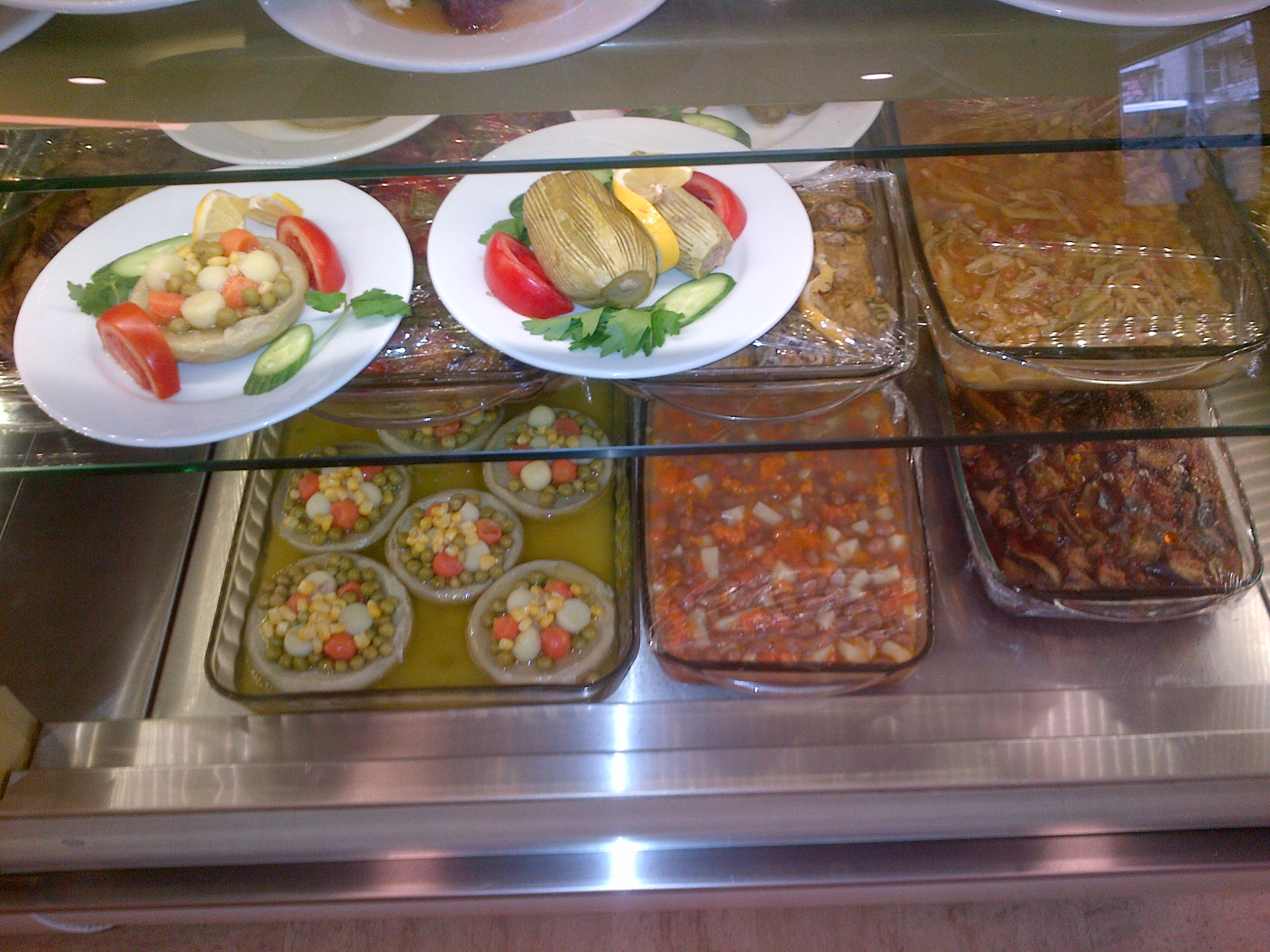
Assortment of zeytinyağlılar

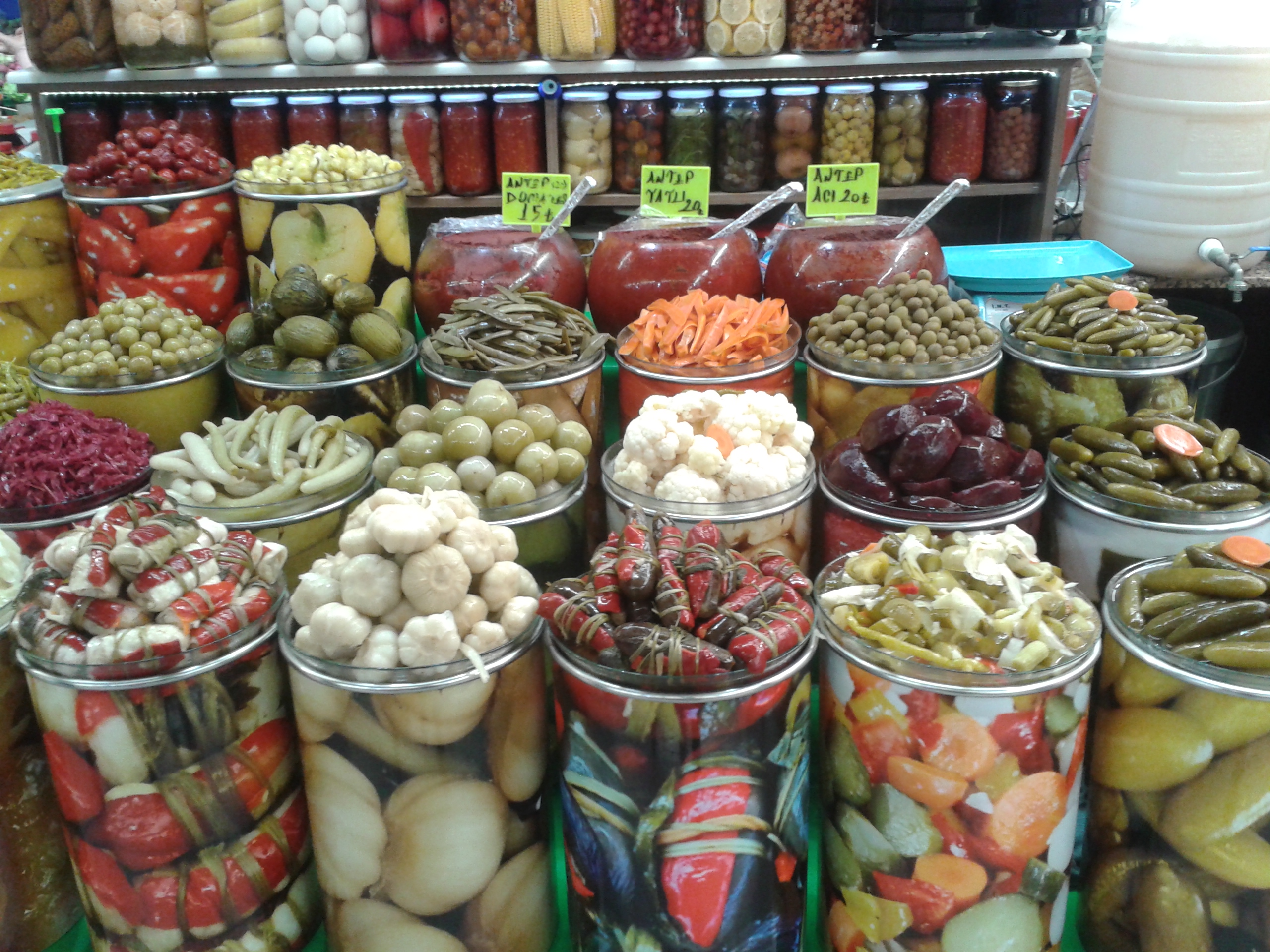
Assortment of turşu

A vegetable dish can be a main course in a Turkish meal. A large variety of vegetables are used, such as spinach, leek, cauliflower, artichoke, cabbage, celery, eggplant, green and red bell peppers, string beans and sunchokes. A typical vegetable dish is prepared with a base of chopped onions and carrots sautéed first in olive oil and later with tomatoes or tomato paste. The vegetables and hot water will then be added, and frequently spoonfuls of rice and lemon juice as well. Vegetable dishes are usually served with the cooking water, and are thus called in colloquial Turkish sulu yemek (literally "a dish with juice"). Minced meat can also be added to a vegetable dish, but vegetable dishes that are cooked with olive oil (zeytinyağlılar) are often served cold and do not contain meat. Spinach, leeks, string beans and artichokes with olive oil are among the most widespread dishes in Turkey.

Stuffed vegetables are called dolma. Many vegetables are stuffed, most typically green peppers (biber dolması), eggplants, tomatoes, zucchini (courgettes) (kabak dolması), and vine leaves (yaprak dolması) pickled in brine. Many other vegetables and fruits are stuffed with a meat or pilav mixture. For example, artichoke dolma (enginar dolması) is an Aegean region specialty. Dolma may be stuffed with parts of the vegetable carved out for preparation, pilav with spices or minced meat.

İmam bayıldı is a version of karnıyarık with no minced meat inside. It can be served as a meze as well. Another popular dish of Arabic origin (the Levant region) is baba ghanoush (also called abugannush), a purée of smoked eggplants with tahini sauce.

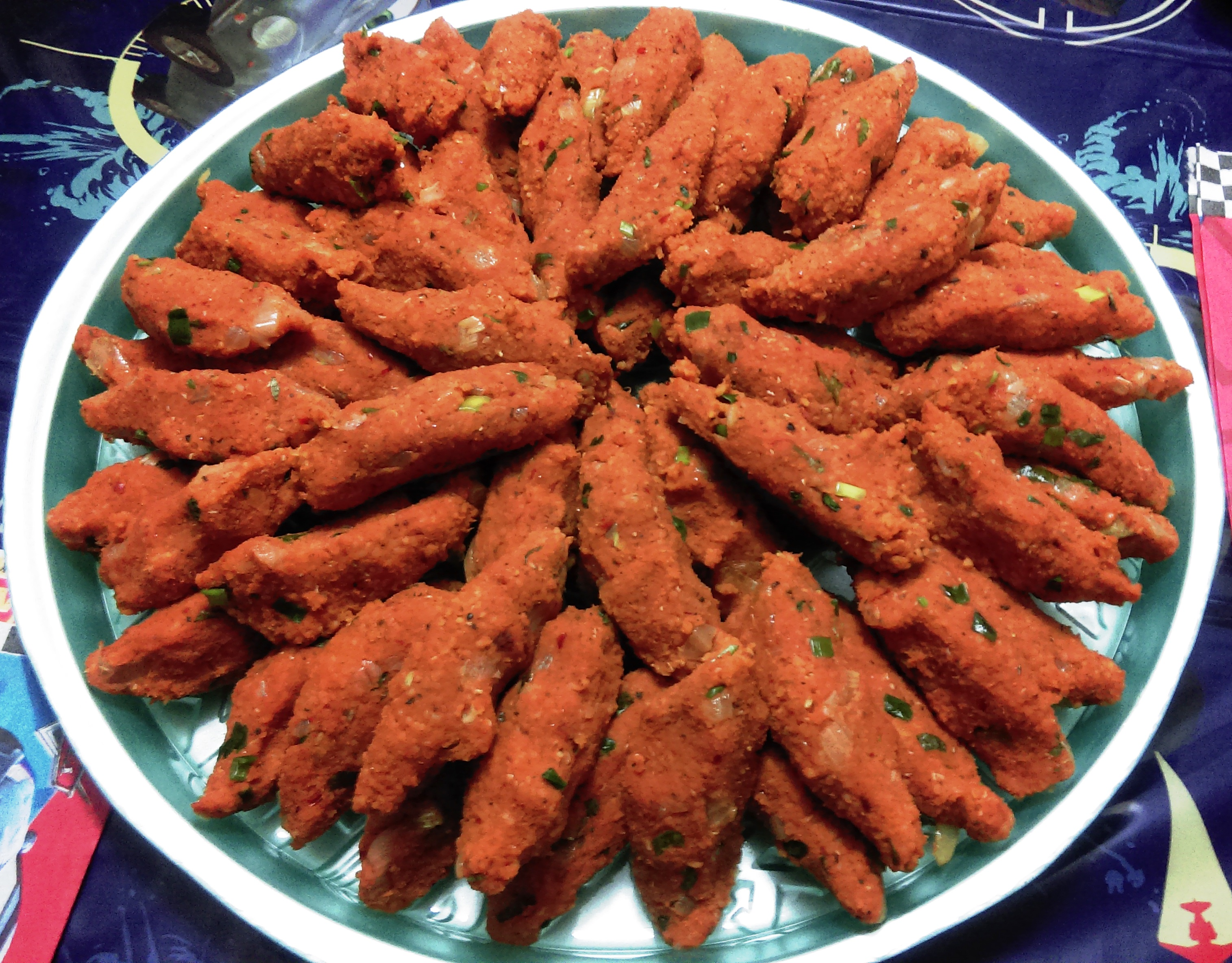
Mercimek köftesi, lentil balls

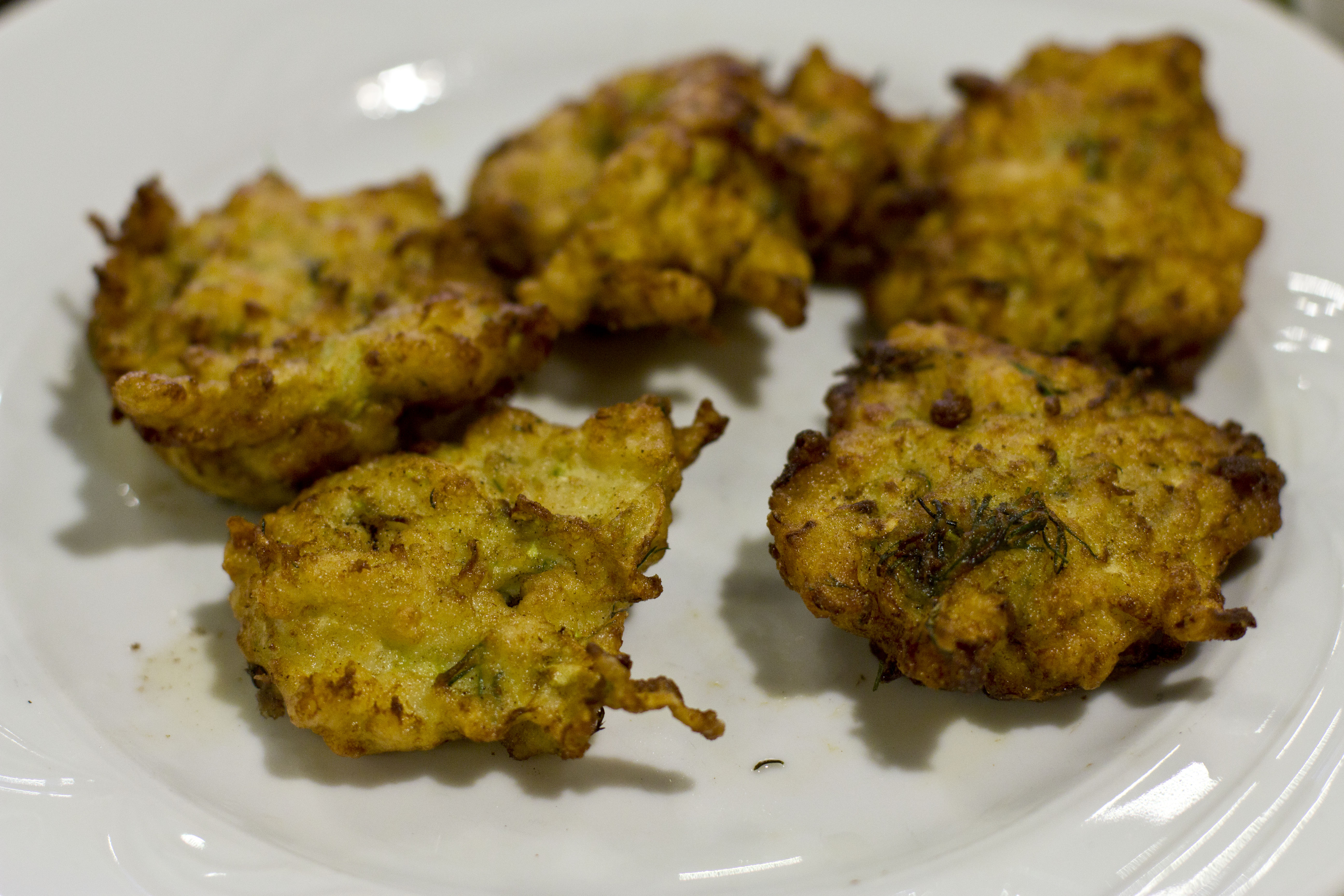
Mücver

Mercimek köftesi, although being named köfte, does not contain any meat. Instead, red lentils are the major ingredient, together with spring onion, tomato paste, and other ingredients.

Mücver is prepared with grated squash, courgette or potatoes mixed with egg, onion, dill or cheese and flour. It can be fried or baked.

Pilav can be served either as a side dish or main dish; bulgur pilavı (pilav made of bulgur) is also widely eaten.

Legumes are commonly used, especially kidney beans, chickpeas, fava beans, and red and green lentils. Dishes made with kuru fasulye (white beans), nohut (chickpeas), mercimek (lentils), börülce (black-eyed peas), or other legumes, combined with onion, vegetables, minced meat, tomato paste and rice, have always been common due to being economical and nutritious.

Turşu are pickles made with brine, usually with garlic added. It is often enjoyed as an appetizer. A variety of vegetables are used, from cucumber to courgette. In towns on the Aegean coast, the water of turşu is consumed as a drink. The name comes from the Persian "torshi", which refers to pickled "torsh" (sour) vegetables.

Siron, usually made in areas of Elazig and Sivas by layering flatbread with yogurt and butter, creating a savory and rich flavor.

=== Street food ===
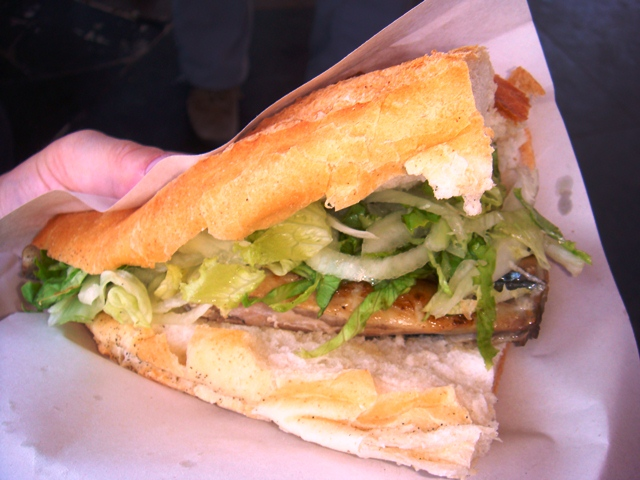
Balık-ekmek

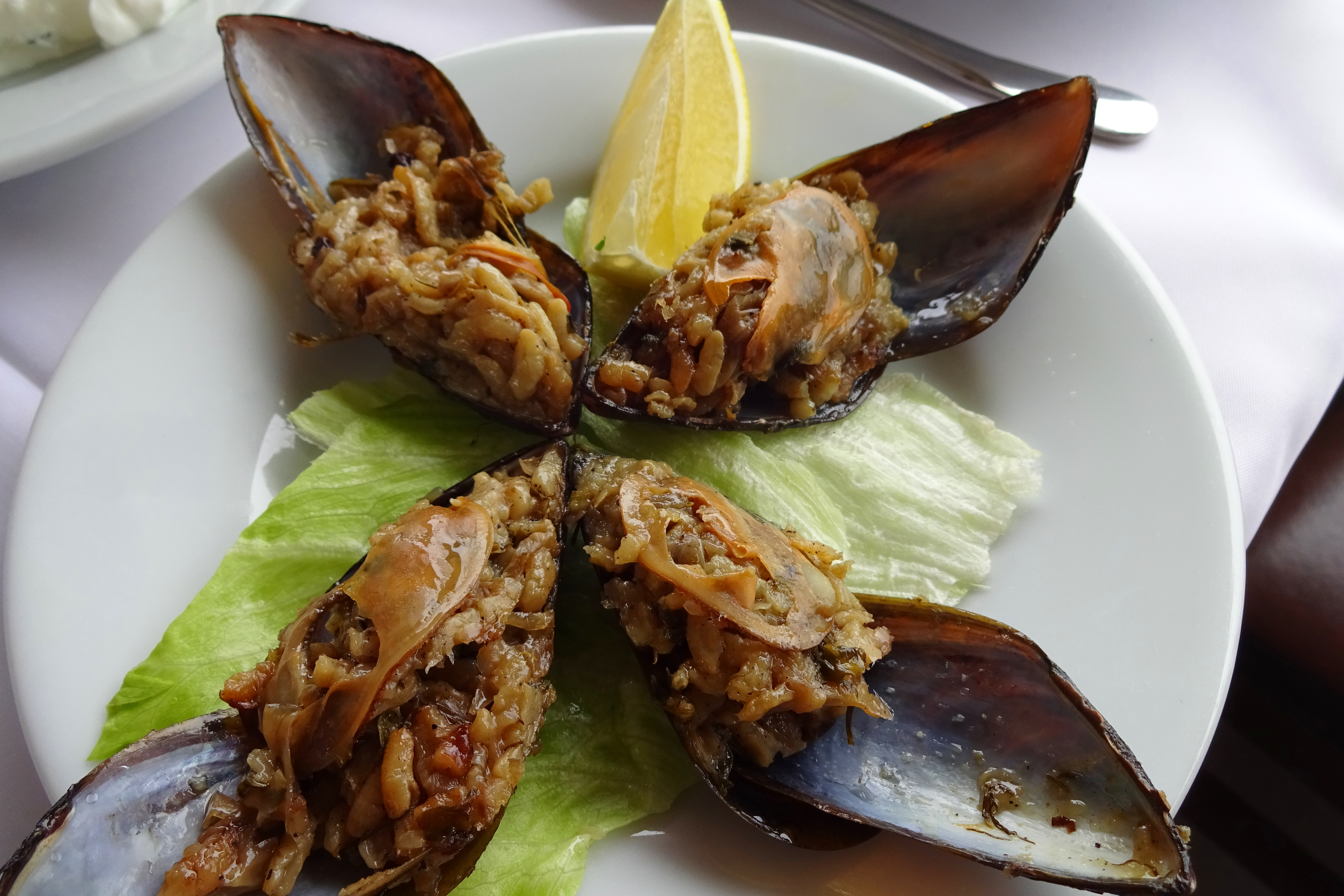
Midye dolma

- Dondurma – Turkish ice cream
- Buzlu badem – Iced almonds
- Midye dolma – fried or stuffed mussels
- Taze ceviz – fresh walnuts
- Gözleme – thin flatbread called yufka stuffed with potato, white or kaşar cheese, spinach, ground meat or other ingredients, with or without spices, traditionally cooked over a sač (traditional cooking equipment)
- Kokoreç
- Balık ekmek – fish sandwich
- Sucuk ekmek
- Köfte ekmek
- Kumpir – a baked potato served with kaşar cheese and many other toppings
- Lokma – fried balls made of yeast-leavened dough, oil, sugar syrup or honey
- Közde mısır – roasted corn
- Kestane – roasted chestnuts
- Simit
- Macun
- Bici bici – starch cubes covered with shaved ice with syrup and fruit

== Beverages ==
=== Alcoholic beverages ===
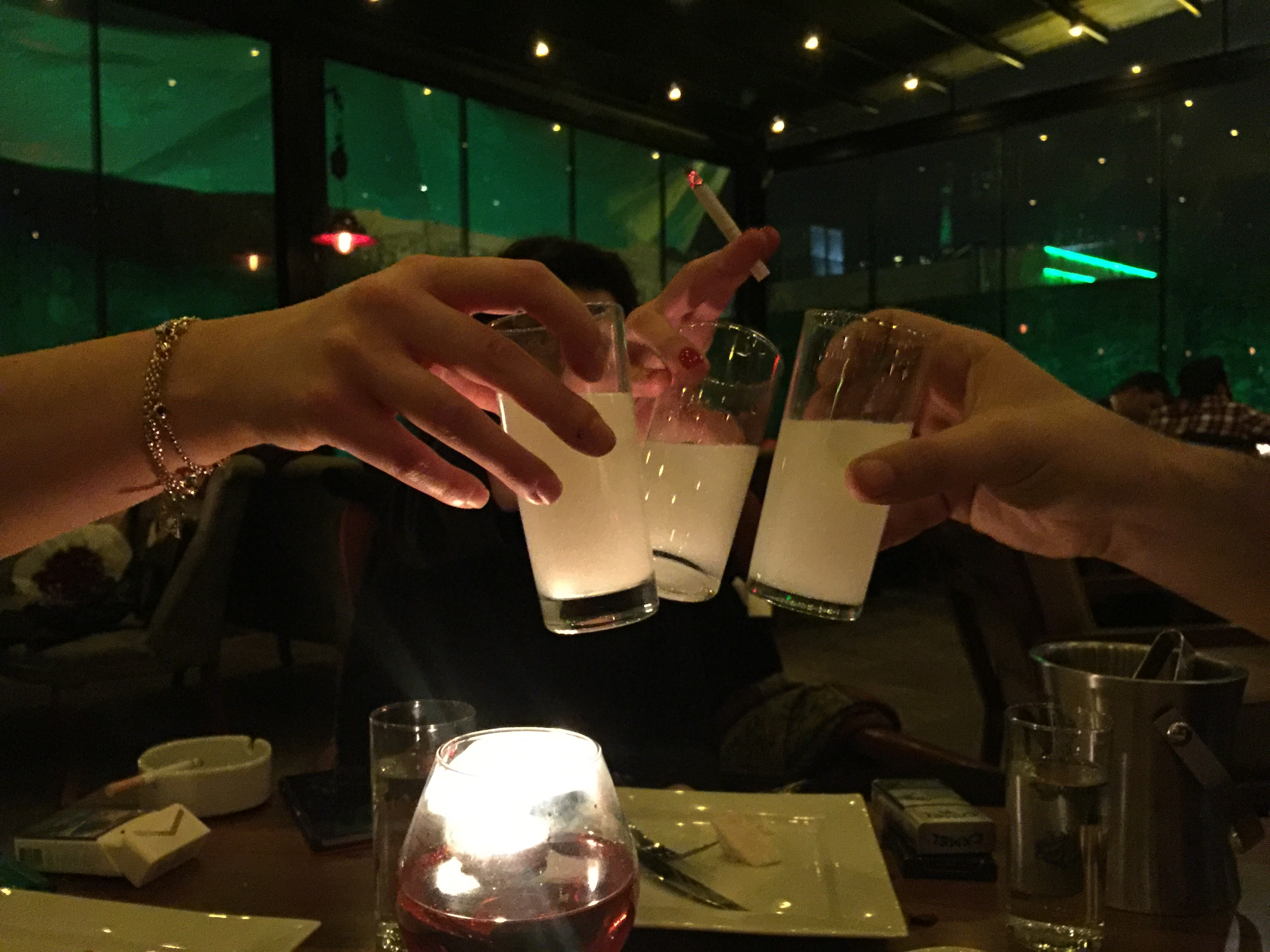
Toasting with rakı, in typical rakı glasses

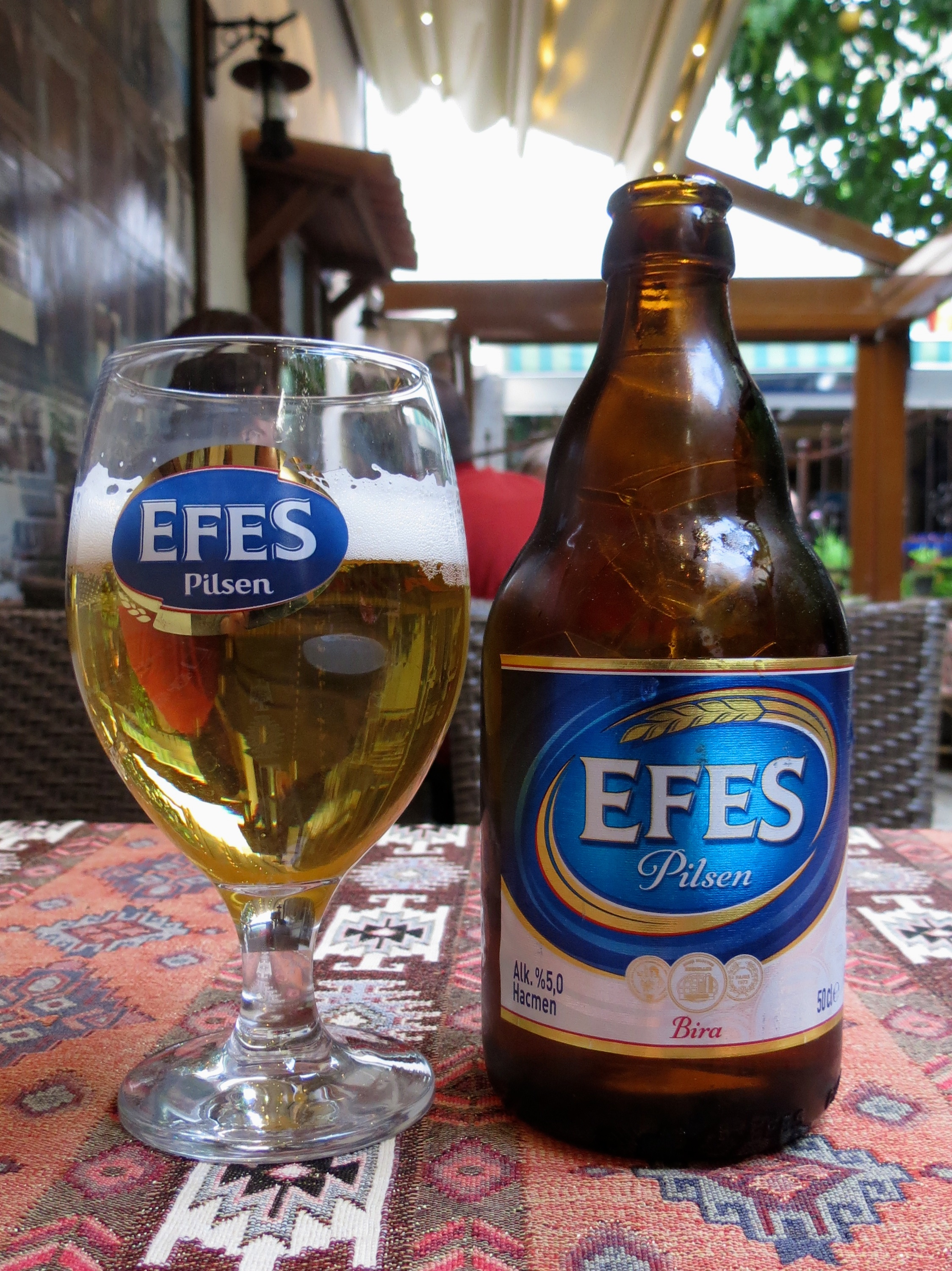
A Turkish beer brand, Efes Pilsen

Although the majority of Turks profess the Islamic religion, alcoholic beverages are as widely available as anywhere. Rakı (pronounced [ɾaˈkɯ]) is the most popular alcoholic drink in Turkey.

There are a few local brands of lager such as Bomonti, Marmara 34 and Efes Pilsen and a small selection of international beers that are produced in Turkey such as Skol, Beck's, Miller, Foster's, Carlsberg and Tuborg. In Turkey, craft beers became popular in present-day; Gara Guzu, Feliz Kulpa, Pablo and Graf are some Turkish craft beer brands.

There are a variety of local wines produced by Turkish brands such as Sevilen, Kavaklıdere, Doluca, Corvus, Kayra, Pamukkale and Diren which are getting more popular with the change of climatic conditions that affect the production of wine. A range of grape varieties are grown in Turkey. For the production of red wine, the following types of grapes are mainly used; in the Marmara Region, Pinot noir, Adakarası, Papazkarası, Semillion, Kuntra, Gamay, Cinsault; in the Aegean Region, Carignane, Çalkarası, Merlot, Cabernet Sauvignon, Alicante Bouschet; in the Black Sea Region and the eastern part of the country, Öküzgözü, Boğazkere; in Central Anatolia, Kalecik Karası, Papazkarası, Dimrit; in the Mediterranean Region, Sergi Karası, Dimrit. As for white wine, the grapes can be listed as follows; in the Marmara Region, Chardonnay, Riesling, Semillion, Beylerce, Yapıncak; in the Aegean Region, muscat and semillion; in the Black Sea Region, Narince; in Central Anatolia, Emir, Goat Cheese. In addition to mass production, it is quite popular to produce wines in private farms and sell them in the locality. Visitors can find different "home made" wines in Central Anatolia (Kapadokya/Cappadocia region – Nevşehir), the Aegean coast (Selçuk and Bozcaada (an island in the Aegean Sea)).

Ankara was the first and only whiskey produced in Turkey. Its production started in 1964 and ended in 2011.

=== Non-alcoholic beverages ===
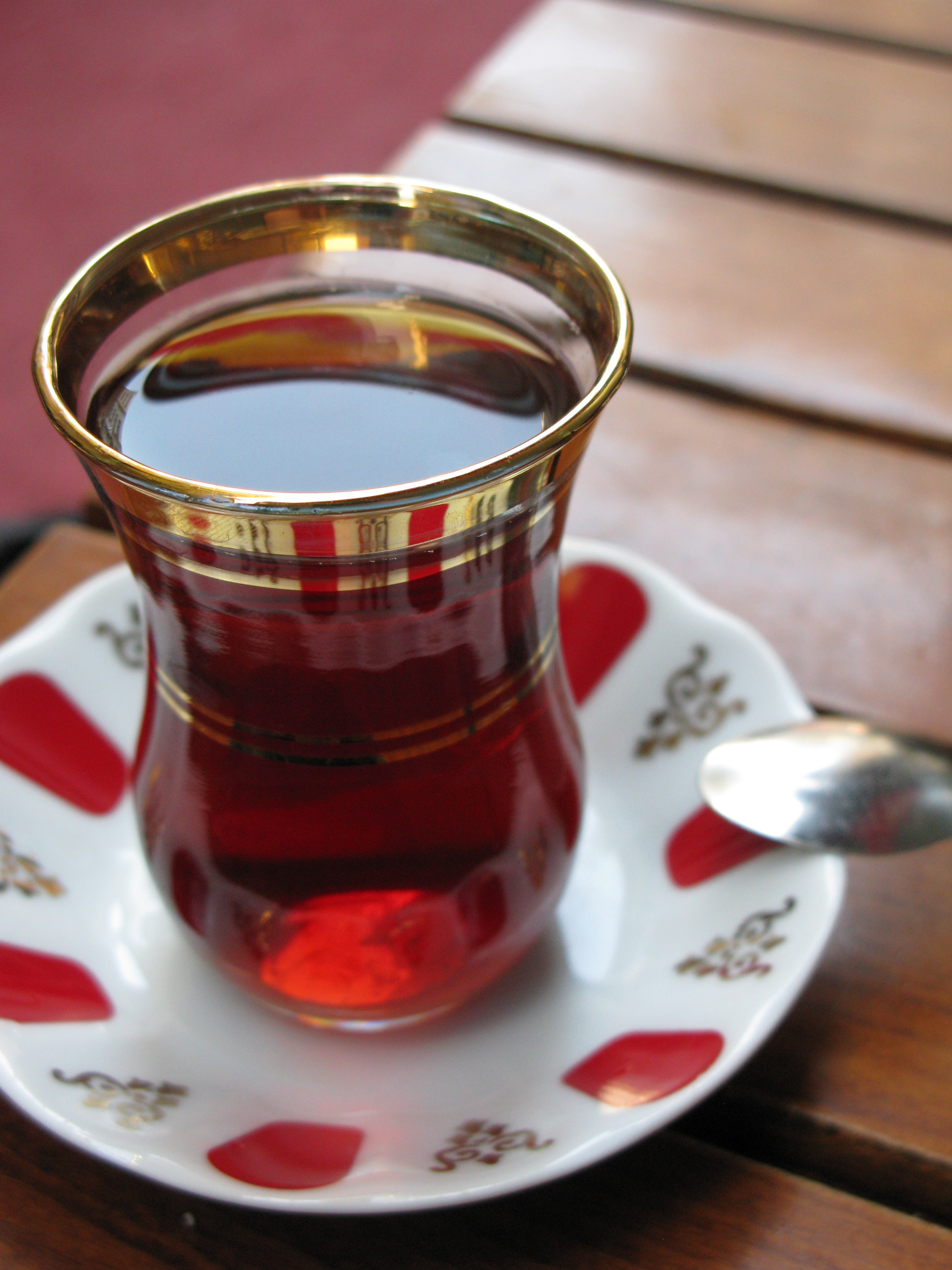
Turkish tea

At breakfast and all day long Turkish people drink black tea (çay). Tea is made with two teapots in Turkey. Strong bitter tea made in the upper pot is diluted by adding boiling water from the lower. Turkish coffee (kahve) is usually served after meals or with dessert.

Ayran (yogurt drink) is the most common cold beverage, which may accompany almost all dishes in Turkey, except those with fish and other seafood. It is a mix of yogurt and water, similar to lassi. It may be served with salt, according to taste.

Şalgam suyu (mild or spicy fermented black carrot juice) is another important non-alcoholic beverage that is usually combined with kebabs or served together with rakı.

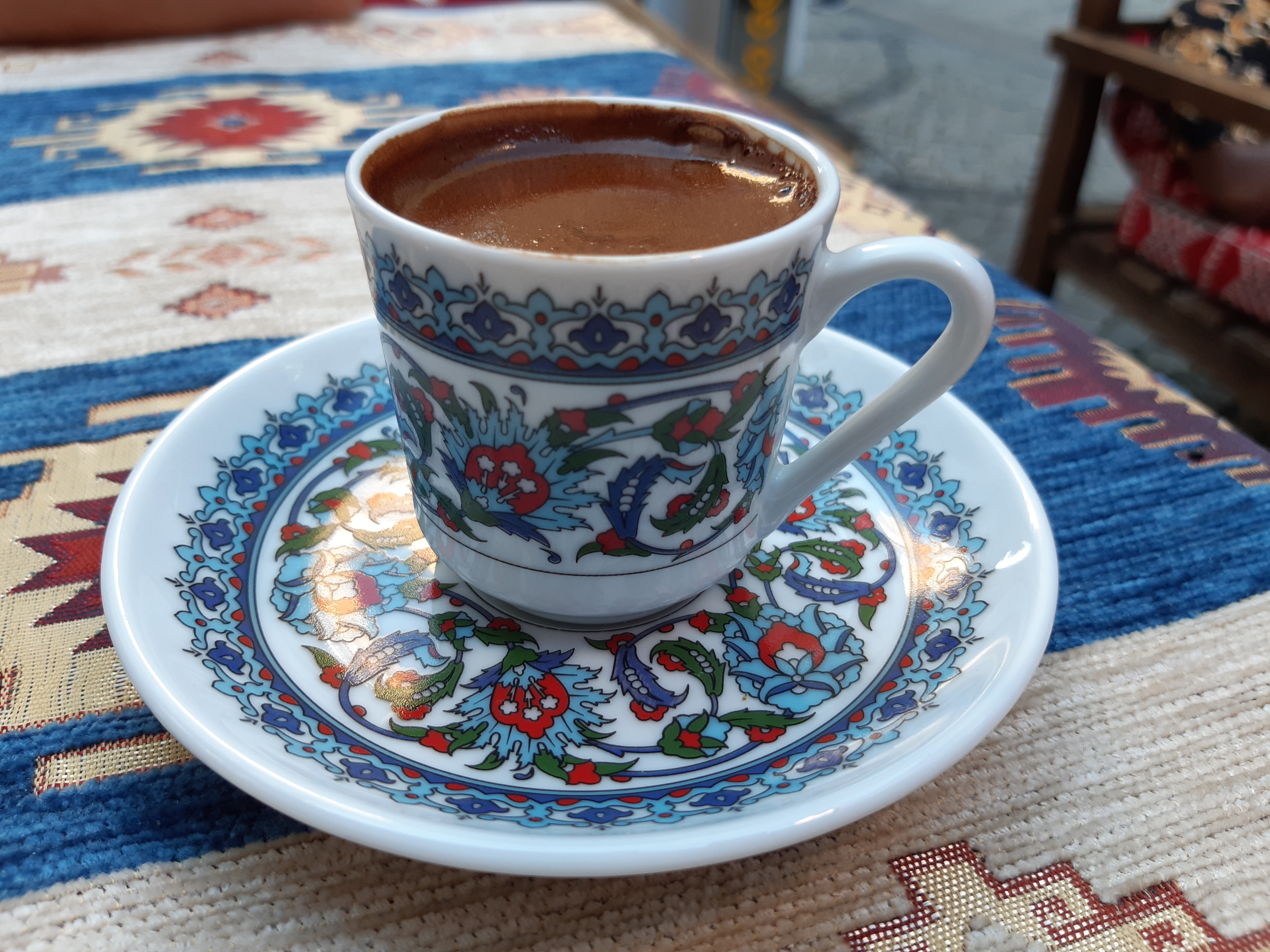
Turkish coffee

Boza is a traditional winter drink, which is also known as millet wine (served cold with cinnamon and sometimes with leblebi).

Sahlep is another favorite in winter (served hot with cinnamon). Sahlep is extracted from the roots of wild orchids and may be used in Turkish ice cream as well. This was a popular drink in western Europe before coffee was brought from Africa and came to be widely known.

Limonata (lemonade) is very popular. It is traditionally served with baklava and other sweets. Sometimes lemonade is served with strawberry flavoring. This is called çilekli limonata.

Sherbet (Turkish şerbet, pronounced [ʃeɾˈbet]) is a syrup which can be made from any of a wide variety of ingredients, especially fruits, flowers, or herbs. Examples include pears, quinces, strawberries, apples, cornelian cherry, pomegranates, oranges, rose petals, rose hips, or licorice and spices. Sherbet is drunk diluted with cold water.

Lohusa şerbeti is a beverage usually given to women after childbirth.

In classical Turkish cuisine, hoşaf (from the Persian "Khosh-ab", meaning "fresh water") alternatively accompanies meat dishes and pilav (pilaf).

== Turkish chefs ==
- Hakki Akdeniz
- Salt Bae
- Emel Başdoğan
- CZN Burak
- Ebru Demir
- Mehmet Gürs
- Deniz Orhun
- Kadir Nurman
- Selin Kiazim
- Silvena Rowe
- Somer Sivrioğlu
- Ismail Tosun
- Fatih Tutak
- Hüseyin Özer

== Related cuisines ==
- Ottoman cuisine
- Balkan cuisine
  - Albanian cuisine
  - Bosnian cuisine
  - Bulgarian cuisine
  - Hungarian cuisine
  - Macedonian cuisine
  - Moldovan cuisine
  - Montenegrin cuisine
  - Romani cuisine
  - Romanian cuisine
  - Serbian cuisine
  - Armenian cuisine
  - Azerbaijani cuisine
- Central Asian cuisine
  - Kazakh cuisine
  - Kyrgyz cuisine
  - Turkmen cuisine
  - Uzbek cuisine
- Mediterranean cuisine
  - Algerian cuisine
  - Cypriot cuisine
  - Egyptian cuisine
  - Greek cuisine
  - Sephardic Jewish cuisine
- Middle Eastern cuisine
  - Assyrian cuisine
  - Iranian cuisine
  - Iraqi cuisine
  - Kurdish cuisine
  - Levantine cuisine
    - Israeli cuisine
    - Jordanian cuisine
    - Lebanese cuisine
    - Palestinian cuisine

== See also ==
- Osman Güldemir
- Nevin Halıcı
- Mangal

== Bibliography ==
- Budak, Süheyl, Antakya Mutfağı, Hatay 2008, OCLC 705454123 (1996 edition).
- Antakya-cuisine with Süheyl Budak and 75 ladies
- Gürsoy, Deniz, Turkish Cuisine in Historical Perspective, Istanbul, 2006. ISBN 975-329-564-2.
- Halıcı, Nevin, Konya Yemek Kültürü ve Konya Yemekleri, Istanbul 2005. ISBN 975-6021-16-0.
- Halıcı, Nevin, Sufi Cuisine, Saqi 2005.
- Lambraki, Mirsini & Akın, Engin, Aynı Sofrada İki Ülke, Türk ve Yunan Mutfağı, Istanbul 2003. ISBN 975-458-484-2.
- Roden, Claudia, A New Book of Middle Eastern Food, 2000. ISBN 0-14-046588-X.
- Şavkay, Turgut, Halk Mutfağımız Geleneksel Tatlarımızdan Seçmeler, Istanbul 2005. ISBN 975-98180-2-7.
- Şavkay, Turgut, Turkish Cuisine, Istanbul 2003. ISBN 975-285-114-2
- Ünsal, Artun & Süt, Uyuyunca, Türkiye Peynirleri, Istanbul. ISBN 975-363-755-1.
- Ünsal, Artun & Silivrim, Kaymak, Türkiye'nin Yoğurtları, Istanbul 2007. ISBN 978-975-08-1276-7.
- Yerasimos, Marianna, Osmanlı Mutfağı, Istanbul 2002; published in English as 500 Years of Ottoman Cuisine.
- Zubaida, Sami & Tapper, Richard, A Taste of Thyme: Culinary Cultures of the Middle East, London and New York, 1994 and 2000. ISBN 1-86064-603-4.
