= List of Turkish desserts =

This is a list of desserts from Turkish cuisine.

Name of dessert	Image	Type	Description
Acıbadem kurabiyesi		Biscuit	Almond biscuits made from bitter almonds or bitter almond syrup. Well established in Edirne.
Alaçatı kurabiyesi		Cookie	Non-dairy Cookie that is flavored with mastic flavor. Alaçatı is a neighborhood of İzmir, the area where this cookie originated from.
Aşure		Pudding	Sweet pudding that is made of a mixture consisting of various types of grains, fresh and dried fruits, and nuts.
Ayva tatlısı		Fruit	A fruit-based dessert made with quince originating in the city of Bursa.
Badem ezmesi		Nuts	Marzipan
Bağdat hurma tatlısı		Fried dough dessert	Pastry dessert consisting of flour, sugar, egg, yogurt and 10 kind of spices. Served with grated coconut.
Baklava		Phyllo pastry	A type of phyllo pastry filled with finely chopped nuts and soaked in sharbat syrup. One variation is Soğuk Baklava, which replaces the syrup with milk and adds cocoa on top.
Bağaça		Tahini cookie	Bağaça is a kind of tahini cookie originated from Antalya. Ingredient in use are tahini, sesame seeds, mastic, chickpea yeast, cinnamon, milk, flour, butter and sugar.
Bici bici		Non-dairy ice	A shaved ice dessert, sweetened with powdered sugar and a red fruit or flower syrup. Additional toppings are added, usually fruits. Originating in the city of Adana. Although the taste is different, due to the use of different toppings and syrup, it is very similar to Korea's Bingsu
Biga peynir tatlısı		Pastry	Made of unsalted cheese, dough of flour, egg, water and baking powder
Cezerye		Candy	Turkish gelatinous sweet made from caramelised carrots, shredded coconut and roasted nuts
Cevizli sucuk		Candy	Walnuts lined on a strand coated in thickened grape or mulberry juice and dried to resemble sausages
Demir tatlısı		Fried batter	Fried cookie made with an iron mold
Dilber dudağı		Pastry	Buttery pastry soaked in sharbat syrup.
Dondurma or Maraş dondurması		Ice cream	Traditional Turkish ice cream famous for its sellers joking around with customers. The most traditional taste is called Damla sakızı, or, in a literal translation ‘Gummy Drops’. In the Greek society it's known as the ‘Tears of Chios’. Both refer to the mastic taste obtained from the mastic tree and salep is also added. This ice cream originated in the city of Kahramanmaraş, hence the name ‘Maraş ice cream’. Görele dondurması is a variation from Giresun that additionally adds licorice root
Ekmek kadayıfı		Pastry	The bread or sponge cake dough is mixed with pistachios and hazelnuts before being baked. Then, it will be drenched in a sweet sharbat syrup and served with fresh clotted cream. Originating in the city of Afyonkarahisar
Fıstıklı dürüm		Baklava	A kind of rolled, green baklava made with very thin layers of philo dough and thick layers of pistachio
Gaziler helvası		Halva	A type of almond helva from Edirne which has been traditionally served on special occasions
Güllaç		Dairy, Nut	Consists of milk, rose water and a kind of special very thin dough also called güllaç. Optionally, it can be served with some fruits like pomegranate and nuts on top. It is said that it was first made in the Ottoman palace's kitchen by Chef cook Ali from Kastamonu in 1489.
Halka tatlısı		Donut	Type of pastry fried in oil and sweetened with sharbat syrup.
Hanım göbeği		Fried dough	Deep fried choux pastry balls soaked in simple syrup
Hayrabolu tatlısı		Fritter	Fried pastry originating from Hayrabolu made from cheese and semolina, decorated with tahin and hazelnuts. It resembles the Kemalpaşa tatlısı and Biga peynir tatlısı
Helatiye		Pudding	
Hoşaf		Fruit	Stewed dried fruits optionally spiced with cloves or cinnamon, may be served cold over rice
Hoşmerim		Halva	Also called cheese halvah, homemade hoşmerim is made from cheese, semolina and powdered sugar and often served with ice cream, honey or nuts. It has originated in the region of Marmara, with Balıkesir being the most known for it.
İncir uyuşturması or İncir uyutması, or, 'bring the figs to sleep'		Dairy, fruit	Dairy dessert made from dried figs, cow milk, goat milk and sugar. From the city of İzmir.
İrmik helvası		Halva	Type of halva consisting of semolina, milk, butter and sugar. Also pine nut is generally added.
İzmir bombası (Bomb of İzmir or İzmir bomb)		Praline stuffed cookies/kurabiye	Cookies filled with chocolate spread that leave a bomb of chocolatey explosions in your mouth. Originated in the Aegean city of İzmir.
Kabak tatlısı		Fruit	Candied pumpkin garnished with walnuts and fresh kaymak cream (sometimes) (also sometimes topped with tahin).
Kadayıf		Shredded phyllo pastry	Made with kadaif noodles. Sweetened with sharbat.
Kadayıf dolması		Shredded phyllo pastry	Tel kadayıf with walnut wrapped in it coated in egg and milk, fried and soaked in sharbat syrup.
Kalburabastı	Baklava Göreme	Pastry	Syrup-drenched pastries often served during the Islamic holidays
Katmer		Phyllo pastry	Flaky pastry similar to baklava. Its filling consists of kaymak (sort of creamy dairy product), pistachio, sugar.
Kaysefe		Fruit	Stewed dried fruits topped with melted butter and chopped nuts
Kazandibi		Pudding	Caramelized version of tavuk göğsü
Kemalpaşa tatlısı		Pastry	
Kestane şekeri		Candy	Chestnut candied in sugar syrup. (Marron glacé)
Keşkül		Pudding	Almond based milk pudding
Kireçte kabak tatlısı		Fruit	Pumpkin pieces soaked in lime water for a long time; by this process, it has cruncy and candy like texture. After this process, they are boiled in sharbat syrup. Served with tahini.
Künefe		Shredded phyllo pastry	Tel kadayıf dough filled with a layer of cheese and soaked in sharbat syrup.
Laz böreği		Phyllo pastry	Consists of thin phyllo dough, butter, muhallebi, black pepper and simple syrup.
Lokma		Fried dough dessert	Leavened, deep fried dough soaked in sharbat syrup and topped with coconut powder, cinnamon powder, pistachio or hazelnut powder, chocolate sauce, fruits or other toppings. Traditionally, this dessert doesn't use toppings. Very common in Aegean cities such as İzmir or Ayvalık.
Lokum		Candy	In the English speaking world it is known as “Turkish delight”. It is eaten together with Turkish coffee to compensate the strong taste.
Lor tatlısı		Pastry	This sweet pastry is made from whey cheese and usually served with mastic flavored traditional Turkish ice cream. It is a local specialty dessert from the coastal town Ayvalık in the Aegean region of Turkey.
Macun		Fluid candy	Turkish toffee candy, that is not hard but soft and is stretched over a stick and eaten like a Lollipop.
Met helvası		Halva	Compact and cylinder like shaped version of pişmaniye.
Muhallebi		Pudding, dairy	Milk pudding
Muska pestili		Fruit and nuts	Triangle shaped pestil filled with hazelnut pastry or any other nuts.
Nevzine		Cake	Made with tahini, pekmez and walnut
Orcik candy		Candy	Candy coated walnut and fermented grape juice mixture
Pepeçura		Mousse	Isabella grape must thickened with corn flour and / or corn starch and mixed with sugar
Pestil		Fruit	Fruit leather
Peynir helvası		Halva	Consists of lor (curd) cheese, butter, semolina, sugar. Its top can be caramelized in oven or served without baking.
Pişmaniye		Halva	Flour roasted in butter blended into pulled sugar. Also called çekme helva, or pulled helva. It often reminds people of cotton candy, but it is very different in taste and texture. It is very similar (in taste and texture and in the making) of the Korean Kkul-tarae and China's Dragon's Beard Candy
Pürüzyen		Pastry	U shaped pastry filled with almond paste and sprinkled with sugar on top.
Revani		Cake	Semolina cake soaked in sharbat syrup
Saray helvası		Halva	Firmer and more compact version of pişmaniye.
Su muhallebisi		Pudding	Type of pudding made with water, milk, starch. It is generally served with rose water and powdered sugar. Optionally, melted kızamık şekeri (kind of spicy sugar mixture) can be poured on it when served.
Şambali		Pastry	Made with semolina, sugar and yogurt or milk.
Şekerpare		Pastry	Soft almond pastry soaked in lemon-flavored sharbat syrup
Şıllık		Crepe	Turkish dessert crepe filled with walnut and topped with sweet syrup and chopped pistachio
Şöbiyet		Phyllo pastry	Similar to baklava but filled with sweet cream and nuts
Supangle		Cake, pudding	Chocolate pudding topped cake garnished with chopped pistachio or shredded coconut
Süngeriye		Dairy	A fluffy dessert made with egg whites, milk, rice flour and sugar.
Süt helvası		Pudding, dairy	Dessert consists of milk, butter, flour and sugar
Sütlaç		Pudding, dairy	It is a dessert made using rice, milk and sugar.
Sütlü nuriye		Phyllo pastry, dairy	Baklava variation with dairy milk
Taş kadayıf		Fried dough dessert	Dough filled with walnut or pistachio with crispy exterior and soft interior
Tavuk göğsü		Pudding, dairy	Turkish milk pudding made with fine strands of chicken breast
Tulumba		Fried dough dessert	Deep-fried batter dough soaked in sharbat syrup
Unutmabeni tatlısı		Pastry	Made with bread, pekmez and sugar.
Yassı kadayıf		Fried dough dessert	Fried round shaped dough sweetened with sharbat syrup. Generally served with walnut.
Van pastası		Cake	Kind of cake.
Yanıksı Dondurma		Ice cream	Type of ice cream specific to Antalya. Its distinguishing feature is its smoky taste, caused by the burning of goat milk during production.
Zerde		Pudding	Sweet rice pudding colored yellow with saffron
Zini hamursuzu		Pastry	Kind of pastry with poppy seed and tahini.

== See also ==
- Outline of kadayif
- List of desserts
- Turkish cuisine
