= Bursa cuisine =

Bursa cuisine may refer to:

- Ayva tatlısı
- İskender kebap
- Kemal Pasha dessert
