= Tklapi =

Traditional Georgian puréed fruit roll-up leather

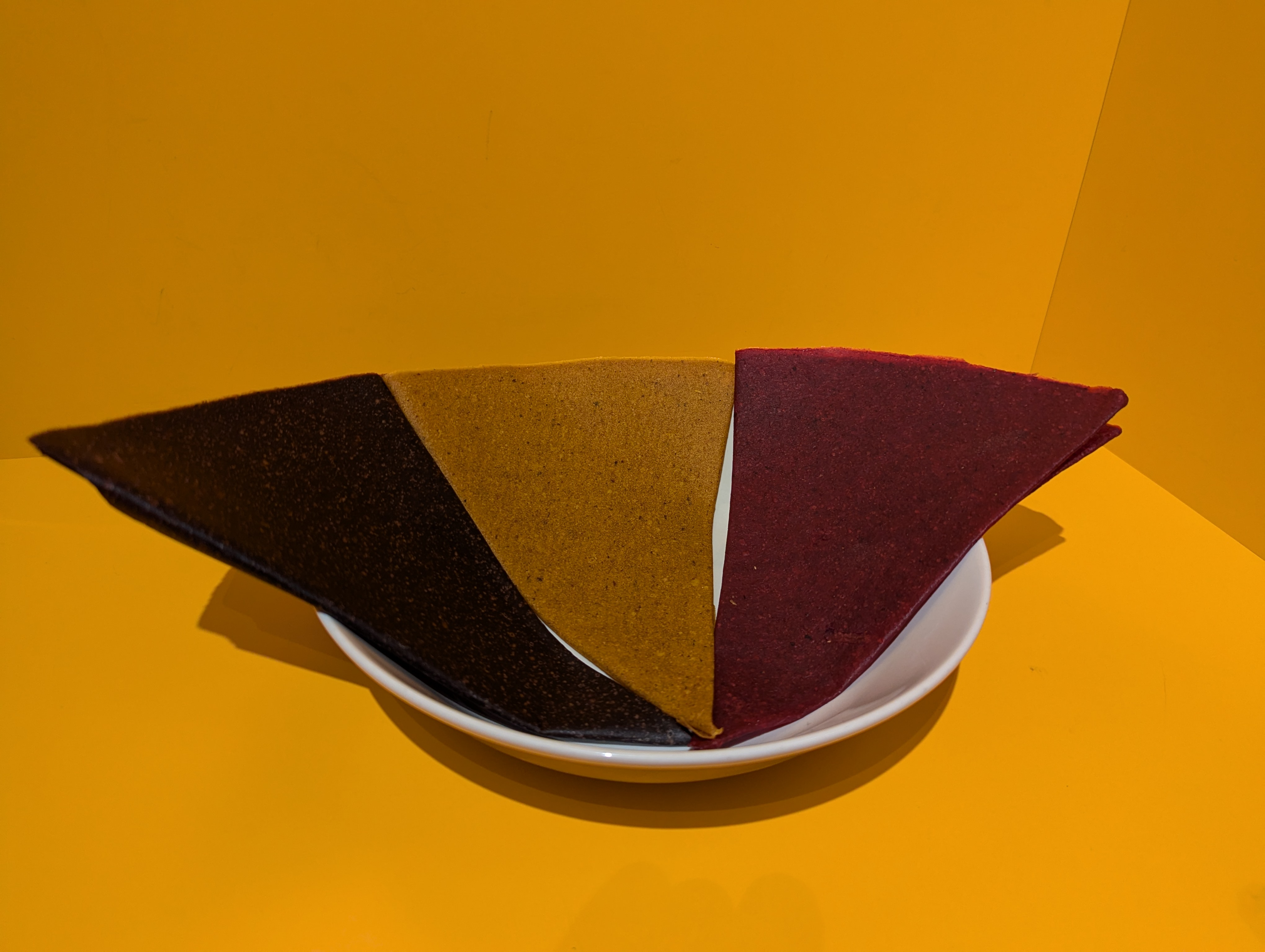
- Various flavors of Tklapi from Dezerter Bazaar (Tbilisi, Georgia)
- Place of origin: Georgia

Tklapi (Georgian: ტყლაპი) is a traditional Georgian puréed fruit roll-up leather. It is spread thinly onto a sheet and sun-dried on a clothesline. It can be sour or sweet. The sour version is made of cherry plums, which are often used for soups and stews, mostly with Kharcho. Sweet Tklapi is made of apricots or peaches. It can also be prepared by the juice that is used in making Churchkhela.

== See also ==
- Churchkhela
- Kaysefe
- Orcik candy
- Pastila
- Fruit Roll-Ups
- Pestil
