= Kalburabastı =

Turkish dessert

Hurma, Kalburabastı
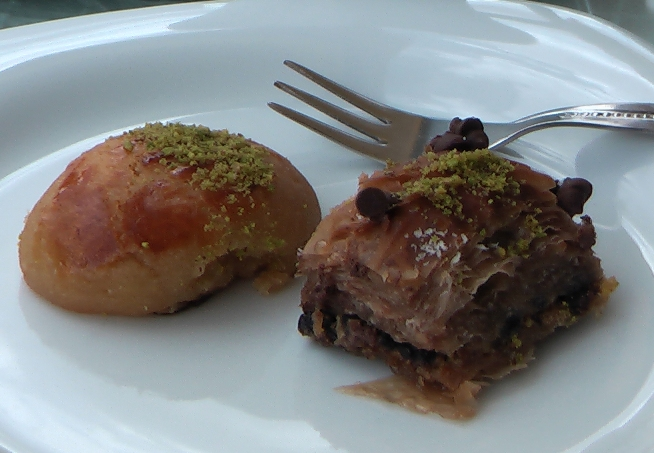
- Course: Dessert
- Place of origin: Turkey
- Main ingredients: Flour, oil, syrup, nuts

Kalburabastı (sometimes spelled kalbura bastı) or kalburabasma (Turkish, also known as hurmašice in Bosnia and Herzegovina, and throughout the rest of former Yugoslavia as urmašice), and sometimes also known under the name of hurma, are syrup-drenched pastries that have a riddled appearance. They are featured among the favorite specialities that are prepared during the Islamic holidays, including the three-day Eid al-Fitr (called Şeker Bayramı or "Candy Feast" in Turkish language) and Eid al-Adha.

This Ottoman Turkish treat has a very similar variation of it ("hurmašice") which can be found in Bosnia and Herzegovina, and other parts of former Yugoslavia.

== See also ==
- Melomakarono
- Şekerpare
- Revani
- Baklava
- Tulumba
- Loukoumades
- Phoenicia dessert
- List of pastries
