= Kemal Pasha (disambiguation) =

Kemal Pasha usually refers to Mustafa Kemal Atatürk (1881–1938), founder of the Republic of Turkey

Kemal Pasha may also refer to:

- Kemalpaşa, a town and district in İzmir Province, Turkey
- Kemalpaşa, Artvin, a town and district in Artvin Province, Turkey
- Kemal Pasha dessert
- Mustafakemalpaşa, a town and district in Bursa Province, Turkey
