= Tavuk =

Tavuk may refer to:

- Tavuk şiş, chicken shish kebab
- Tavuk göğsü Turkish shredded chicken milk pudding
