= Pestil =

Dried fruit dessert

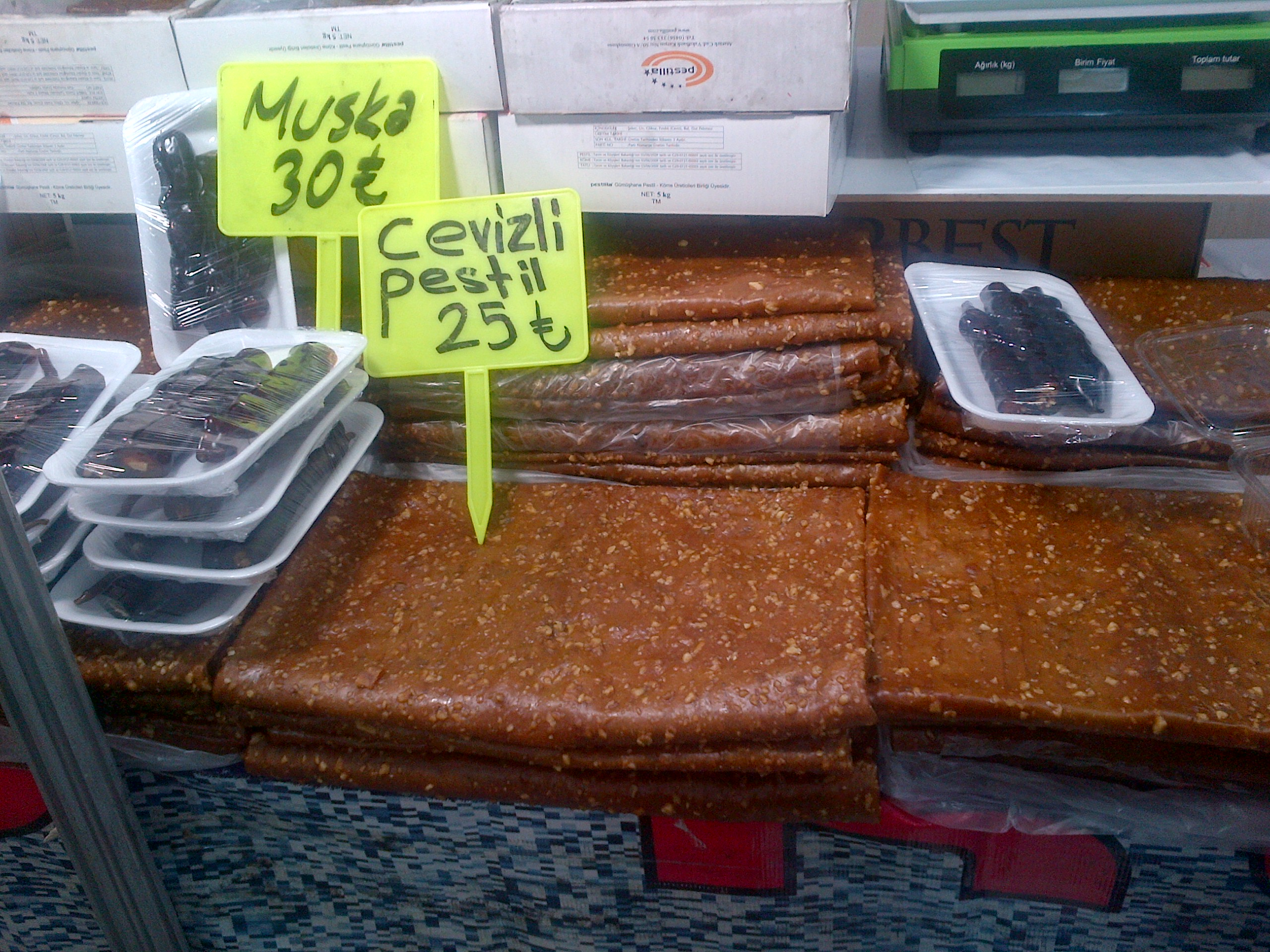
- Place of origin: Armenia
- Associated cuisine: Armenian cuisine Turkish cuisine
- Main ingredients: must, nuts, flour or starch

Pestil is a traditional dried fruit pulp that is commonly produced in West Asia. It is known under different names such as bastegh or pastegh (Armenian: պաստեղ), t'tu lavash (Armenian: թթու լավաշ, lit. 'sour lavash'), bestil, and fruit leather.

Fruit leather is made from mechanically pulverizing fruit, then spreading it out to dry into a tough, yet flexible and edible material which can be kept preserved for several months in an airtight container. It is a popular dessert in Armenia and Turkey.

Pestil might be made with different types of fruit beside plums. Pomegranates, grapes, apples, apricots, pears, peaches and watermelons are popular choices.

== Etymology and history ==
According to Robert Dankoff, the term bastik, used in much of Anatolia including Bursa, Kayseri, and Van, derives from Armenian pasteł (պաստեղ, "pastegh" / "fruit leather") which in turn derives from Ancient Greek pastillos (πάστιλλος, "pastille"). This word and the fruit leather it describes was first attested in Middle Armenian as պաստեղ (pasteġ) in the year 1227 AD.

A similar confection called malban has existed in the medieval Middle East; 14th-century traveller Ibn Battuta described malban in his travelogue titled The Travels of Ibn Battuta, malban was made in Damascus from grape syrup thickened with a powder with nuts embedded in it.

According to Turkish-Armenian linguist Nişanyan Sevan, pestil and pastillo are cognates and pastillo might have derived from Italian pastello. The dictionary asserts that the relationship between pestil and French pastille is ambiguous. The first Turkish attestation of the word is dated back to 1501 dictionary Câmiü'l-Fürs. According to historian Priscilla Mary Işın, pestil was known by many names during the Ottoman period, including bastik and besdil, it was being imported in large quantities by the imperial palace. There exists an Ottoman recipe for quince pestil dated to 1891.

The origins of pastegh may be traced back to the times when Armenia was part of the Achaemenid Empire as the Satrapy of Armenia.

Pestil is known as malban (Arabic: ملبن) in Arabic.

== Preparation ==
Production begins with fruit juice which is cooked with starch or wheat flour to thicken into a gel consistency. Depending on the desired flavour and texture, additional ingredients such as sugar, honey, lemon juice or other flavourings may also be incorporated. The resulting mixture is spread evenly over a flat surface in a thin layer and dried, traditionally under direct sunlight or, in modern production, using hot-air drying equipment. During drying, moisture is removed and the mixture develops its characteristic flexible, leather-like texture. Once sufficiently dried, the pestil is separated from the drying surface, cut into suitable portions and prepared for packaging and storage.

Traditional preparation of pestil

Boiling of the fruit mixture

Spreading the mixture for drying

The fruit mixture is sun-dried

The finished dried pestil is removed from the drying surface

The finished pestil is packaged

== Regional varieties ==
=== Turkey ===
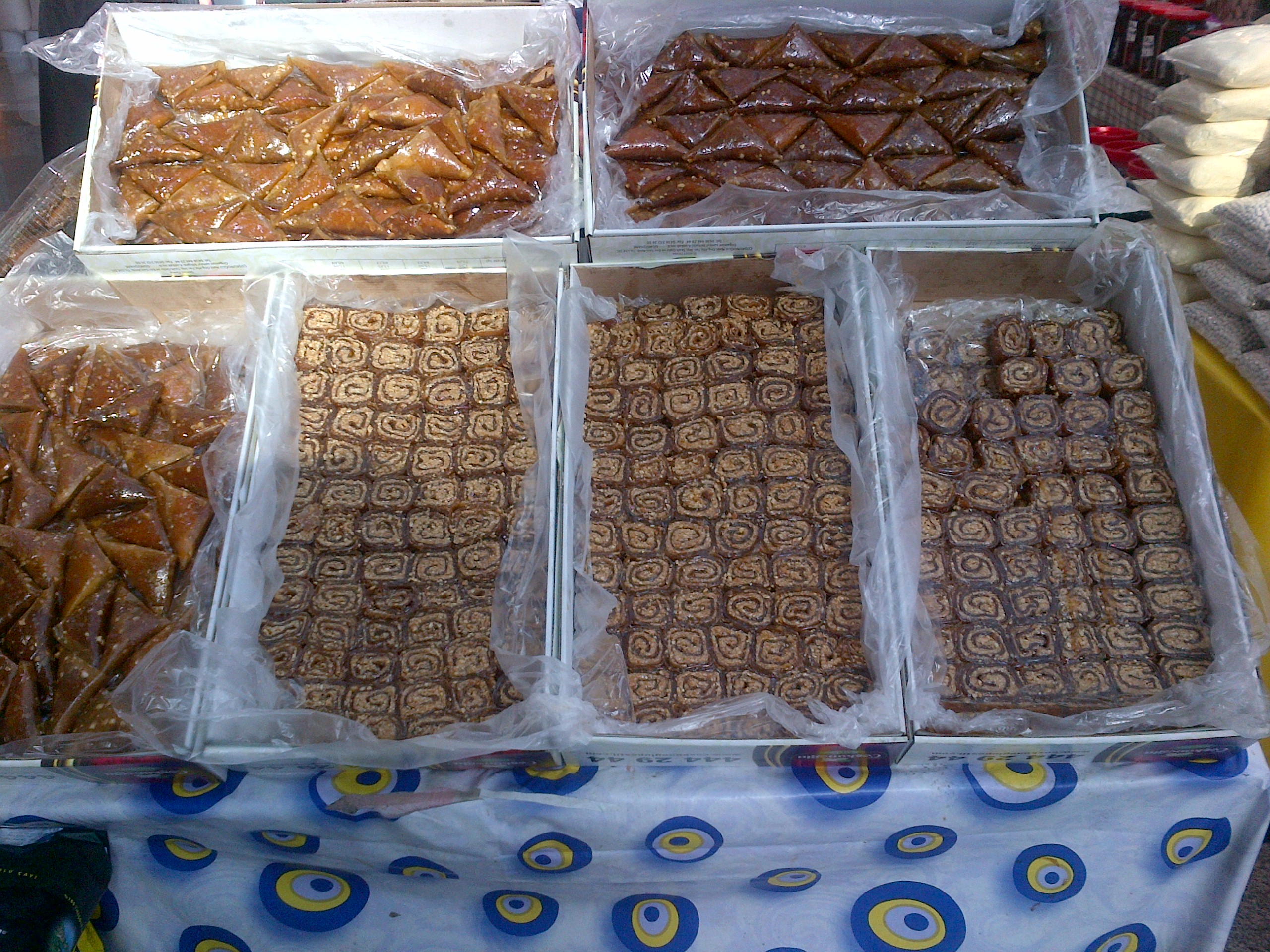
Turkish pestil rolled around a walnut filing, alongside the triangular muska at the top

In Turkey, pestil is commonly made using mulberry or grape juice, and it often incorporates walnuts or hazelnuts into the mixture. Pestil is also commonly rolled around a filling of walnuts. Muska pestil are confections made by wrapping pestil around a walnut filling into a triangular shape.

=== Armenia ===
To make Armenian pastegh, apricots, sour cherries, plums, peaches, grapes, pomegranates, or other fruits are pressed, and the juice is boiled with sugar and thickened with flour or cornstarch. This mixture is then spread evenly over heavy muslin sheets, about 1/8 inch thick, and left to dry overnight. The following day, the sheets are hung outdoors to finish drying. Once the fruit puree has dried, it is sprayed with water to facilitate easy removal from the muslin.

=== Levant ===
A version of pestil called malban (Arabic: ملبن) is prepared in the Levant region, it is made by boiling grape juice, semolina flour is added to the boiling grape juice, and finally nigella seeds are added to the mix, the resulting mix is shaped into a sheet of fruit leather.

Malban is especially popular in the cities of Hebron and Homs, Hebron in particular produces large amounts of grapes annually, some of which are turned into malban if fresh grapes remain unsold. It is attested as early as 1923 in Palestinian folk songs according to ethnographer Tawfiq Canaan.

== Gallery ==
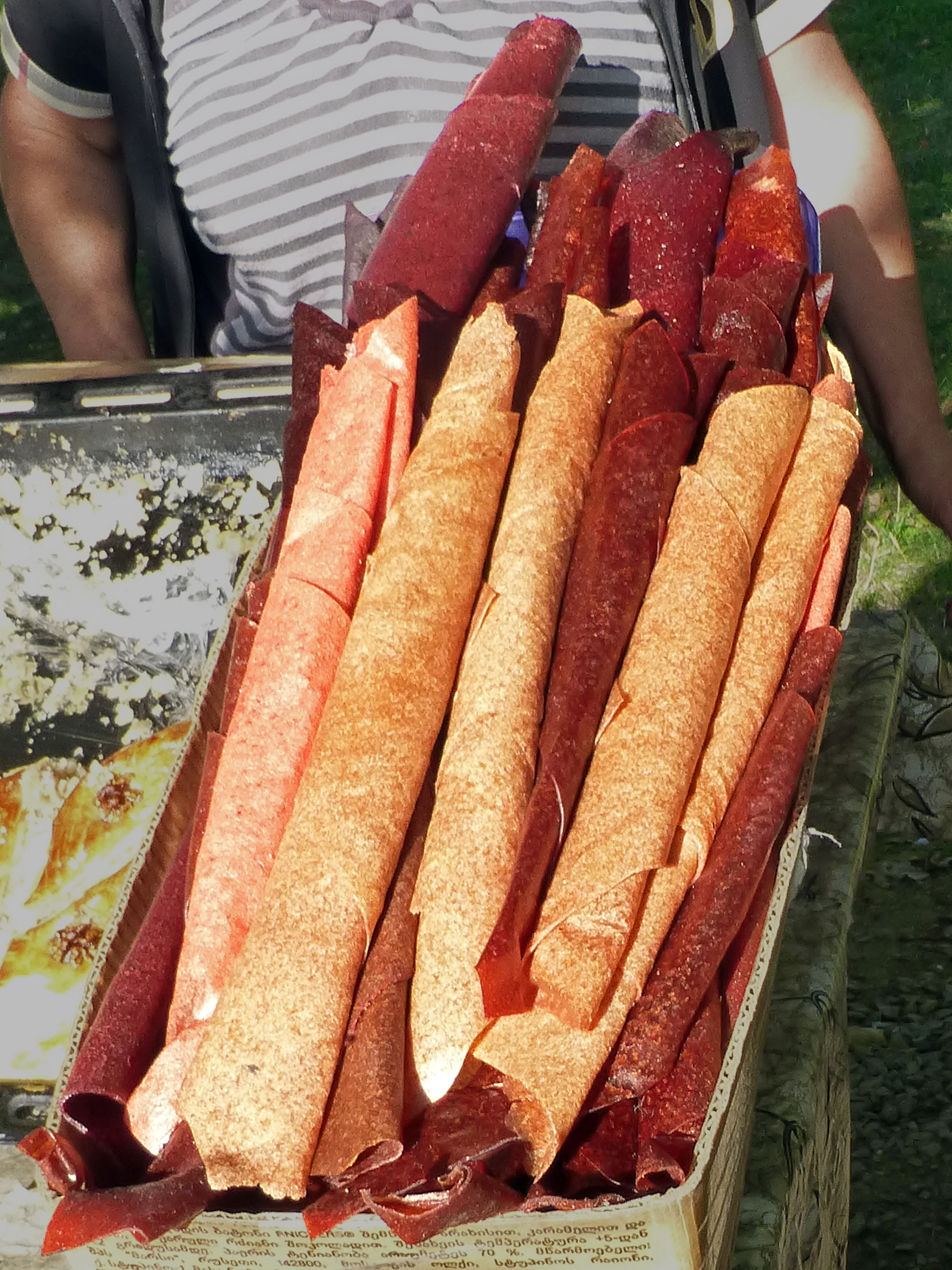
Armenian pastegh

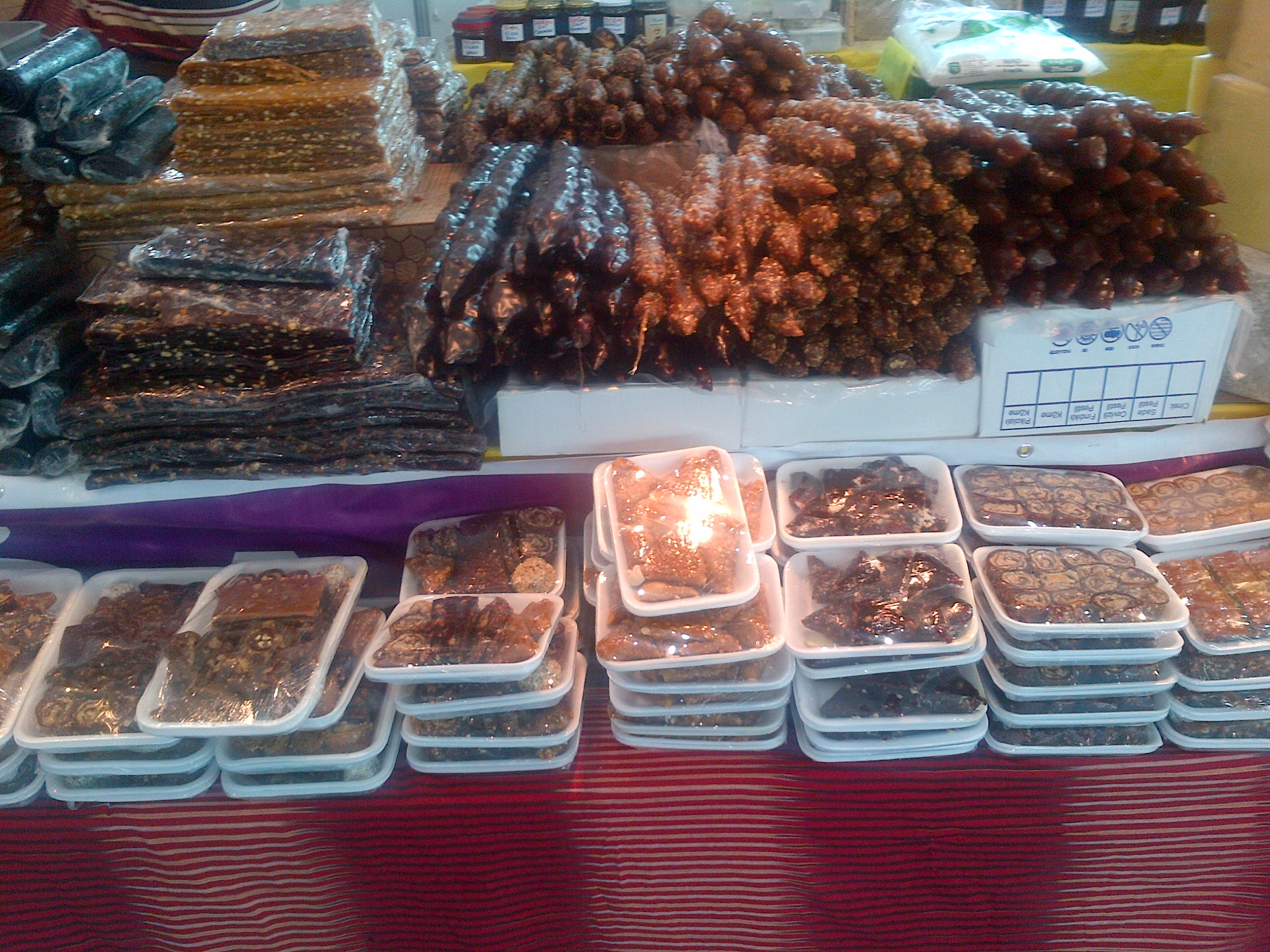
Pestil in Turkey (upper left)

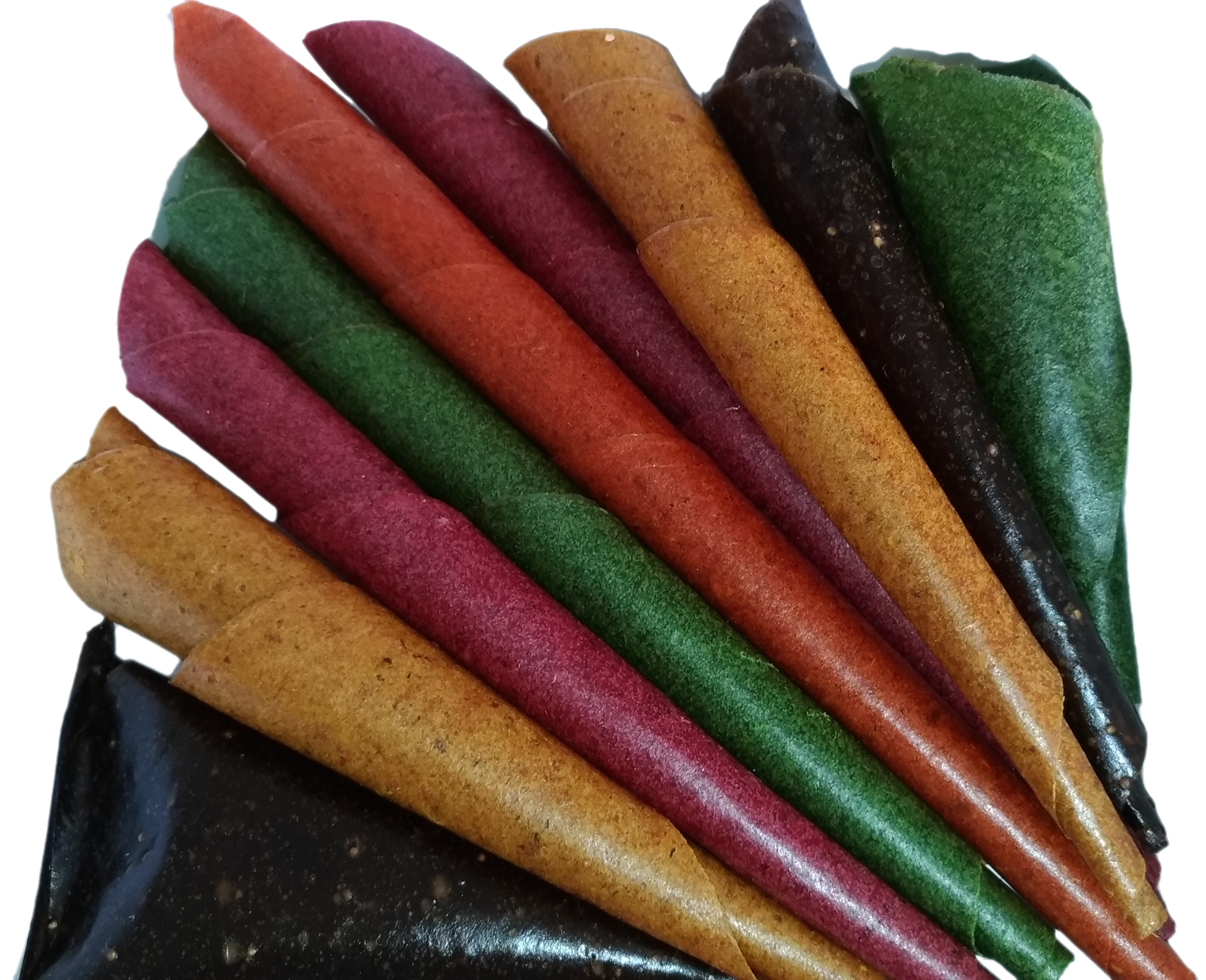
Armenian rolled up pastegh

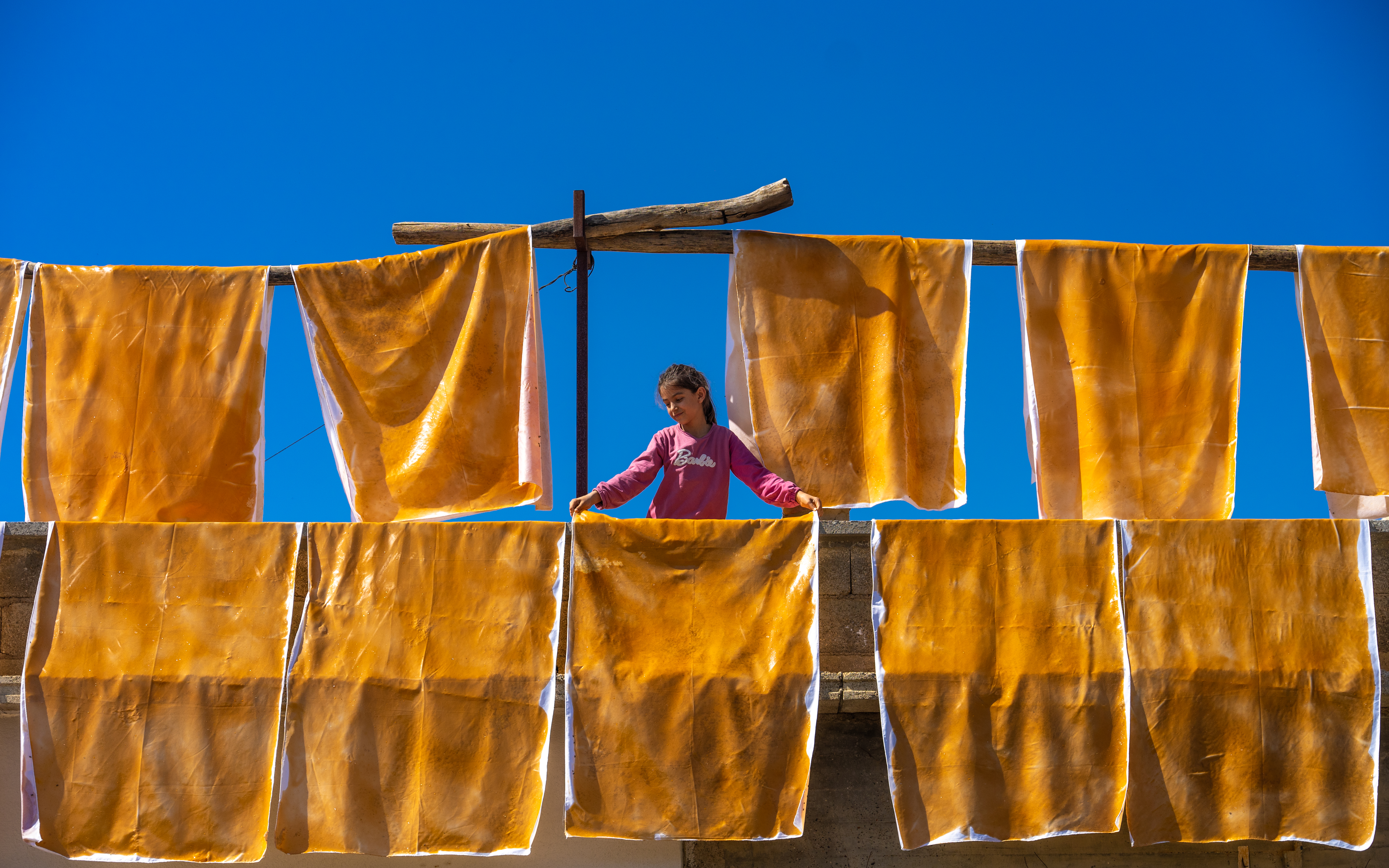
Preparation of pestil in Turkey

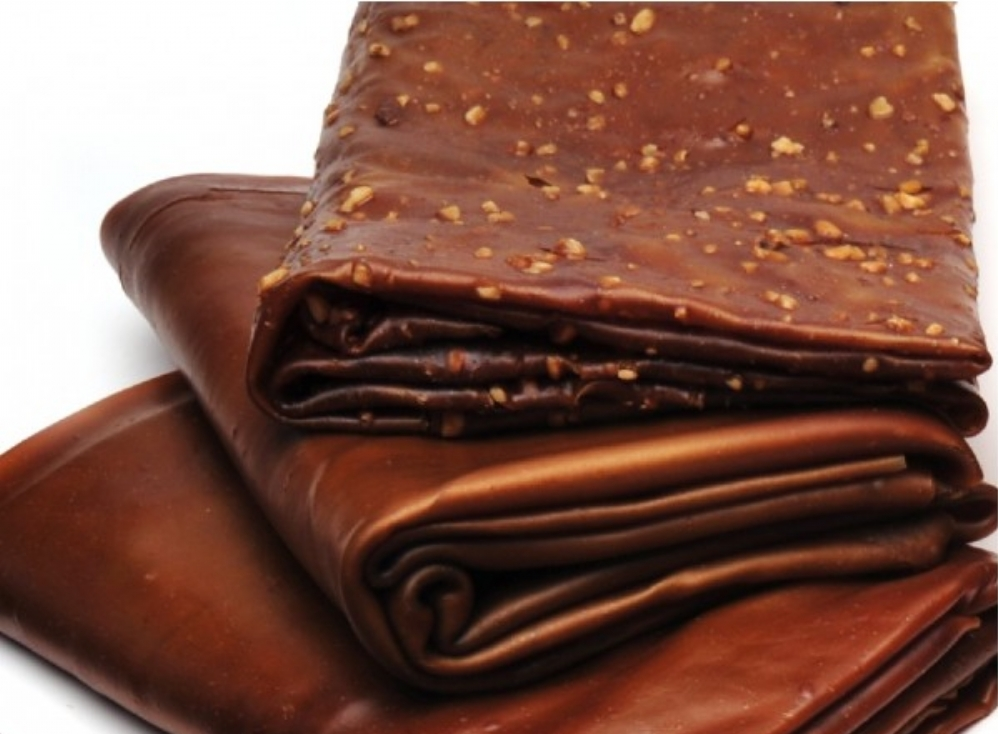
Turkish pestil, with and without walnuts

== See also ==
- Churchkhela
- Kaysefe
- Orcik candy
- Pastila
- Fruit Roll-Ups
- Tklapi
- Lavashak
- Pelamushi
