= Bağaça =

Type of Turkish donut

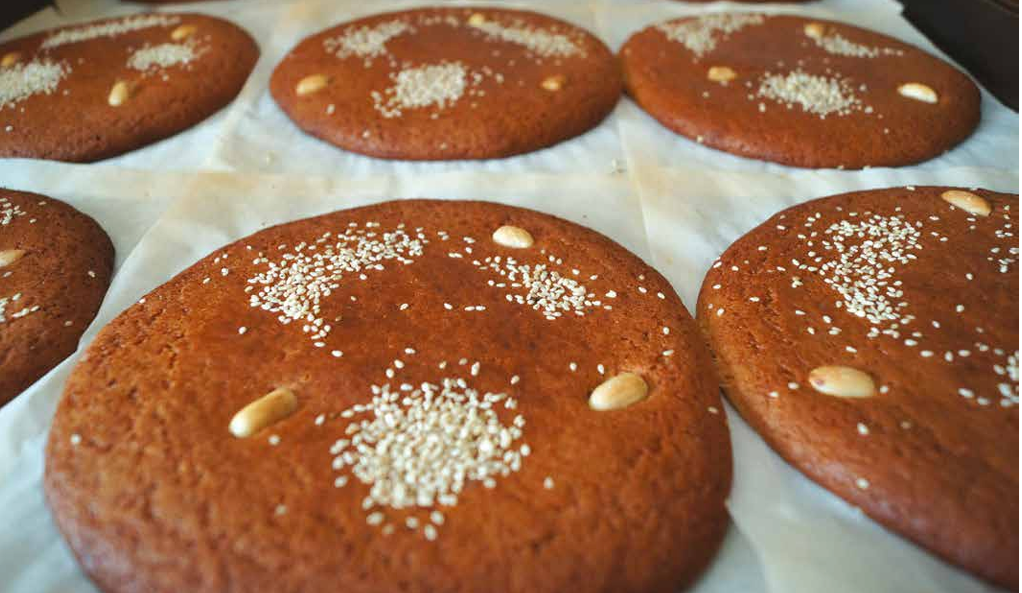
- Type: Tsoureki
- Place of origin: Turkey
- Created by: Mustafa Zünbül
- Invented: 1940s
- Main ingredients: Tahini, Mastic, Chickpea Yeast, Cinnamon, milk, flour, butter, sugar
- Ingredients generally used: Peanut, Sesame Seeds, Almond

Bağaça is a unique, traditional pastry exclusive to the Antalya region, deeply associated with the holy month of Ramadan. While it might look like a large, flat bun or a dense, sweet cake, its texture and flavor profile are entirely in a league of their own.

A person who cooks this cake is called a “Bağaçacı” in Turkish. The art of making Bağaça is a traditional profession, with knowledge passed from master to apprentice, from generation to generation.

The ingredients in Bağaça are flour, butter, sugar, tahini, sesame seeds, mastic, chickpea yeast, and cinnamon. Chickpea yeast is the ultimate secret behind Bağaça. This special, naturally fermented yeast is what makes the pastry incredibly soft, fluffy, and very easy on the digestive system. Pine mastic and cinnamon are responsible for the famous, mouth-watering aroma that fills the bakery streets as the Bağaça comes out of the wood-fired oven. Tahini and butter give the dough its rich, dense flavor, high nutritional value, and its remarkable ability to keep you full for hours. Bağaça is also generously topped with sesame seeds and peanuts (or sometimes almonds/walnuts) to add a roasted crunch.

Preparation: Broken soaked chickpeas left to stand for a half day in a bowl. When the yeast is ready; yeast, water and flour get mixed. Then added into enough amount tahini, butter, mastic, cinnamon and sugar to the dough. After the dough rested for a while divided into pieces and weighted. Pieces shaped as circles with hand on a marble countertops then placed in a tray which called as pan with wax paper. Bağaças get raised with butter again and decorated with peanuts, almonds and sesames. Cooked for 10 in the brick oven which preheated with wood fire then left to rest. After cooling Bağaças ready to packed and sold.

When you say Bağaça in Antalya, the most famous and historical name that comes to mind is "18'in Bağaçası" (The Bağaça of 18). Developed in the 1940s by an Antalya baker named Mustafa Zünbül, this legendary recipe takes its name from the master baker's primary school collar number, which was "18." The original recipe and baking techniques have been carefully guarded and passed down from father to son for generations, keeping its authenticity alive to this day. Today the most important representatives of Bağaça is Zünbül family. İdris and Mustafa (Father and son also master and apprentice). This business has been working for three generations.

== See also ==
- List of Turkish desserts
