= Kazandibi =

Turkish caramelized milk pudding

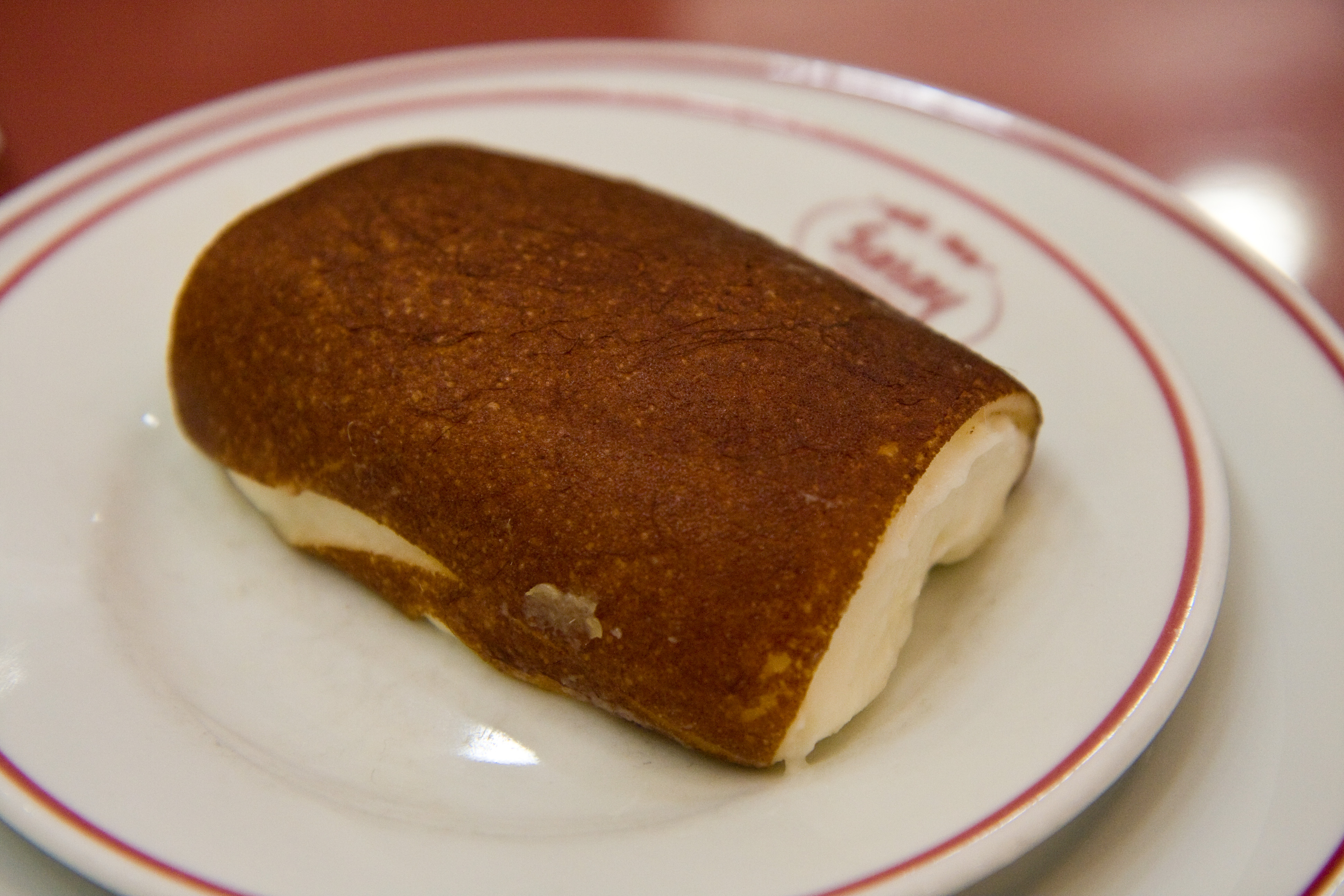
Kazandibi

Kazandibi or kazan dibi (Turkish: Kazandibi, lit. 'bottom of kazan or cauldron') is a Turkish dessert and a type of caramelized milk pudding. It was developed in the kitchens of the Ottoman Palace and is one of the most popular Turkish desserts today.

It is traditionally made by burning the bottom of tavuk göğsü. A variant of kazandibi uses muhallebi instead.

The traditional ingredients include chicken, which was used as a thickener.

== See also ==
- List of Turkish desserts
- Trileçe
- Creme caramel
- Crème brûlée
