= Cheese dessert of Biga =

Turkish dessert

Cheese dessert of Biga Biga peynir tatlısı
- Course: Dessert
- Place of origin: Biga, Çanakkale
- Region or state: Turkey
- Serving temperature: Hot, cold, or room temp
- Main ingredients: Unsalted cheese, dough of flour, egg, water and baking powder
- Variations: Kemalpaşa tatlısı

Cheese dessert of Biga (Turkish: Biga peynir tatlısı) is a Turkish dessert dish. It originates from the district of Biga, Çanakkale Province in Turkey.

== Overview ==
Along with the prevalence of animal husbandry, dairy farming, which includes milk and dairy products, has also developed. Biga is also famous for its cheese and local delicacies using cheese. Among these delicacies, cheese dessert is especially loved by local people and visitors.

The fact that Greeks lived in the region for a long time suggests that this dessert passed into the local culture from Greek cuisine. According to another common rumor, cheese dessert is a homemade dessert that has been made in Biga for centuries. It has survived to this day with recipes and techniques passed down from generation to generation among the local people. Although there is no exact information about the origin of this dessert, it is known that it has an important place in the history and culture of Biga.

== Recipe ==
Traditionally, the Cheese dessert of Biga is made using curd (Turkish: teleme), a cheese variety that is particular to the region. The dessert is prepared from unsalted cheese, a dough of flour, egg, water and baking powder. The dough mixture is formed into small balls of hemispherical shape that are baked until golden brown. The semi-finished product, which has a taste of fresh cheese, is sweetened in hot syrup made of water, sugar and lemon juice. It is ensured that it cools down and absorbs the syrup thoroughly. It is requested that the cheese dessert does not break after being syruped. Optionally, the dessert can be servedwarm or cold with clotted cream or ice cream.

== Geographical indication ==
Biga cheese dessert is a flavor that stands out in the Biga district as both a historical and cultural value. It is appreciated by everyone with its local recipe, unique texture and special taste. While this unique dessert respects the history and heritage of the region, it continues to exist as a flavor passed on to future generations.

In 2023, the Cheese dessert of Biga was registered with a sign of origin as Geographical indication.

== See also ==
- List of Turkish desserts
