= Supangle =

Turkish chocolate pudding

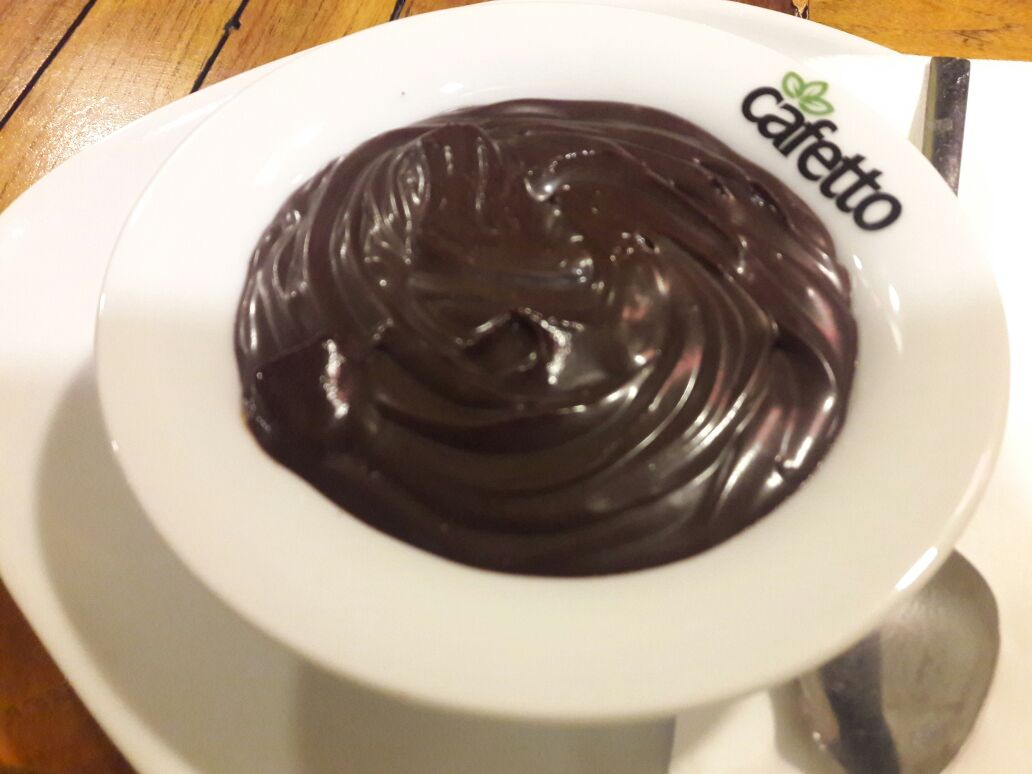
Chocolate pudding

Supangle, or simply sup, is a type of Turkish chocolate pudding. Its bottom layer includes pieces of cake and it is often garnished with pistachio or coconut, and chocolate chips.

== Etymology ==
The name supangle comes from soupe anglaise, French for 'English soup'. It can be thought to be the literal translation of the name of the Italian dessert zuppa inglese, but zuppa inglese is known by its Italian name in France and the name soupe anglaise is not used. While very similar in the inclusion of a dry pastry (cake, biscuits or cookies) and softening it through pudding or custard; compared to zuppa inglese where the biscuits are soaked in liquor there is no alcohol in supangle.

== Preparation ==
Supangle is cooked from milk, sugar, flour, and cocoa powder, with butter and chocolate added. The bottom layer of supangle consists of cake, cookie, or biscuits, for which leftovers may be used. Eggs and hazelnut chocolate spread (e.g. Nutella) are also used in some recipes. It is decorated with ground pistachio or shredded coconut and served cold. Serving it with ice cream is also growing in popularity.

== See also ==
- List of Turkish desserts
- List of puddings
