= Cezerye =

Semi-gelatinous Turkish sweet made from caramelised carrots

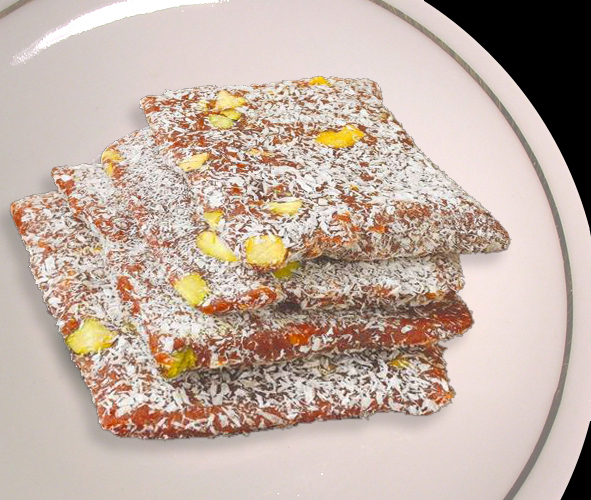
- Type: Confectionery
- Place of origin: Turkey
- Region or state: Mersin
- Main ingredients: Carrots, nuts or pistachios, coconut

Cezerye is a semi-gelatinous traditional Turkish dessert made from caramelised carrots, shredded coconut, and roasted walnuts, hazelnuts, or pistachios. Cut into matchbox-sized rectangular chips, it is traditionally served on special occasions. It originates from the Turkish province of Mersin. The preparation involves boiling and then roasting grated carrots with sugar before adding coconut and nuts.

While variations on the treat exist which replace the carrot with fig or date purée, the name is nonetheless derived from the word "jazriyya", which is Arabic for "with carrot". In Latakia, Syria, jazariyya is made by caramelizing carrots, then pressing them and garnishing them with coconuts, sometimes pumpkins are added in combination with or in place of the carrots.

== See also ==
- List of Turkish desserts
