= Biga, Çanakkale =

Biga
- Municipality
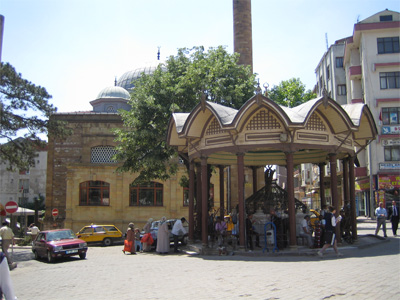
- Central square in Biga

- Location within Turkey Location within Marmara
- Coordinates: 40°13′41″N 27°14′32″E
- Country: Turkey
- Province: Çanakkale
- District: Biga

Government
  - Mayor: Alper Şen (CHP)
- Elevation: 21 m (69 ft)
- Population (2021): 57,125
- Time zone: UTC+3 (TRT)
- Area code: 0286
- Website: www.biga.bel.tr

Biga is a city in Çanakkale Province in the Marmara region of Turkey. It is located on the Biga River, 90 kilometres (56 miles) northeast from Çanakkale city centre. It is the seat of Biga District. Its population is 57,125 (2021). The town lies at an elevation of 21 m (69 ft). The center of COMU Faculty of Economics and Administrative Sciences is in Biga.

== History ==
=== Name ===
Within the area of Biga (at Karabiga) is the site of the ancient city of Pegaea (Greek: Πηγαία), also known as Pegae or Pegai (Πηγαί, "the Springs") until late Byzantine times (in Crusader sources it is also known as Spiga). Archaeologists have not yet established how far back the site has been inhabited. In ancient times, Pegaea, located on the plain of Adrastea on the border between the Troad and Mysia, was sometimes included as part of one and sometimes the other. Since coming under Ottoman rule in 1364 it has been known as Biga. Under the Ottomans, it was the seat of a sanjak.

=== Ecclesiastical history ===
In the early 14th century, Emperor Andronikos II Palaiologos made Pegae a metropolis, by uniting it with Parium, as they both faced decline amid the Turkoman and Ghazi invasions. In 1354 the metropolis of Pegae-Parium was described as being close to disappearing. The incumbent metropolitan received the see of Sozopolis in hopes that it would support the other two economically. However, the metropolis soon disappeared.

== Tourism ==
Among the tourist sites in the district are the Ilıcabashı spa, Parion (Kemer), Priapos (Karabiga castle)

== International relations ==
Biga is twinned with:

- Xanthi, Greece (since 2000)

== See also ==
- Biga Çayı
- Cheese dessert of Biga

== Gallery ==
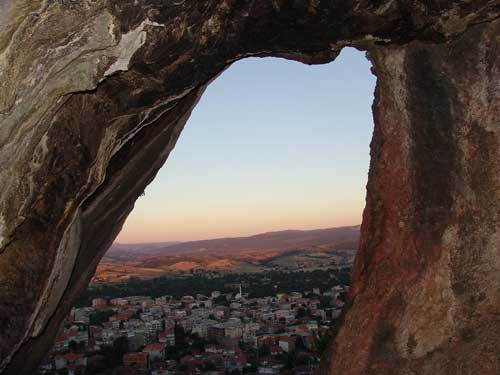
Biga panorama from Balıkkaya

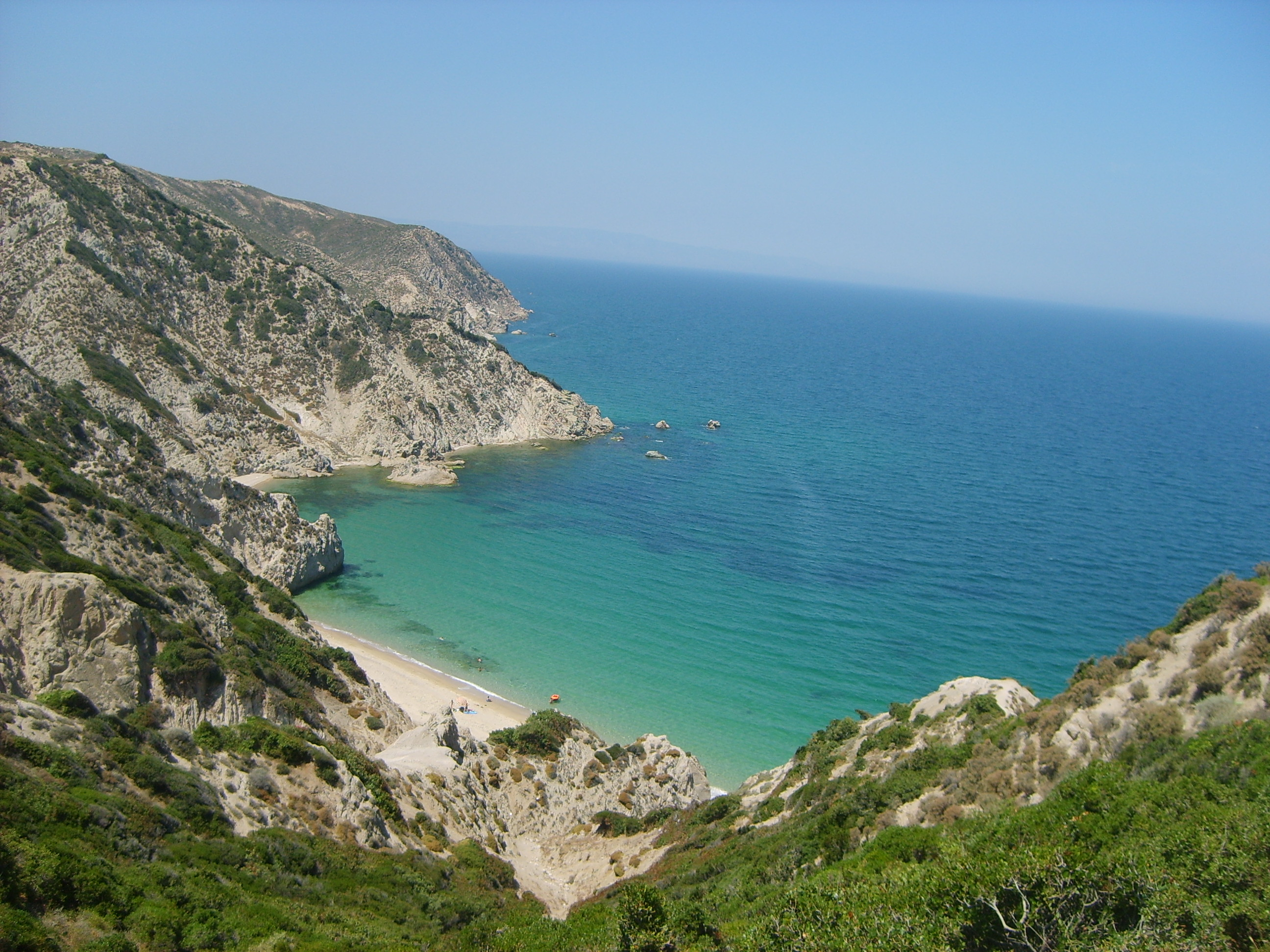
Kocakum shores in Karabiga

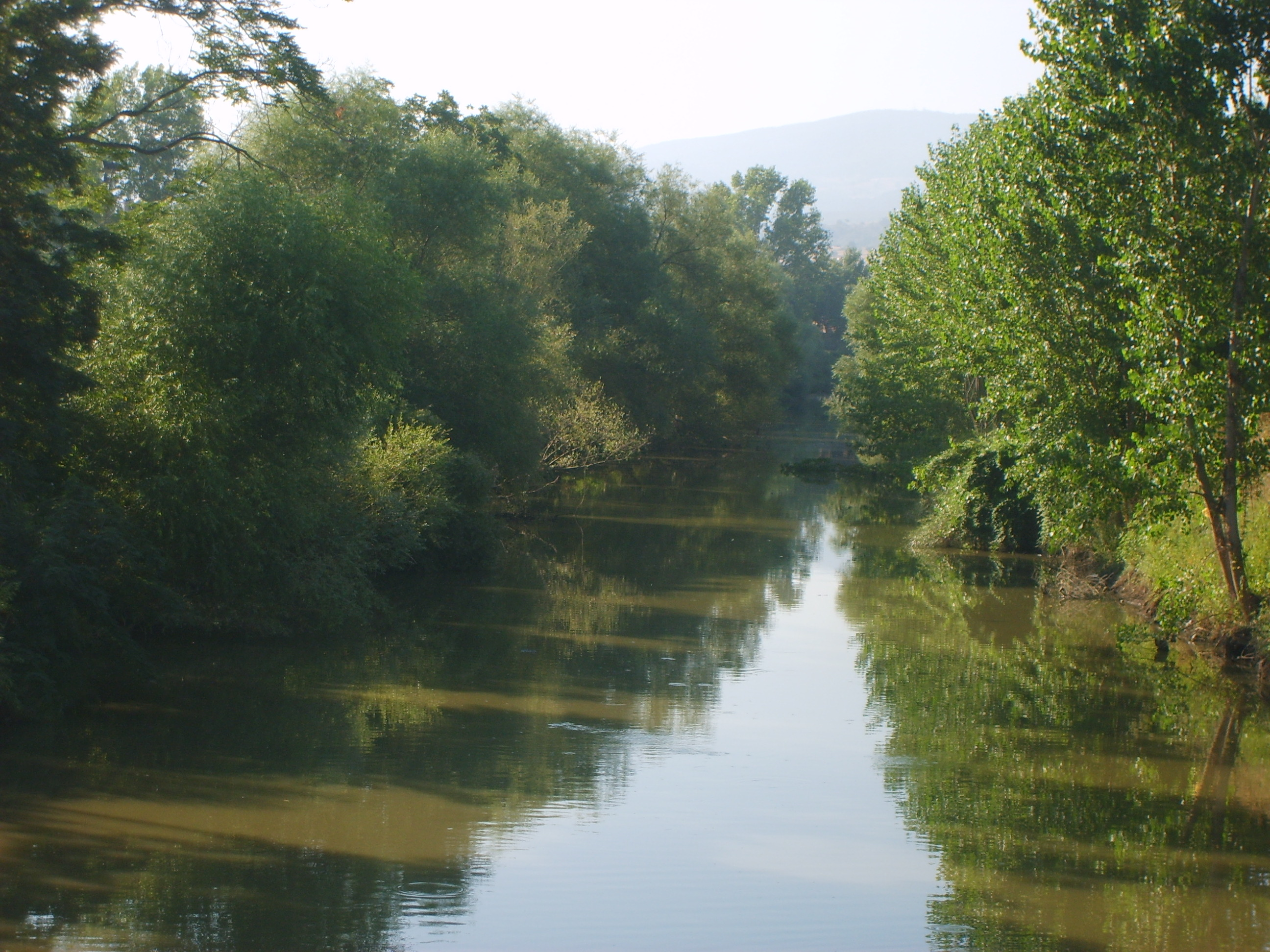
Biga Çayı (Granicus River) in Biga
