= Nevzine tatlısı =

Turkish dessert

Nevzine dessert
- Course: Dessert
- Place of origin: Turkey

Nevzine dessert (Turkish: Nevzine tatlısı) is a Turkish dessert made with tahini, pekmez and walnut. It is a regional specialty of Kayseri province. It is usually served on Ramadan and on holidays.

== Preparation ==
Nevzine tatlısı is made with a leavened dough made of flour, egg, vegetable oil, tahini, milk and a little vinegar to activate the baking soda which acts as a leavening agent. After kneading the dough, crushed walnuts are incorporated before the dough is kneaded a second time. It is baked in the oven on an ungreased tray and optionally garnished with walnuts. To make the molasses syrup a grape molasses called pekmez is heated on the stove with sugar to make a syrup called şerbet. The warm şerbet is poured over the dessert while hot. It takes several hours for the dessert to cool before it is ready to serve.

== See also ==
- List of desserts
