= Şıllık =

Turkish dessert crepe filled with walnuts

Şıllık is a Turkish dessert crepe that is a specialty of the southeastern Urfa province. It is a thin dough made of milk and flour, similar to a crepe, filled with ground walnuts and topped with simple syrup and chopped pistachio. Some versions of the filling may include a mix of walnut and pistachio. Butter or Turkish grape molasses may optionally be added to the simple syrup sauce. Traditionally, lamb tail fat was used to fry the crepes. In Turkish the word şıllık means slut or hussy, so some women in the conservative province of Urfa are not comfortable ordering the dessert by name, preferring instead to allow a male relative to order it for them or simply asking for "that dessert".
