= Keşkül =

Milk and almond pudding

Keşkül Kishk
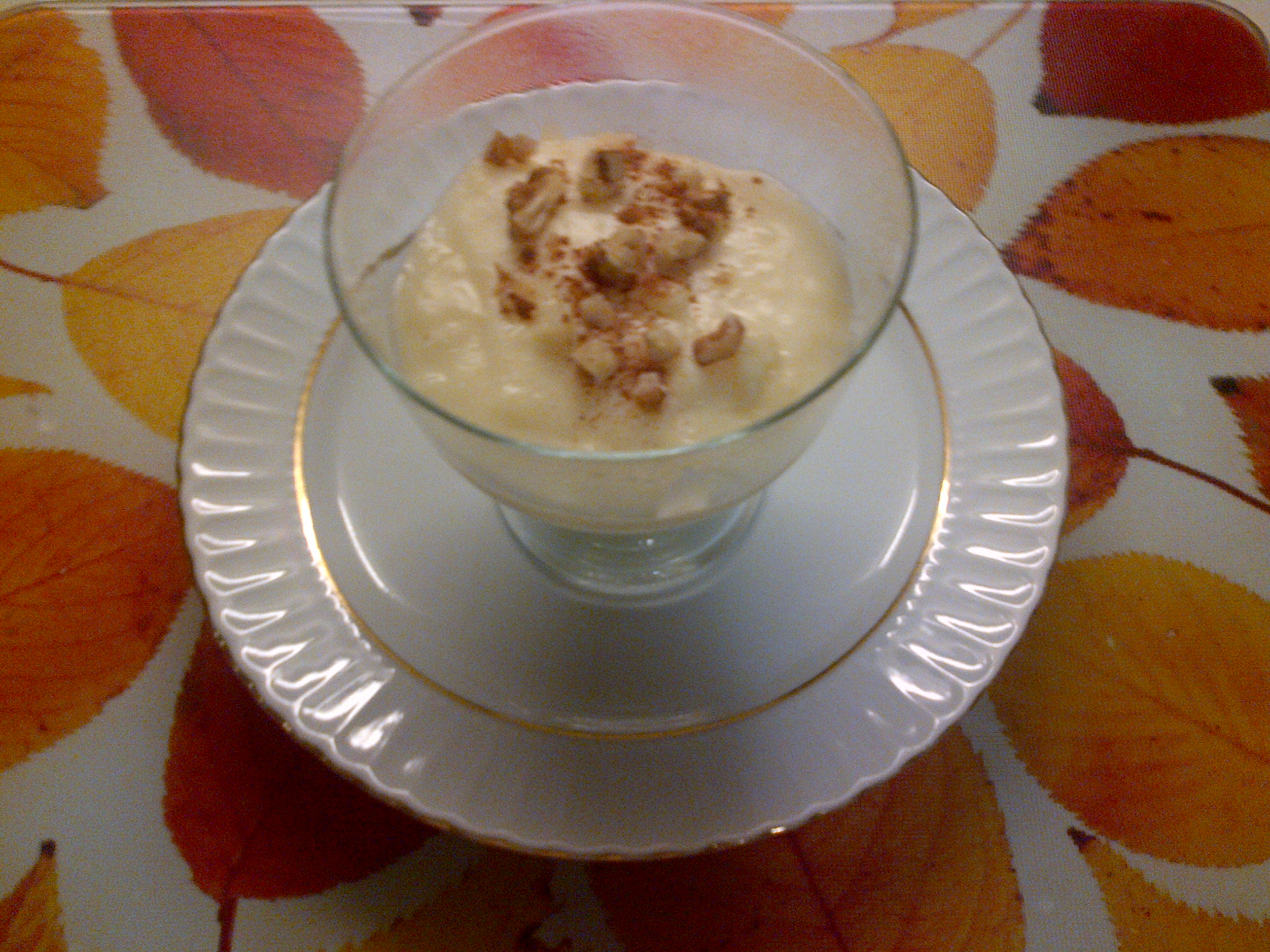
- Turkish keşkül with cracked walnuts on it.
- Type: Pudding
- Main ingredients: Almonds, milk
- Similar dishes: Muhallebi

Keşkül, or Kishk (Arabic: كِشْك) is an almond-based milk pudding found in the Middle East and Afghanistan. Usually served in a bowl and eaten with a spoon, it is often garnished with coconut shaving or pistachio nuts and is off-white in colour. Occasionally, egg yolks, starch can also be added for texture.

== Etymology ==
The dish's name is derived from the Ottoman Turkish idiomatic expression "keşkül-i fukara" meaning "beggar's bowl". The word keşkül and its respective idiom is ultimately traced back to Persian kaşkūl (كشكول), meaning "beggar" or "beggar's bowl". The oldest written usage of the word in a Turkic language is traced backed to Franciscus a Mesgnien Meninski's Thesaurus. According to Meninski the word originally meant poculum or scyphus. The usage of the word to indicate the dessert is first attested in Şemseddin Sami's 1900 work Kamûs-ı Türkî.

== Regional varieties ==
Kishk al-Fuqara' (Arabic: كشك الفقراء, lit. 'poor man's kishk', likely derived from keshkul) is a Syrian variety made with almond milk and whole fat milk flavored with rose water, mastic (plant resin), and salep. In Lebanon, the name refers to a type of cheese.

== See also ==
- Muhallebi
