= Melomakarono =

Greek Christmas dessert

Melomakarona
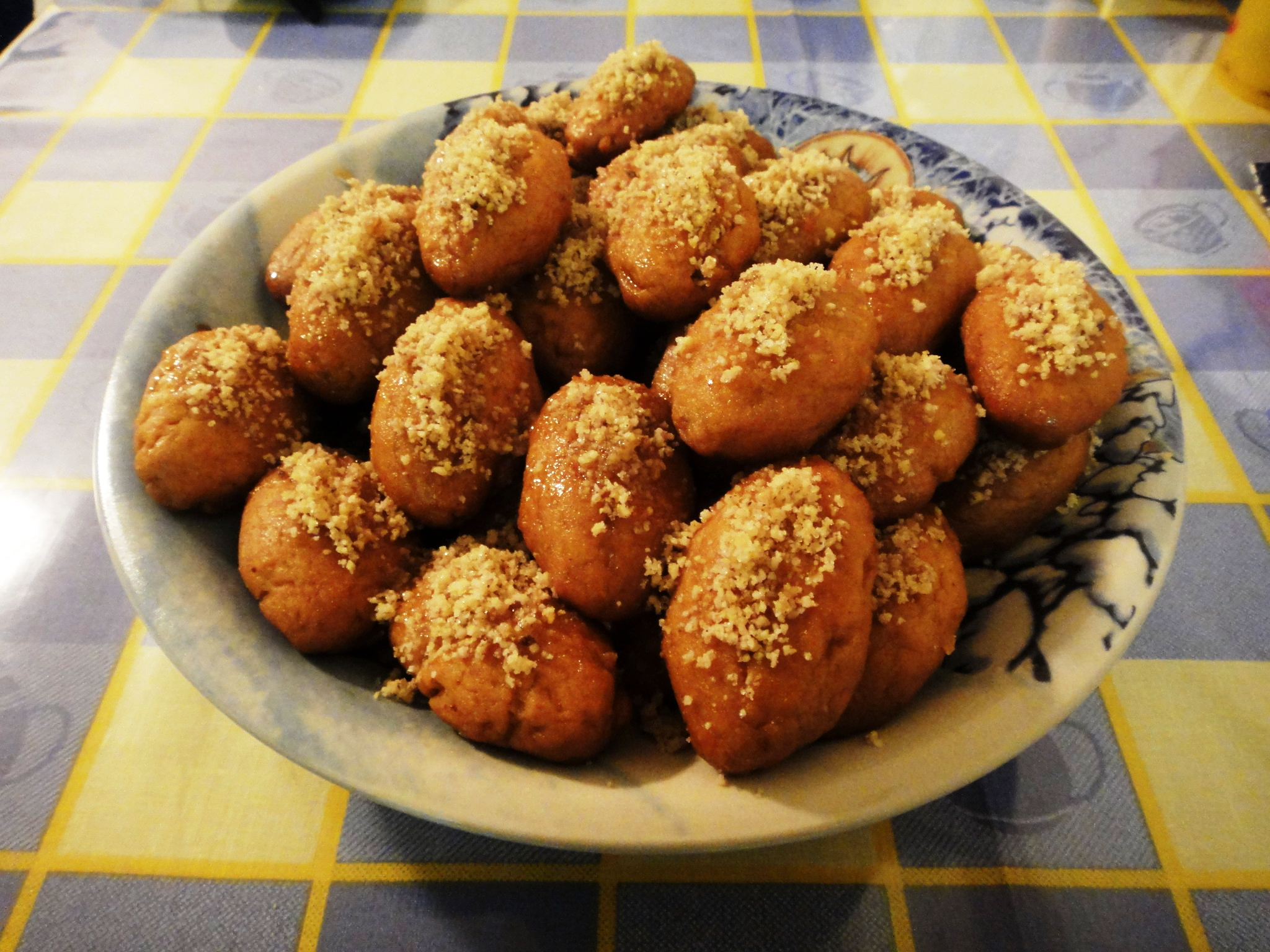
- Course: Dessert
- Place of origin: Greece
- Main ingredients: Semolina, olive oil and honey

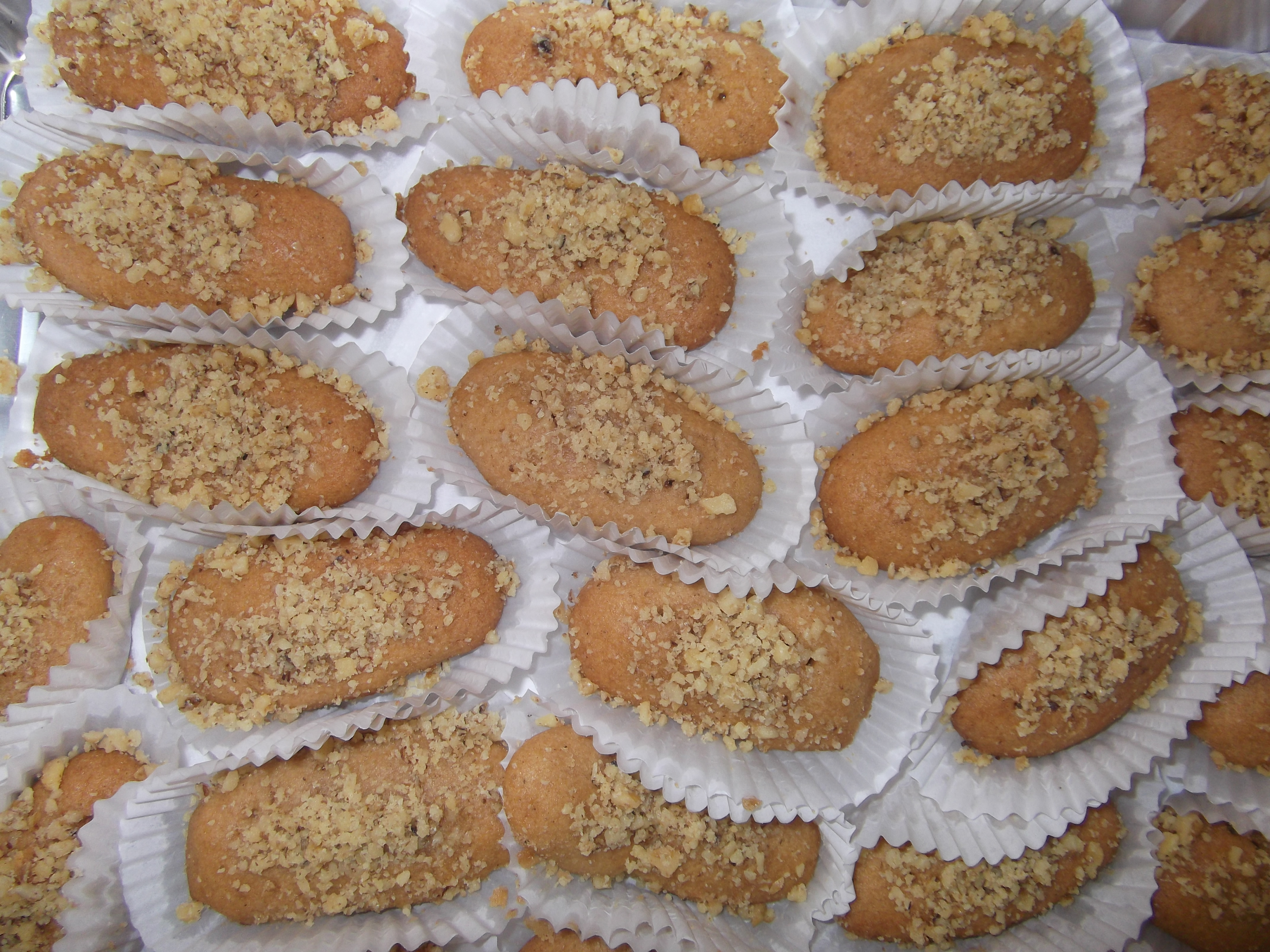
Finikia

The melomakarono (Greek: μελομακάρονο plural: μελομακάρονα, melomakarona) is an egg-shaped Greek dessert made mainly from flour, olive oil, and honey. Along with the kurabiedes, it is a traditional dessert prepared primarily during the Christmas holiday season. They are also known as finikia.

Typical ingredients of the melomakarono are flour or semolina, sugar, orange zest and/or fresh juice, cognac (or similar beverage), cinnamon, crushed or ground clove and olive oil. During rolling they are often filled with ground walnuts. Immediately after baking, they are immersed for a few seconds in cold syrup made of honey and sugar dissolved in water. Finally, they are decorated with ground, as well as bigger pieces of walnut. Dark chocolate-covered melomakarona are also a more recent variation of the traditional recipe.

== Name ==
Melomakarono is a compound of meli, meaning honey, and makaria, an ancient and medieval bread eaten during funerals. Gradual changes in the recipe and the addition of dipping them in honey led to melomakarona which etymologically is derived from the Greek word for honey "meli" and "makaria".

== Origin and history ==
Some allege that melomakarona, also known as finikia, originated in ancient Phoenicia, due to the name and were introduced to Greece as early as 300BC. However, the name finikia seems to have been in use in the Byzantine Empire to describe their "reddish" colour, rather than denoting origin. Others note how melomakarona were served in the first Olympic Games in 776BC, being a favourite of athletes. It was also eaten by the Byzantine Greeks during funerals, as a tribute to the memory of the dead.

== See also ==
- Loukoumades
- Halva
