= Şekerpare =

Turkish dessert

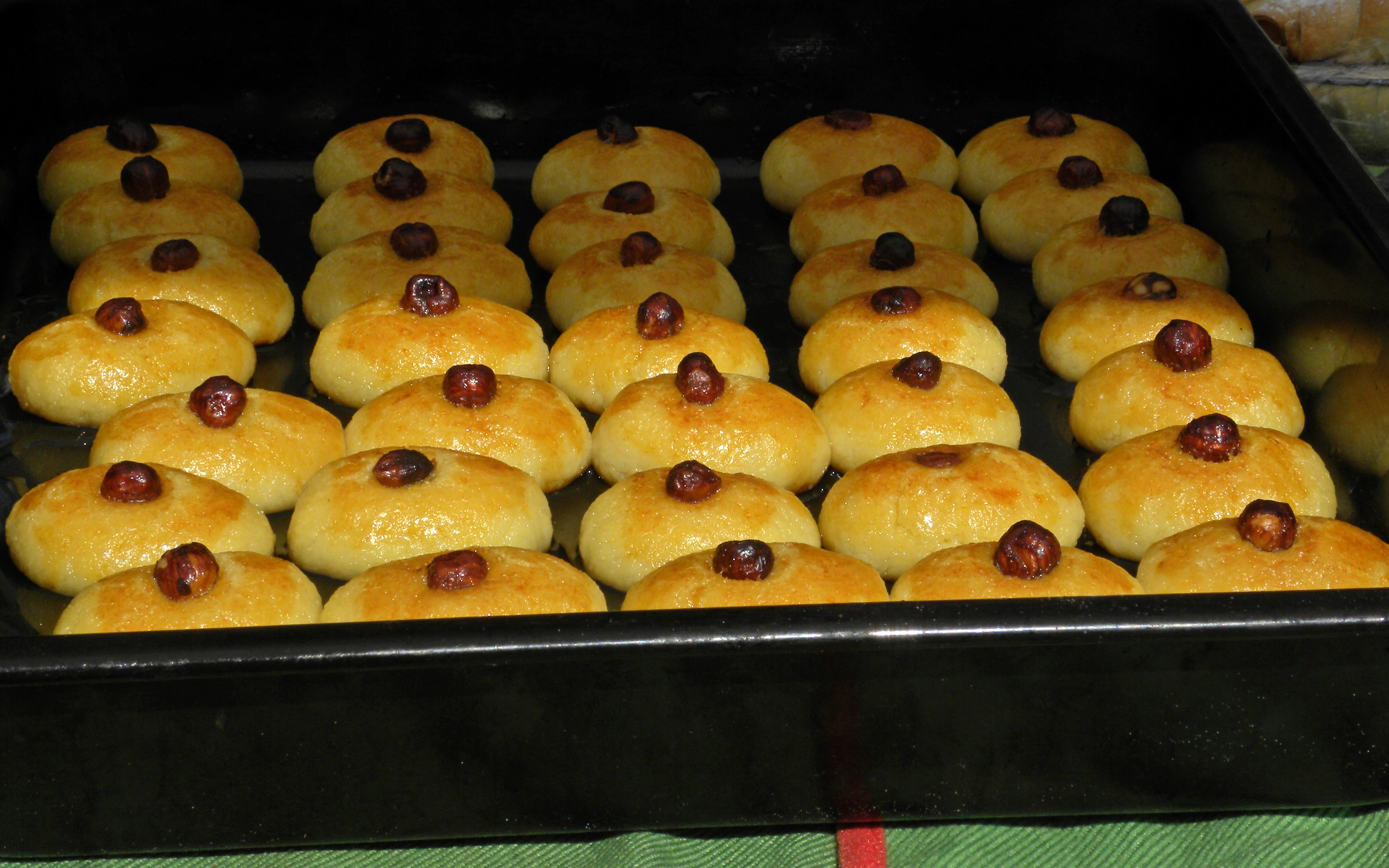
- Course: Dessert
- Place of origin: Turkey
- Main ingredients: Flour, oil, syrup

Şekerpare (lit. 'piece of sugar', pronounced sheh-kehr-PAH-reh) is a common dessert in Turkish cuisine. It is a semolina cookie that is topped with nuts and soaked in sugar syrup. It is most popular during Ramadan.

The dessert is also popular in Egypt and the Levant as rumūsh al-sitt (Arabic: رموش الست, lit. 'lady's eyelashes').

== Etymology ==
The name Ottoman Turkish Şekerpare is a compound word from the Arabic and Persian words for "sweet piece".

== History ==
Şekerpare is mentioned as early as the second half of the 19th century in historical sources as a syrupy dessert similar to modern-day şekerpare, made with butter, flour, and lye water. According to historian Mary Isin, it was a dessert found on the iftar tables of the elite.

== See also ==
- List of Turkish desserts
- Shekerbura
