= Yanıksı Dondurma =

Ice Cream

- Alternative names: Yanık Dondurma
- Type: Dondurma
- Place of origin: Turkey
- Region or state: Antalya
- Main ingredients: Goat milk, Salep, sugar

Yanıksı Dondurma (Burnt Ice Cream) is a dessert in Turkish cuisine, specifically the Korkuteli district of Antalya. It is made from goat's milk, salep, and sugar. It has a smoky, slightly charred flavor profile. The dish is included in the Ark of Taste, and the making of it is an Intangible Cultural Heritage of Turkey.

== Ingredients and preparation ==
Goats raised in the Korkuteli plains graze on wild thyme and other native vegetation, a diet that produces a distinctive flavor profile in their milk.

Goat's milk and salep, a flour made from the dried roots of wild orchids, are boiled together over a wood fire in wide copper cauldrons. The maker deliberately allows the milk to scorch slightly at the bottom. This thin, caramelized layer of scorched milk infuses the ice cream made with it with a smoky, slightly bitter, and intense aroma. Sugar is added to the scorched milk and the mixture is cooled and frozen.

== Characteristics ==
The ice cream has a thick, stretchy, and chewy consistency created by the inclusion of salep. It has a roasted, smoky flavor with earthiness from the goat's milk and salep. Because of its dense texture, it is usually served in slices.

== History ==
The story of Yanıksı Dondurma dates back to times before modern refrigeration and cooling systems existed. To prevent milk from spoiling quickly in the hot Mediterranean climate, it had to be boiled for extended periods over a roaring fire. During this long boiling process, it was inevitable that the milk would scorch at the bottom of the pot.

Over an extended period, the inhabitants of the Antalya and Korkuteli regions developed a distinct culinary preference and familiarity with this characteristic smoky flavor profile. What initially originated as an unintended consequence of the heating process gradually evolved beyond an accidental production outcome into a recognized regional specialty. In contemporary regional cuisine, this specific scorched taste has become a deliberate and documented gastronomic tradition that is actively sought out by consumers and closely associated with the area's local food culture.

== Importance ==
The making of burnt ice cream is an Intangible Cultural Heritage of Turkey. The dish is included in the Slow Food Ark of Taste.
