= Bici bici =

Light summer dessert from Southern Turkey, especially Adana and Mersin provinces

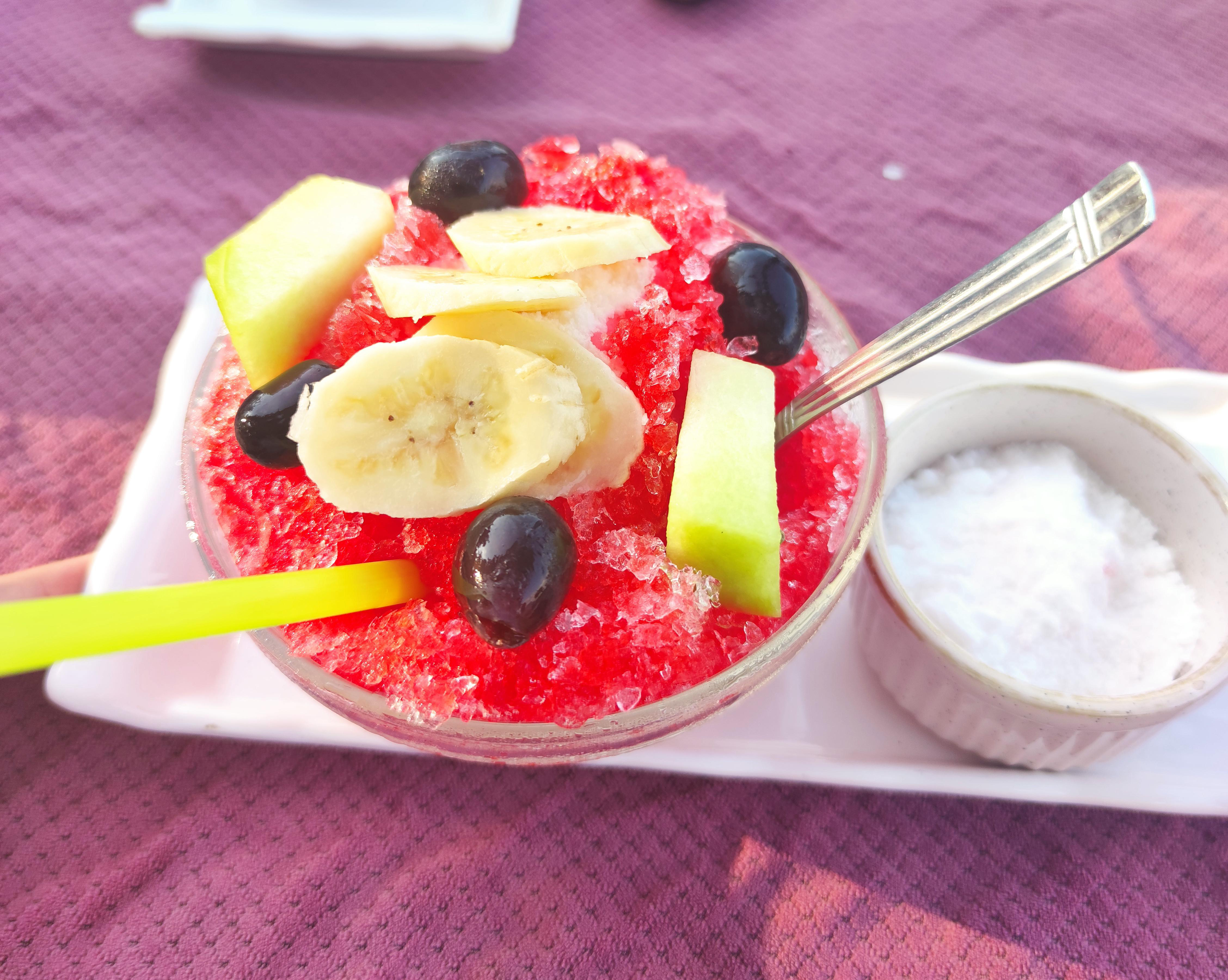
Bici bici, a kind of Turkish dessert unique to Adana Province.

Bici bici or bicibici muhallebisi is a Turkish dessert.

== Description ==
Bici bici is a very light dessert, typical of southern Turkey and the Mediterranean region in general, especially the provinces of Adana and Mersin, where it is especially consumed in the summer. The name of the dessert comes from the sound made when the starch is squeezed between the fingers.

== Production ==
Bici bici is prepared with crushed ice, starch, and syrup. Once the starch is cooked in water, it is left to cool in a tray and then chopped - this part of the dessert is called bici. Then, it is flavored with the syrup to taste, usually rose flavored, and is draped over ice, finally served with sugar on top. The ice should be ground finely enough so that it immediately melts in one’s mouth and does not have to be chewed with the teeth.

== See also ==
- Dondurma
