= Muhallebi =

Milk-based dessert pudding

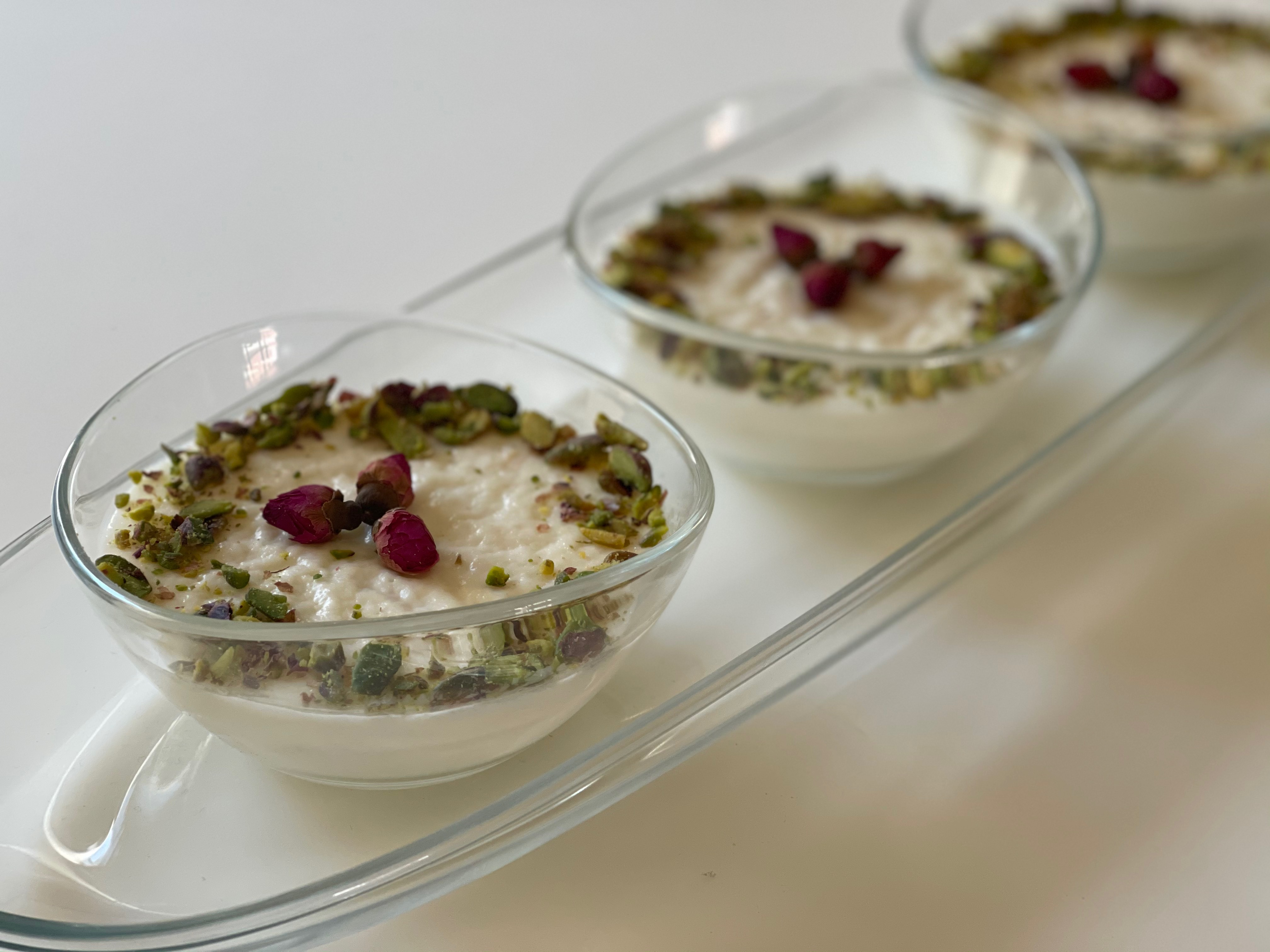
- Muhallebi decorated with pistachios and rose petals
- Course: Pudding
- Place of origin: Sasanian Empire
- Region or state: Middle East
- Serving temperature: Cold
- Main ingredients: Rice flour, milk or almond milk, sugar, starch or semolina

Muhallebi (Persian: مهلبی), or muhalabiyya (Arabic: مهلّبية), is a milk pudding commonly made with rice, sugar, and milk, thickened with either rice flour, starch or semolina. It is popular as a dessert in the Middle East.

== History ==
According to legend, muhallebi was introduced into Arab cuisine in the late 7th century by a Persian cook from the then Sasanian Empire. He served it to the Arab general Al-Muhallab ibn Abi Sufra, who liked it so much that he named it after himself.

The earliest recipes, dating to the 10th century, featured three versions: milk thickened with ground rice, milk with rice grains and chicken, and an egg custard without rice. Early recipes for muhallabiyya include a work attributed to Ibn Sayyar al-Warraq of Baghdad and two 13th-century Arab cookbooks, one by al-Baghdadi and another from Al Andalus that have a spiced pudding variation made with mutton instead of chicken. In the Middle Ages, muhallebi and its European counterpart blancmange were made with shredded chicken.

Muhallebi was also found in the Ottoman Empire, being adopted from the earlier Byzantine Greeks. There are records from the Ottoman Empire for two versions of muhallebi: a version with shredded chicken (tavuk göğsü) served during the reign of Mehmed the Conqueror, and a later recipe dating to 1530 for a meatless version flavored with rose water.

One 19th-century, English cookbook that gives a recipe for muhallebi calls it "Ramazan cakes". The recipe calls for boiling milk together with rice flour and sugar until the mixture reduces. The pudding is flavored with rose or jasmine extract, and allowed to cool before it is sprinkled with powdered sugar.

== Etymology ==
Different names are often used for the corn flour and rice flour varieties. In Arabic, balouza (Arabic: بالوظة, romanized: bālūẓah) is often used to refer to rose flavored cornstarch milk pudding.

The word bālūẓah (بالوظة) is derived from the Persian pâlude (Persian: پالوده); itself a Persian confection (faloodeh).

== Variations ==
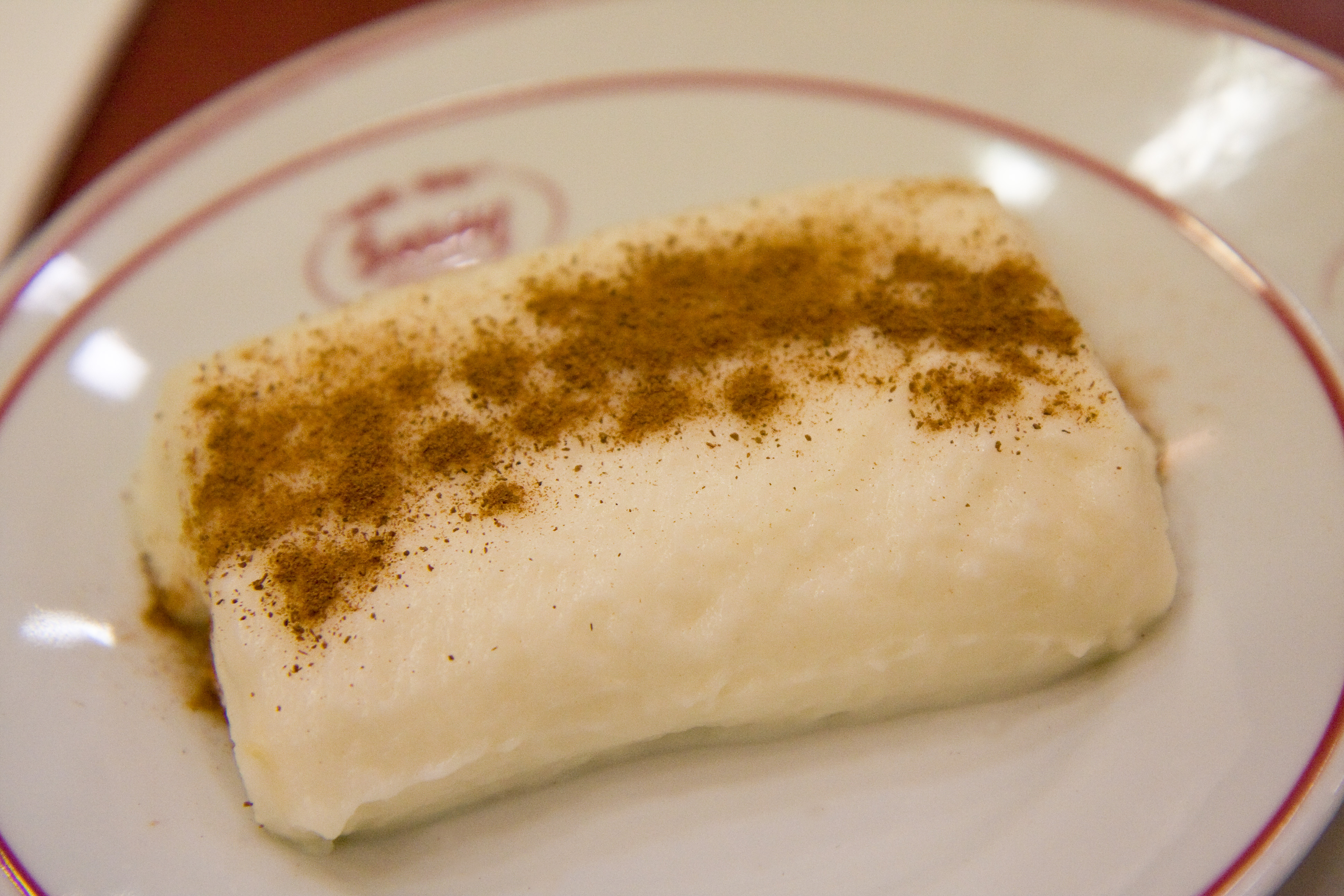
Old-fashioned tavuk göğsü from Turkish cuisine

=== Regional ===
==== Turkey ====
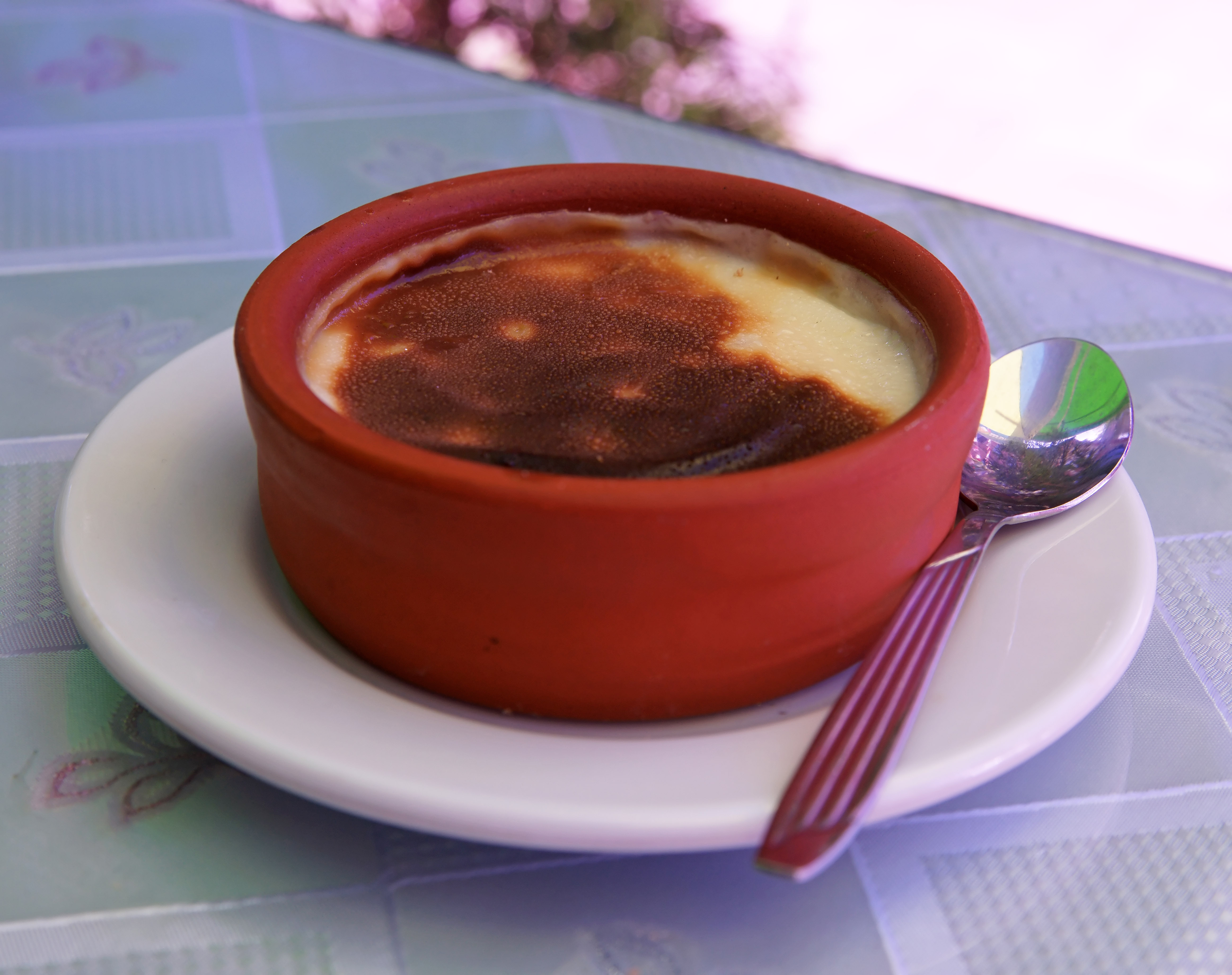
Turkish oven-baked sütlaç (rice pudding).

In the modern era the traditional tavuk göğsü is no longer widely available, except in Turkey. This pudding does not taste like chicken but the shredded meat gives it a distinctive texture. George Coleman De Kay said the pudding "owes its peculiar excellent flavour to the presence of the breasts of very young chickens, which are by some means so intimately blended and incorporated with the custard as to be scarcely distinguishable". Kazandibi is the variation of classic tavuk göğsü where a thin layer of pudding is caramelized before the custard is poured over it and allowed to set. The finished pudding is served upside down with the caramelized side on top. Also available at the muhallebici shops of Istanbul are the almond based keşkül, Noah's Pudding, and baked rice pudding called "fırın sütlaç" or "fırında sütlaç".

==== Levant ====
In Syria, there is a variation of محلاية ("mahalayeh") called بالوظة ("balouza") that is the classic milk pudding but with a layer of orange jelly on top. Other flavours of the jelly layer can be used, like rose syrup. Mahalayeh sold in restaurants in Syria is always served with three striped toppings of slivered almonds, cream, sliced pistachios, and a maraschino cherry. The famous booza shop, Bakdash, in Damascus, serves mahalayeh as well as booza.

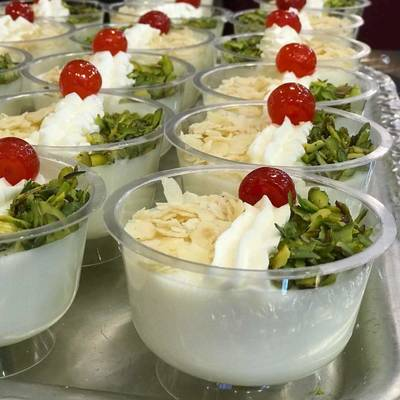
Syrian style of serving mahalayeh in shops

In Lebanon, versions of balouza that are flavored with orange blossom water are served in restaurants.

In Palestine, variations of muhallabia and balouza can be found in Hebron, they are made with pasteurized milk, starch, and are topped with qatir. In the Gaza Strip, pudding layers flavored with sour plum jam or orange juice are added to it, like a parfait.

In Israel, in order to avoid violating Kashrut (Jewish dietary laws), variations of malabi (Hebrew: מלבי) use almond milk instead of regular milk, especially when offered in conjunction with meat dishes.

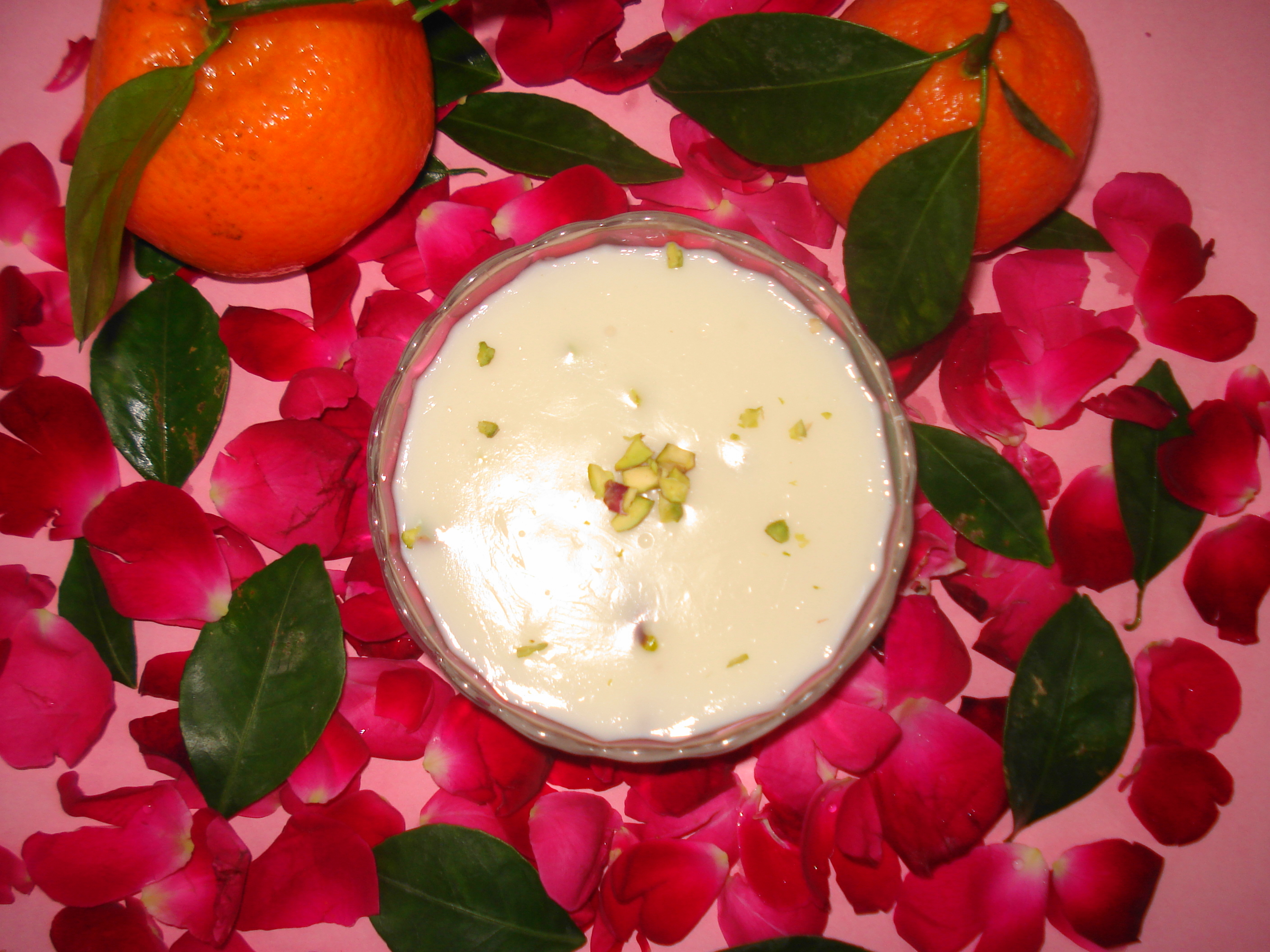
Egyptian mahalabia garnished with chopped nuts

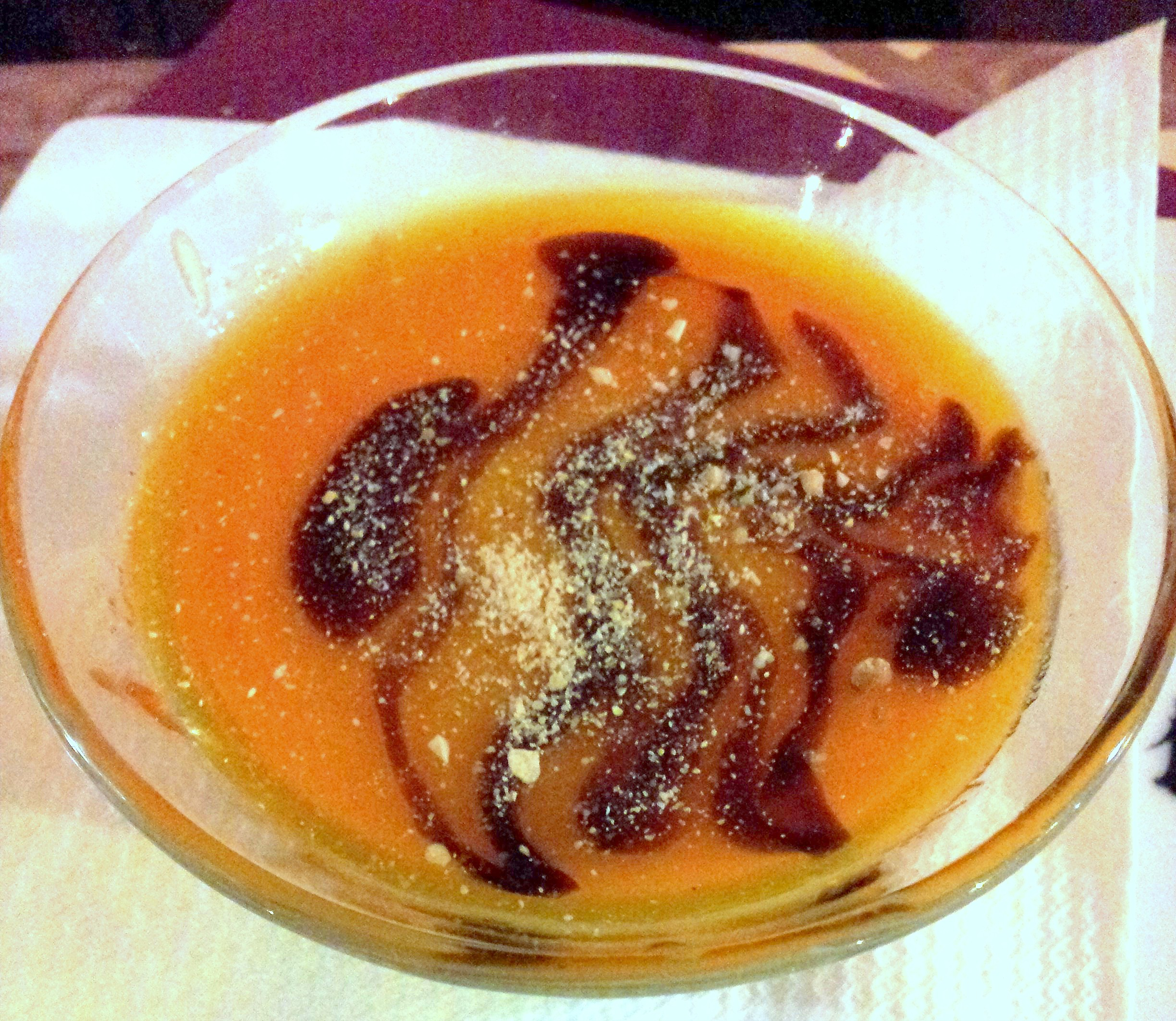
Moroccan-style mahalabiya with orange flavoring

In Cyprus, muhallebi is called "μαχαλλεπί (Greek pronunciation: [maxalːeˈpi] in Cypriot Greek)" and it can also be found in a non-dairy version alongside the version that contains milk (μαχαλλεπίν του γαλάτου; [maxalːeˈpin du ɣaˈlatu]). The Cypriot non-dairy muhallebi is made from water, sugar, cornstarch, and rose water, which is optional. When the muhallebi is set, Cypriots add rose squash/cordial/syrup called "triantafyllo" (τριαντάφυλλο) on top of it.

==== Egypt ====
In Egypt, variations of balouza made from milk and starch are traditionally made during Ramadan, it is prepared in a large batch and then cut into small pieces and served with toppings like honey.

=== By ingredient ===
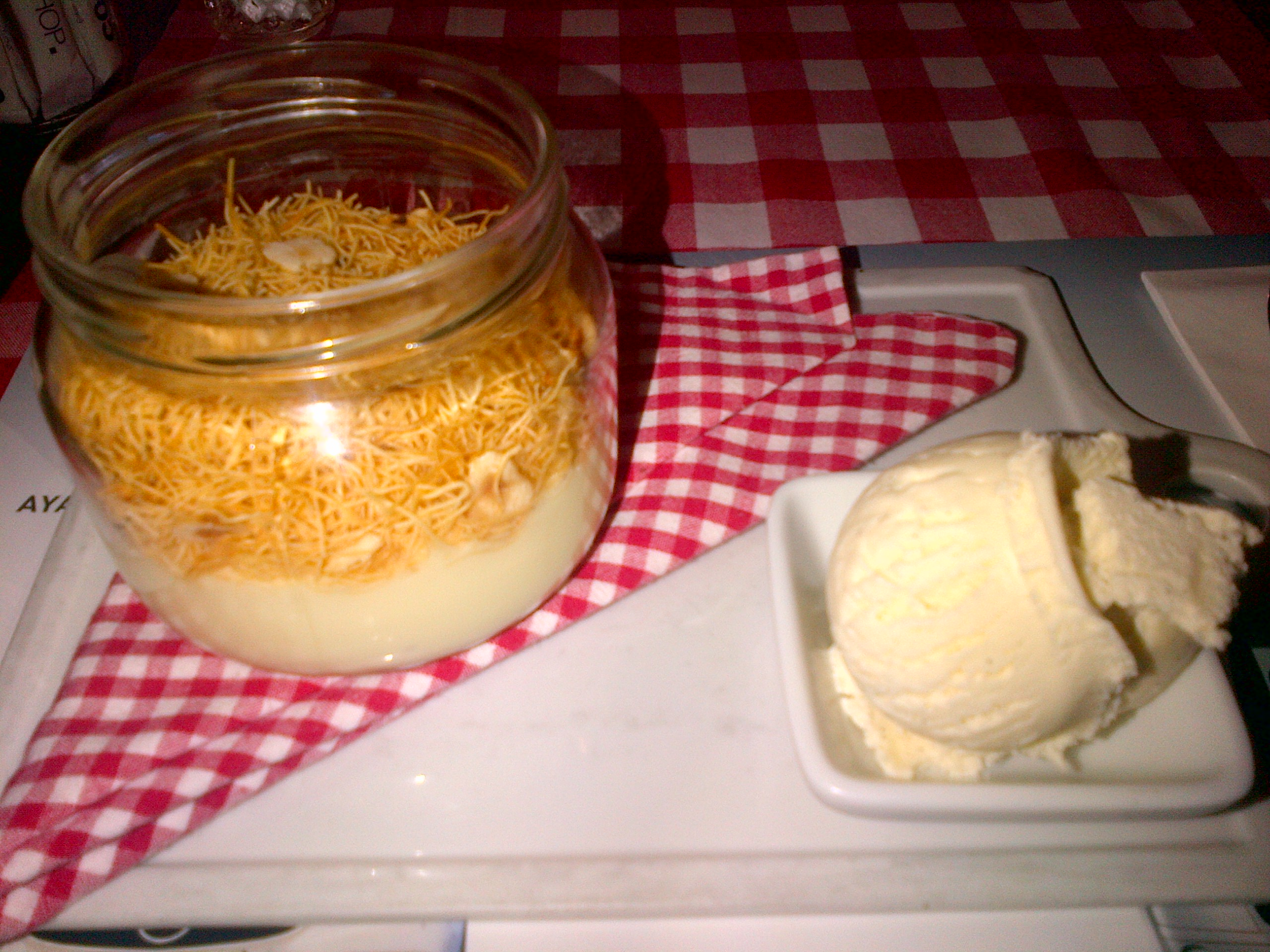
Turkish dessert made with muhallebi and kadayif

Mastic is a popular flavoring for muhallebi. Qamar al-Din is another popular flavouring, especially during Ramadan in the Levant, as well as Egypt.

Knafeh pastry (kadayif) is a popular topping for muhallebi.

== Culinary traditions ==
In some Sephardic Jewish homes, malabi, made of milk, cream, starch and sugar and flavoured with either distilled rosewater or orange flower water, is served to break the fast on the Jewish holiday of Yom Kippur. It is also eaten at Turkish Jewish weddings to symbolize the sweet life that lies ahead. Sephardim serve it on the festival of Shavuot when it is customary to eat dairy food, but according to food historian Gil Marks, the real reason is that the holiday is known in this community as the "feast of roses" and the dessert has a distinct rosy aroma.

== Use in desserts ==
Muhallebi is used as a component of many traditional style desserts.

Selanik tatlısı, attributed to the kitchens of historic Salonica, is made by thickening a basic stovetop muhallebi with eggs and baking it with a sweetened shortcrust pastry. The dessert is soaked in simple syrup before serving. Also hailing from historic Salonica is muhallebi baklava (similar to the Greek galaktoboureko).

== See also ==
- Keşkül
- Kheer
- Om Ali
- Sholezard
