= Pepeçura =

Turkish grape dessert from the Black Sea Region

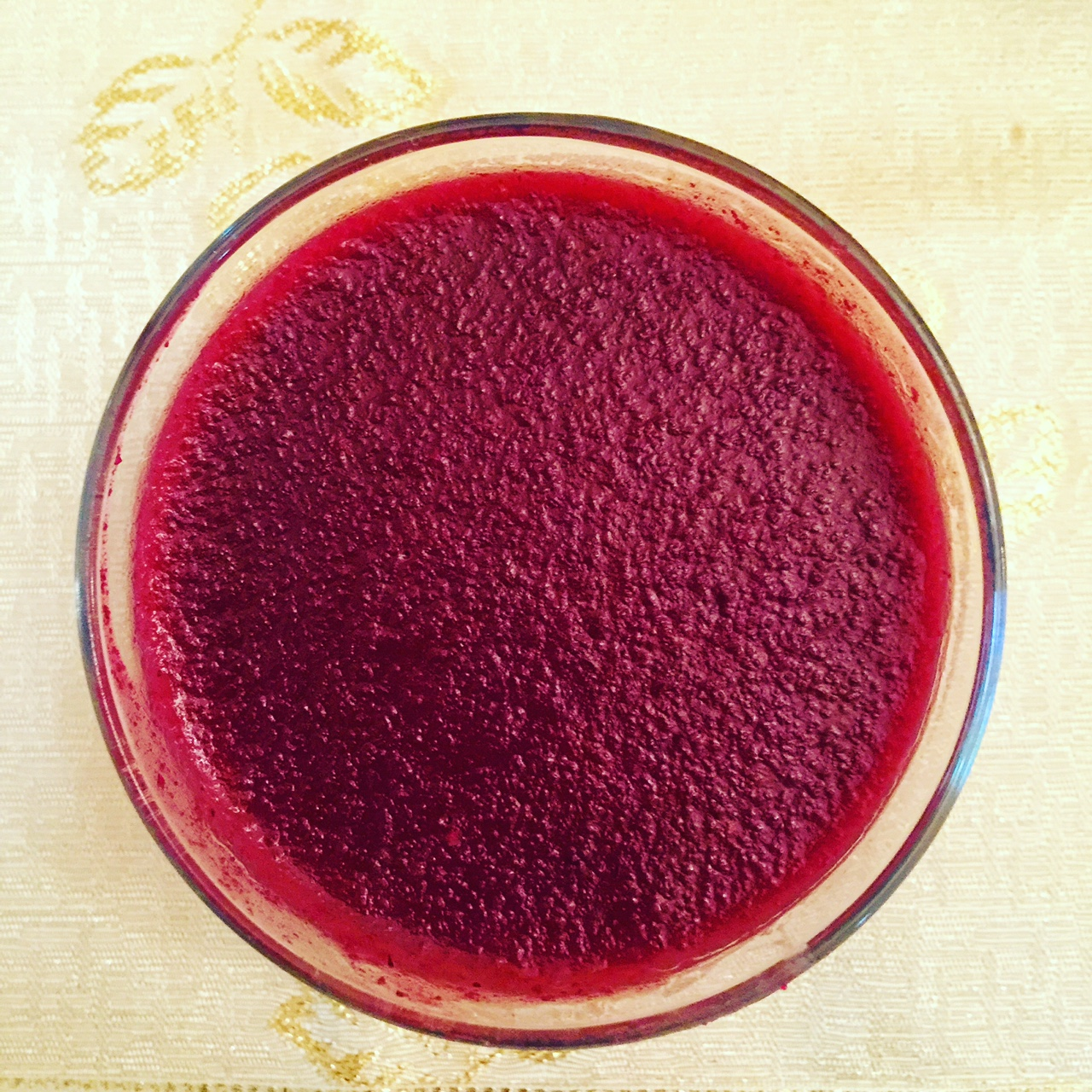
- Type: Pudding
- Place of origin: Turkey
- Main ingredients: Grape must, flour

Pepeçura is a sort of pudding in the Turkish cuisine, especially of the eastern Black Sea Region, made of grape must mixed with flour and boiled until thick. It may also include almonds, walnuts, and other nuts.

Grape must is the juice from pressed grapes before fermentation, and is often used as a sweetener in traditional bread recipes, as well as in the preparation of desserts and candy. This grape must pie is a favorite, especially popular at grape harvest season when the must is fresh.

== Sources ==
- http://www.kulturportali.gov.tr/turkiye/rize/neyenir/pepecura
- http://yemek.haber7.com/yoresel-lezzetler/haber/950937-rize-mutfagina-ait-pepecura-tarifi
- http://www.kanald.com.tr/mutfagim/Haberler/Pepecura-Tarifi/49940.aspx
