= Mastic =

Mastic may refer to:

== Adhesives and pastes ==
- Mastic (plant resin)
- Mastic asphalt, a sticky, black, and highly viscous liquid
- Mastic cold porcelain, a traditional salt-based modeling clay
- Joint compound or mastic, a paste of gypsum dust and water used on drywall

== Places ==
- Mastic, New York, United States, a hamlet and census-designated place
- Mastic Reserve, Cayman Islands

== Other uses ==
- Mastic tree (disambiguation)
- USS Mastic, a World War II net laying ship
- Mastic station, a former Long Island Rail Road station
- Mastic Flight Strip, original name of Brookhaven Airport, Shirley, New York, United States

== See also ==
- Mastic Beach, New York, United States, a hamlet and census-designated place
- Mastic–Shirley station, LIRR station in Shirley, New York, United States
- George Mastics (1931–2018), American politician
- Donald Mastick (1920–2007), American chemist
- Seabury C. Mastick (1871–1969), American politician
- Mastika, a liqueur with added mastic aroma
- Chios Mastiha, a liqueur flavoured with mastic distillate or mastic oil
