= Kaysefe =

Turkish dessert made of dried fruits topped with melted butter

Kaysefe is a Turkish dessert made of dried fruits and melted butter. It is a regional specialty of Erzurum. Different fruits may be used including dried apricots or mulberries. First the dried fruit is boiled in water with sugar. Butter is spooned over the boiled fruit and the dessert is garnished with chopped or ground walnuts, pistachios or hazelnuts.

== See also ==
- List of Turkish desserts
