= Ayva tatlısı =

Turkish dessert made with quince fruits

Quince dessert
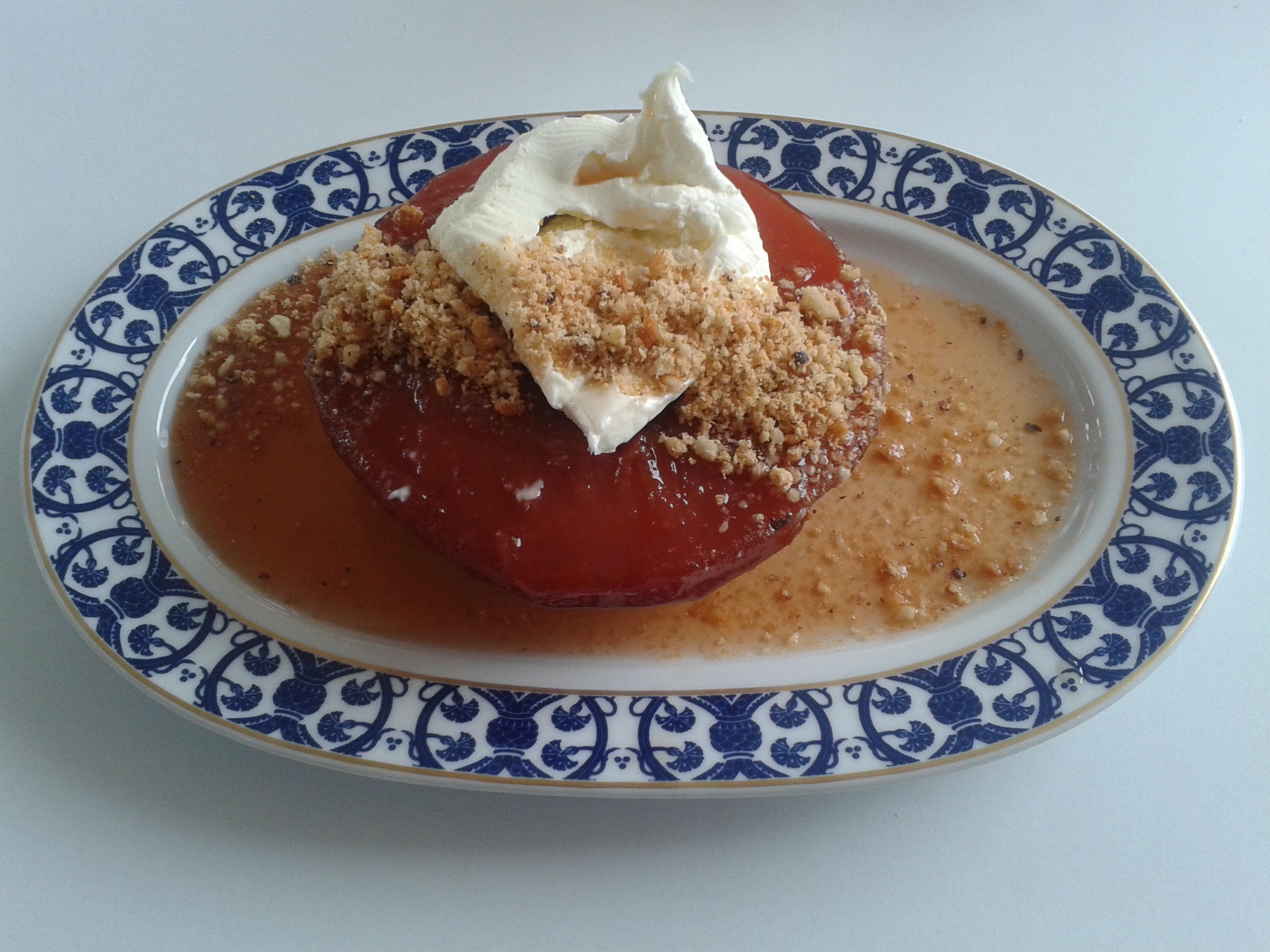
- Course: Dessert
- Place of origin: Turkey
- Serving temperature: Warm or cold
- Main ingredients: Quince fruit, cloves, water, sugar, and kaymak and walnuts for topping and decoration

Ayva tatlısı is a dessert from Turkish cuisine that is made with quince. The quince is cooked by boiling in water or in the oven with cloves, sweet syrup and filled with apple or quince meal, raisins and topped with kaymak, or ice cream. It is often served as halves, with the inside slightly carved out. The dish is eaten warm and cold throughout Turkey, particularly during wintertime.

== See also ==
- Turkish cuisine
