= Orcik candy =

Candied churchkhela

Orcik candy (Turkish: orcik şekeri) is a confection made of walnuts and a slightly fermented juice called şıra that is made with grapes or blackberries. It is a regional specialty of Elazığ. It is similar to churchkhela (called cevizli sucuk in Turkish), but the walnut and grape mixture is stuffed into hand pulled candy.
