= Tavukgöğsü =

Ottoman milk pudding made with chicken breast

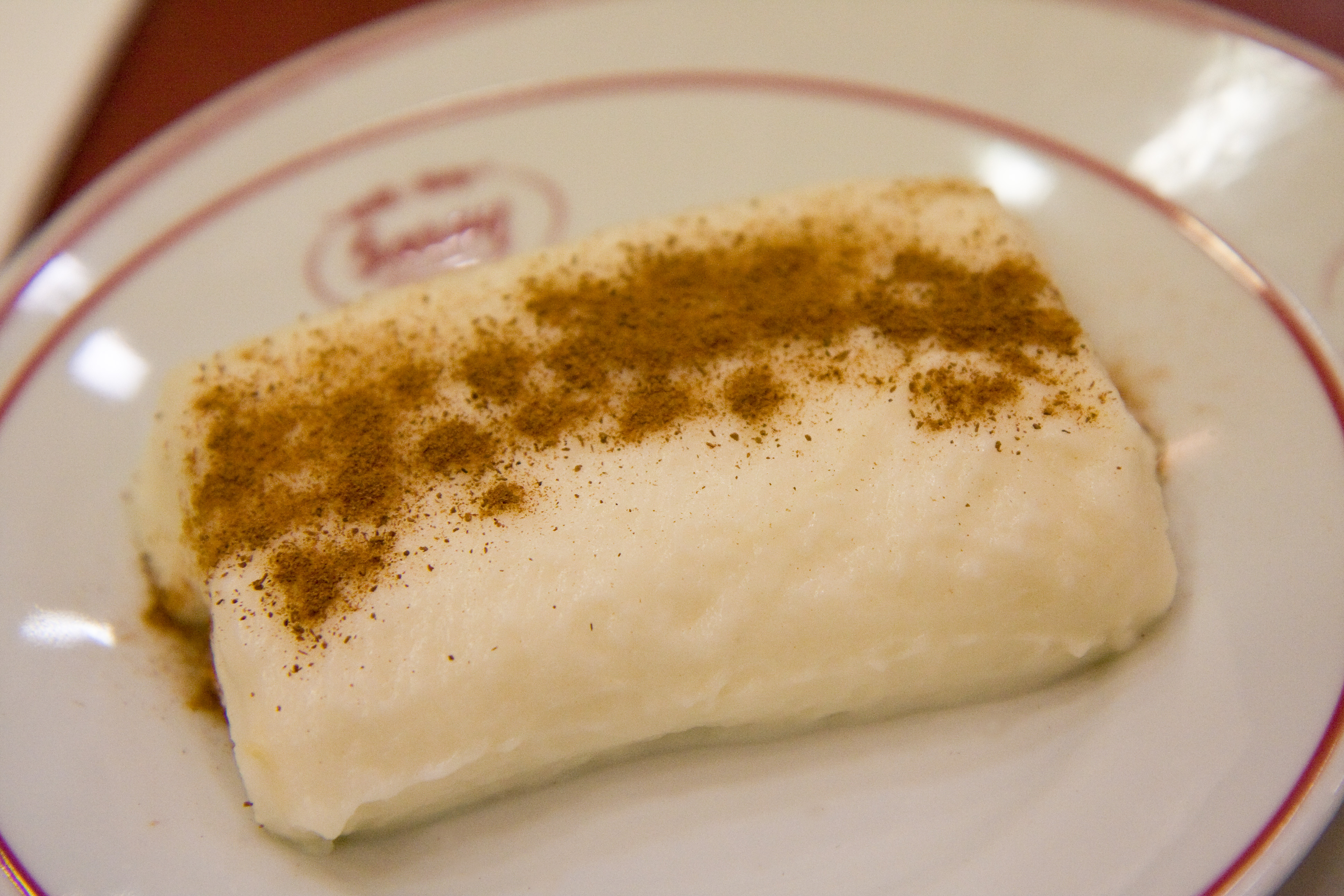
- Alternative names: Tavuk göğsü
- Type: Pudding
- Course: Dessert
- Main ingredients: Chicken, milk, sugar, rice flour

Tavukgöğsü (Turkish: tavukgöğsü, [taˈvukɟœːˈsy], 'chicken breast') is a Turkish milk pudding made with shredded chicken breast. It was served to Ottoman sultans in the Topkapı Palace, and is now a well-known dish in Turkey.

It has long been assumed that this chicken pudding had originated in the Roman recipe collection Apicius, and it was later on passed to Eastern Roman Empire (Byzantium) and subsequently to the Ottoman Empire. According to Utku Can Topçu (2023), no surviving copies of Apicius include such a recipe. Similar Arab dishes from the tenth century exist. Considering the lack of evidence for the Roman connection, the possible introduction of tavukgöğsü into Turkish cuisine is likely of Arab origin. According to food historian Murat Doğan (2025), an Arab origin is more likely than Byzantine or Roman origin theories, with related desserts probably entering both Byzantine and Turkish cuisines through Arab influence.

The traditional version uses white chicken breast meat. The meat is softened by boiling and separating the meat into very fine fibers or pounding until smooth. The meat is mixed with milk, sugar, cracked rice and other thickeners, and often some sort of flavoring such as cinnamon. The result is a thick pudding often shaped for presentation.

The dish is very similar to the medieval "white dish" (blancmange) that was common in the upper-class cuisine of Europe, and mentioned in The Canterbury Tales (though blancmange has since evolved into very different forms in modern Europe and Latin America).

== See also ==
- Akutaq – another dessert made of fish meat
- Dillegrout – a medieval dish of similar ingredients served to the kings of England
- List of chicken dishes

== Bibliography ==
- Basan, Ghillie (2005). The Middle Eastern Kitchen. Hippocrene Books. ISBN 978-078-181-1.
- Günur, M.Işın-E (1990). Turkish Cookery. Istanbul: Net Turistik Yayınlar. ISBN 975-479-100-7.
- Humes, Michele (20 Aug 2009). "When Meat Becomes Dessert". The Atlantic.
- Coe, Sophie Dobzhansky (1994). America's first cuisines. University of Texas Press. ISBN 978-0-292-71159-4.
- https://web.archive.org/web/20100723190438/http://moreintelligentlife.com/content/lifestyle/jon-fasman/repasts-blanc-manger
