= Kemal Pasha dessert =

Turkish dessert

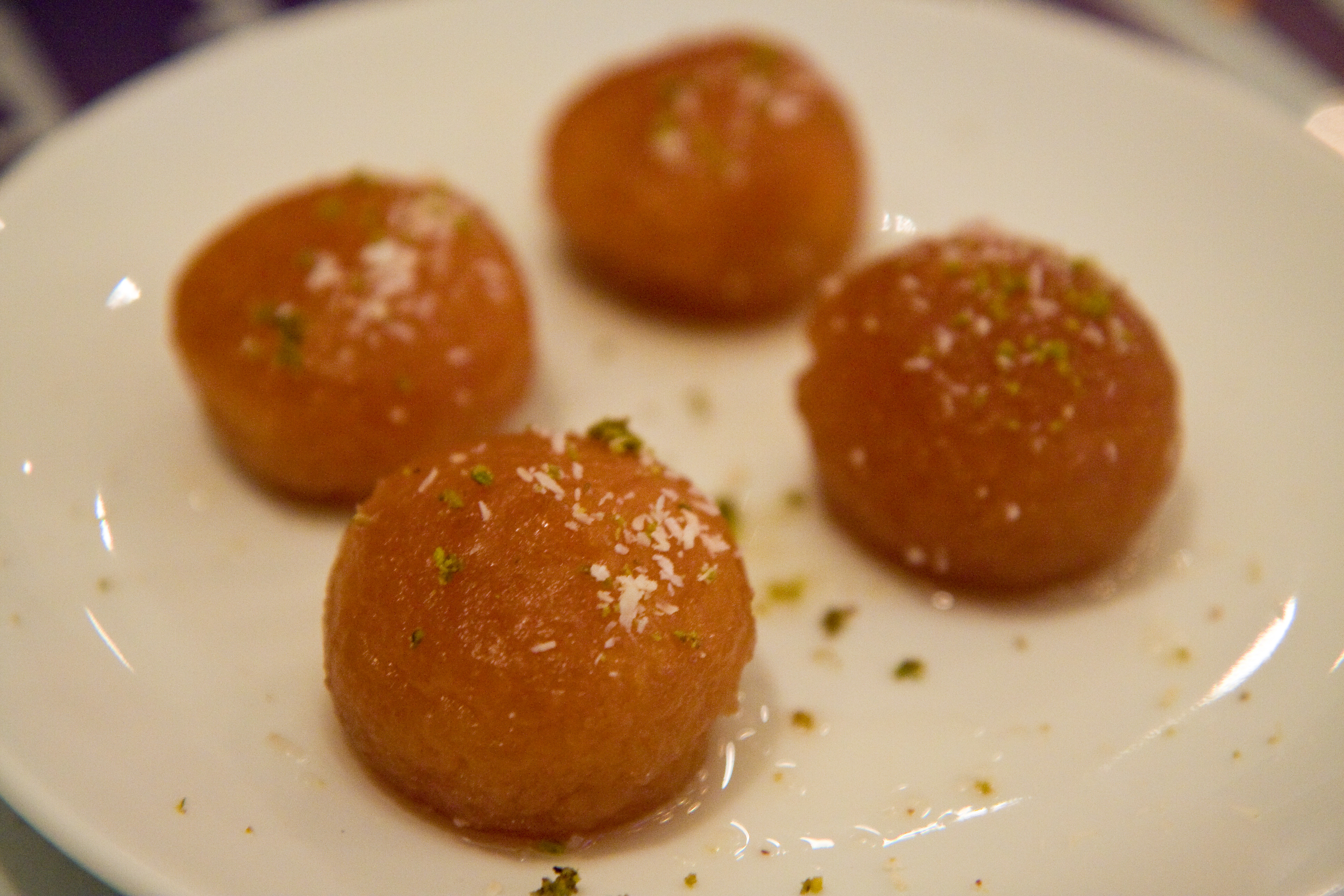
- Course: Dessert
- Region or state: Turkey
- Serving temperature: Hot, cold, or room temp
- Main ingredients: Dough of flour, unsalted cheese, semolina, egg, water and baking powder
- Variations: Kala jamun, Gulab jamun

Kemal Pasha dessert (Turkish: Kemalpaşa tatlısı) is a Turkish dessert dish. It originates from the district of Mustafakemalpaşa, Bursa Province, in Turkey. Traditionally it is made using a cheese variety that is particular to the region.

The dessert is prepared from a dough of flour, unsalted cheese, semolina, egg, water and baking powder. The dough is formed into small balls that are fried and then boiled in syrup. It can be eaten fresh or dried. In dried form, it is often packaged in boxes of 24-50 portions. It is served with kaymak in winter and with ice cream in summer.

== See also ==
- Gulab jamun
- Bamiyeh
- Tangyuan
- Chè xôi nước
- Loukoumades
- Doughnut holes
