= Mercimek köftesi =

Turkish cold dish (or meze) of "balls" of boiled red lentils, bulgur, green onions etc

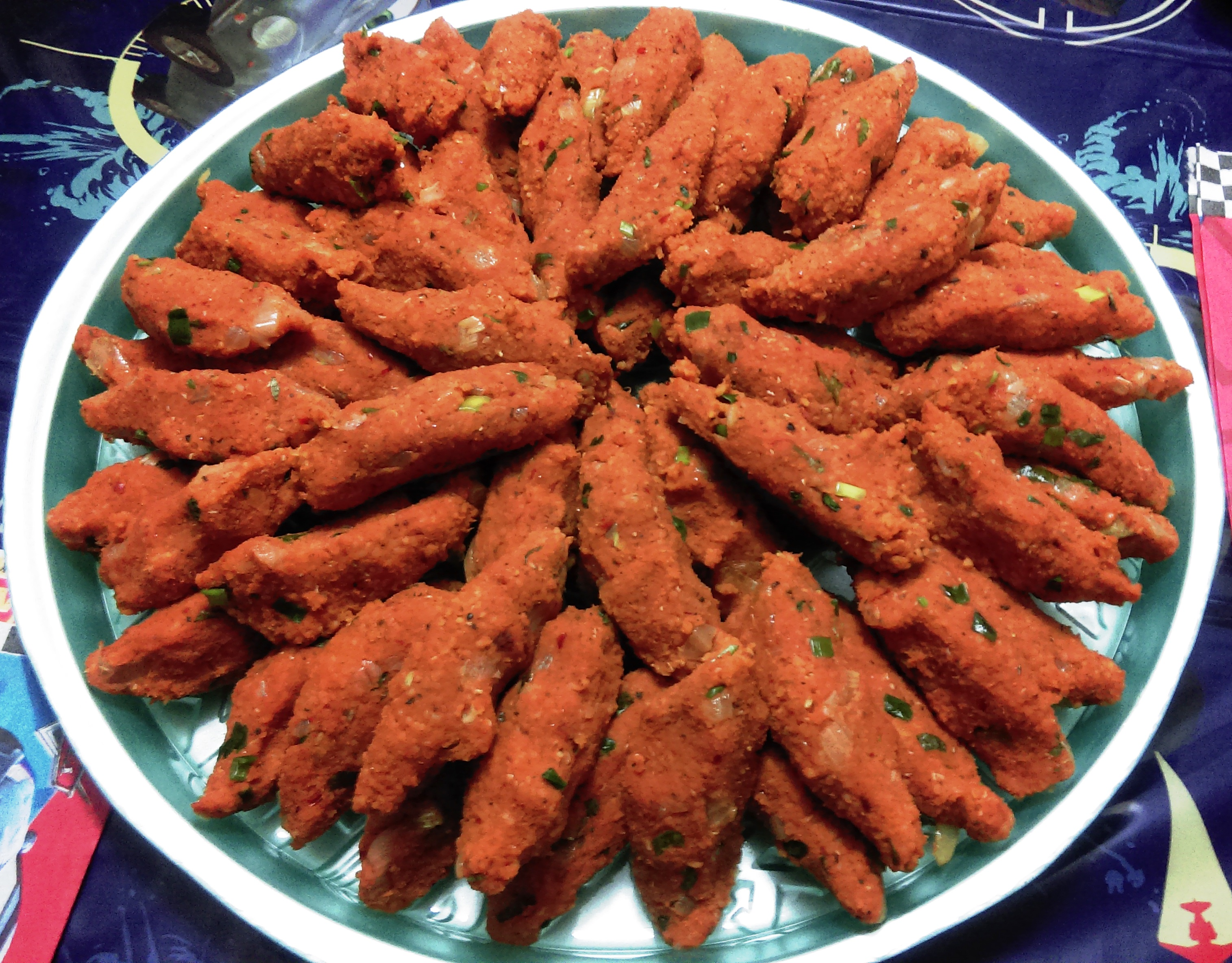
- Course: Side dish, meze, salad
- Place of origin: Turkey
- Associated cuisine: Turkish cuisine
- Main ingredients: lentil, bulgur, parsley, tomato paste

Mercimek köftesi, also known as lentil balls, is a lentil-based cold dish or meze found in Turkish cuisine. Considered one of the foods that symbolize the importance of Anatolian hospitality, it is often served in events such as 5 o'clock tea and special occasion meals. Adana province is specifically famous for this dish's popularity.

Lentil balls are prepared from split red lentils along with tomato paste, fine bulgur, parsley, onion, and other spices. Proportions of ingredients and types of spices used may differ in different regions.

The preparation requires cooking of lentils in water to a mushy texture, followed by addition of fine bulgur which absorbs liquid from the boiled lentils without additional cooking. Onions roasted in olive oil, tomato paste, spices and herbs are added for flavor. This thick consistency batter is then shaped in a palm in a cylindrical form, and served with lettuce and vegetables on side. Mercimek köftesi may also be served as a wrap with lettuce and tahini sauce, but it is then called lentil falafel.

American Institute for Cancer Research (AICR) in 2015 put mercimek köftesi in a list of 7 dishes from local cuisines from all around the world which are considered to fight cancer, especially reduce the risk of colorectal cancer.

== Regional mercimek köftesi styles ==
South-central:

- Gaziantep mercimek köftesi (or Malhıtalı/Maltıkalı Küfte in the regional Turkish dialect)
- Osmaniye mercimek köftesi

Southeastern:

- Diyarbakır Belluh
- Mardin Belloğ

== See also ==
- List of salads
- Eetch
- Tabbouleh
- Çiğ köfte
