= Fava (disambiguation) =

Fava may refer to:

- Vicia faba, a leguminous plant whose beans are also known as broad beans or fava beans.
- Fava (Greek dish), a puree made of split peas.
- Fava (Turkish dish), a puree made of fava beans.
