= Beyran soup =

Turkish soup

Beyran
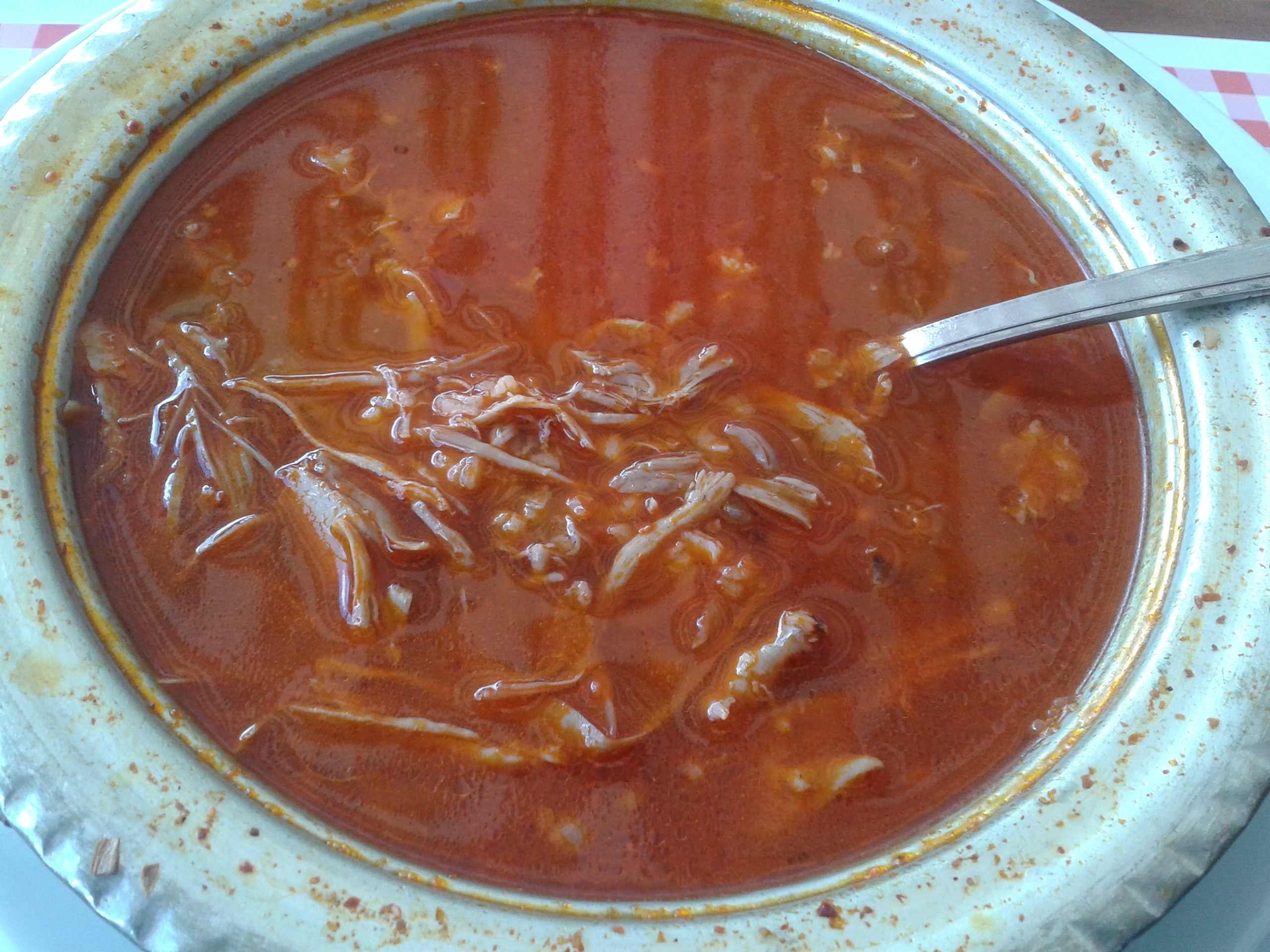
- Course: Main course
- Place of origin: Turkey
- Region or state: Gaziantep
- Serving temperature: Hot
- Main ingredients: Minced meat, onion, egg, black pepper, salt, lamb meat, butter

Beyran, also known as Beyran soup, is a Turkish soup originating in Gaziantep, Turkey, where it's commonly served for breakfast. It is made from lamb neck and lamb cheek. Other ingredients that compose the soup include rice, garlic, butter, oil, water, salt, pepper paste, black pepper, and Aleppo pepper flakes.
