= Eech =

Eech may refer to:

- Eetch, a traditional Armenian side dish
- the Luxembourgish name of Eich (in French), a neighbourhood in the city of Luxembourg
