= Kısır =

Turkish bulgur salad dish

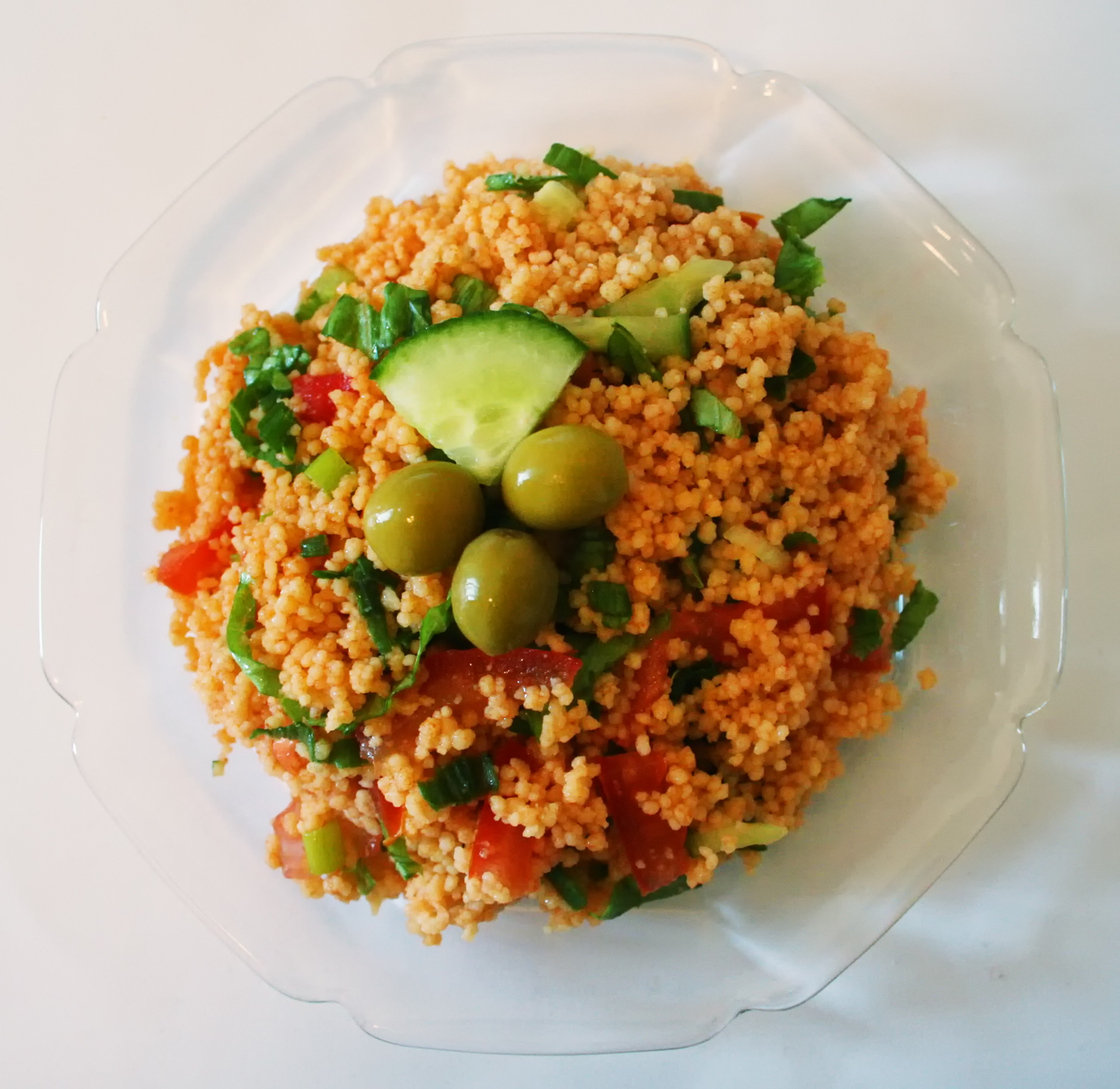
- A plate of kısır decorated with green olives and cucumber pieces
- Alternative names: Infertile
- Course: Side dish, salad, meze
- Place of origin: Turkey
- Main ingredients: Finely ground bulgur, parsley, tomato paste
- Similar dishes: Çiğ köfte

Kısır is a bulgur based salad found in Turkish cuisine. The main ingredients are finely ground bulgur, parsley, and tomato paste. Common additional ingredients include onion, garlic (in some regions), sour pomegranate molasses, olive oil and lemon juice, cucumber, cornichons and spices. It can be served with lettuce leaves. It has a reddish color due to tomato paste admixture. It is served at room temperature as either a side-dish or meze appetizer.

== See also ==
- List of salads
- Eetch
- Tabbouleh
- Turkish cold bulgur soup
- Mercimek köftesi
