= World Spice Merchants =

Shop in Seattle, Washington, U.S.

Coordinates: 47°36′31.1″N 122°20′29.7″W

- Logo

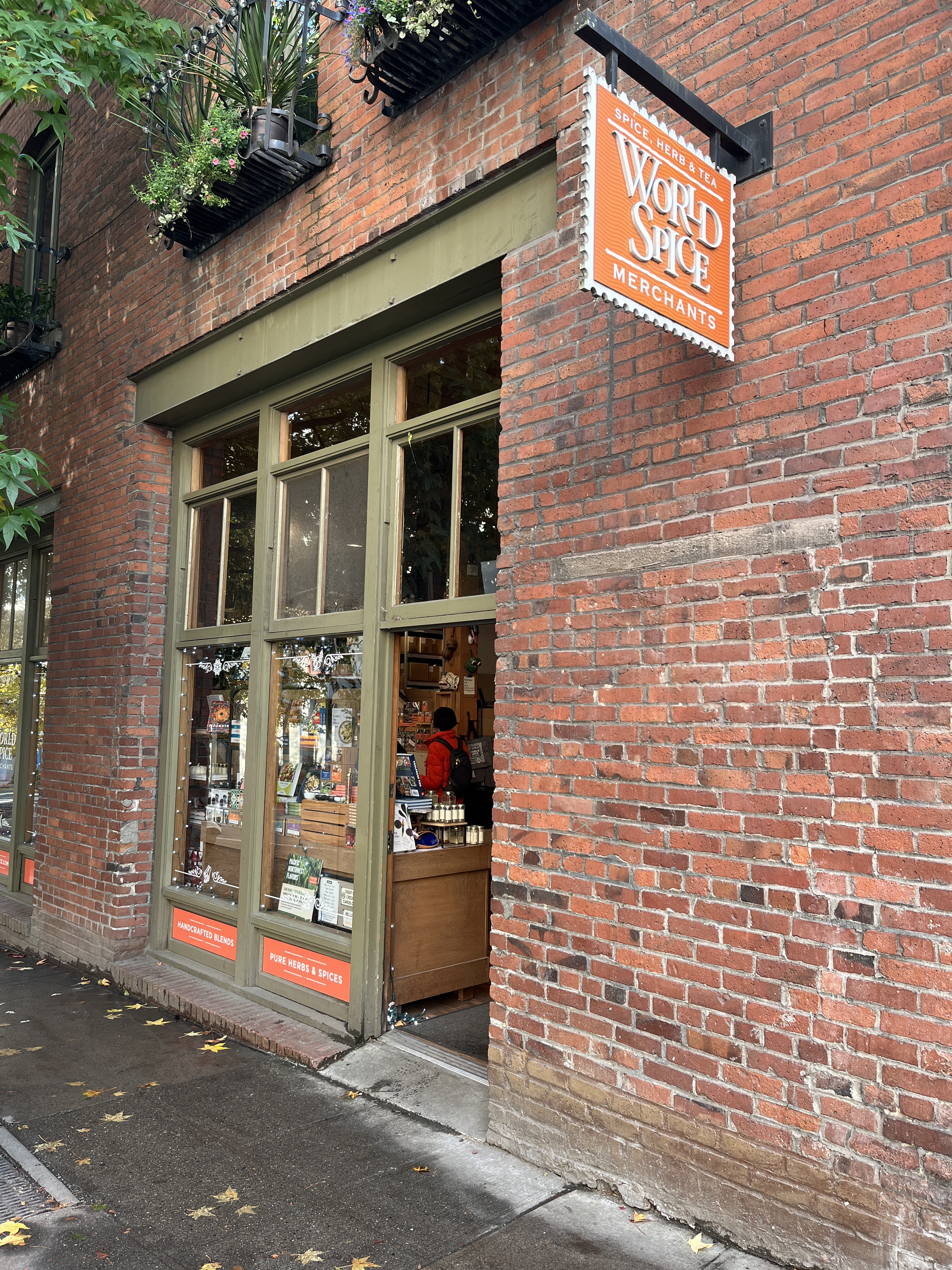
- The shop's exterior, 2022
- Owner: Amanda Bevill
- Website: worldspice.com

World Spice Merchants is a shop near Seattle's Pike Place Market, in the U.S. state of Washington.

== Description ==
World Spice Merchants (WSM) is a shop on Western Avenue near Pike Place Market in Seattle's Central Waterfront district. The store stocks cookbooks, curries, herbs, salts, "exotic" seasonings, spices and rubs, as well as teas from around the world. WSM has carried Aleppo pepper, cinnamon, Mayan cocoa, Seattle Salmon Rub, Tellicherry berries, and vanilla beans. Karl Samson's Frommer's Seattle 2011 says, "The shop boasts of having 100 spices from 50 countries." In addition to stocking spices, WSM makes original blends.

== History ==
Former owner Tony Hill sold the business to longtime employee Amanda Bevill. She is the owner as of 2008.

Bevill and chef Julie Kramis Hearne published World Spice at Home: New Flavors for 75 Favorite Dishes in 2014. Both writers attended an open house at the shop celebrating the book's release.

== Reception ==
Fodor's says, "Many of the city's best chefs get their herbs, spices, and salts at this aromatic shop under Pike Place Market." In 2010, Regina Schrambling of Epicurious described the shop as "wondrous". Sunset called the business "our holy grail for spices" which "wows us with a rush of scents worthy of Istanbul's spice bazaar". In his 2012 book Pike Place Market Recipes, Jess Thomson called WSM "a scratch-and-sniff extravaganza for grown-ups, where what you need is ground to order" and recommended browsing the cookbook library.
