= Turkish cold bulgur soup =

Turkish soup

Bat
- Alternative names: Turkish cold bulgur soup
- Place of origin: Turkey
- Main ingredients: lentil, onion, bulgur wheat, dill, olive oil, tomato paste, sweet paprika, black pepper, parsley, fresh mint.

Turkish cold bulgur soup (Turkish: Bat) is a traditional meal in the cuisine of those in Amasya, Tokat, and Sivas. It is a staple of Turkish cuisine in the aforementioned areas, and it is similar to mercimek köftesi by means of preparation.

== Regional Bat Styles ==
- Tokat Bat

== See also ==
- Kısır
