= Meze =

Small dish in Middle Eastern and Balkan cuisines

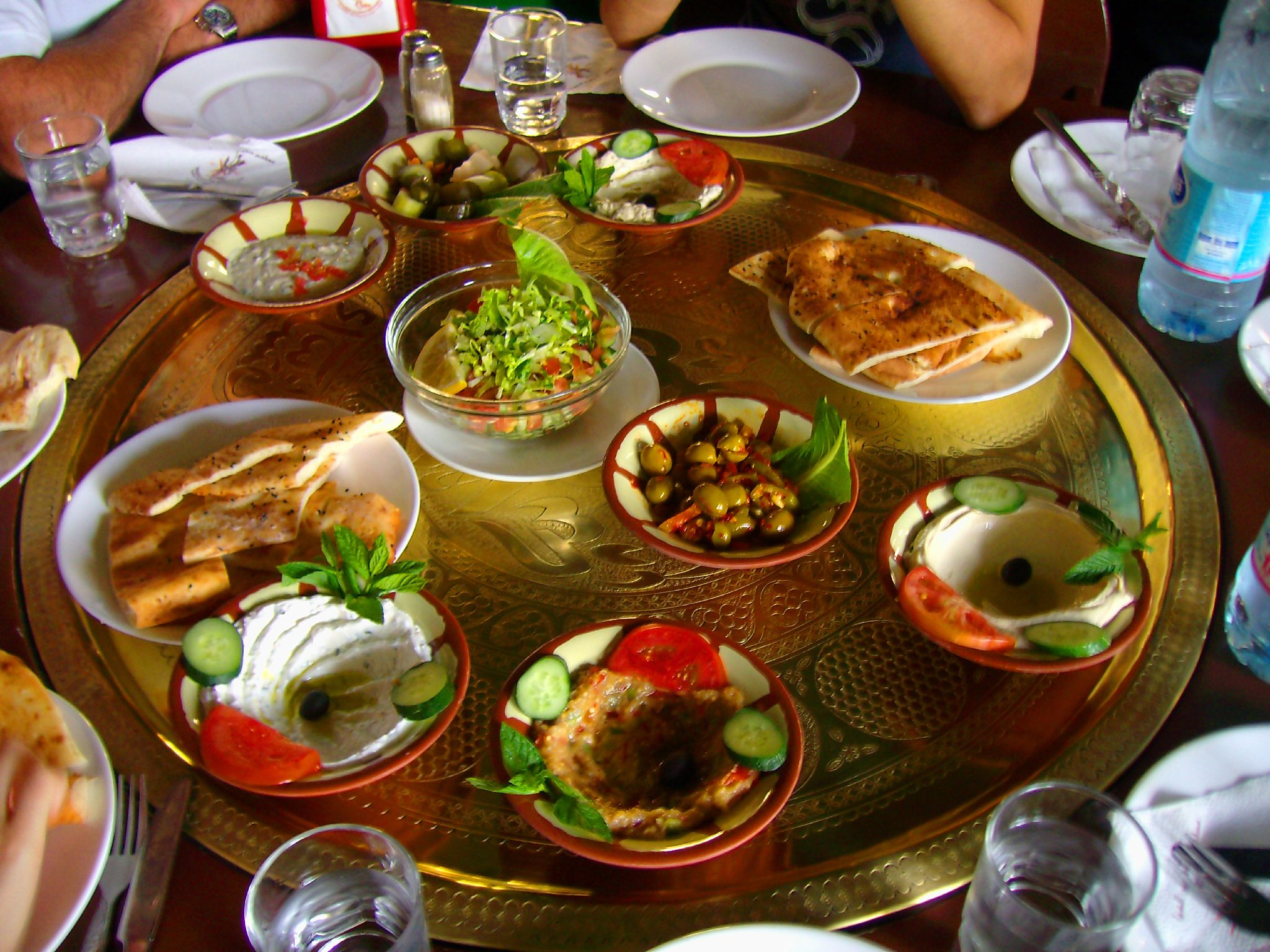
- A large meze platter in Petra, Jordan
- Alternative names: Mezze
- Variations: Numerous

Meze (/ˈmɛzeɪ/ MEZ-ay; also spelled mezze or mezé) is a selection of small dishes served as appetizers in Eastern Mediterranean cuisines. It is similar to Spanish tapas and Italian stuzzichini. A meze may be served as a part of a multi-course meal or form a meal in itself. Meze are often served with spirits such as oghi, ouzo, arak, rakia, raki, or grappa at meyhanes and ouzeria.

== Etymology ==
The word meze, used in all the cuisines of the former Ottoman Empire, is borrowed from the Turkish meze ('appetizer'), which was in turn borrowed from the Persian مَزه maze ('taste' or 'relish').

Ayla Algar locates the possible origins of the word in ancient Persia, where, before nuts and roasted meat were added to the spread, meze may originally have consisted of fruits such as pomegranates, quinces, and citrons to counterbalance the bitterness of unripe wine.

== History ==
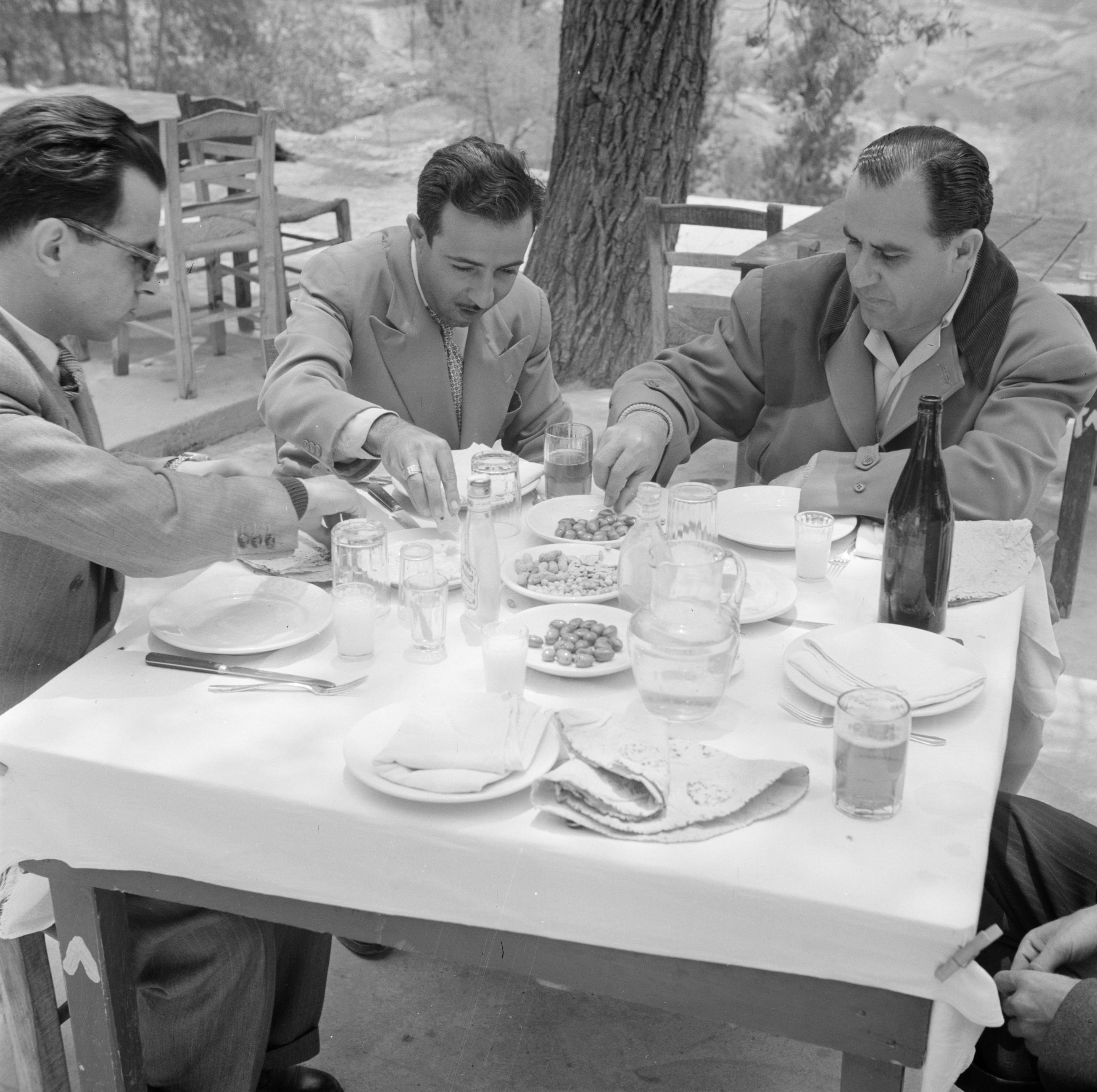
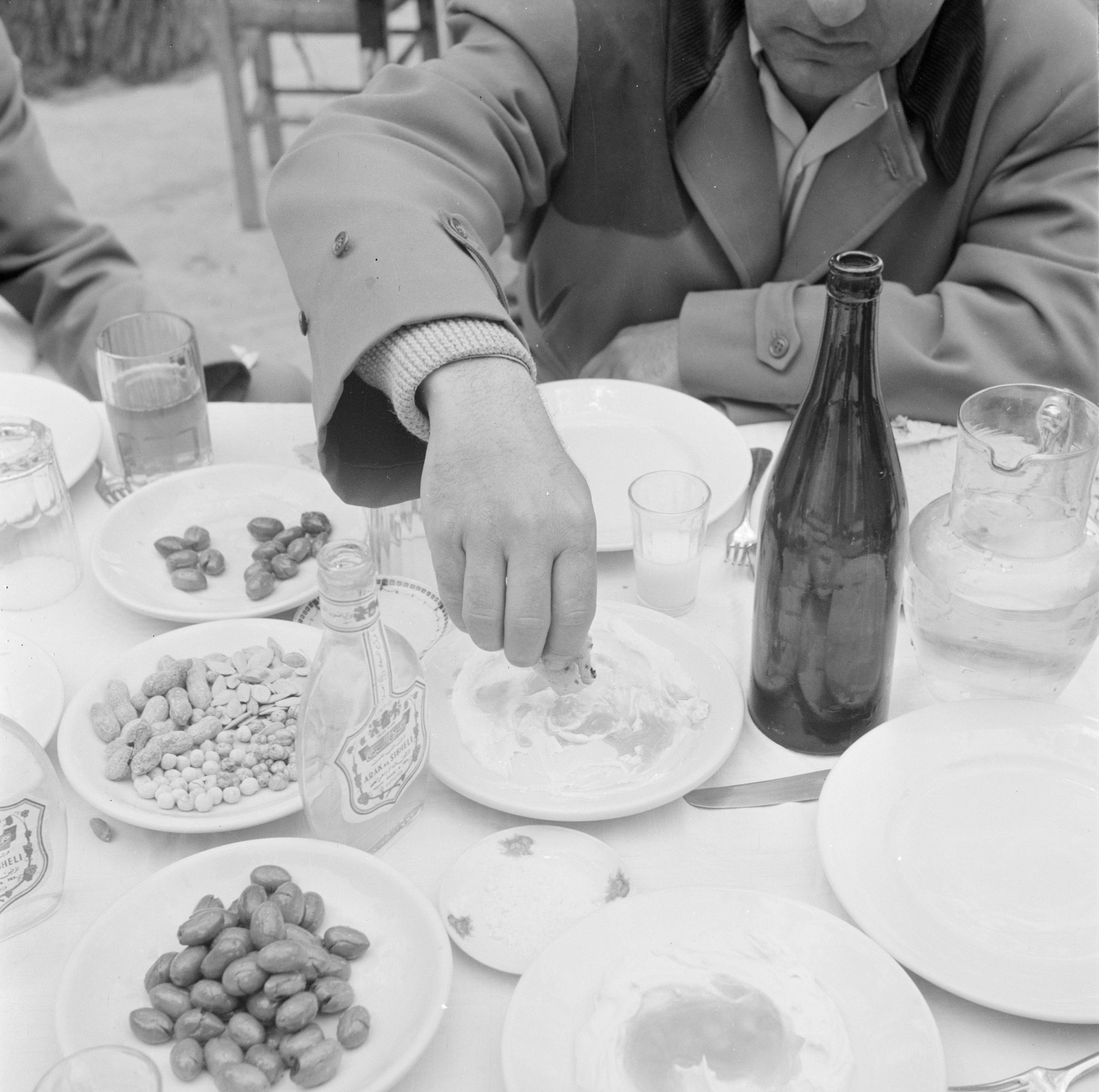
Mezze, taken at a restaurant in Beirut, Lebanon, 1950. A bottle of arak can be seen on the table.

The custom of serving small dishes with alcohol dates back to medieval times. The meze tradition began in the Byzantine Empire and developed in Ottoman Greek houses and tavernes.

In addition, Naql (نقل), a concept mentioned in medieval Arabic texts, referred to small dishes served with alcohol like salted toasted almonds. Food historian Nawal Nasrallah considers them to be comparable to mezze.

== Common dishes ==
Common features of meze include cubes of cheese, olives, grilled meats, or snacks like stuffed leaves, dolma, salads like tabbouleh, or dips like hummus.

Seafood dishes such as grilled octopus may be included, along with salads, sliced hard-boiled eggs, garlic bread, kalamata olives, fava spread, fried vegetables, melitzanosalata (eggplant salad), taramosalata, fried or grilled cheeses called saganaki, and sheep, goat, or cow cheeses.

Popular meze dishes include the following:

| Levantine | Greek | Turkish | Armenian | Image | Description |
|---|---|---|---|---|---|
| Arayes lahmacun(pronounced lahm biajeen) | | Lahmacun | Lahmajoun, misahats | | Barbecued flatbread filled with lamb meat, onions, tomatoes, and spices |
| Asbe sawda | Sykotákia | Arnavut ciğeri | | | A liver dish |
| Baba ghanoush (Moutabal) | Melitzanosaláta | Patlıcan ezmesi (Babagannuş) | Mutabal | | Mashed eggplant (aubergine) |
| Burek | Bouréki | Börek | Boureg | | Phyllo- or yufka-based filled pastries |
| Wara Enab | Dolmathákia | Sarma (Yaprak sarma) Dolma | Sarma | | Leaves (mostly grape leaves) rolled around a rice-based filling |
| Falafel | Revithokeftédes | Falafel/Felafel | Baklayov kyufta | | A deep-fried ball or patty made from ground chickpeas, fava beans, or both |
| Fasuliya | Gigantes plaki | Fasulye pilaki | Fasoulia | | Beans |
| Fattoush | | Fettuş | | | Salad of vegetables with toasted or fried pieces of pita bread |
| | Fáva Santorínis | | | | Lathyrus clymenum seeds boiled and mashed into paste, with olive oil and chopped onion |
| Ful (Mdammas) | Koukiá | Fava | | | Fava beans mixed with seasonings |
| Hummus | Hoúmous | Humus | Homus | | A dip or spread made from cooked, mashed chickpeas |
| | Kalamarákia tiganitá | Kalamar tava | | | Fried squid (calamari) |
| Khyar Bi Laban | Tzatziki | Cacık (read:jah-juck; soupy or dry variations), Haydari(dry; no cucumber and strained yoghurt) | Jajik | | Cucumber, yogurt, herbs (mostly mint), and seasonings (garlic optional), served thick as a dip in Greece and thin like a cold soup in Turkey and Arabic countries |
| Kibbeh | Koúpes | İçli köfte | Ishli Kyufta | | Meatballs made of bulghur, chopped meat, filled with meat, pine nuts, and spices |
| Kafta / Kufta (Kofta) | Keftédes | Köfte | Kufteh | | Meatballs made of chopped meat, onion, parsley, and spices |
| | | Şiş köfte | | | Kebab-style köfte |
| Kibbeh nayyeh | | Çiğ köfte | Chi Kufte, Hoom Kufteh | | Raw meat dish |
| Tabboule | | Kısır | Eech | | Bulgur salad with finely ground parsley and tomato paste |
| | Kolokythoanthoí gemistoí | Kabak çiçeği dolması | | | Stuffed squash blossom |
| Labaneh | | Labne Süzme Yoğurt | Lebni | | Yoghurt that has been strained to remove most of its whey, resulting in a thicker consistency than unstrained yoghurt (Seasoning such as garlic and herbs are sometimes added) |
| Ijjit kousa | Kolokythokeftédes | Mücver | | | Zucchini fritters |
| | Maintanosaláta | | | | Dip made from finely chopped parsley mixed with olive oil, vinegar, lemon juice, garlic, and a base of either bread or potatoes |
| Muhammara | | Cevizli Acılı Ezme (Acuka) | | | A hot pepper dip with ground walnuts, breadcrumbs, garlic, salt, lemon juice, and olive oil |
| | | Piyaz | | | Salad made from any kind of dry beans with onion, parsley and sumac |
| Salatit Jarjīr | Róka Saláta | Roka Arugula | | | Rocket salad |
| | | Şakşuka | | | Vegetables cooked in olive oil |
| Sikh lahme (for lamb or beef), Shish taouk (for chicken) | Souvlaki | Şiş tavuk Çöp şiş | Shish kebab, Khorovats | | Bite sized meat cubes (lamb is very common), grilled on a skewer over charcoal |
| Sujuk | Soutzoúki | Sucuk | Sojoukh | | Dry, spicy sausage |
| Tabbouleh | | Tabbule or Arap salatası | Tabuleh | | Bulgur, finely chopped parsley, mint, tomato, spring onion, with lemon juice, olive oil and seasonings |
| | Taramosalata | Tarama | | | Dip made from tarama, the salted and cured roe of the cod, carp, or grey mullet (bottarga) mixed with olive oil, lemon juice and a starchy base of bread or potatoes or sometimes almonds |
| Tajin | | | | | Dip made of fish and Tarator (Tahini and lemon) |
| | Gemistá | Dolma | Dolma | | Peppers, eggplants, or courgettes stuffed with rice and meat |

Other meze dishes include cheeses (such as halloumi, labneh, tulum, or shanklish) or meat dishes (like afelia, lountza, or pastirma), fish (like fried whitebait, calamari).

== In regional cuisines ==
In many Muslim-majority countries where the consumption of alcohol is less common because of Islamic dietary laws, meze often manifests as part of the meal structure rather than accompanying spirits.

In Greece, Cyprus, Bulgaria, mezé, mezés or mezédhes (plural) are small dishes, hot or cold, spicy or savory.

=== The Levant ===
In Palestine, Jordan, Syria, Lebanon, and Cyprus, meze is often a meal in its own right. There are vegetarian, meat or fish mezes. Groups of dishes arrive at the table about four or five at a time (usually between five and ten groups). There is a set pattern to the dishes: typically olives, tahini, salad, and yogurt will be followed by dishes with vegetables and eggs, then small meat or fish dishes alongside special accompaniments, and finally more substantial dishes such as whole fish or meat stews and grills. Establishments will offer their own specialties, but the pattern remains the same. Naturally, the dishes served will reflect the seasons. For example, in late autumn, snails will be prominent. As so much food is offered, it is not expected that every dish be finished, but rather shared at will and served at ease. Arak and beer are often drunk with mezze, especially if meats are ordered.

In Palestinian cuisine, mezze typically refers to the sample dishes served at the start of a formal meal. Mezze is also served alongside a nargila. Palestinian ethnographer Tawfiq Canaan described mezze in 1923 as fruits, nuts, and bread that accompany spirits. In Syrian cuisine, mazza is typically only savory.

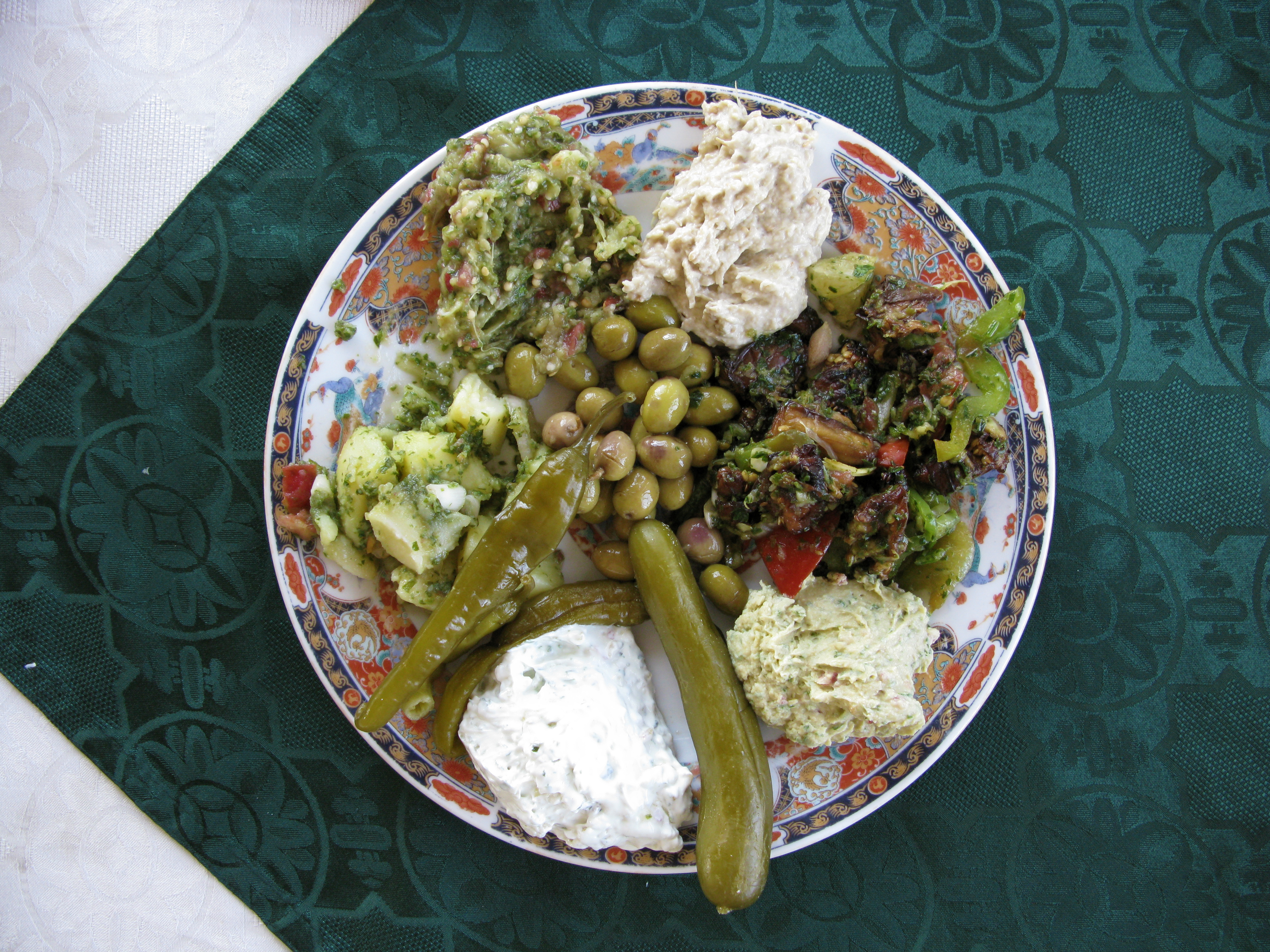
Syrian meze

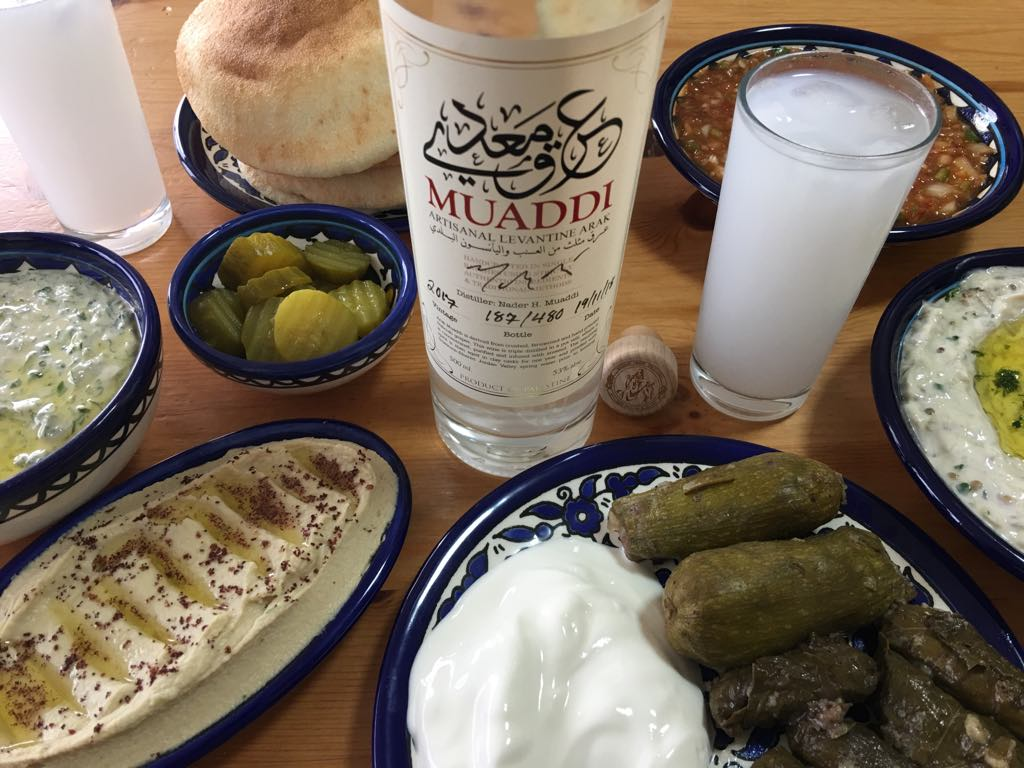
Palestinian meze

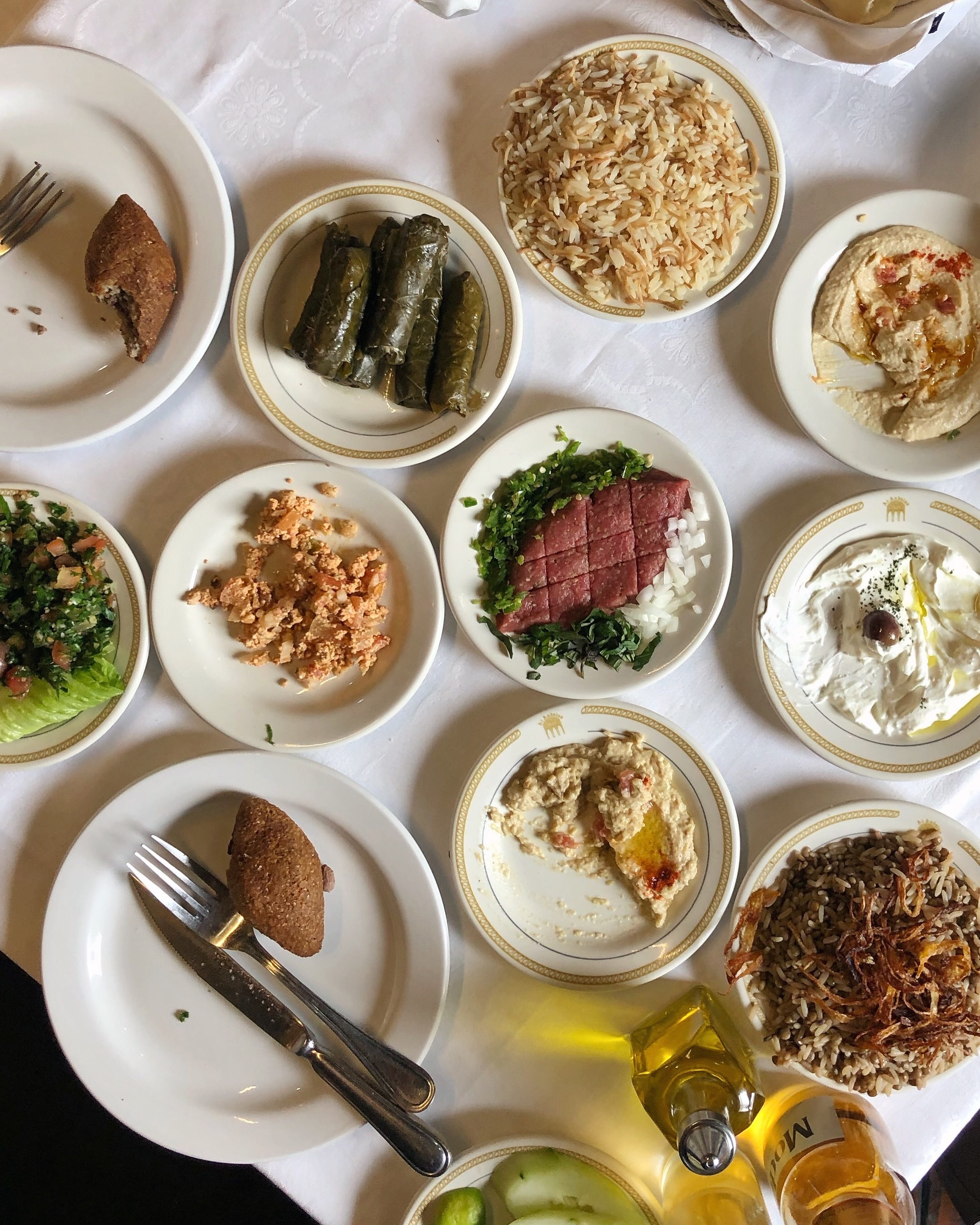
Modern Lebanese meze

=== Turkey ===
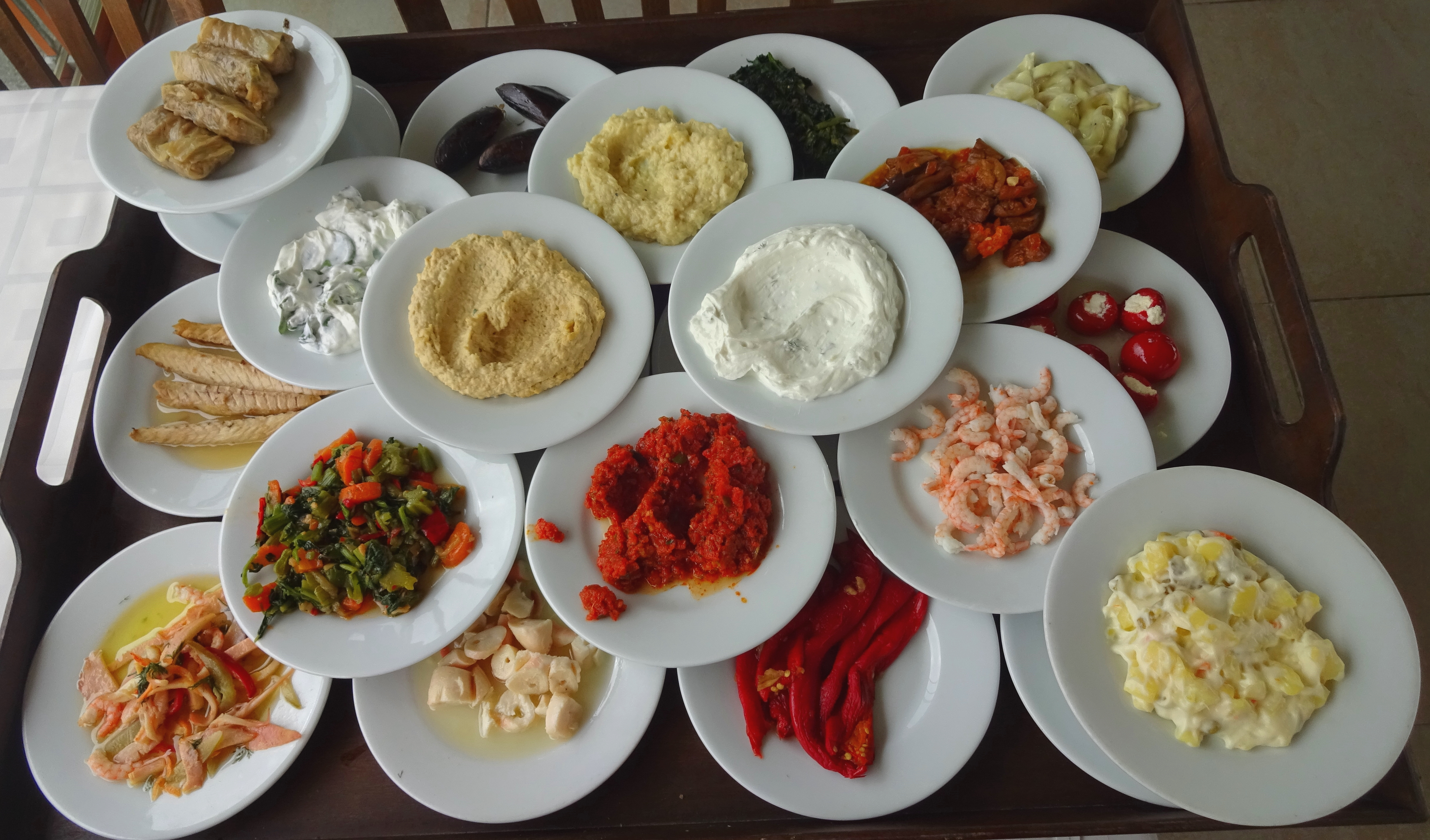
Different meze plates from Turkey

In Turkey, meze often consist of beyaz peynir ('white cheese'), kavun (sliced ripe melon), acılı ezme (hot pepper paste, often with walnuts), haydari (thick strained yogurt with herbs), patlıcan salatası (cold eggplant salad), beyin salatası (brain salad), kalamar tava (fried calamari), midye dolma and midye tava (stuffed or fried mussels), enginar (artichokes), cacık (yogurt with cucumber and garlic), pilaki (foods cooked in a special sauce), dolma or sarma (rice-stuffed vine leaves or other stuffed vegetables, such as bell peppers), Arnavut ciğeri (a liver dish, served cold), octopus salad, and çiğ köfte (raw meatballs with bulgur). A selection of mezes can be served as appetizers in a multi-course dinner, or as snacks accompanying drinks such as rakı.

=== The Balkans ===
In Southeast Europe, meze is very similar to an Italian antipasto in that cured cold-cuts, cheese and salads are dominant and cooked foods are not included. In Greece, Albania, Serbia, Croatia, Bosnia, and Montenegro, it includes hard or creamy cheeses, kajmak (clotted cream) or smetana cream, salami, ham, and other forms of suho/suvo meso (cured pork or beef), kulen (paprika flavoured, cured sausage), cured bacon, ajvar, and various savory pastries. For Muslims, meze replaces pork products with sudžuk (dry, spicy sausage) and the pastirma-like cured beef suho meso.

In southern Croatia, Herzegovina, and Montenegro, cured meat such as pršut and panceta and regional products like olives are common. Albanian-style meze platters typically include prosciutto ham, salami, and brined cheese, accompanied with roasted bell peppers (capsicum) or green olives marinated in olive oil with garlic. In Bulgaria, popular mezes are lukanka (a spicy sausage), soujouk (a dry and spicy sausage) and sirene (a white brine cheese). The Bulgarian-made shopska salad is also a very popular meze. It is made with tomatoes, cucumbers, onion, peppers, and sirene. Ajvar and pindjur are popular mezes in North Macedonia. In Romania, mezelic means a quick appetizer and includes zacuscă, cheeses, and salamis, often accompanied by tuică.

In Greece, meze is commonly served as a plate of snacks to accompany drinks such as ouzo and tsipouro.

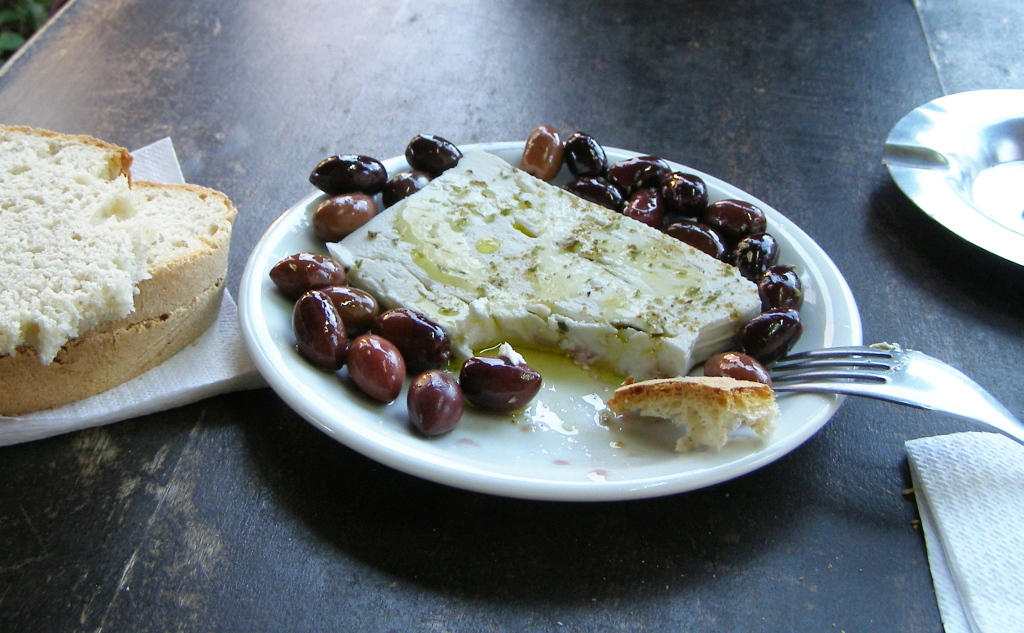
Simple Greek meze: cheese and olives (feta cheese drizzled with olive oil and sprinkled with oregano, served with kalamata olives and bread)

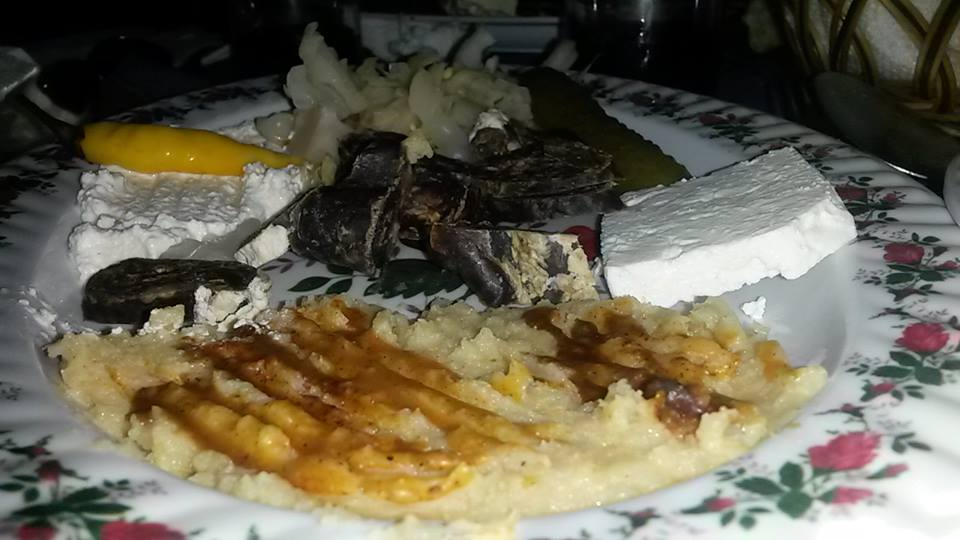
Meze plate in Albania

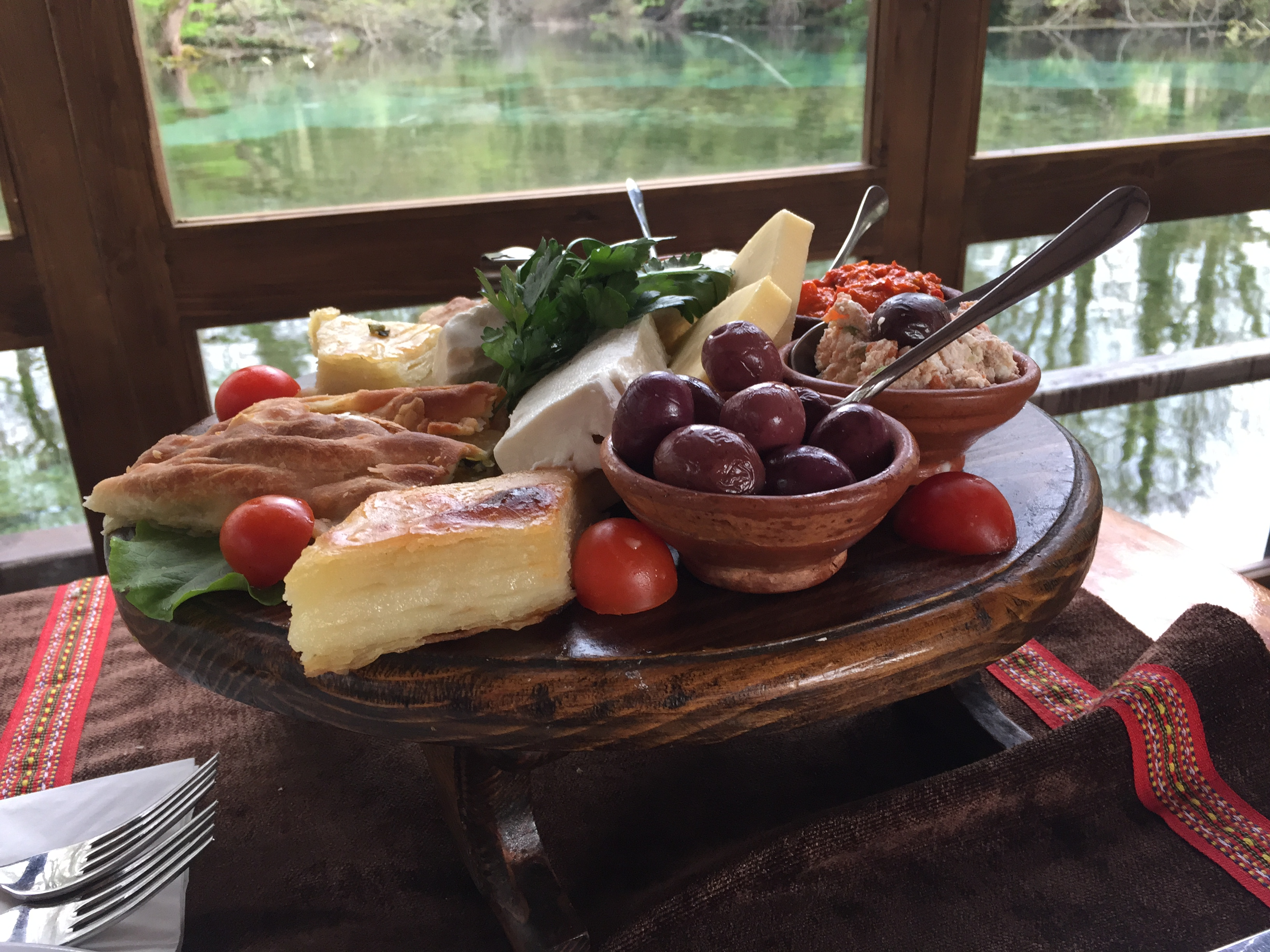
Macedonian mezze

== See also ==
- Food and wine matching
- List of hors d'oeuvre
- Aahaan kap klaem – Thai term for food consumed with alcohol
- Anju (food) – Korean term for food eaten with alcohol
- Antipasti – First course of a formal Italian meal
- Banchan – Korean side dishes
- Dim sum – Chinese cuisine
- Pusas – Traditional appetiser or snack eaten with alcohol in Sabah, Malaysia
- Sakana – Japanese snacks, eaten with alcohol
- Smörgåsbord – Buffet-style meal of Swedish origin
- Tapas – Appetiser or snack in Spanish and international cuisine
- Thali – Indian-style meal made up of various dishes served on a platter
- Zakuski – Russian term for appetizers served before meals

== Bibliography ==
- Wright, Clifford A. (2001). Mediterranean vegetables: a cook's ABC of vegetables and their preparation in Spain, France, Italy, Greece, Turkey, the Middle East, and north Africa with more than 200 authentic recipes for the home cook (Illustrated ed.). Harvard Common Press. ISBN 9781558321960.
