= Çiğ köfte =

Middle Eastern raw meatball dish

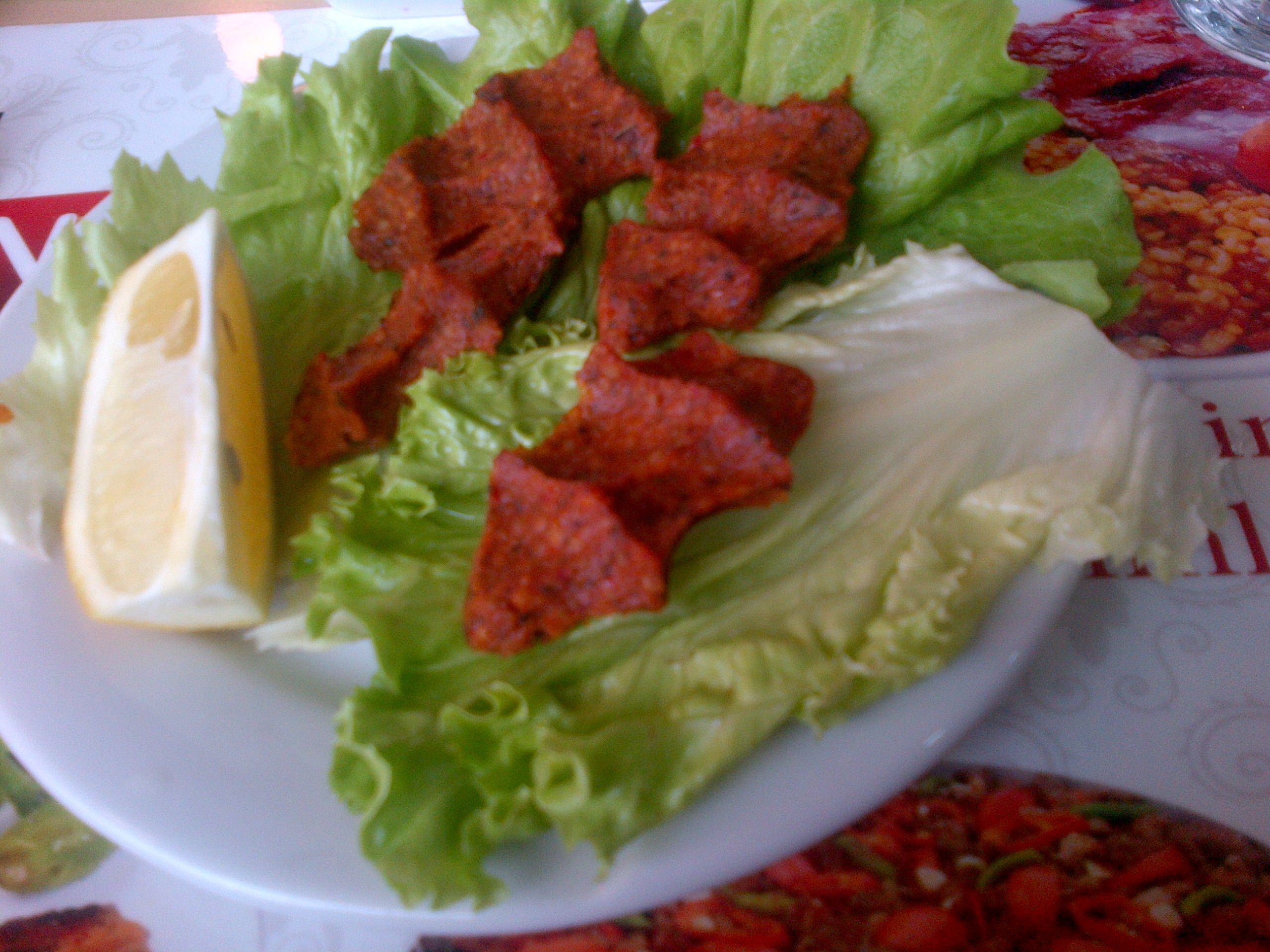
- Çiğ köfte meal from Turkey
- Course: Appetizer
- Region or state: Şanlıurfa, Southeastern Anatolia
- Serving temperature: room temperature
- Main ingredients: Raw meat, bulgur, onion, tomato paste, hot red pepper paste, Urfa biber
- Ingredients generally used: Fresh mint, parsley, spices, lemon, olive oil
- Variations: Vegetarian, eggs
- Similar dishes: Kibbeh nayyeh, Kibbeh, Eetch, Kısır
- Other information: Lettuce or wrapped within tortilla with fresh lemon juice or pomegranate sauce

Çiğ köfte (Turkish pronunciation: [tʃiː cœfte]) or chee kofta is a kofta dish that is a regional specialty of southeastern Turkey in Urfa. The dish is served as an appetizer or meze.

Çiğ köfte is common to both Turkish and Armenian cuisine.

Traditionally made with raw meat, there are vegetarian variations made with bulgur, and in Urfa, a local meatless version is made with scrambled eggs. In Şanlıurfa province, locally prepared batches are sold by street vendors.

In 2008, public sales of çiğ köfte with raw meat were banned by the Health Ministry of Turkey due to health hazards, especially taeniasis, thus leaving only plant-based versions in shops and restaurants.

== Etymology ==
In Turkish, çiğ means "raw" and köfte means meatball. The word köfte derives from Persian, ultimately from the Proto-Indo-European root "*(s)kop–" (grind, pound, beaten).

== Preparation ==
Bulgur is kneaded with chopped onion and water until it softens. Ground beef or lamb, tomato paste and chopped parsley are then added and mixed until evenly dispersed. The mixture is subsequently kneaded, with seasonings such as cinnamon, cumin, lemon juice and isot (or ground chilli flakes) added progressively; experienced makers continually turn and fold the mixture and may periodically add more isot, parsley or lemon juice to achieve as smooth a consistency as possible. It is commonly served by placing portions on lettuce leaves and finishing with a squeeze of lemon (and additional isot, if desired).

=== Meat differences ===
In the beef variant, ground beef is used. Tendons and fat are removed before grinding the beef. High-quality beef is required, since it is served raw.

Since lamb is considered a "clean meat", it is often used for çiğ köfte instead of beef. Both Armenians and Turks use çiğ köfte as a meze, served almost cold. The raw meatball, or kofta, is not kept overnight and is reserved for special occasions. The lamb used must be deboned and trimmed of gristle and fat before it is prepared. The lamb is supposed to be butchered, bought, and prepared the very same day to ensure freshness.

With either meat, finely ground bulgur (durum and other wheat) is required. Other ingredients are mild onions, scallions, parsley, and usually green pepper. Variants of the dish may use mint leaves. When served, it may be gathered into balls, or in one piece. Crackers or pita bread are sometimes used to consume it.

Ghillie Basan wrote that kibbeh nayyeh is similar to çiğ köfte in that both are typically kneaded with seasonings and served uncooked, often with lettuce leaves.

== Regions ==
=== Turkey ===
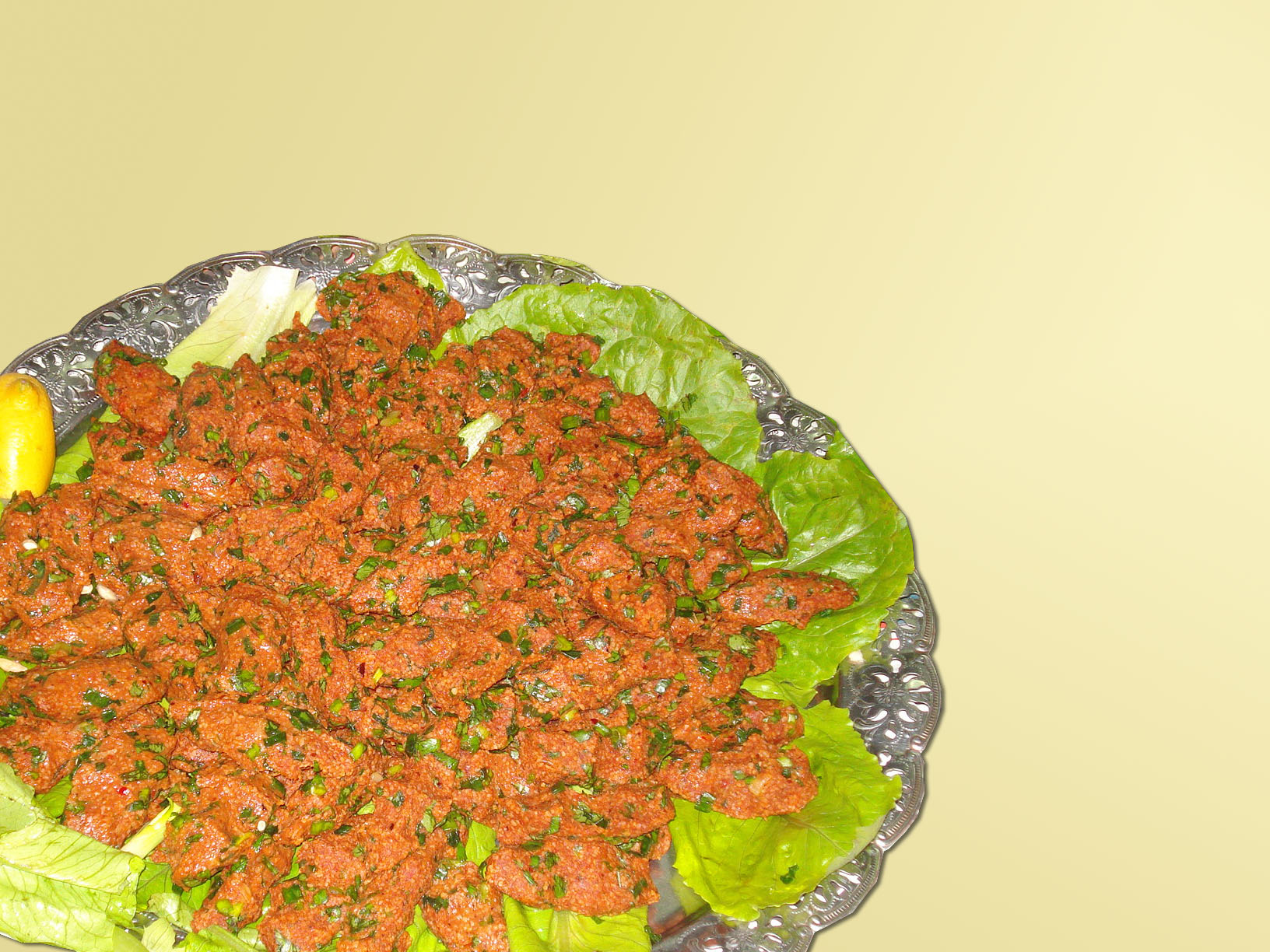
Şanlıurfa version

The dish is often associated with Şanlıurfa province, where it is a popular street food, but it is a popular appetizer all over Turkey. The ingredients are all raw and traditionally include ground meat, bulgur, tomato paste, fresh onion, garlic and other spices for flavoring such as "isot" and black pepper. A favorite way of eating çiğ köfte is rolled in a lettuce leaf, accompanied by good quantities of ayran to counter-act the burning sensation that this very spicy food will give.

A vegetarian version of çiğ köfte may also be made with only bulgur grains. The preparation is similar to the versions that include meat, and some cooks also add pomegranate molasses. Depending on the cook's preferences, spices like cumin may be used instead of isot in the preparation of vegetarian versions. Another vegetarian variation from Urfa is made with scrambled eggs.

Although the traditional recipe requires minced raw meat, the version in Turkey consumed as fast-food (through small franchise shops in every neighborhood of Turkey) must be meatless by law due to hygienic necessities. Therefore, çiğ köfte is, unless specifically made, vegan in Turkey. Meat is replaced by ground walnuts, hazelnuts and potato.

=== Armenia ===
Chi kofte is considered a delicacy in Armenian culture and is normally prepared on special occasions, especially during holidays. There are many varieties of chi kofte among Armenian families depending on the historic region they are from and their personal preferences. For example, some may use more or less bulgur, and some may use more or less pepper paste depending on their desired spiciness.

Traditional Armenian chi kofte is made in two varieties, either in loose meatball form in the shape of a small egg, or flattened on a plate with olive oil and minced green onions, similar to kibbeh nayyeh. However, unlike Levantine Arabs, eating chi kofte with bread is not common among Armenians.

A vegetarian variation with cooked red lentils also exists which is shaped very similarly to chi kofte and with a similar texture. Although it is prepared throughout the year, it is particularly popular during Lent in accordance with the diet restrictions of the Armenian Apostolic Church.

=== United States ===
Chi kofte was introduced in the United States by Armenian immigrants, and is commonly referred to as Armenian beef tartare.

== Safety ==
Concerns have been expressed that the raw meat variety of the dish is unsafe to consume. A 2003 research paper on 50 çiğ köfte samples from Ankara, Turkey found that the dish had unsafe levels of microorganisms. A 2012 research paper on 100 samples from Bursa, Turkey reached a similar conclusion, and found salmonella present in 2% of its samples.

== See also ==
- Kibbeh nayyeh
- Kısır
- List of meatball dishes
- List of meat dishes
