= Afelia =

Cypriot pork dish

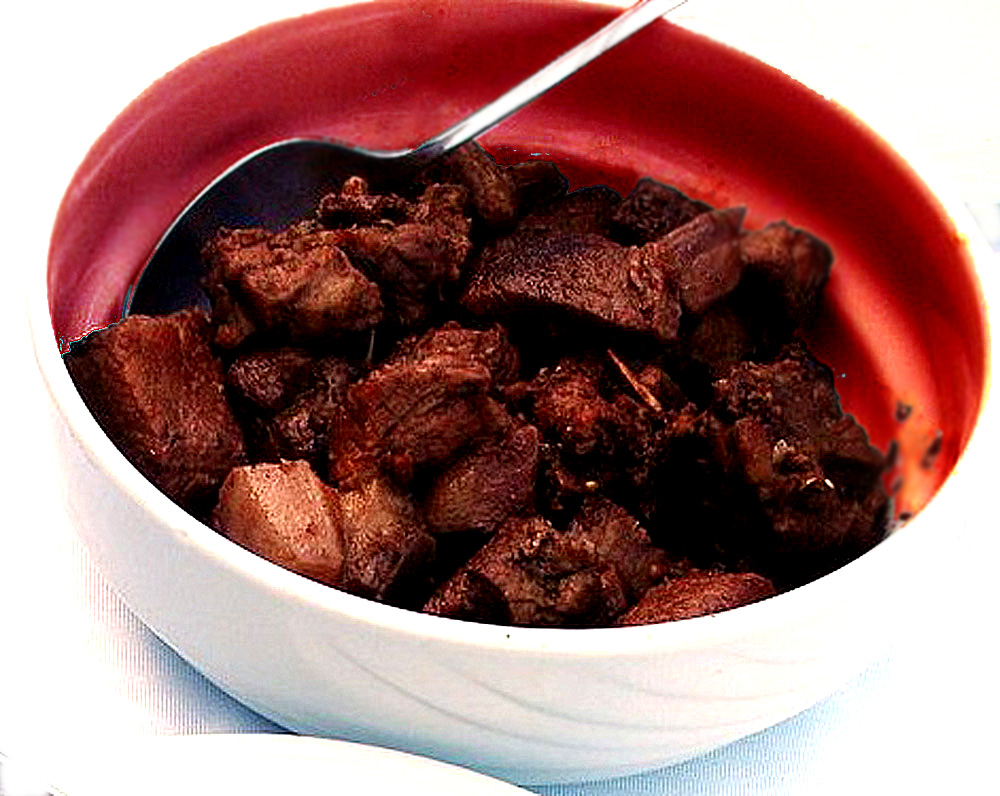
Afelia dish

Afelia (Greek: αφέλια) is a traditional Cypriot pork dish. It is pork marinated and cooked in red wine with coarsely crushed coriander seed. In order to prepare the dish, ingredients like salt, pepper, oil etc. are included. During the British era (from 1878) the use of butter instead of oil was noted. Afelia is usually served with potato dish, bulgur and yogurt.

== See also ==
- List of pork dishes
