= Urfa biber =

Dried chili pepper from Turkey

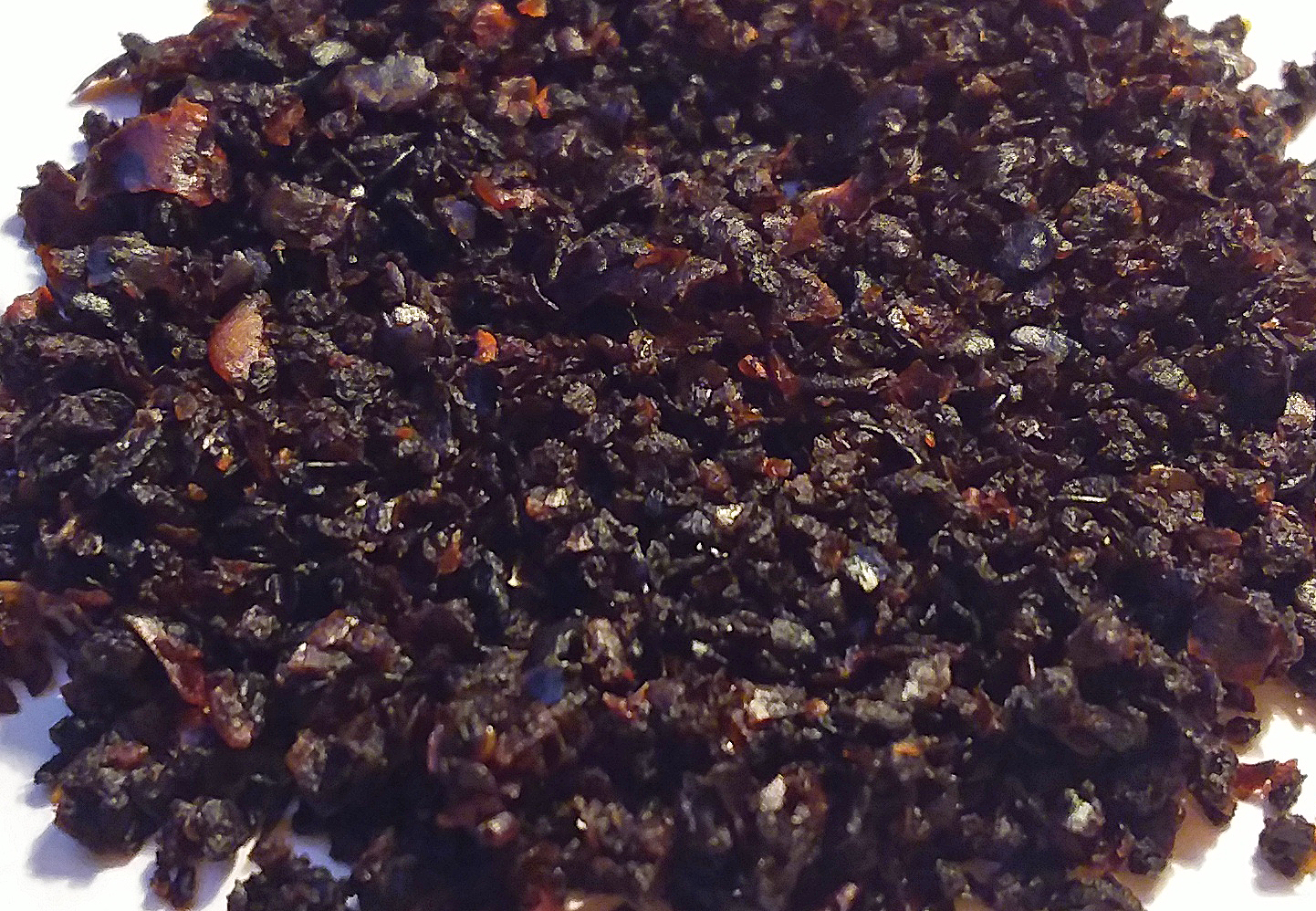
- Flaked Urfa biber
- Genus: Capsicum
- Species: Capsicum annuum
- Origin: Urfa, Turkey
- Heat: Medium
- Scoville scale: 7,500 SHU

Urfa biber (also known as isot pepper, /ɪˈsoʊt/) is a spice prepared from landrace Capsicum annuum in the Urfa region of Turkey. It is often described as having a smoky, raisin-like taste. Urfa biber is technically a red (chili) pepper, ripening to a dark maroon on the plant. The peppers go through a two-part process, where they are sun-dried during the day and wrapped tightly at night. The night process is called 'sweating', and works to infuse the dried flesh with the remaining moisture of the pepper. The result is an appearance ranging from deep purple to a dark, purplish black. Urfa biber is less spicy than many other chili peppers, but provides a more lasting build of heat.

The pungency of the urfa biber is 7,500 SHU on the Scoville scale.

The Urfa pepper is a protected geographic indication in Turkey, with the official name "Urfa isot pepper" (Urfa isot biberi).

== Etymology ==
According to the lexicographer Sevan Nişanyan, the name isot evolved from ısı ot (lit. 'hot weed'), meaning "pepper" in regional Turkish. The term ısı ot (Ottoman Turkish: ایصی اوت) has been attested in Turkish in multiple sources since late 15th century. In Hamit Zübeyir Koşay and İshak Işıtman's book from 1932, Anadilden Derlemeler, this term was included as ısıot and isot.

== Production ==
The harvesting and processing of Urfa peppers takes place from August to October. Workers are exposed to extreme heat of up to 40-50 °C. Extreme heat adversely affects the process.

Isot can be produced in two ways: traditional and industrial (or fabricated). The two methods result in products with significantly different colors; the fabricated isot has a browner color, with fewer carotenoids, than the traditional kind.

In traditional isot production, workers remove the stems and clean the seeds and then cut the peppers into 2 or 3 slices. Then the peppers are left out in the sun to dry for about a week, making sure that none are overlapping. Once finished, the peppers are kept out in the sun in tightly sealed bags in a process known as "sweating". Once per day, workers turn the bags upside down so both sides get sunlight. To keep the bags warm during the night, they are covered with cloths. This "sweating" is what gives the peppers the desired dark red or purplish color. Once the peppers have darkened enough, which usually takes about a week, they are taken out of the bags and spread out on the floor to sun-dry again. Once this final drying is finished, the peppers are usually processed immediately. Producers grind them up and add a small amount of salt, which prevents the flakes from forming large clumps. Some olive oil may also be added at this stage. The crushed peppers are typically sold to consumers about 3 to 5 days after grinding.

In fabricated isot production, which is faster than the traditional method, the peppers are cut into slices and then either sun-dried or heated in an oven to get down to 15% humidity. They are then ground up. Workers then add water to increase their moisture content to 25-27%, and then the crushed peppers are friction-heated to 60-65 °C by being passed through a screw-shaped helix. Then they are kept in wooden containers for 30 to 36 hours while being heated up to 80-90 °C. This process, known as "kneading", simulates the traditional "sweating" process by causing the peppers to acquire a darker color.

As an alternative to crushing, the peppers can be pickled. Pickled Urfa biber is not typically found outside of Turkey because it is not exported.

== Flavor ==
The sun-drying process gives Urfa biber a distinct smoky flavor, although it is not smoked. The presence of tannins gives it a complex flavor, reminiscent of wine, tobacco or chocolate. It is somewhat, but not wholly, sweet, and it also has heat and acidity.

== Culinary use ==
The finished product is used to add flavor and color to a wide range of dishes, including local specialties like çiğ köfte and lahmacun. It is often combined with cumin, paprika, sesame seeds, or onion. It is traditionally used in Turkey in meat and savoury foods.

== History ==
The Syrian Civil War caused export of the popular Aleppo pepper to drop dramatically. As a result, Urfa biber gained international popularity during the 2010s as a substitute.
