= Haydari =

Turkish yogurt dish

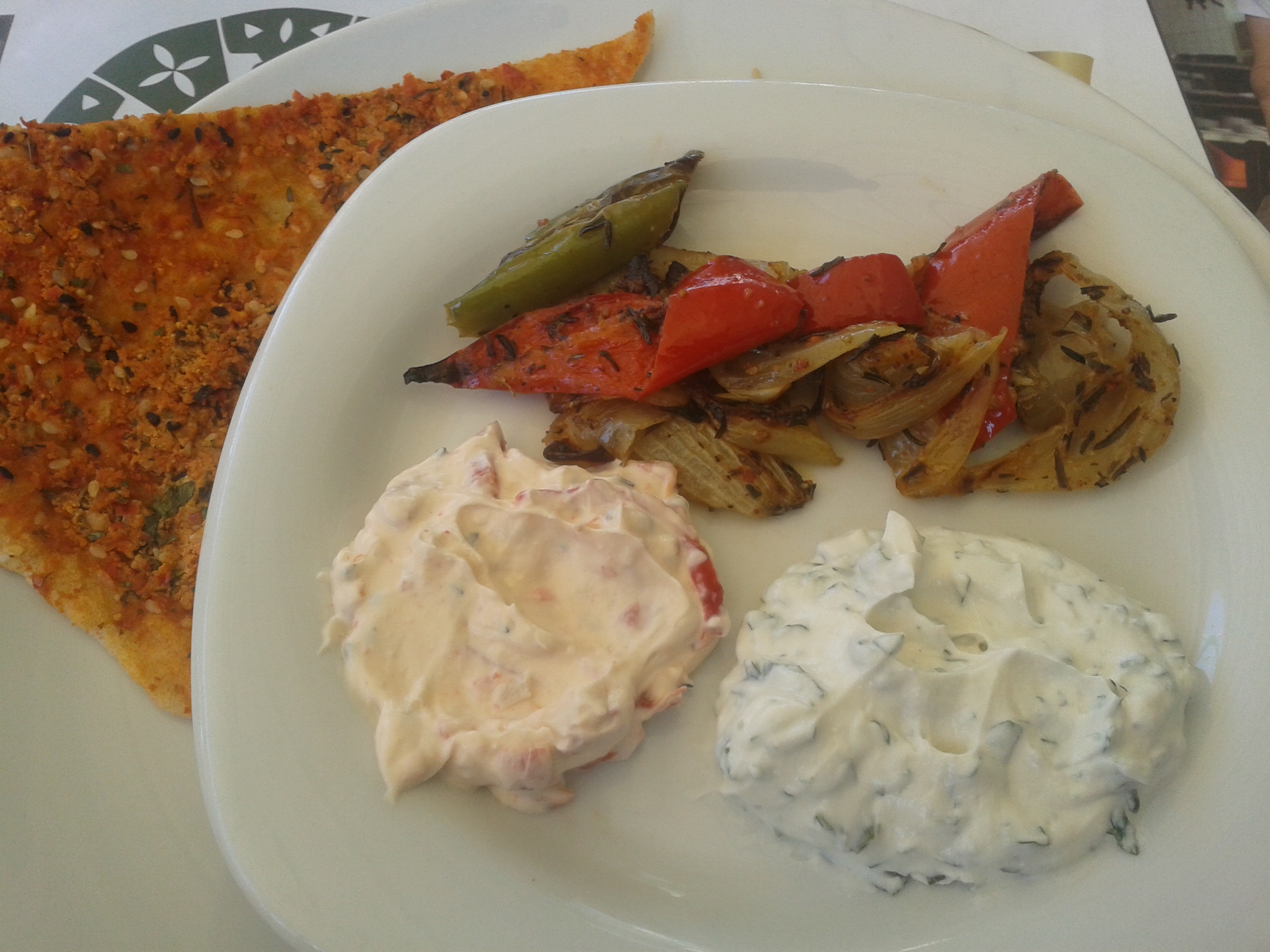
- Haydari served as a small plate meze appetizer with katıklı ekmek at a restaurant in Ankara
- Type: Meze
- Main ingredients: Yogurt
- Ingredients generally used: Herbs and spices
- Similar dishes: Cacık

Haydari is a type of yogurt dish similar to a thick cacık, made from certain herbs and spices, combined with garlic and yogurt. It differs from cacık in that the recipe contains no cucumber and calls for strained yogurt or labne. It is served purely as a meze, being more pungently appetizing - by virtue of being saltier, more acidic and of a thicker consistency - than cacık.

== See also ==
- List of dips
- List of hors d'oeuvre
- List of yogurt-based dishes and beverages
- List of dairy products
- Milk salad
- Tarator
- Qatiq
- Raita
- Cold borscht
