= Tabbouleh =

Levantine dish of parsley and bulgur

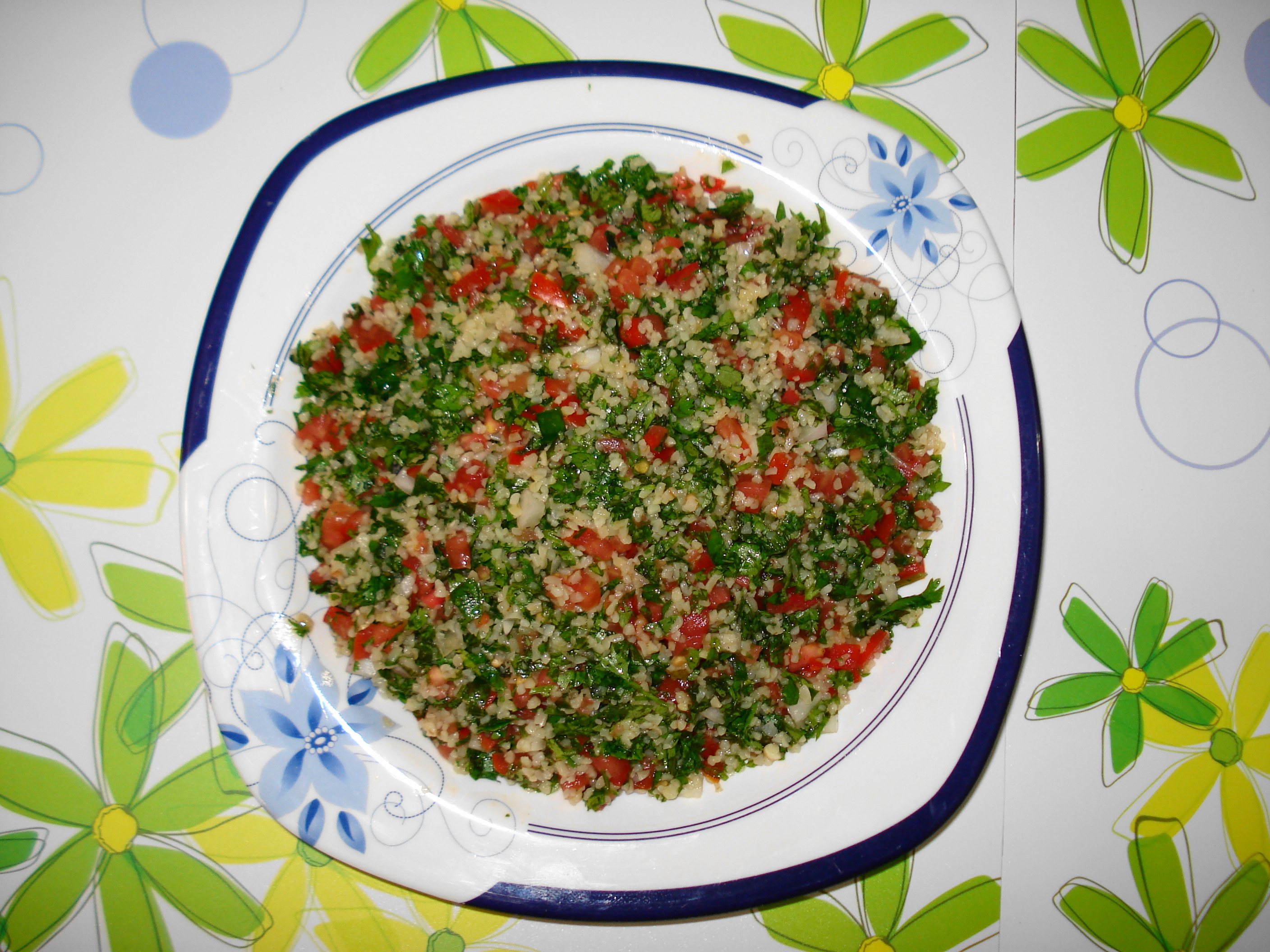
- Type: Salad
- Course: Appetizer
- Place of origin: Lebanon and Syria
- Region or state: Eastern Mediterranean
- Serving temperature: Cold
- Main ingredients: Parsley, tomato, bulgur, onion, olive oil, lemon juice, salt
- Variations: Pomegranate seeds instead of tomato

Tabbouleh (Arabic: تَبّولَة, romanized: tabbūla), also transcribed tabouleh, tabbouli, tabouli, or taboulah, is a Levantine salad of finely chopped parsley, bulgur, tomato, mint, and onion, seasoned with olive oil, lemon juice, salt and sometimes sweet pepper. Some variations add lettuce, or use semolina instead of bulgur.

Tabbouleh is traditionally served as part of a mezze in the Eastern Mediterranean and the Arab world. Like hummus, baba ghanoush, pita bread, and other elements of Arab cuisine, tabbouleh has become a popular food in the United States.

== Etymology ==
The Levantine Arabic tabbūle is derived from the Arabic word tābil from the Aramaic root word t-b-l 'seasoning' or more literally "dip". Use of the word in English first appeared in the 1950s.

== History ==
Originally from the mountains of Lebanon and Syria, tabbouleh has become one of the most popular salads in the Middle East. The salamouni wheat variety cultivated in the Beqaa Valley is considered as particularly well-suited for making bulgur, a basic ingredient of tabbouleh. In Lebanon, the Lebanese National Tabbouleh Day is a yearly festivity day dedicated to Tabbouleh. Since 2001, it is celebrated the first Saturday of the month of July.

Tabbouleh made by Syrian Jews uses bulgur as the main ingredient, rather than parsley, this variety was introduced by them to Israel and into the US in the 1970s.

== Regional variations ==
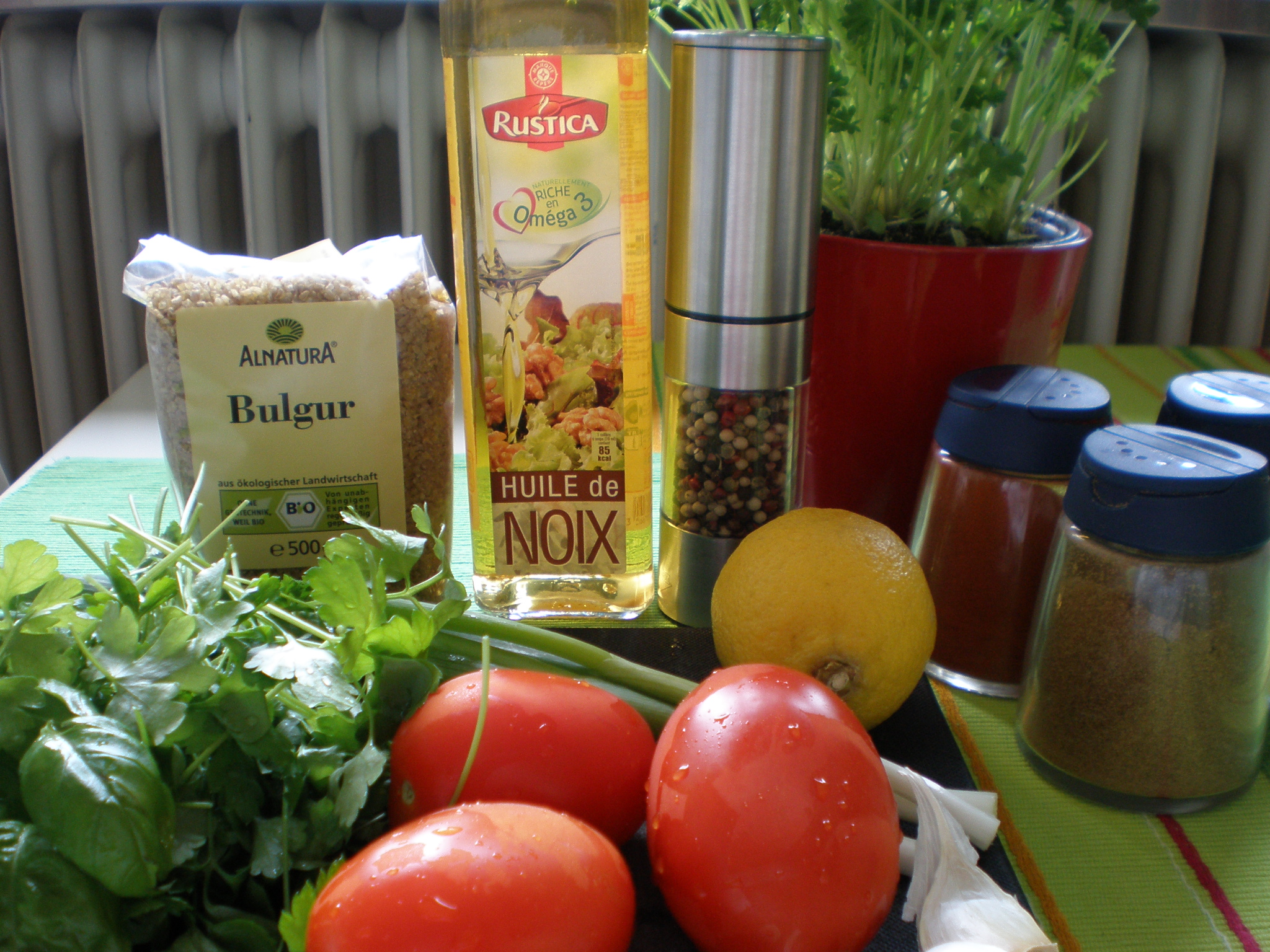
Tabbouleh ingredients

In the Arab world, especially Syria, Lebanon and Palestine, it is usually served as part of a meze. The Syrian and the Lebanese use more parsley than bulgur wheat in their dish. A Turkish variation of the dish known as kısır, and a similar Armenian dish known as eetch use far more bulgur than parsley. Another ancient variant is called terchots. In the Dominican Republic, a local version introduced by Syrian and Lebanese immigrants is called Tipile.

Traditional Levantine tabbouleh has more herbs (mainly parsley) than bulgur, whereas western adaptations contain more bulgur than parsley. The bulgur-heavy variety is widely popular in Israel. Michael Solomonov described Palestinian-made tabbouleh as "80 percent parsley."

== Retail sales ==
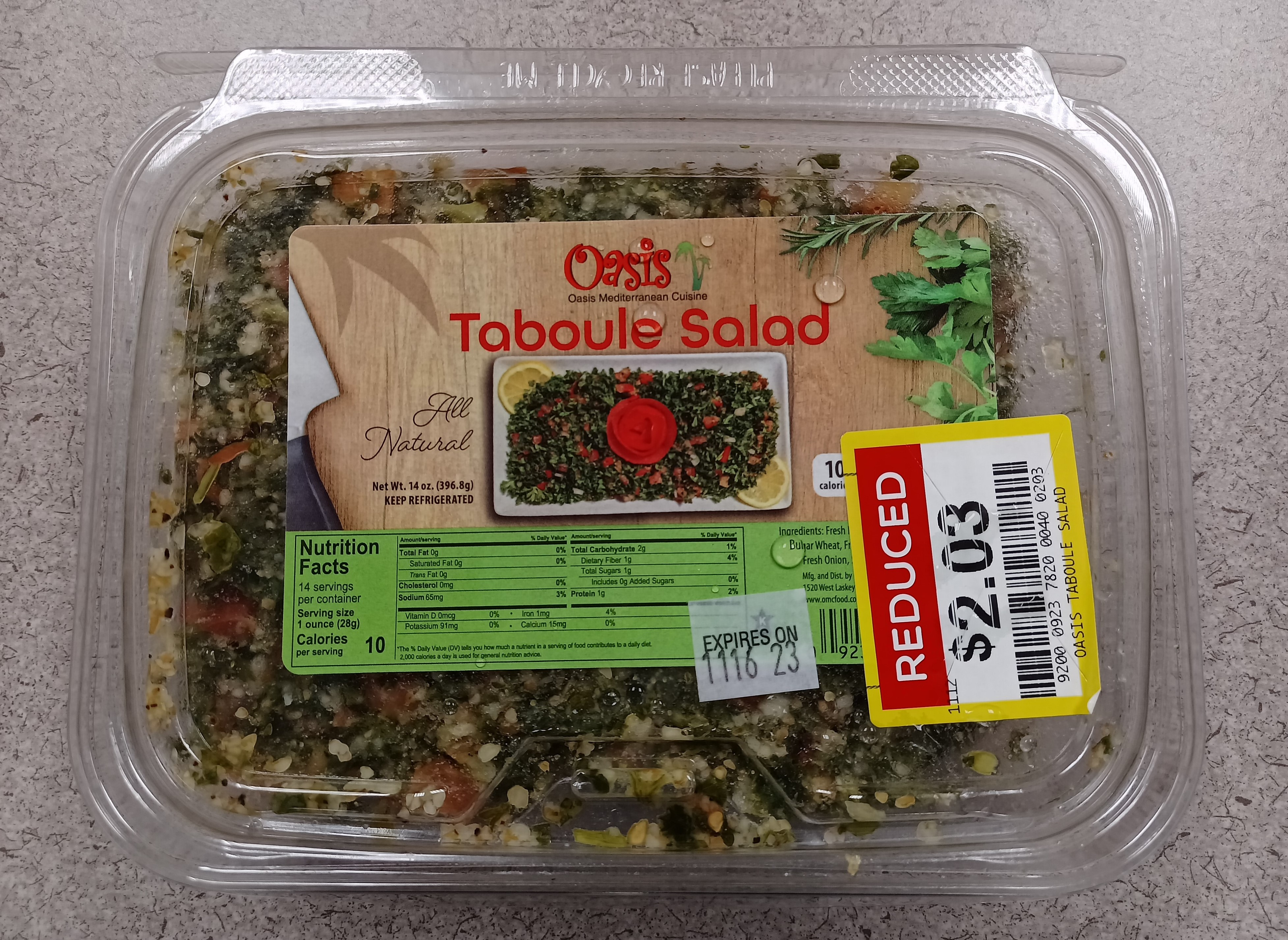
A package of tabbouleh

Several manufacturers make tabbouleh for sale in supermarkets.

== See also ==
- List of salads
- List of vegetable dishes
- Kısır
- Eetch
