= Aleppo pepper =

Dried chili pepper from Syria and Turkey

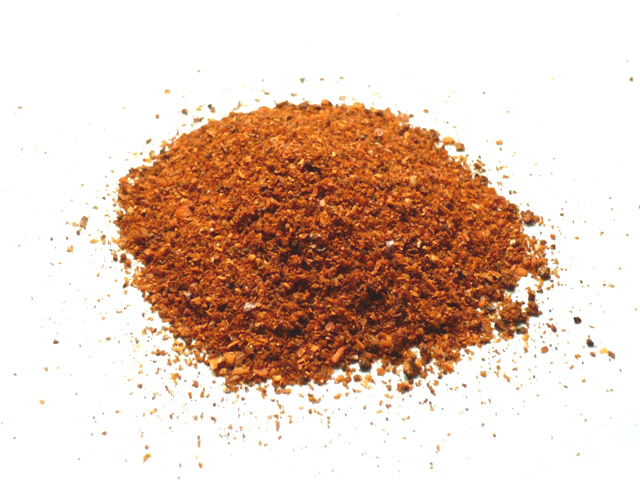
- Aleppo pepper, in its typical processed form
- Species: Capsicum annuum
- Origin: South America
- Heat: Hot
- Scoville scale: 10,000 SHU

The Aleppo pepper (Arabic: فلفل حلبي, ALA-LC: fulful Ḥalabī; Turkish: Halep biberi) is a moderately spicy variety of Capsicum annuum used as a spice, particularly in Middle Eastern, Turkish, and Mediterranean cuisine. Also known as the Halaby pepper, its pods are ripened to a burgundy color, then semi-dried, de-seeded, and crushed or coarsely ground.

The pepper is named after Aleppo, a long-inhabited city along the Silk Road in northern Syria, where it is still grown. Chiles originated in South America and were among the New World crops, like potatoes and tomatoes.

Although it is a common condiment, its use in Europe and the United States outside Armenian, Syrian and Turkish immigrant communities was rare until the 21st century, with Los Angeles magazine dating its rise in use among the broader U.S. population to the 1994 edition of The Cooking of the Eastern Mediterranean by Paula Wolfert.

== Characteristics ==
The Aleppo pepper has a moderate heat level of about 10,000 on the Scoville scale, with some fruitiness and mild, cumin-like undertones. Its flavor is similar to the ancho chile, but oilier and slightly salty; salt is often used in the drying process. It is fairly mild, with its heat building slowly, with a fruity, raisin-like flavor. It has also been described as having the flavor of "sweetness, roundness and perfume of the best kind of sundried tomatoes, but with a substantial kick behind it". Some renowned chefs prefer Aleppo pepper for its "fruity and bright qualities."

== Uses ==
The most common use is in the form of crushed flakes, which are typically slightly milder and oilier than conventional crushed red pepper, with a hint of saltiness and a slightly raisin-like flavor. Unlike crushed red pepper, the flakes contain no inner flesh or seeds, contributing to the mildness. Crushed Aleppo pepper can be used as a substitute for crushed red pepper or paprika.

The spice is a common ingredient in some of the dishes that comprise a meze.

== See also ==
- List of Capsicum cultivars
- Urfa biber
