= Fava (Turkish dish) =

Mediterranean dish

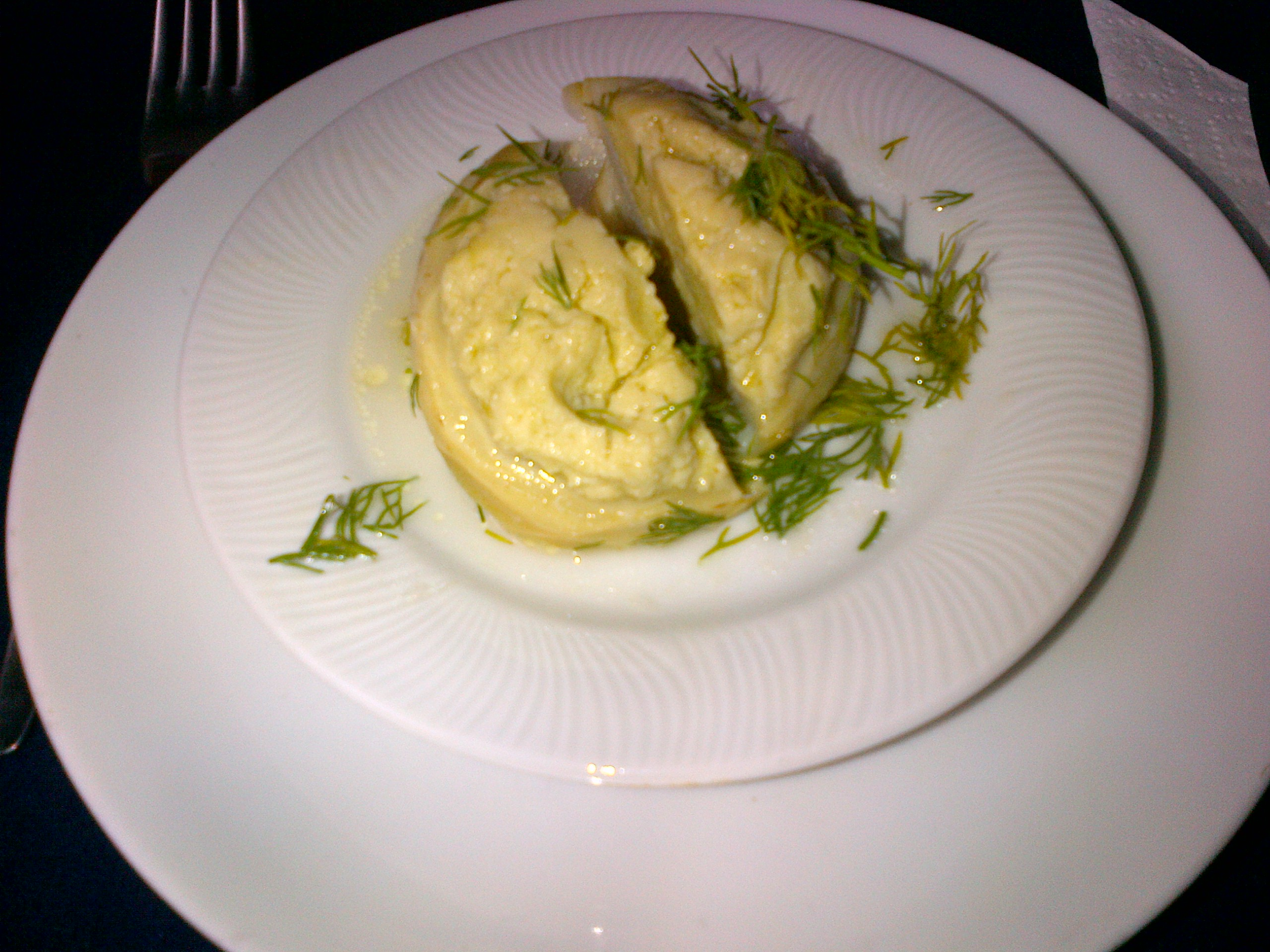
- Alternative names: Bakla ezmesi
- Course: Meze
- Place of origin: Turkey
- Serving temperature: Room temperature (cold)
- Main ingredients: Favas

Fava, also known as bakla ezmesi, is a traditional Turkish dish made of dried fava beans (broad beans, called bakla in Turkish), which are soaked and dehulled, leaving the deeper green split inner seeds. These are boiled, typically with onion, until very soft, mixed with salt, pepper, sugar, lemon juice and olive oil, and pureed. The resulting paste is chilled until it sets and can be cut into cubes. This dish is served cold, sprinkled with olive oil and chopped dill.

Fava originated in Byzantine cuisine; it was widely served in tavernes.

== See also ==
- Fava (Greek dish)
