= Ghillie Basan =

British writer

Ghillie Başan (born 30 August 1962) is a Scottish-based food and travel writer, cook and workshop host. Her books have been nominated for the Glenfiddich, Guild of Food Writers’ and Le Cordon Bleu awards.

== Biography ==
Brought up in Kenya, where her parents were doctors, Basan was sent to boarding school in Scotland, from where she entered the University of Edinburgh to study languages. Once at the university, she changed her course from languages to social anthropology.

Basan met her husband in Turkey, and they moved to live in the United States for two years before returning to Scotland. Their first book, Classic Turkish Cookery, was nominated for two awards and gained them a weekly slot on the Sunday Herald and a contract for their second book, The Middle Eastern Kitchen. The couple are no longer together, and she is raising her two children, Yazzie and Zeki alone.

== Career ==
Basan has written over 40 books and her articles have appeared in the Sunday Herald, Scotland on Sunday, BBC Good Food magazine, TasteTurkey and Today’s Diet and Nutrition. From her home, she runs cookery workshops and travels widely to research and write her books.

== Books ==
- Classic Turkish Cookery, ISBN 1-86064-011-7
- The Middle Eastern Kitchen, ISBN 1-85626-608-7
- Modern Moroccan, ISBN 1-903141-14-1
- Vietnamese: Fragrant & Exotic, ISBN 1-903141-25-7
- The Food and Cooking of Vietnam and Cambodia, ISBN 0-7548-1577-3
- The Food and Cooking of Malaysia and Singapore, ISBN 978-1903141359
- The Food and Cooking of Indonesia and the Philippines, ISBN 1-903141-35-4
- Turkish Cooking, ISBN 1-903141-39-7
- The Food and Cooking of Turkey, ISBN 978-0-7548-1763-5
- Lebanese Food and Cooking, ISBN 978-1-903141-69-4
- Mezze: Small Plates to Share, ISBN 978-1-84975-935-9
- Tagine, ISBN 978-1-84597-478-7
- Flavours of Morocco, ISBN 978-184597605-7
- Tagines & Couscous, ISBN 1-84597-947-8
- Kebabs & other light grills, ISBN 1-84597-973-7
- Food Lovers' Moroccan, ISBN 978-1-4054-9563-9
- The Complete Book of Turkish Food, ISBN 978-1-84681-176-0
- The Food & Cooking of Cambodia, ISBN 978-1-84476-351-1
- Classic Recipes, Tastes & Traditions of Malaysia and Singapore, ISBN 978-0-7548-1856-4
- The Cooking of Indonesia and the Philippines, ISBN 978-0-7548-1905-9
- The Moon's Our Nearest Neighbour, ISBN 0-7515-3129-4
