= Fava (Greek dish) =

Split pea dish

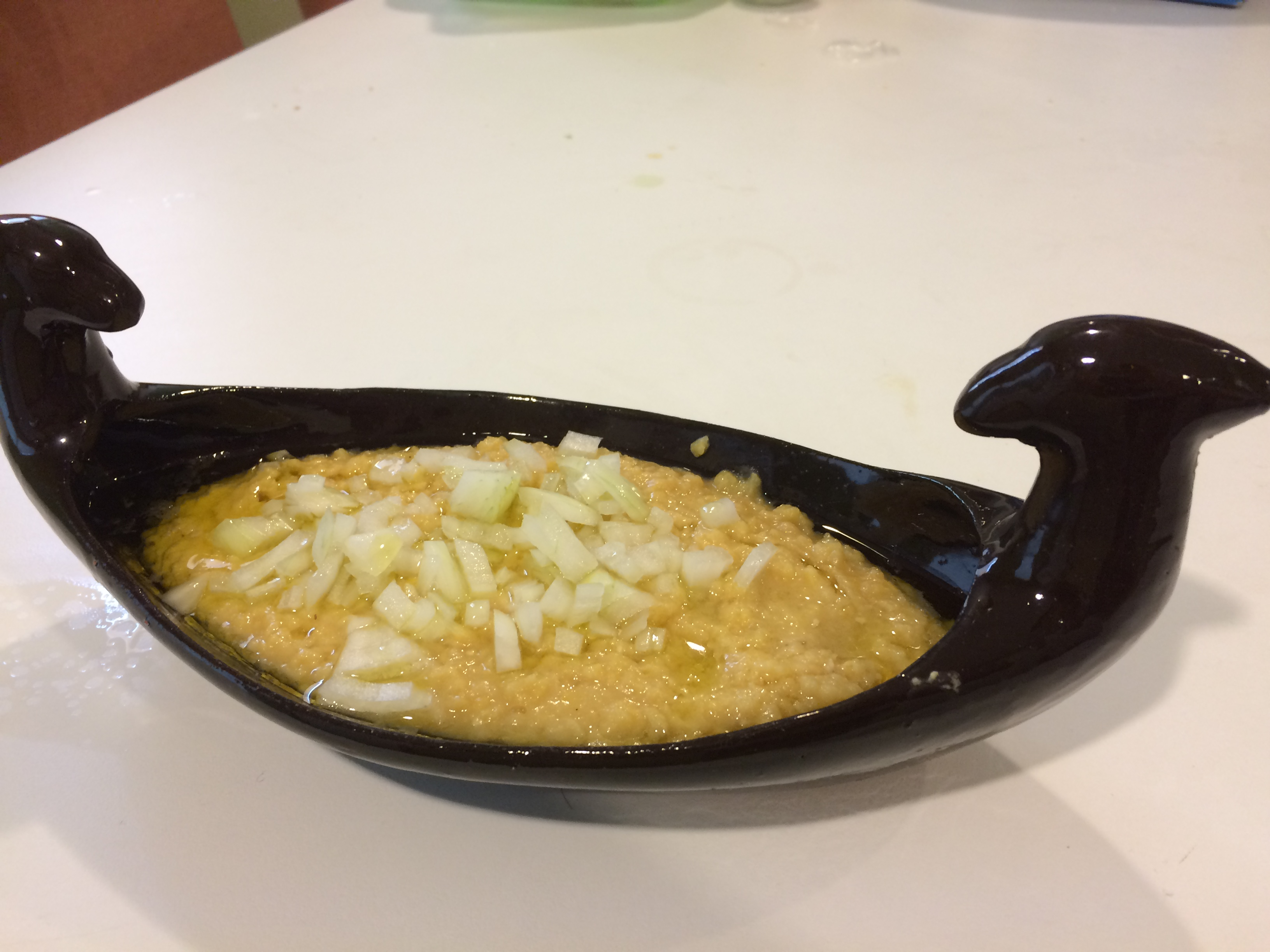
Greek fava

Fava (φάβα), in Greek cuisine, is a traditional dish made of split peas, typically yellow ones (and not, in spite of the name, of fava beans). They are cooked with chopped onion and mashed together with seasonings, garlic, lemon juice and oil into a thick, creamy paste. The dish can be eaten as such, warm or cold, but is also often used as a dip, much like hummus.

A special type of Greek fava, Fava Santorinis (φάβα Σαντορίνης), which has a protected designation of origin, uses the seeds of Spanish vetchling (Lathyrus clymenum), cultivated only on Santorini and neighbouring islands.

Fava originated in Byzantine cuisine; it was widely served in tavernes.

== See also ==
- Fava (Turkish dish)
