= Bulgur =

Cereal food made from groats of different wheat species

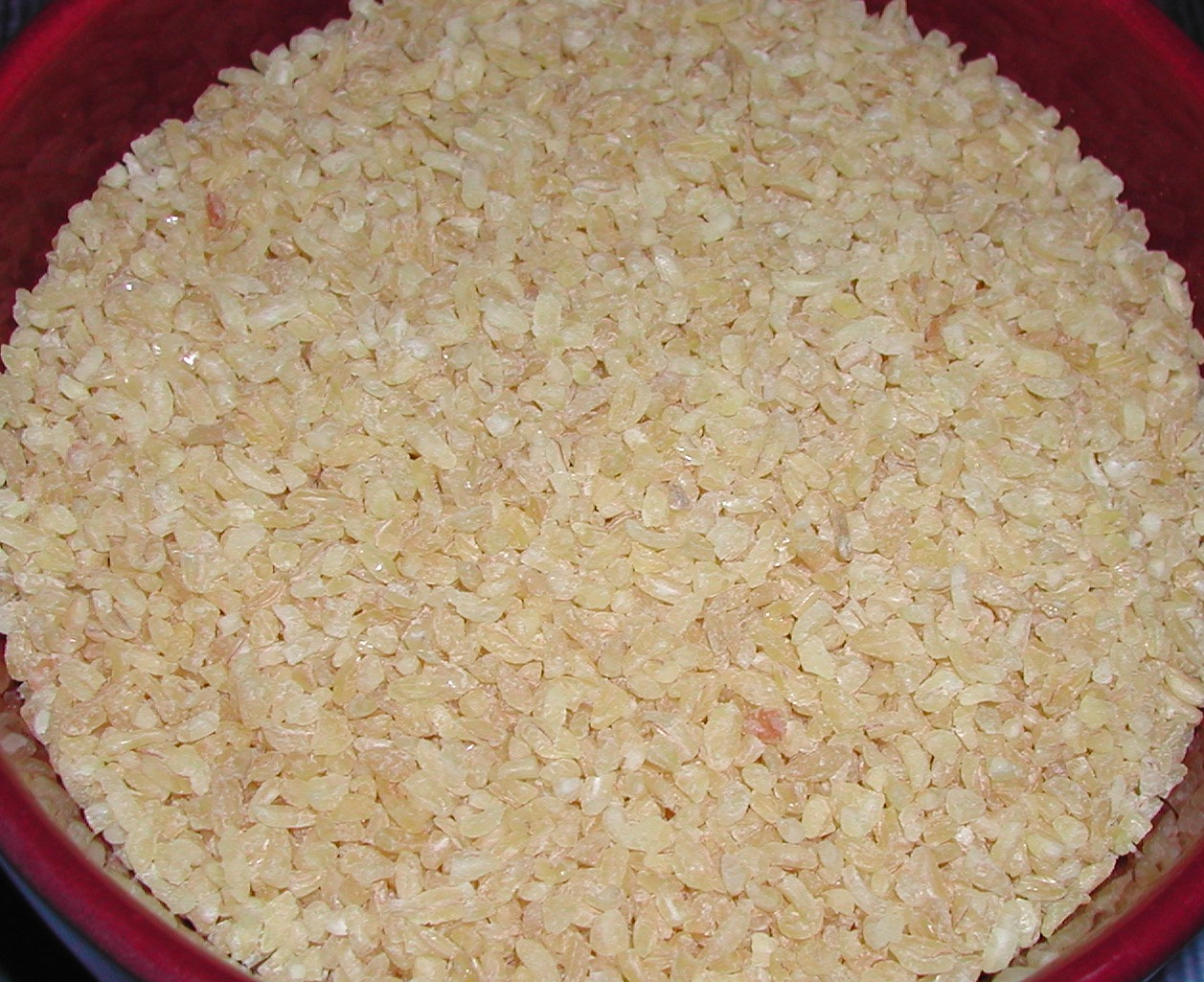
Coarse bulgur

Bulgur (Note: English: /ˈbʌlɡər, ˈbʊl-/ BUL-gər, BUUL-; Armenian: բլղուր, romanized: blghur, arabized: بلغور, pronounced [bəlˈʁuɾ]; Greek: πουργούρι / πλιγούρι, romanized: pourgoúri / pligoúri, cyrillized: пургури / плигури, arabized: بورغورى / بليغورى, pronounced [puɾˈɣuɾi / pliˈɣuɾi]; Turkish: bulgur, arabized: بلغور, hellenized: π̇ουγο̇ύρ, pronounced [buɫˈɡʊɾ]; Azerbaijani: булгур, romanized: bulqur, arabized: بلغور, pronounced [buɫˈɡuɾ]; Kurdish: بولخور / ساڤار, romanized: bulxur / savar, cyrillized: бӧлхӧр / савар, armenized: բւղխւր / սավար, pronounced [bʊlˈxʊɾ / saːˈvaːɾ]; Persian: بلغور, romanized: bolghur, cyrillized: булғур, hebraized: בלגור, pronounced [bʊlˈɢuːɾ]; Punjabi: ਬੁਲਗੁਰ, romanized: bulgur, arabized: بلغور, pronounced [bʊlgúːɾ]) or borghol (Note: Egyptian Arabic: برغل, romanized: borġol, cyrillized: боргьол, pronounced [boɾˈɣoɫ]) is a cracked wheat foodstuff found in Middle Eastern and South Asian cuisines, among others. It is a cereal food made from the groats of several different wheat species.

== Characteristics ==
Bulgur, cooked
Nutritional value per 100 g (3.5 oz)
- Energy: 350 kJ (84 kcal)
- Carbohydrates: 18.58 g
- Sugars: 0.10 g
- Dietary fiber: 4.5 g
- Fat: 0.24 g
- Protein: 3.08 g
Vitamins and minerals
Vitamins	Quantity %DV^{†}
Vitamin A equiv.	0% 0.0 μg
Vitamin A	1 IU
Thiamine (B1)	5% 0.057 mg
Riboflavin (B2)	2% 0.028 mg
Niacin (B3)	6% 1.000 mg
Vitamin B6	5% 0.083 mg
Folate (B9)	5% 18 μg
Vitamin C	0% 0.0 mg
Vitamin D	0% 0 μg
Vitamin E	0% 0.01 mg
Vitamin K	0% 0.5 μg
Minerals	Quantity %DV^{†}
Calcium	1% 10 mg
Iron	5% 0.96 mg
Magnesium	8% 32 mg
Phosphorus	3% 40 mg
Potassium	2% 68 mg
Sodium	0% 5 mg
Zinc	5% 0.57 mg
- Other constituents: Quantity
- Water: 78 g
- USDA Nutritional Database
- ^{†}Percentages estimated using US recommendations for adults, except for potassium, which is estimated based on expert recommendation from the National Academies.

Bulgur is produced by parboiling raw wheat, which is then de-hulled, dried, and cracked. Bulgur is a common ingredient in cuisines of many countries of the West Asian cuisine and Mediterranean Basin, such as Syria. It has a light, nutty flavor.

Bulgur is recognized as a whole grain by the United States Department of Agriculture.

=== Composition and nutrition ===
Cooked bulgur is 78% water, 19% carbohydrates, 3% protein, and contains negligible fat (table). A 100-gram (3 1/2-ounce) reference serving supplies 350 kilojoules (84 kilocalories) of food energy. A study of uncooked samples from different sources found, with some variation between samples, about 9% protein, 11% moisture, 1% ash, 70% starch of which 2–2.8% beneficial resistant starch, 7% fibre, mostly beneficial insoluble fibre.

== Etymology ==
The word bulgur is the Turkish pronunciation of the Arabic burghul (برغل), which is ultimately borrowed from the Persian barghul.

== History ==
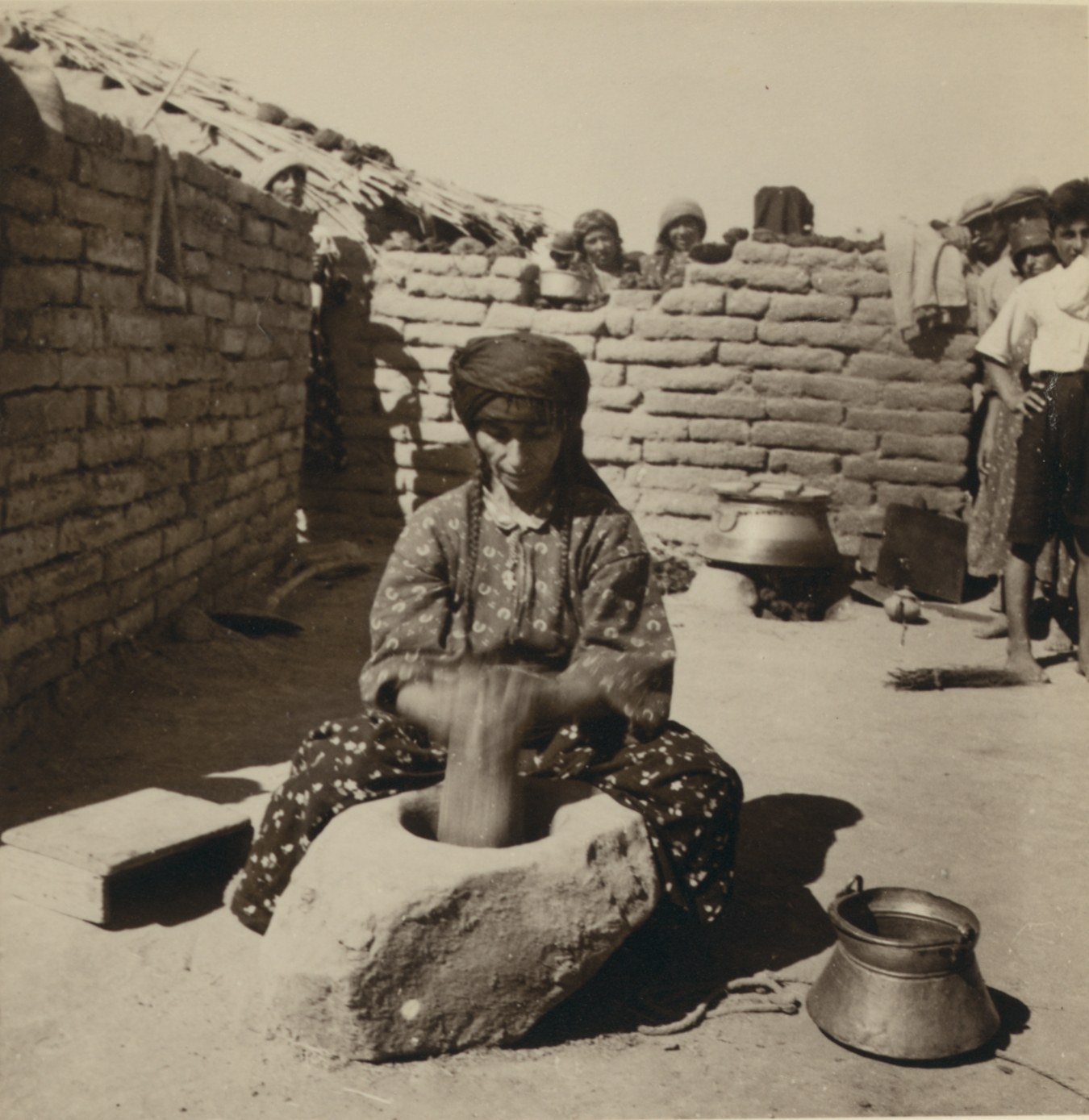
Assyrian woman pounding bulgur, Tell Tamer, 1939

Bulgur originated in the ancient Middle East; food historian Gil Marks dates it to circa 4000 BC. It is one of the first processed foods ever created. In medieval times, it was used to create kishk; a yogurt preserve made by drying a yoghurt and milk mixture, recipes for it can be found as early as the 10th century in the Arabic cookbook Kitāb al-Ṭabīkh by Ibn Sayyar al-Warraq. Bulgur was largely unknown in North America until the 20th century when it was brought in by Armenian, Syrian, and Jewish immigrants.

== Culinary uses ==
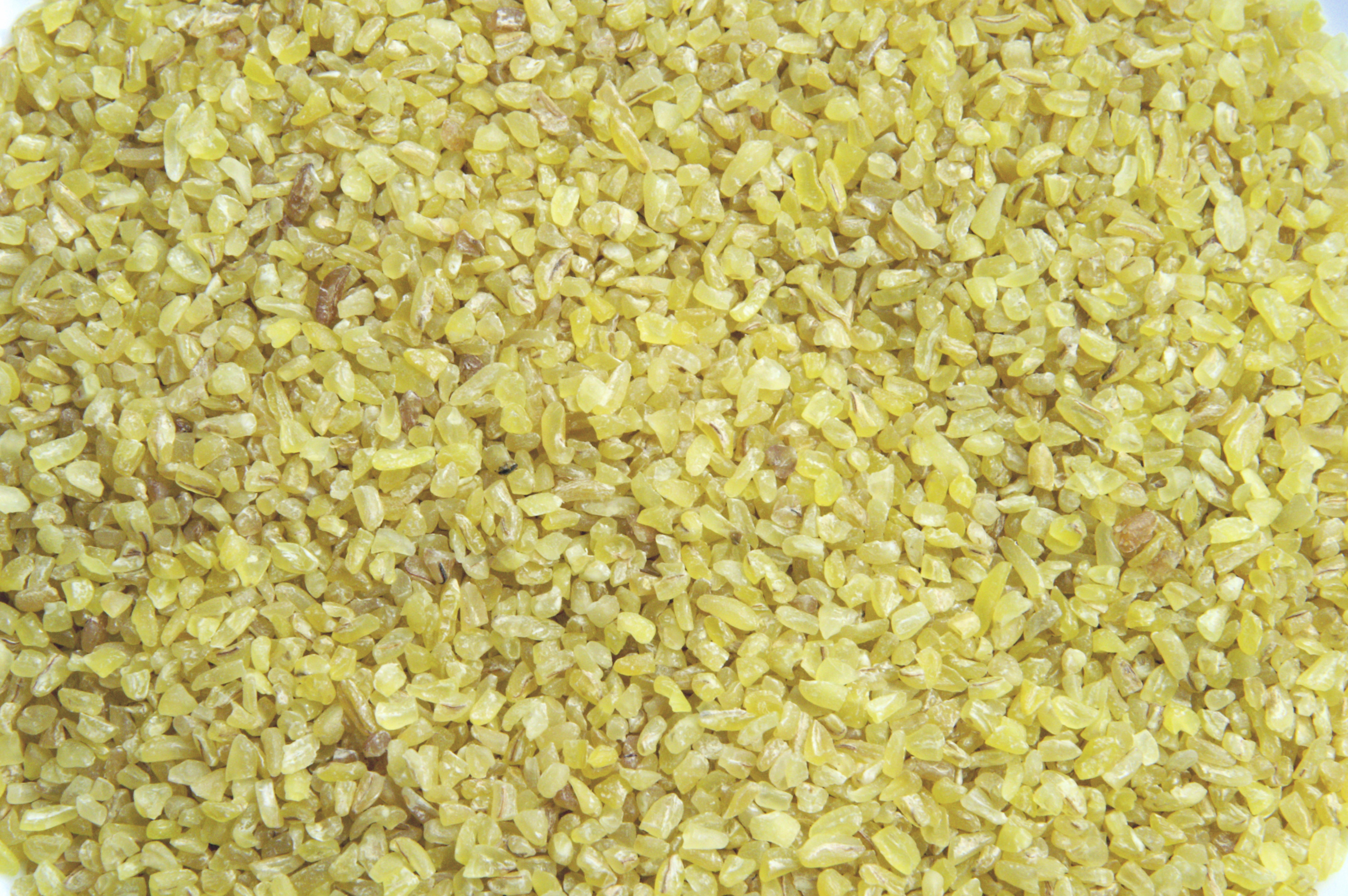
Coarse bulgur

Bulgur does not require cooking, although it can be included in cooked dishes; soaking in water is all that is needed.

Coarse bulgur is used to make pottages, while the medium and fine grains are used as breakfast cereals, and in pilavs, breads, salads such as kısır, and dessert puddings such as kheer. Bulgur porridge is similar to frumenty, a cracked wheat porridge that was a staple of medieval cuisine.

In breads, it adds a whole-grain component. It is a main ingredient in kibbeh and in tabbouleh salad. It is often used where rice or couscous could be used. It can be used to accompany other dishes in the same way as pasta or rice.

Armenians prepare bulgur as a pilaf in chicken stock, with or without sautéed noodles, or cooked with tomatoes, onions, herbs and red pepper. Finely ground bulgur is used for making eetch, a salad similar to tabbouleh.

In Greece, it is known as πλιγούρι (pligouri) and in Cyprus as πουρκούρι (pourkouri), where it is used to make κούπες (koupes, known as içli köfte in Turkish), a variety of kibbeh. It is deep-fried, with a crust made of fine bulgur, flour, oil, salt and egg, filled with ground meat (beef, pork, or both), onions, parsley and spices.

The Saudi Arabian version of bulgur, especially common in Nejd and Al-Hasa, is known as jarish (Arabic: جَريش).

== Production and consumption ==
A 2007 study published in the Journal of Food Engineering found that the consumption of bulgur in south-eastern Turkey was 2 and 2.5 times that of pasta and rice, respectively, with the average person consuming 25 kilograms of bulgur annually, and in the Levant, Arabia, Iran, and Iraq, it reached 30-35 kilograms annually.

== See also ==
- Einkorn wheat
- Freekeh
- Laapsi
- Semolina
- Wheat berry
