= Eetch =

Armenian side dish

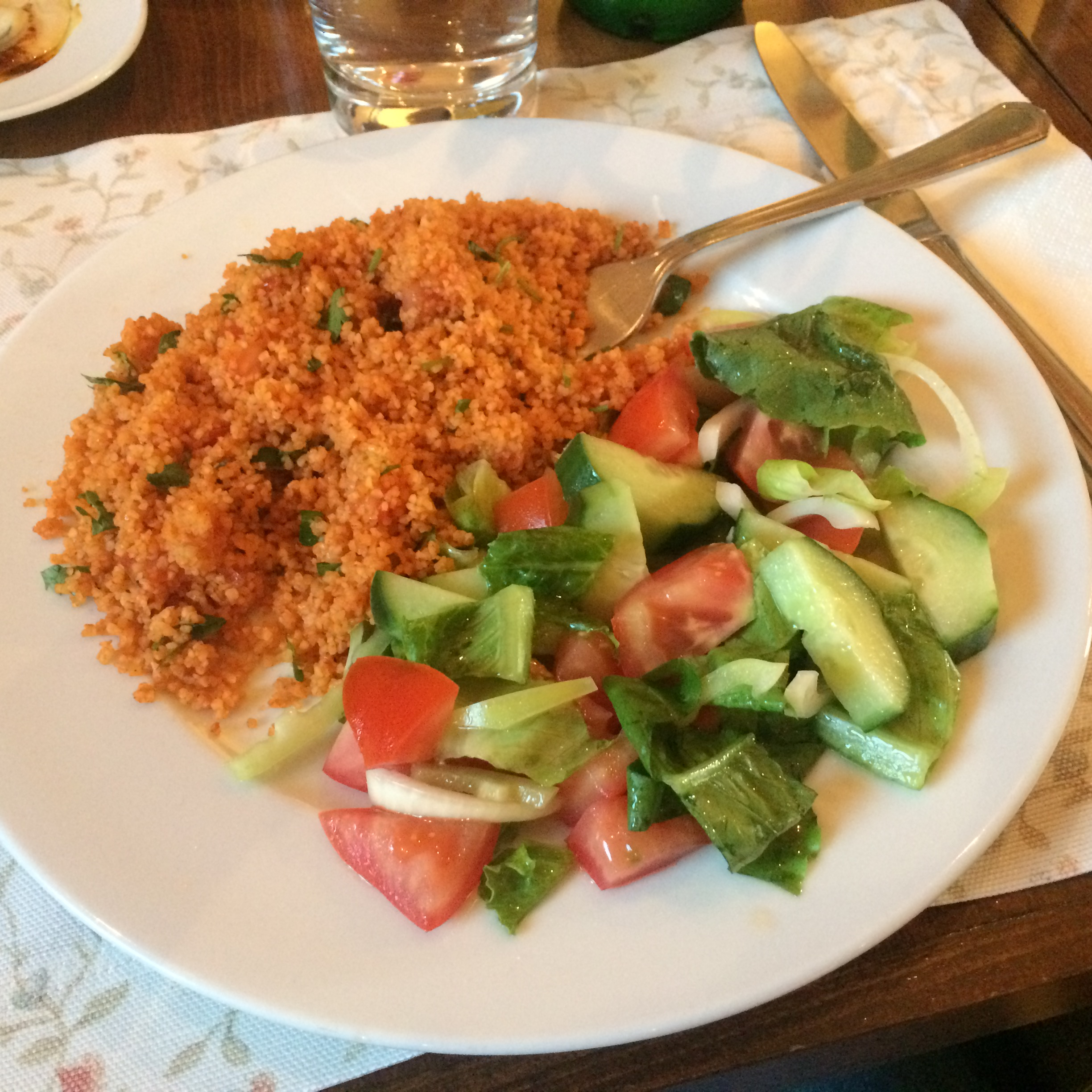
- Armenian eetch served as a side dish at a restaurant in Yerevan
- Type: Salad
- Place of origin: Armenia
- Associated cuisine: Armenian cuisine
- Main ingredients: Bulgur
- Similar dishes: Tabbouleh

Eetch (Armenian: Էտչ) otherwise known as eech, itch, metch or one of several other variations is a traditional Armenian side dish, salad or spread, similar to tabbouleh. Eetch can be eaten either at room temperature or warm.

Its typical red colour is derived from crushed or pureed tomatoes. Common additional ingredients include onion, parsley, olive oil, lemon, paprika, and bell peppers.

Eetch is colloquially known as mock kheyma due to its characteristics as a vegetarian form of kheyma.

== See also ==
- Kısır

== Bibliography ==
- The Cuisine of Armenia. Sonia Uvezian, (2001) ISBN 0-9709716-7-2
- The Armenian Cookbook ISBN 0-689-10387-5
- Cuisine of Armenia; Sonia Uvezian ISBN 0-7818-0417-5
- Complete Armenia Cookbook; Vezjian; ISBN 0-915033-00-3
