= Ambalaseri =

- village
- Location in Tamil Nadu, India Ambalaseri (India)
- Coordinates: 8°31′25″N 77°54′10″E
- Country: India
- State: Tamil Nadu

Languages
  - Official: Tamil
- Time zone: UTC+5:30 (IST)

Ambalaseri is a village in Thoothukudi District in the southern region of Tamil Nadu, India. The village has a population of roughly 1500 people.

== Economy ==
Rice, dal, peanuts and bananas are the main agricultural products.
