= Ezogelin soup =

Turkish soup

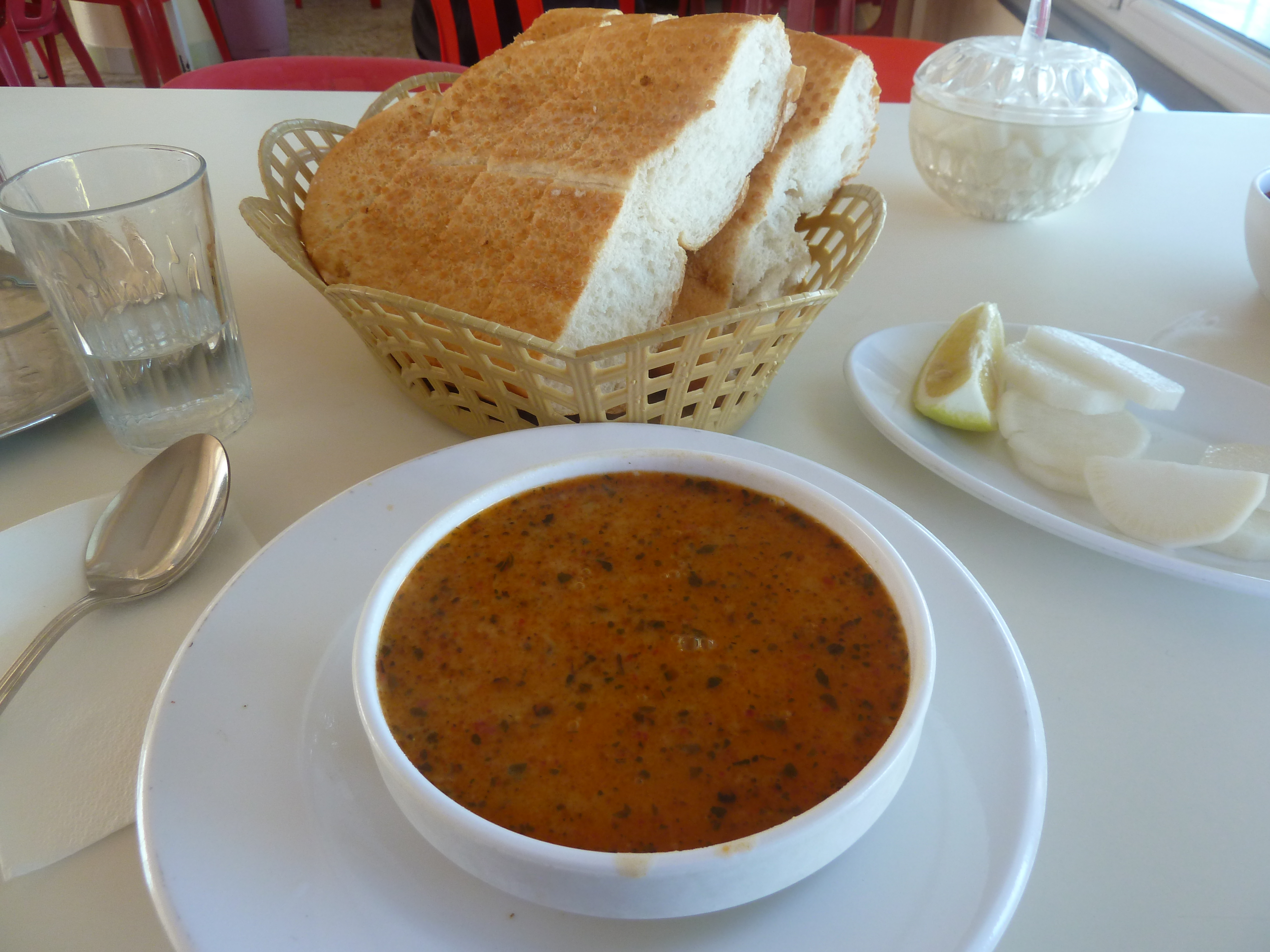
- Ezogelin soup and bread
- Type: Soup
- Place of origin: Turkey
- Main ingredients: Bulgur, red lentils, rice, olive oil, butter, onions, garlic, tomatoes, tomato paste, paprika, hot peppers

Ezogelin soup or Ezo gelin soup (Turkish: Ezogelin çorbası, "the soup of Ezo the bride") is a common soup in Turkish cuisine. The main ingredients are bulgur and red lentils. The origin of the soup is attributed to Ezo the bride from Gaziantep.

Common ingredients include red lentils, rice, bulgur, olive oil, onion, garlic, tomato, tomato paste, paprika, Aleppo pepper, dried mint, black pepper, and salt; it is usually served with lemon wedges.

== See also ==
- Lentil soup
- Dal
- List of soups
