= Lentil soup =

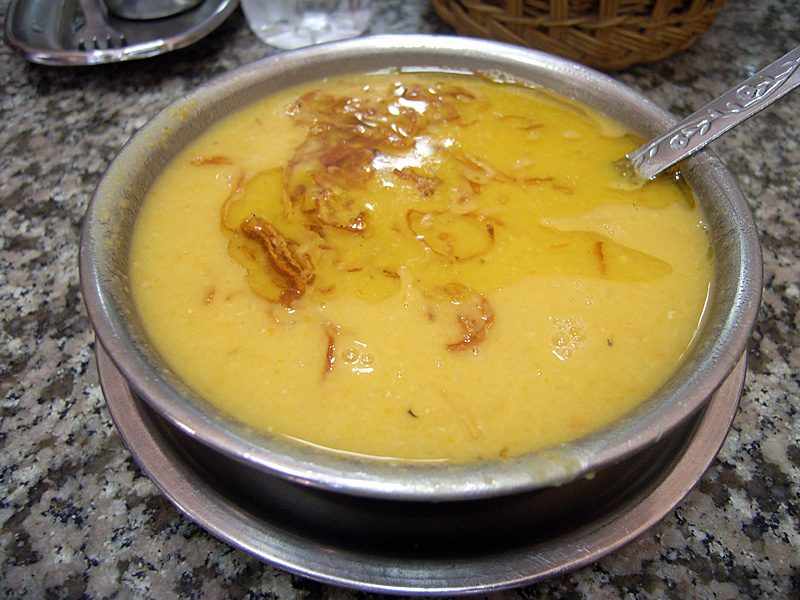
- Egyptian lentil soup
- Alternative names: shurbat al-adas, mercimek, tlokheh, shorbay neesik, Linsensuppe
- Type: Soup
- Course: Starter
- Main ingredients: Lentils (green, brown, red, yellow or black)

Lentil soup is a soup with lentils as its main ingredient; brown, red, yellow, green or black lentils, with or without the husk, may be used. Dehulled yellow and red lentils disintegrate during cooking, making a thick soup. Lentil soup is a staple food throughout Europe, Latin America and the Middle East.

== History and literature ==
Lentils were unearthed in the Paleolithic and Mesolithic layers of Franchthi Cave in Greece (13,000 to 9,500 years ago), in the end-Mesolithic at Mureybet and Tell Abu Hureyra in Syria, and at sites dating to 8000 BC in the area of Jericho. Aristophanes (5th – 4th centuries BC) called it the "sweetest of delicacies". Remains of lentils were found in royal tombs in the Theban Necropolis in Egypt, dating to 2400 BC. The Roman cookbook Apicius, compiled in the 1st century AD, includes a recipe for lentil soup with chestnuts.

Lentil soup is mentioned in the Bible: in Genesis 25:30-34, Esau is prepared to give up his birthright for a pot of fragrant red lentil soup being cooked by his brother, Jacob. This narrative indicates that lentil soup was eaten in ancient Israel. In Jewish tradition, lentil soup has been served at times of mourning; the roundness of the lentil represents a complete cycle of life.

== Varieties ==
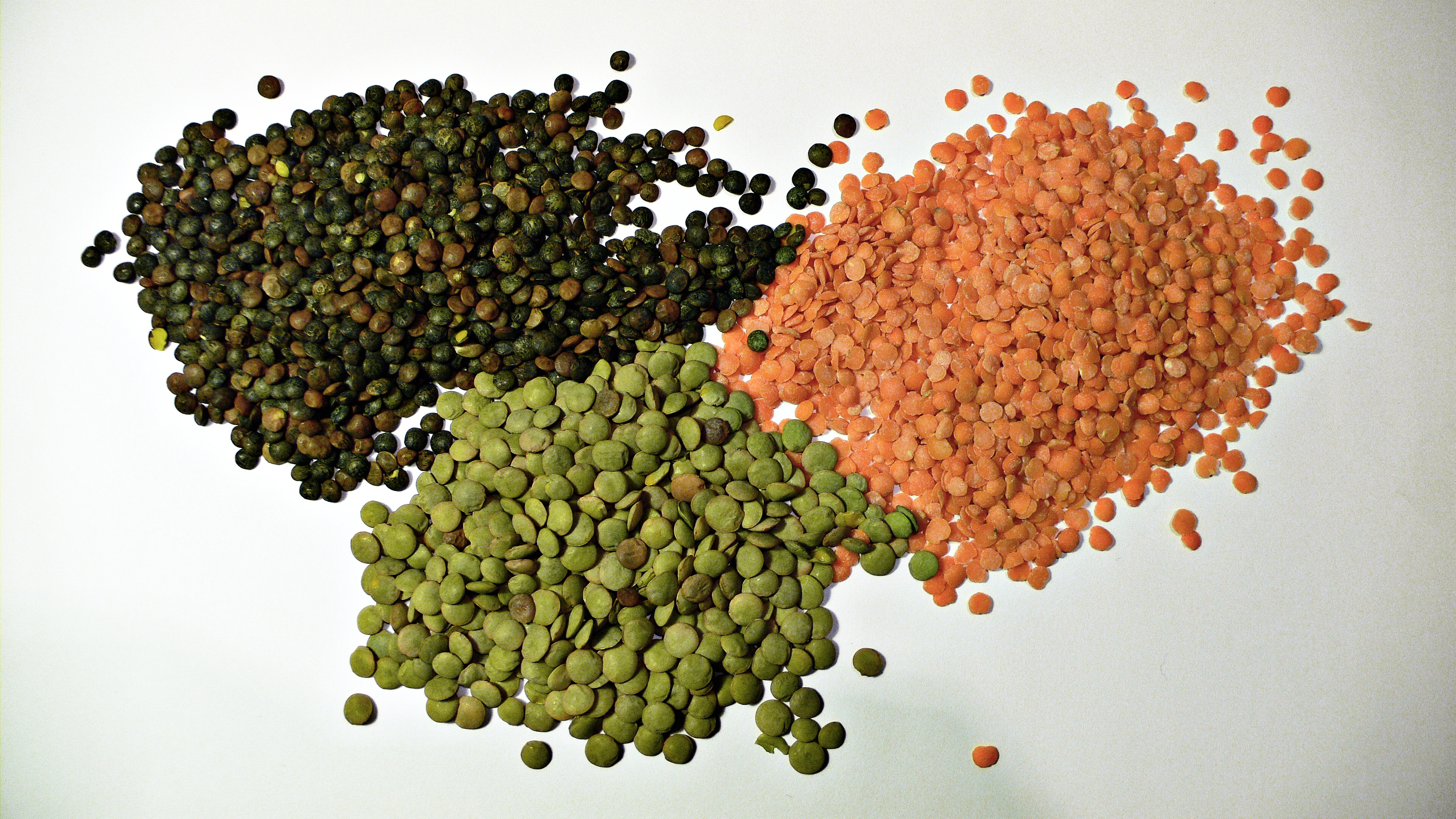
Several types of lentils used in lentil soup

Lentil soup may include vegetables such as carrots, potatoes, celery, parsley, tomato, pumpkin, ripe plantain and onion. Common flavorings are garlic, bay leaf, cumin, olive oil, cardamom and vinegar. It is sometimes garnished with croutons or chopped herbs or butter, olive oil, cream or yogurt. Indian lentil soup contains a variety of aromatic spices.

In Iraqi and Levantine cuisine the soup is seasoned with turmeric and cumin and topped with toasted, thin vermicelli noodles called sha'iriyya (شعيرية), and served with a lemon for squeezing. In the Middle East, the addition of lemon juice gives a pungent tang and cuts the heaviness of the dish. Rishta is a lentil and pasta soup traditionally made in Lebanon. In Egypt and throughout the Middle East, the soup is commonly puréed before serving, and is traditionally consumed in the winter.

Lentil soups
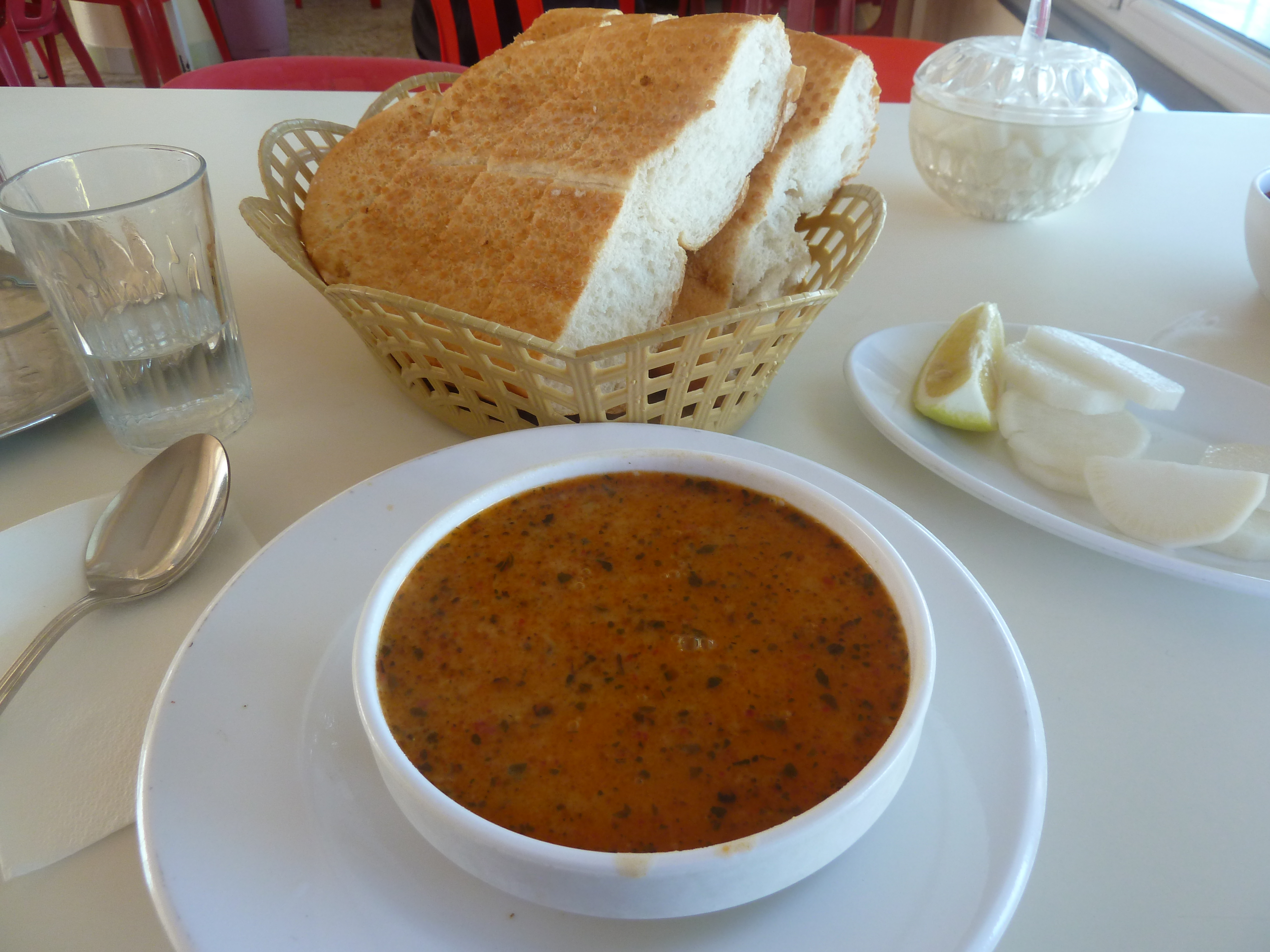
Turkish ezogelin soup is made with bulgur and red lentils.

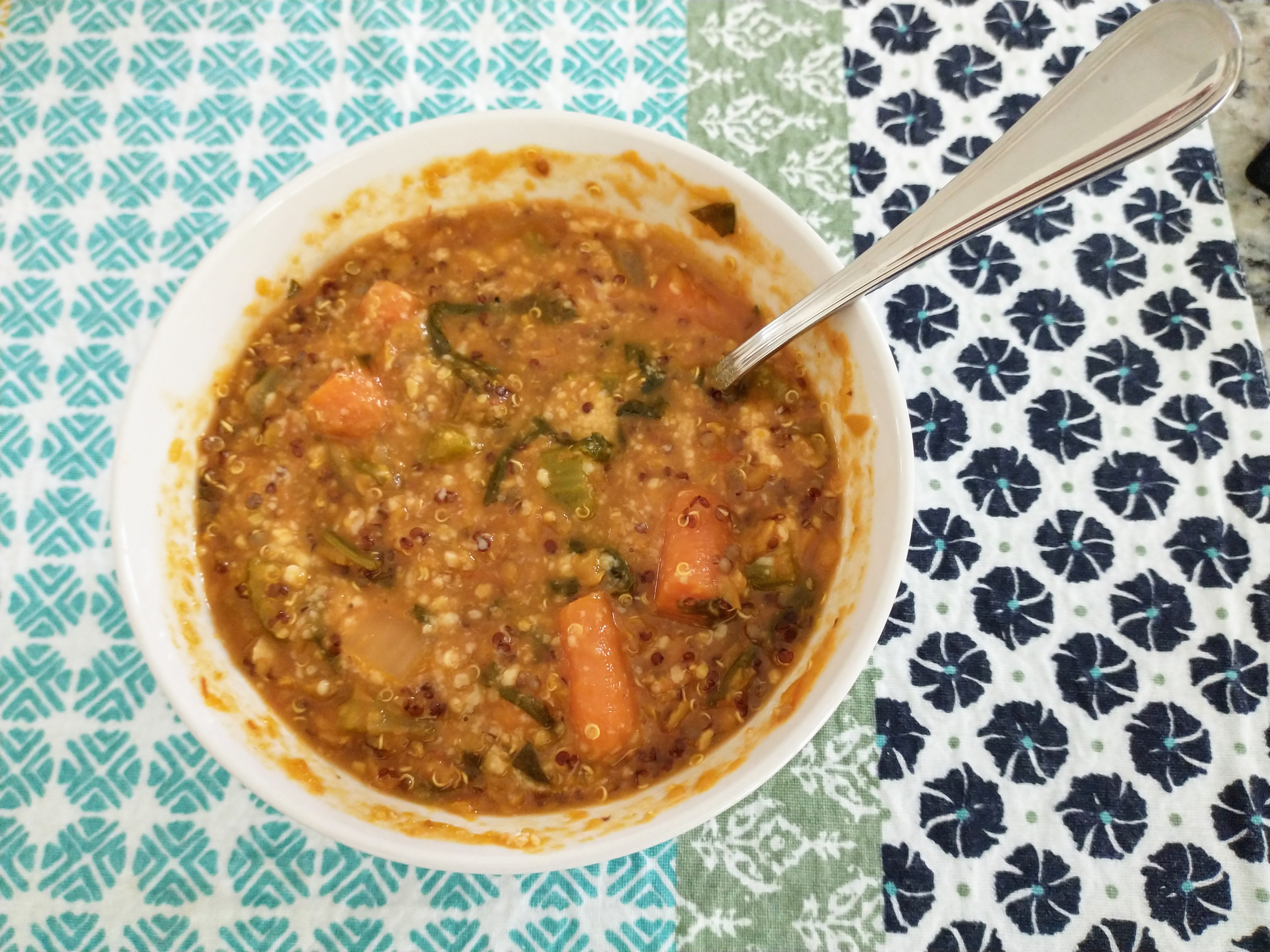
Bowl of lentil soup with green and red lentils

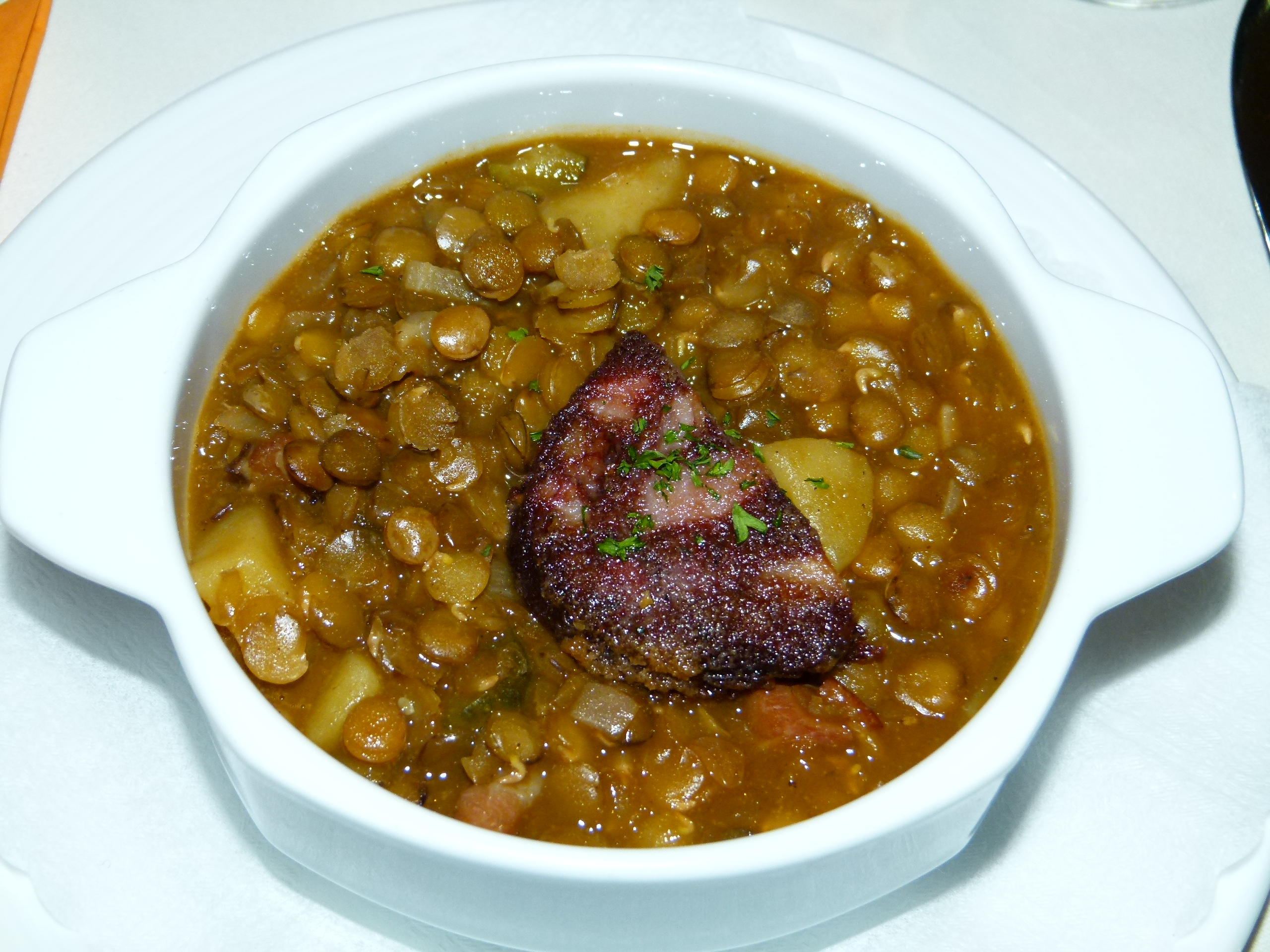
A German lentil soup with blood sausage

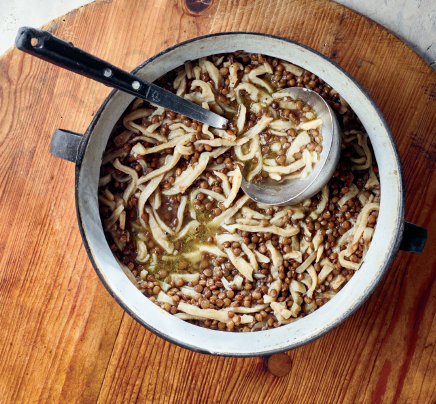
Rishta; middle-eastern lentil and noodle soup

== Nutrition ==
Lentil soup is recognized as highly nutritious, a good source of protein, dietary fiber, iron and potassium.

== See also ==
- List of soups
- Dal, Indian lentil preparations
- Ezogelin soup, a Turkish lentil and wheat soup
- Gheymeh, an Iranian lentil stew with red meat served over rice
- Haleem, a soup with wheat, barley, lentils, and meat
- Pea soup
