= Dal =

Dried, split pulses used for cooking

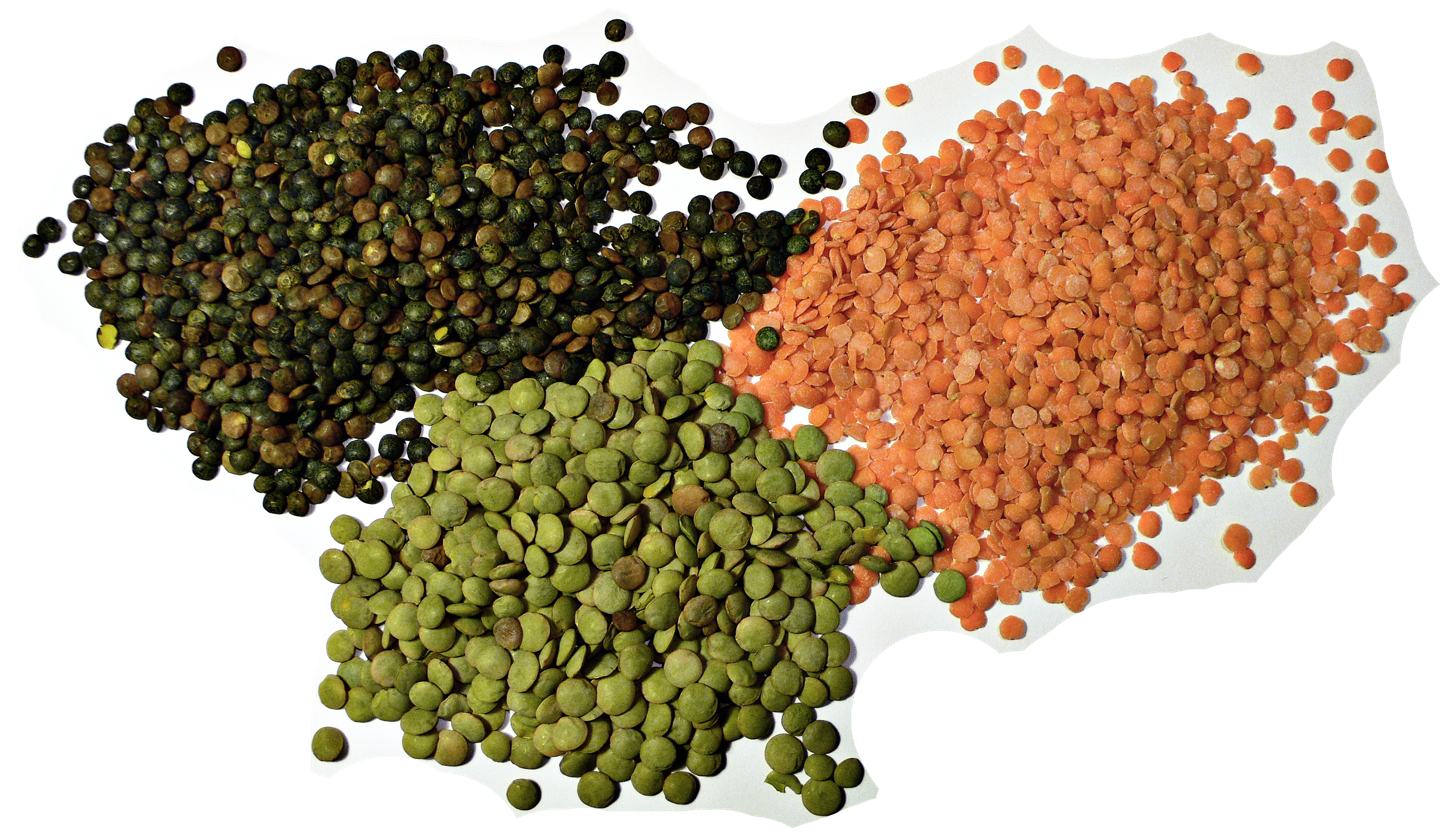
- Lentils are a staple ingredient in cuisines from South Asia. Clockwise from upper right: split red lentils, common green whole lentils, and Le Puy lentils. Whole lentils have their outer coats visible.
- Alternative names: Daal, dail, dahl, parripu, pappu, ooti, daje
- Region or state: South Asia, Caribbean, Africa
- Main ingredients: Lentils, peas or beans

Dal (also spelled daal, dahl or dhal; pronunciation: [d̪aːl]) are dried, split pulses (e.g., lentils, peas, and beans) that can require soaking before cooking. India is the largest producer of pulses in the world. These pulses are among the leading staple foods in South Asian countries, and form an important part of the cuisines of the Indian subcontinent.

== Etymology ==
The dāl (dal) derives from the Sanskrit verbal root dal- "to split", which is inherited from Proto-Indo-European *delh₁- "to split, divide".

== History ==
Lentils are among the most ancient cultivated foods; they have been found in human settlements dating back to the Bronze Age. Researchers have dated the preparation and cooking of split dal as far back as 800–300 BC.

Dal as a staple food has been mentioned in many ancient religious texts, including the Yajurveda and the Mahayana Buddhist Laṅkāvatāra Sūtra.

May for me strength, righteousness, milk, sap, ghee, honey, eating and drinking in company, ploughing, rain, conquest, victory, wealth, riches, prosperity, prospering, plenteousness, lordship, much, more, fun, fuller, imperishableness, bad crops, food, freedom from hunger, rice, barley, beans, sesame, kidney beans, vetches, wheat, lentils, millet, Panicum miliaceum, Panicum frumentaceum, and wild rice (prosper through the sacrifice).

— Yajurveda, Kanda IV, Prapathaka VII, trans. Arthur Berriedale Keith

Now, Mahāmati, the food I have permitted [my disciples to take] is gratifying to all wise people but is avoided by the unwise; it is productive of many merits, it keeps away many evils; and it has been prescribed by the ancient Rishis. It comprises rice, barley, wheat, kidney beans, beans, lentils, etc., [...] food prepared with these is proper food.

— Laṅkāvatāra Sūtra 249–250, trans. D. T. Suzuki

== Use ==
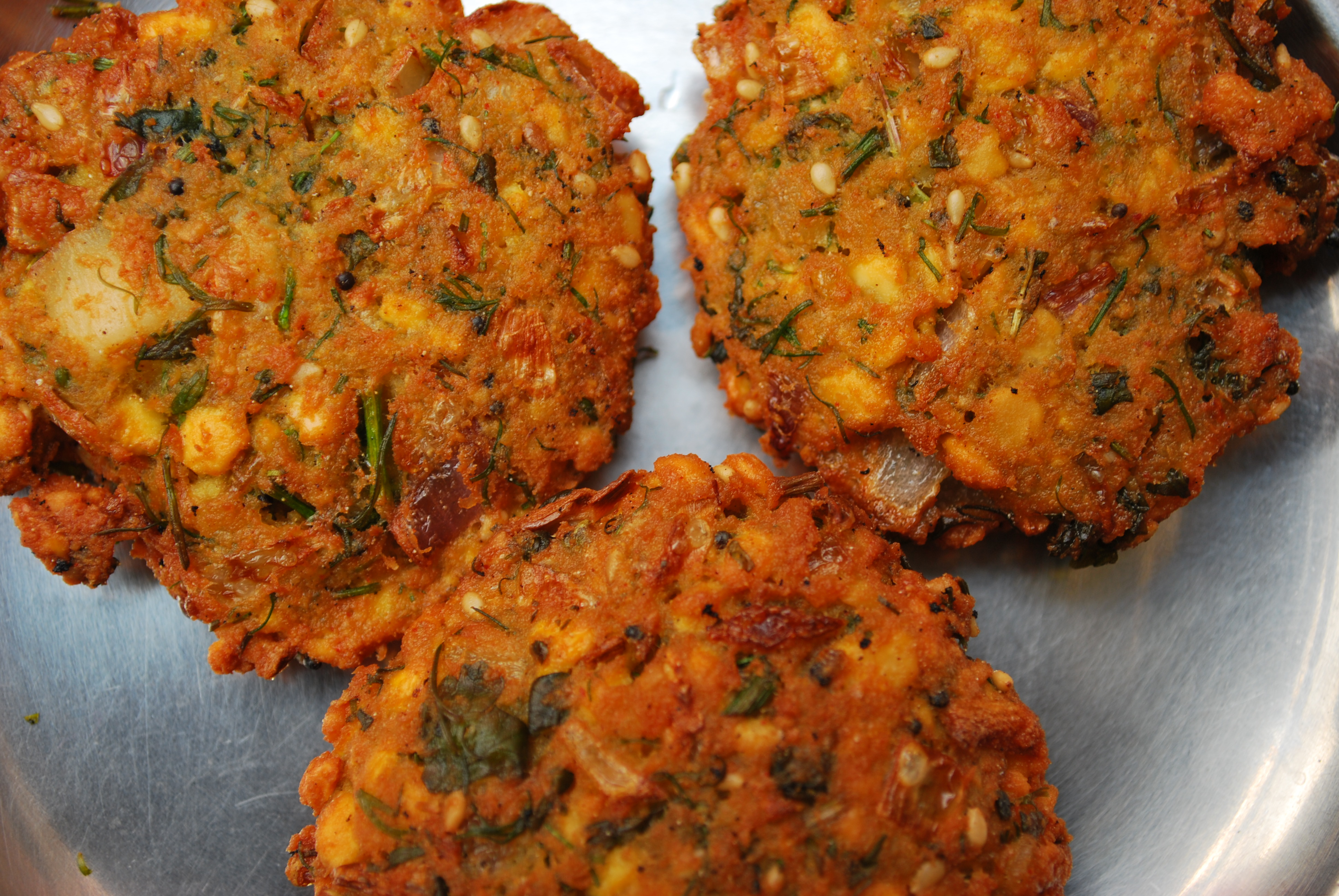
Dal or paruppu is the main ingredient of the Indian snack vada.

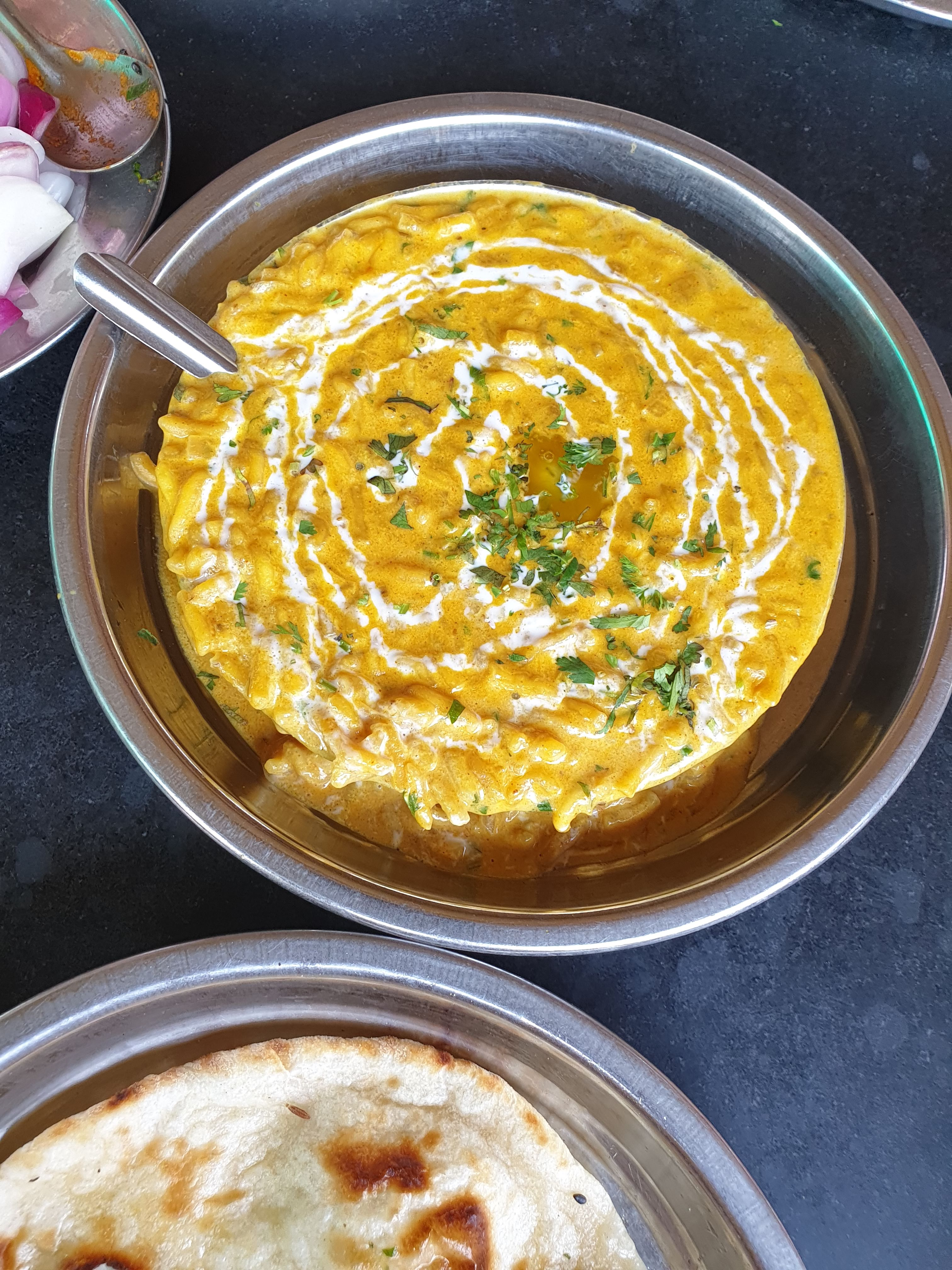
Dal tadka and naan

Dal are often prepared in three different forms:

- Unhulled and whole, known as sabut ('whole' in Hindi), such as sabut urad dal or mung sabut;
- Unhulled and split, known as chilka ('shell' in Hindi), such as chilka urad dal or mung dal chilka;
- Hulled and split, known as dhuli ('washed' in Hindi), e.g. urad dhuli, or mung dhuli.

The hulling of a pulse is intended to improve digestibility and palatability. It also affects the nutrition provided by the dish, significantly increasing protein and reducing dietary fibre content. Pulses with their outer hulls intact are also quite popular in the Indian subcontinent as the main cuisine. Over 50 different varieties of pulses are known in the Indian subcontinent.

Dal is frequently eaten with flatbreads, such as rotis or chapatis, or with rice. The latter combination is called dal bhat in Nepali, Gujarati, and various other Indian languages. In addition, certain types of dal are fried, salted, and eaten as a dry snack, and a variety of savory snacks are made by frying a paste made from soaked and ground dals in different combinations, to which other ingredients, such as spices and nuts (commonly cashews) may be added.

Dal preparations are eaten with rice, chapati, and naan on the Indian subcontinent. The manner in which it is cooked and presented varies by region. In South India, dal is often called "paruppu". It is primarily used to make a dish called sambar. It is also used to make parippu that is mixed with charu and rice. Ground chana dal is used to make a paste called besan, which is used in the preparation of many dishes including bhaji and Mediterranean dishes like farinata. Afghan dal is usually thicker and less soupy than Indian dal.

== Preparation ==
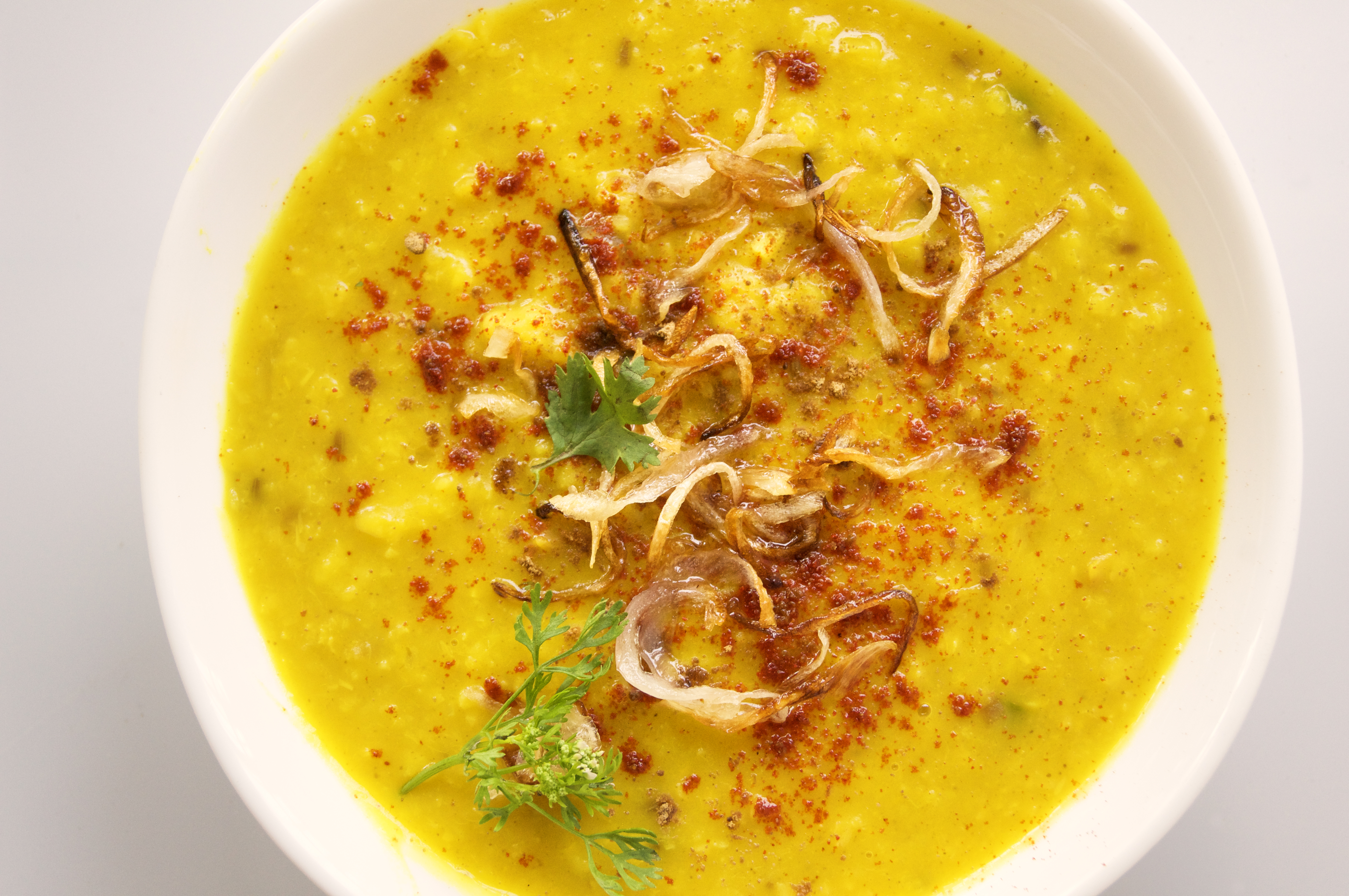
Dal tadka garnished with fried onion

Most dal recipes are quite simple to prepare. The standard preparation begins with boiling a variety of dal (or a mix) in water with some turmeric, salt to taste, and then adding a fried garnish at the end of the cooking process. In some recipes, tomatoes, kokum, unripe mango, jaggery, or other ingredients are added while cooking the dal, often to impart a sweet-sour flavour.

The fried garnish for dal goes by many names, including chaunk, tadka/tarka, bagar, fodni, and phoran. The ingredients in the chaunk for each variety of dal vary by region and individual tastes. The raw spices (more commonly cumin seeds, mustard seeds, asafoetida, and sometimes fenugreek seeds and dried red chili pepper) are first fried for a few seconds in the hot oil on medium/low heat. This is generally followed by ginger, garlic, and onion, which are generally fried for 10 minutes. After the onion turns golden brown, ground spices (turmeric, coriander, red chili powder, garam masala, etc.) are added. The chaunk is then poured over the cooked dal.

== Common ingredients ==
- Pigeon pea, i.e., yellow pigeon pea, is available either plain or oily. It is called toor dal in Hindi. It is called thuvaram paruppu in Tamil Nadu, thuvara parippu in Kerala and is the main ingredient for the dish sambar. In Karnataka, it is called togari bele and is an important ingredient in bisi bele bath. It is called kandi pappu in Telugu and is used in the preparation of a staple dish pappu charu. It is also known as arhar dal in northern India.
- Chana dal is produced by removing the outer layer of black chickpeas and then splitting the kernel. Although machines can do this, it can be done at home by soaking the whole chickpeas and removing the loose skins by rubbing. In Karnataka it is called kadle bele. Other varieties of chickpea may be used, e.g., kabuli dal.
- Yellow split peas are very prevalent in the Indian communities of Guyana, Fiji, Suriname, Jamaica, South Africa, Mauritius, Trinidad and Tobago, and are popular amongst Indians in the United States as well as India. There, it is referred to generically as dal and is the most popular dal. It is prepared similarly to dals found in India, but may be used in recipes. The whole dried pea is called matar or matar dal in India. The whole dried yellow pea is the main ingredient in the common Bengali street food ghugni.
- Split mung beans (mung dal) is by far the most popular in Bangladesh and West Bengal (moog dal, (মুগ ডাল)). It is used in parts of South India, such as in the Tamil dish ven pongal. Roasted and lightly salted or spiced mung bean is a popular snack in most parts of India.
- Urad dal, sometimes referred to as "black gram", is a primary ingredient of the south Indian dishes idli and dosa. It is one of the main ingredients of East Indian (Odia and Bengali or Assamese) bori, sun-dried dumplings. The Punjabi version is dal makhani. It is called uddina bele in Karnataka, biulir dal in Bengali. It is rich in protein.
- Masoor dal: split red lentils. In Karnataka, it is called kempu (red) togari bele.
- Rajma dal: split kidney beans.
- Mussyang is made from dals of various colours found in various hilly regions of Nepal.
- Panchratna dal (Hindi) ("five jewels") is a mixture of five varieties of dal, which produces a dish with a unique flavour.
- Navrangi dal is a lesser known Dal variety from Himachal Pradesh. It is mostly cultivated in Himachal and is multicoloured.
- Moth bean: is an Indian dal main ingredient for popular Indian snack bikaneri bhujia and Maharashtrian snacks misal and usal.
- Pulses may be split but not hulled; they are distinguished from hulled dals by adding the word chilka (skin).

== Gallery ==
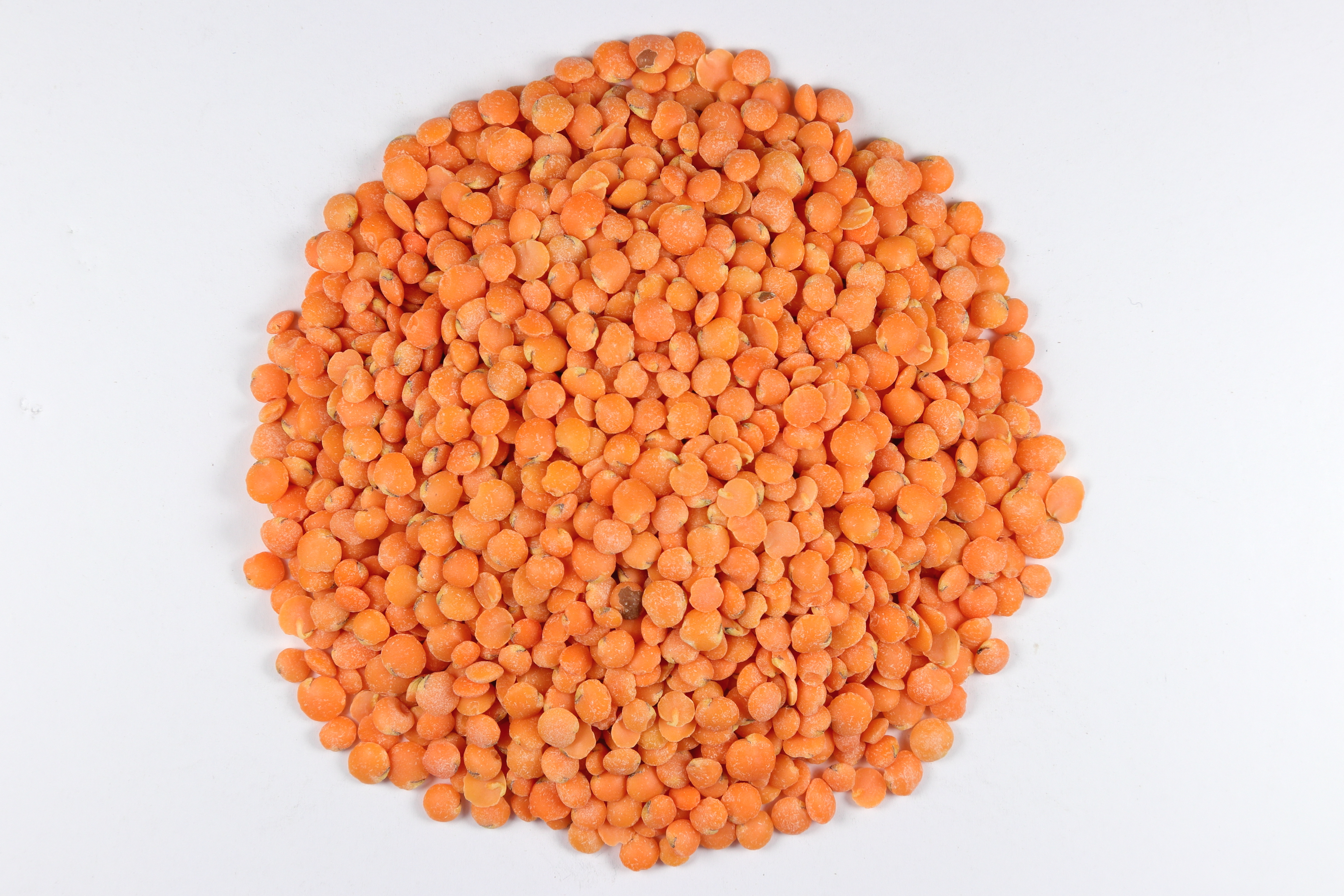
Split red lentil seeds

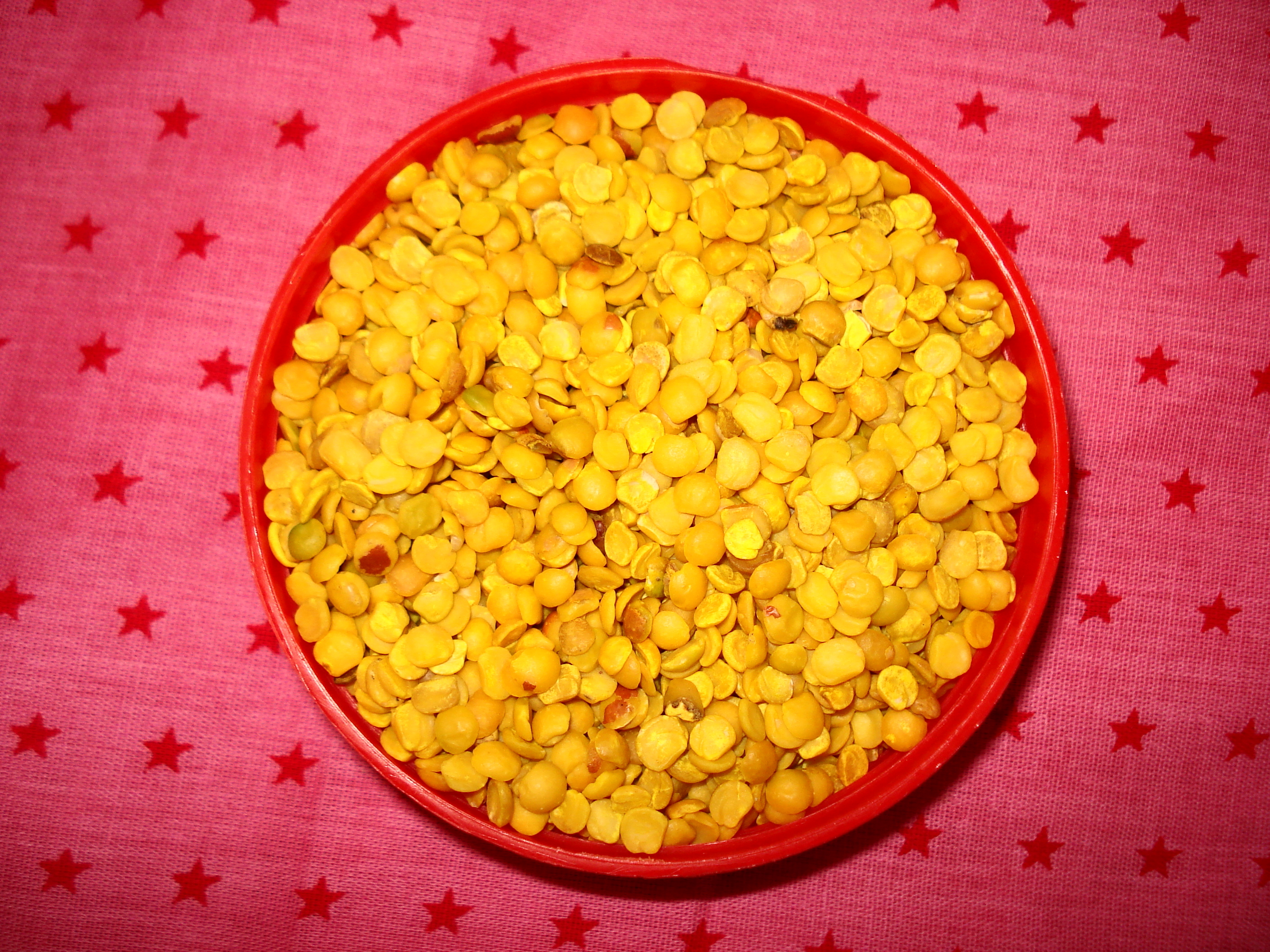
Split pigeon pea, commonly used in dal

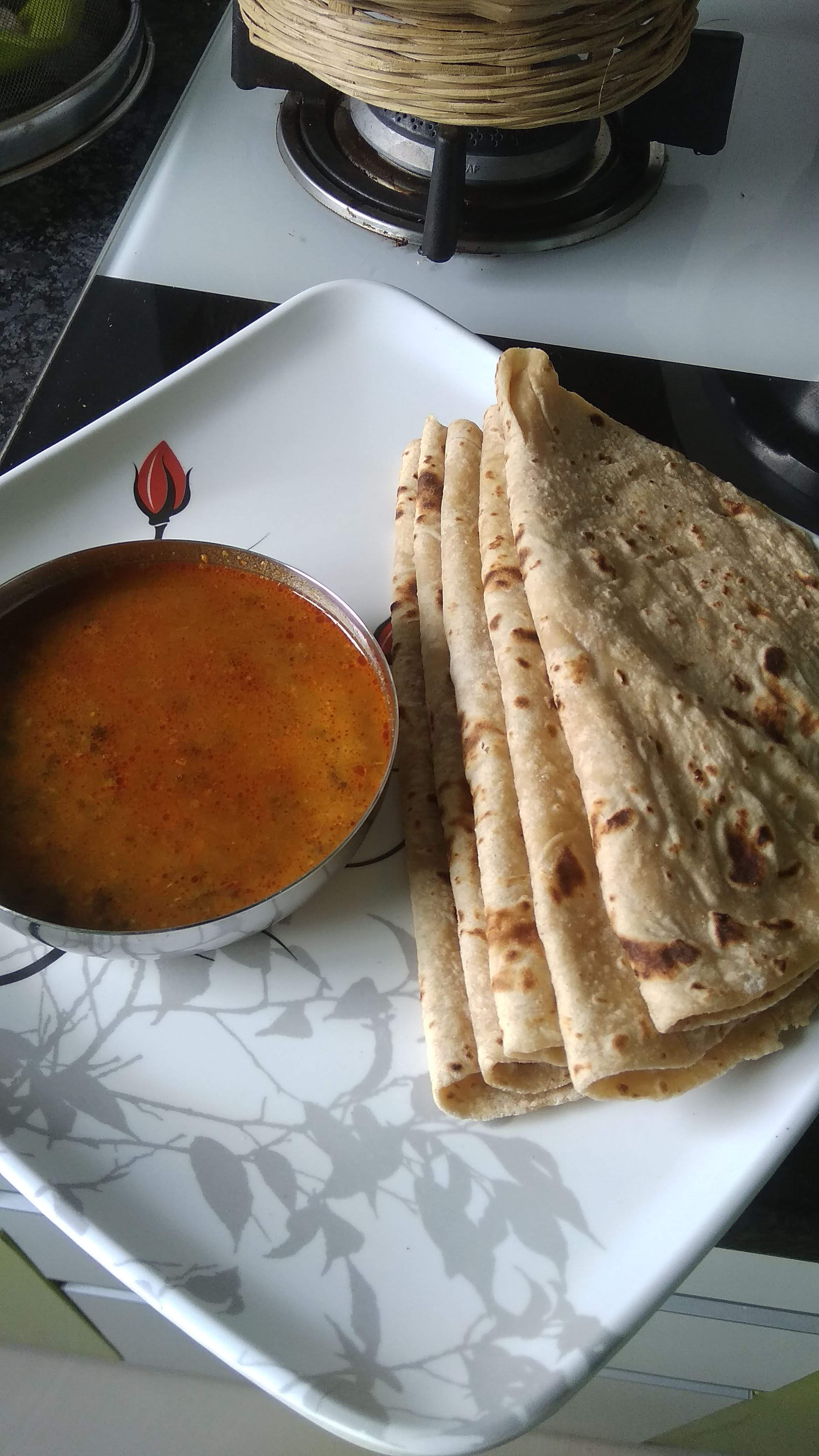
Dal tadka and chapati

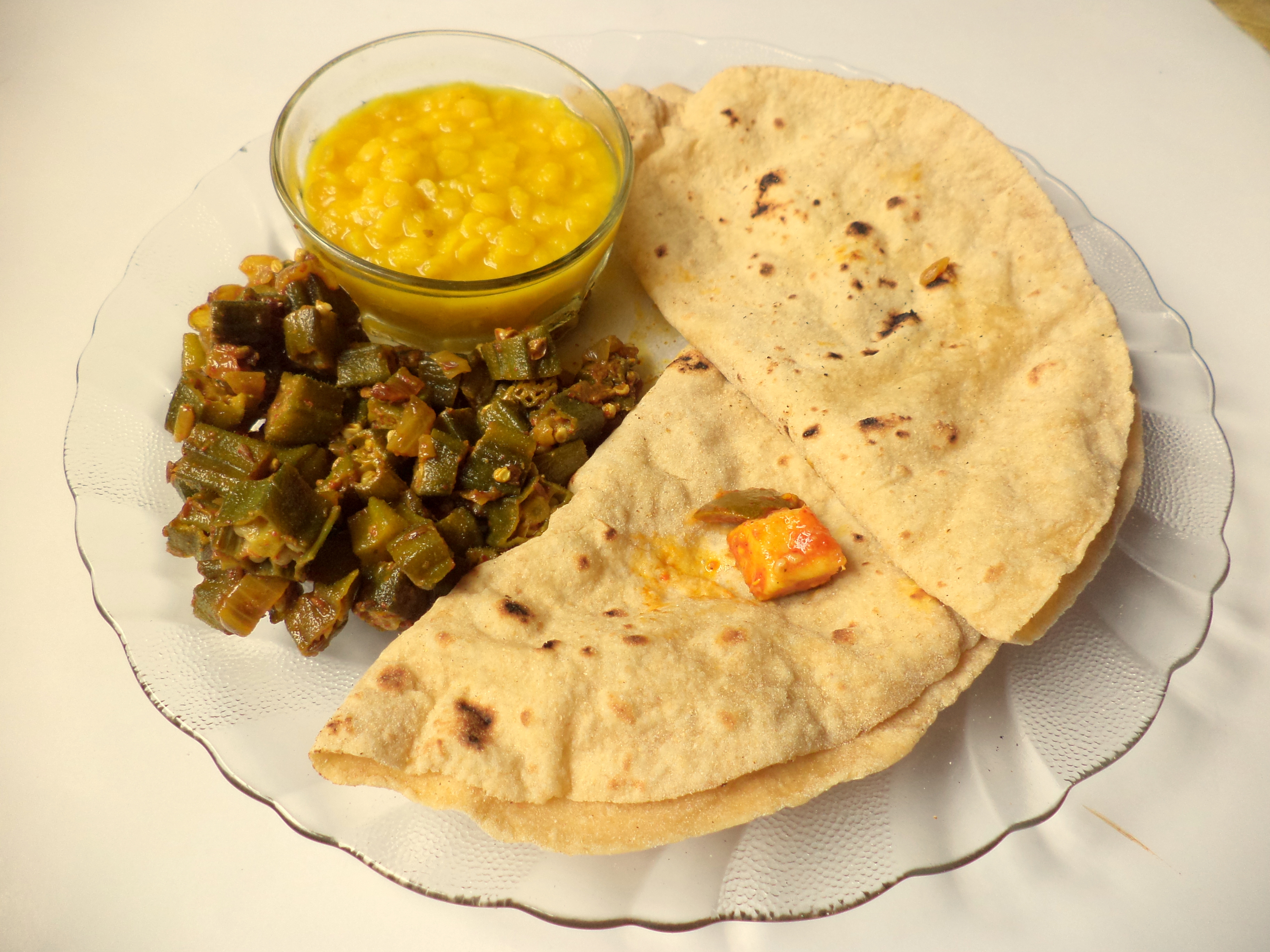
Plain dal served with roti, sauteed okra and green-mango pickle.

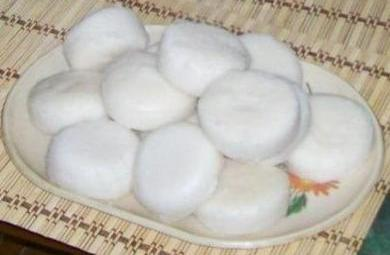
Idlis, steamed rice and black lentil cakes

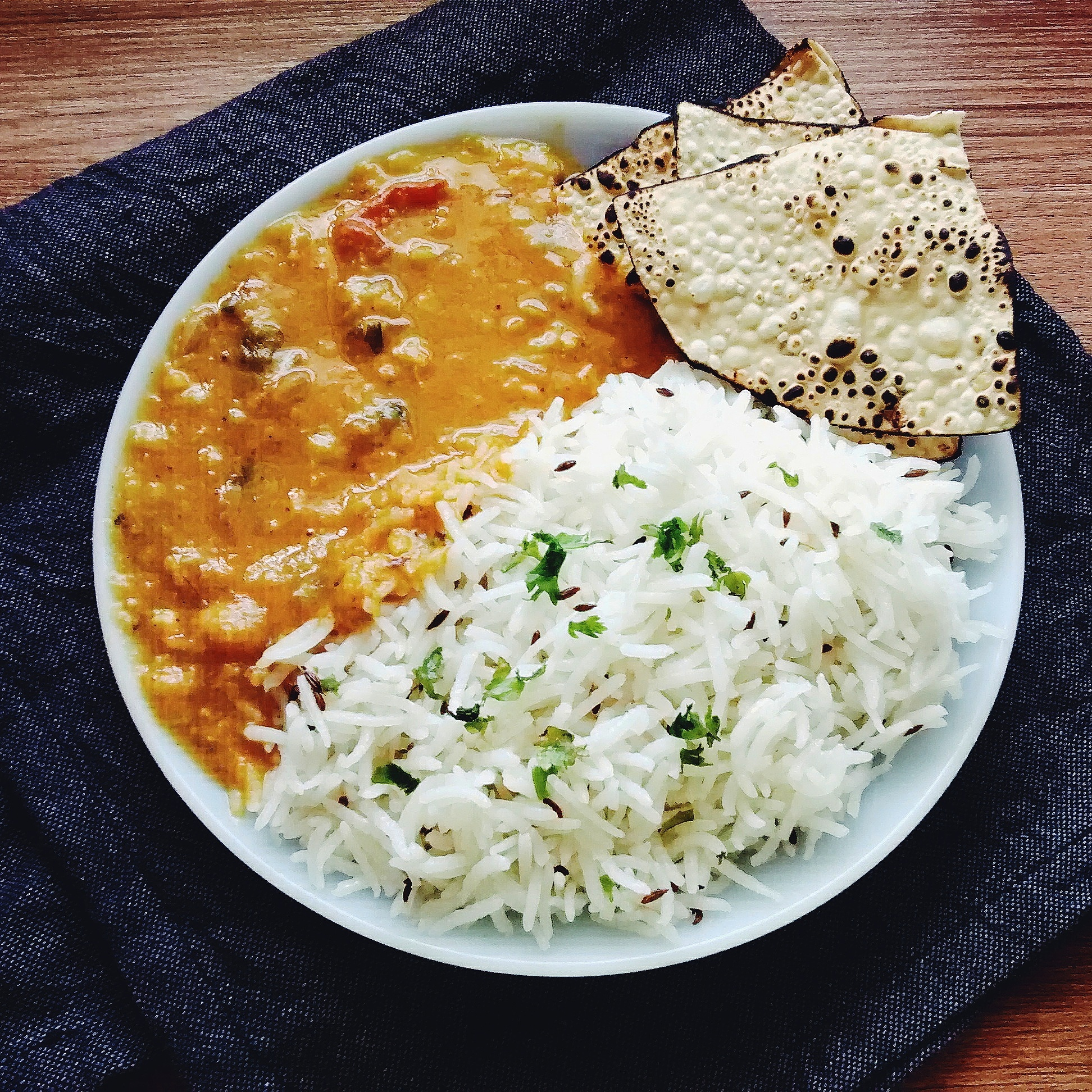
Dal tadka served with rice and papadam, a staple meal in the Indian subcontinent

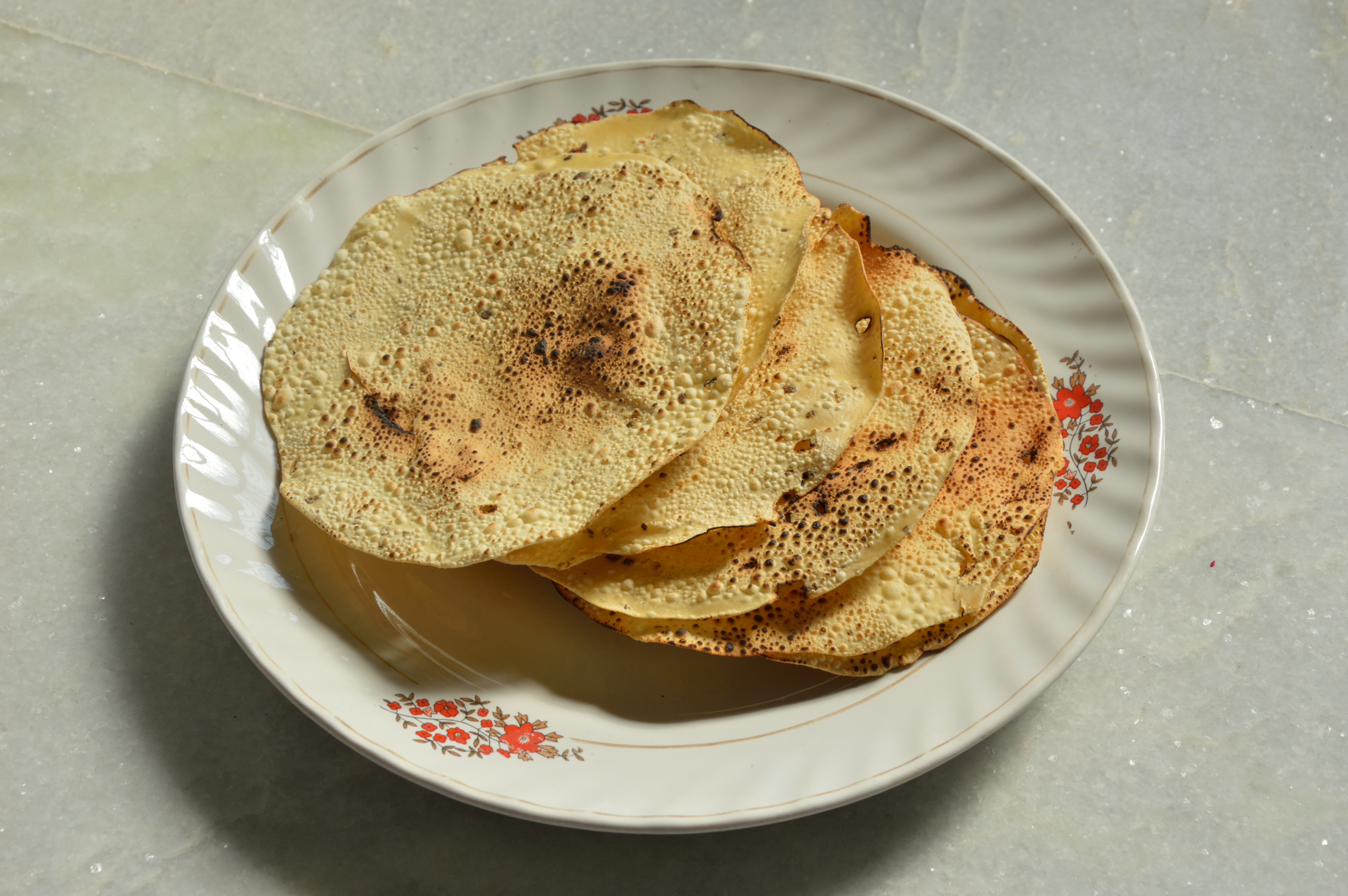
Fire-toasted papads, using lentils as a major ingredient

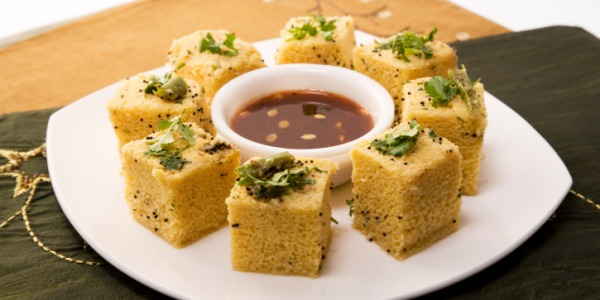
Dhokla, a steamed, fermented chana dal snack using lentils

== See also ==
- Dal bhat
- Dal bati churma
- Dal biji
- Ezogelin soup
- Fasole bătută
- Lentil soup
- Monggo (Philippine version of dal)
- Pea soup
