= Dal biji =

Indian snack

- Place of origin: India
- Main ingredients: Gram flour, cantaloupe and musk melon seeds

Dal biji is an Indian snack made of crispy gram flour noodles, pink masoor dal and melon seeds.
