= Eish fino =

Baguette-shaped bread roll from Egypt made with wheat flour

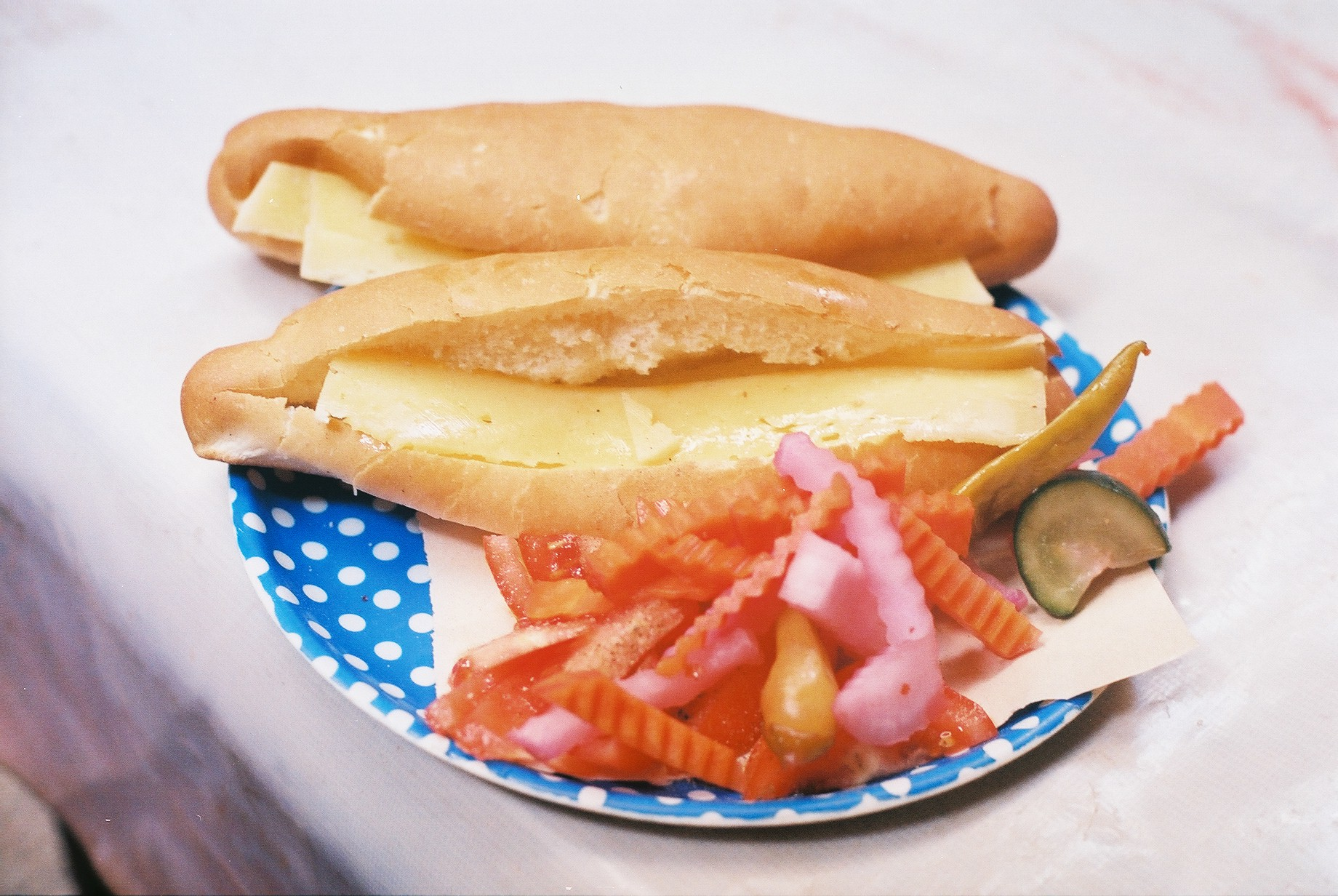
- Slices of rumi cheese in eish fino served with a side of torshi in Downtown Cairo
- Type: Bread roll
- Place of origin: Egypt
- Main ingredients: Wheat flour

Eish fino (Egyptian Arabic: عيش فينو) is a long baguette-shaped bread roll from Egypt made with wheat flour. It is the most commonly consumed bread type in the country after eish baladi, the staple flatbread. It has a soft texture and is often cut open to allow for fillings, common ones include various cheeses, halawa or fried cow liver. The loaves are thin and long, usually around 20 centimeters in length. The width on the other hand can vary greatly, but bakeries rarely make them wider than a few centimeters.

== Variations and similar dishes ==
Similar bread rolls can be found in different countries across the Arab world, fino bread may go by different names in different countries, such as "samoon" (not to be confused with samoon), "samoli" or "hamam" bread.

== See also ==
- Egyptian cuisine
