= Rumi cheese =

Egyptian cheese

Rumi
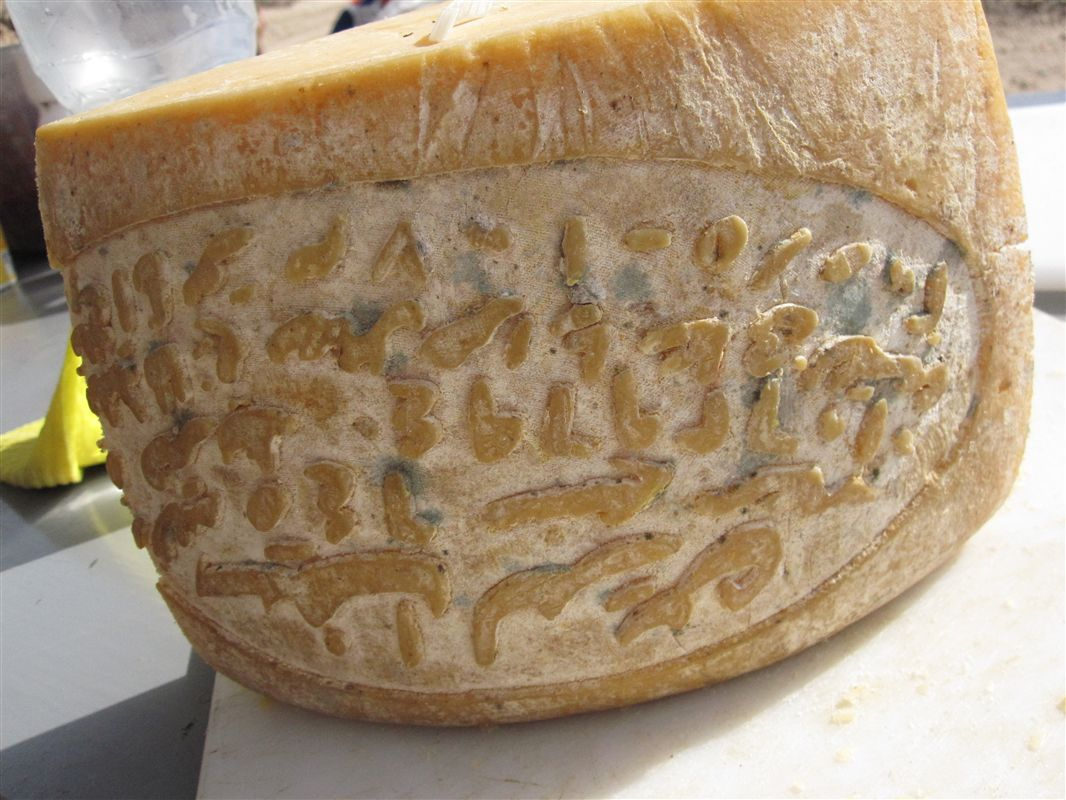
- Other names: Gebna Torky
- Country of origin: Egypt
- Pasteurized: No
- Texture: Hard/Crumbly
- Weight: 10 kg discs

Rumi cheese (Egyptian Arabic: جبنة رومى gebna Rumi [ˈɡebnæ ˈruːmi], also spelled roumi/roomi) is one of the main types of cheese in Egypt. Despite its name (Rūmī, literally "Roman"), the cheese is Egyptian. It has a pungent smell, and different degrees of saltiness depending on the age. It is also known, e.g. in the United Arab Emirates, as Ras cheese.

== Description ==
Rumi is the main hard cheese in Egypt. It belongs to the same family as pecorino romano and manchego. Rumi cheese is made from cows' milk, or from buffalo milk. No starter culture is used. The milk is natural, with full cream. Peppercorns may be added. After 3–4 months the cheese develops an open texture and a sharp, pungent flavor. Rumi is available in ten-kilogram (22 lb) discs or as slices with variable weight in vacuum packing. A reference serving of 30 grams (1 oz) provides about 400 kilojoules (100 kcal) of food energy, with about 28% saturated fat.

== Related products ==
The addition of low levels of pregastric esterase (used in blue cheese production) or lipases from R. miehei or R. pusillus has been reported to improve the flavor of ras and domiati cheeses. In 1985 an experimental Ras cheese was made using equal amounts by volume of cow and buffalo milk, plus an additional 20% to 30% of soy milk. The fat content was lower than natural cheese, and the flavor was affected slightly, but the aged result was said to have "satisfactory sensory properties". Although the fermented cheese mish is traditionally made from Areesh cheese, commercial products similar to mish may be made from ras and domiati cheeses.

== See also ==
- Egyptian cuisine
- List of cheeses
- Areesh cheese
- Domiati
