= Mish =

Traditional Egyptian cheese

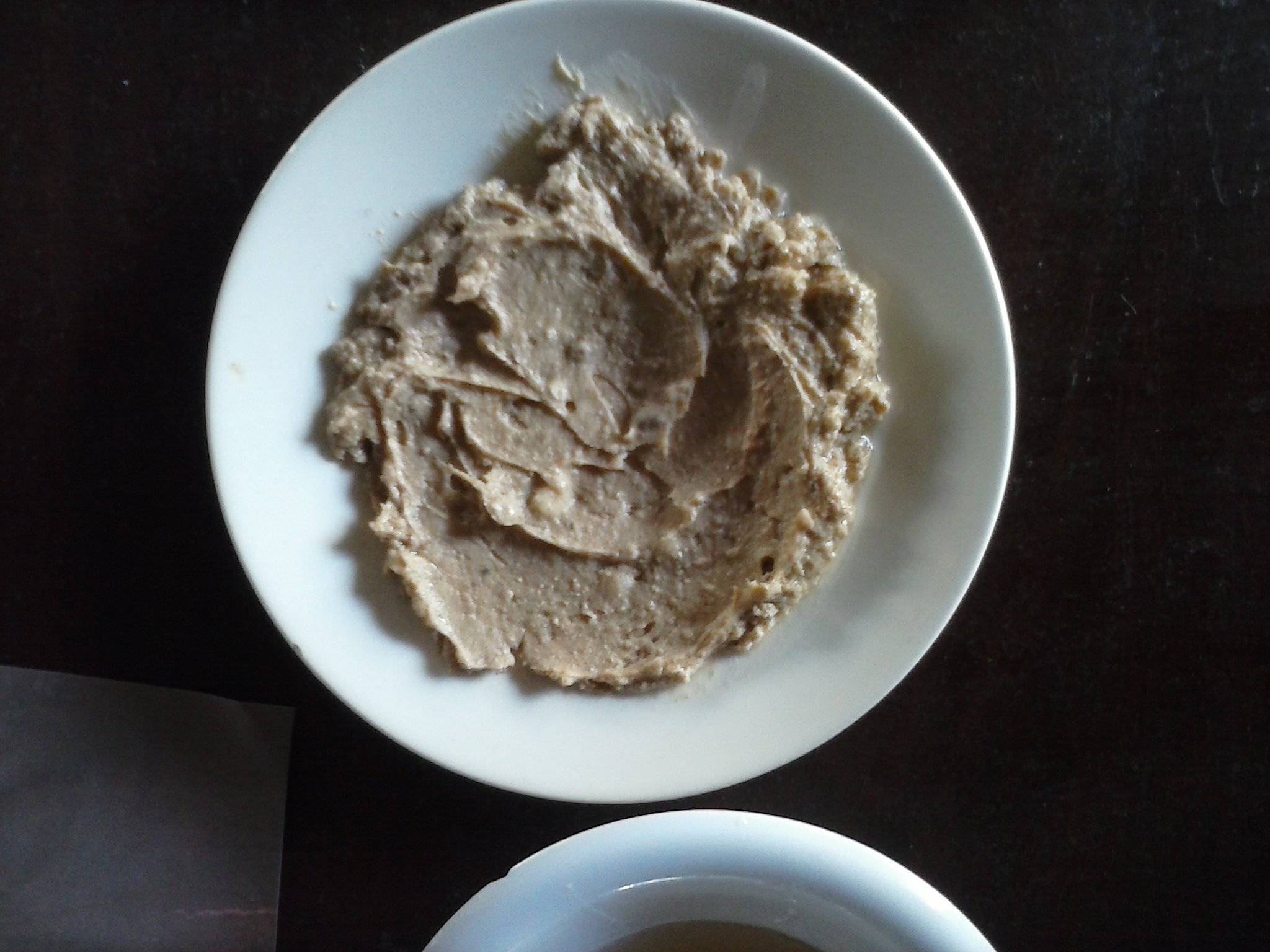
- Country of origin: Egypt
- Pasteurized: No
- Texture: Soft, no eyeholes
- Dimensions: 10 by 15 cm (3.9 by 5.9 in)
- Weight: 150 to 200 grams (5.3 to 7.1 oz)

Mish (Egyptian Arabic: مش meš [meʃ]) is a traditional Egyptian cheese that is made by fermenting salty cheese for several months or years.

Mish may be similar to cheese that has been found in the tomb of the First Dynasty Pharaoh Hor-Aha at Saqqara, from 3200 BC. It is generally prepared at home, although some is sold in local markets. When ripe it is a yellowish-brown color, and tastes sharp, salty and pungent. Products similar to mish are made commercially from different types of Egyptian cheese such as Domiati or Rumi, with different aging times.

== Preparation ==
Mish is usually made at home from Areesh cheese. The cheese is drained, rinsed and layered with salt in an earthenware jar. The jar is then filled with a pickling solution of buttermilk, sour skim milk, whey, red and green peppers. Some old mish is added to start the fermentation. The sealed container is then left for a year or more at ambient temperature. The container may be opened so that some can be removed for consumption, and fresh cheese and other ingredients added, so there is no particular limit to the age of mish.

== In popular culture ==
The phrase, "it's everywhere, like mish" means that something is common. Tiny worms often breed in the mish, but are not dangerous. The saying "the worms of the mish arise from it" means it is a problem that cannot be solved, but is not worth worrying about.

== See also ==
- Chancliche
- List of cheeses
