= Shʿifurah =

Syrian dish

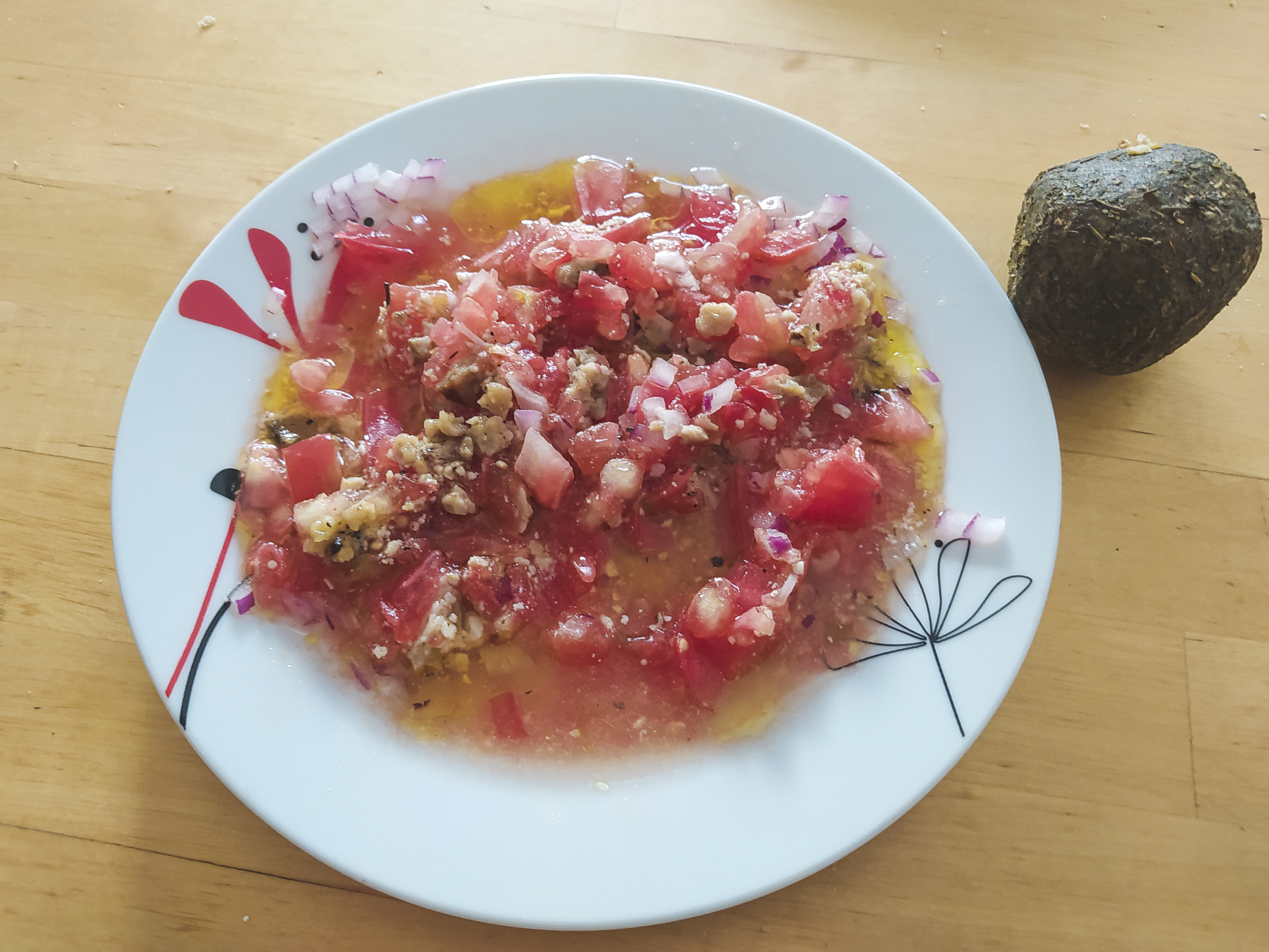
- shʿifurah with a shanklish ball on the side
- Type: salad
- Course: mezze
- Place of origin: Syria
- Main ingredients: shanklish, tomato, onion, olive oil, salt

Shaʿifūra (شعيفورة) or jaʿifūra (جعيفورة) is a Syrian salad consisting of shanklish cheese with chopped tomato, onion and olive oil.

Shanklīsh or sourkah is an intensely flavored ball-shape cheese that has been cured with thyme. Shaʿifūra salad has a popular origin, and in each home it is prepared in a different way. It may also include cucumber, green pepper, carrot, parsley or fresh mint, all finely chopped. It is served as a mezze for breakfast or dinner. In restaurants in Banyas, Tartous or Latakia and other villages of the coastal area of Syria, shaʿifūra is served to customers as an appetiser.

In the last century, people from the coast repopulated central Syria (Homs, Hama and Salamiya), bringing their taste for shanklīsh and shaʿifūra. It is also known as bāzarkān (بازركان), a name possibly of Kurdish origin, and is sometimes called simply shanklish salad (سلطة شنكليش).

It is the most common way to serve shanklīsh, as the sweet taste of the tomato contrasts with the cheese. Because of its strong flavor, shanklīsh is known as الروكفور الشامي al-rukafur al-shami ("Syrian Roquefort").

== See also ==
- Levantine cuisine
- List of salads
- Qrymutah
