= Shanklish =

Traditional Levantine cheese

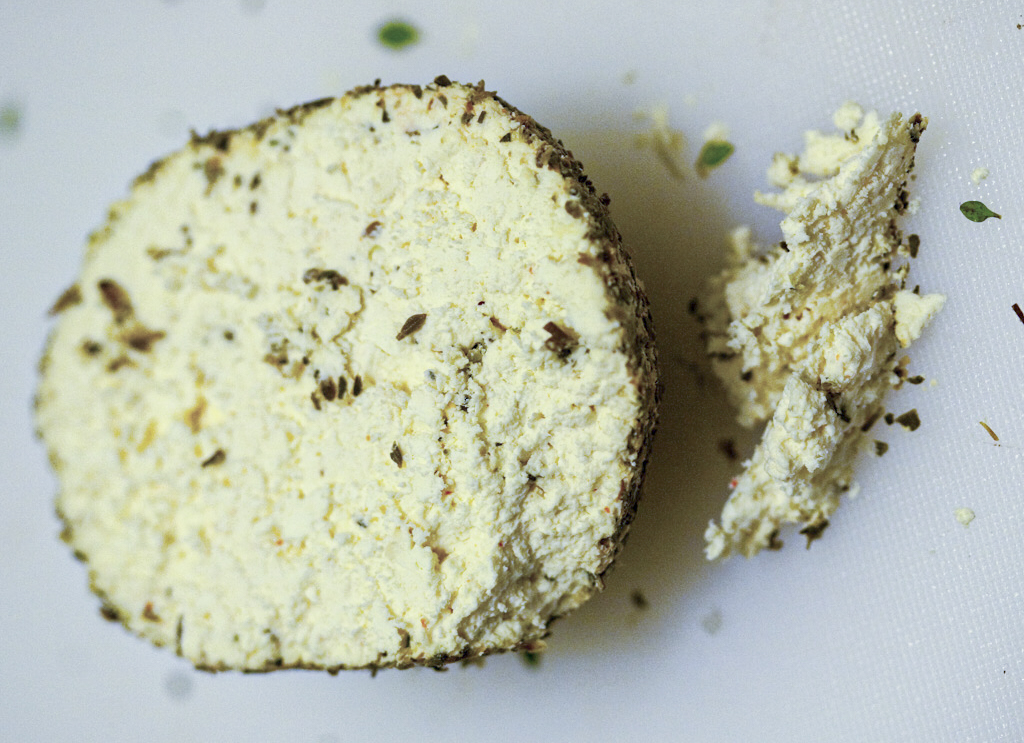
- Region: Syria, Lebanon, Turkey, and the Middle East
- Source of milk: Cow or sheep

Shanklish (Arabic: شَنْكلِيش shanklīsh or شنغليش shanghlīsh), also known as chancliche, shinklish, shankleesh, sorke, sürke, or eddesh, is a type of cow or sheep milk cheese in Levantine cuisine.

== Name ==
The origins of the name are not currently traceable; some hypothesize that it is of Turkish origin.

The word is attested in Arabic as early as the 19th century; an 1898 dictionary by Lebanese author Rasheed Atiyya defined shanklish as "thick sour milk".

== Preparation ==
Shanklish is made by curdling yogurt, straining it, and fermenting it. It is typically formed into balls of approximately 6 cm diameter, often covered in za'atar and Aleppo pepper, and then aged and dried.

The most common spice is thyme, which gives the cheese an appearance somewhat resembling a rum ball. Shanklish is also sold in much smaller balls or in an unformed state.

In Egypt, shanklish is made by fermenting areesh cheese, usually called mesh.

== Consumption ==
Commercial package shanklish

Shanklish varies greatly in its texture and flavour. Fresh cheeses have a soft texture and mild flavour; those dried and aged for a longer period become progressively harder and can acquire an extremely pungent odour and flavour. To make spicier cheeses, spices such as aniseed and chilli can be mixed in before the cheese is formed into balls. Spicy shanklish are often covered in chilli, especially in Syria, and thus appear red.

Shanklish from the Syrian coastal plain around Tartus and the adjoining northern Lebanese region of Akkar are considered particularly delectable; these tend to be hard, with a clean strong flavour and near-white colour.

Shanklish is generally eaten with finely-chopped tomato, onion and olive oil in a dish called shʿifurah, and often accompanied by araq. It is a common meze dish. Shanklish is also mashed up with eggs or in a pita with cucumbers, mint leaves and olive oil for breakfast.

== Culture ==
The Guinness world record for heaviest piece of shanklish was set in 2008, in Syria, weighing over 200 kilograms.
