= Laban rayeb =

Curdled skim milk produced in the Delta and Upper Egypt

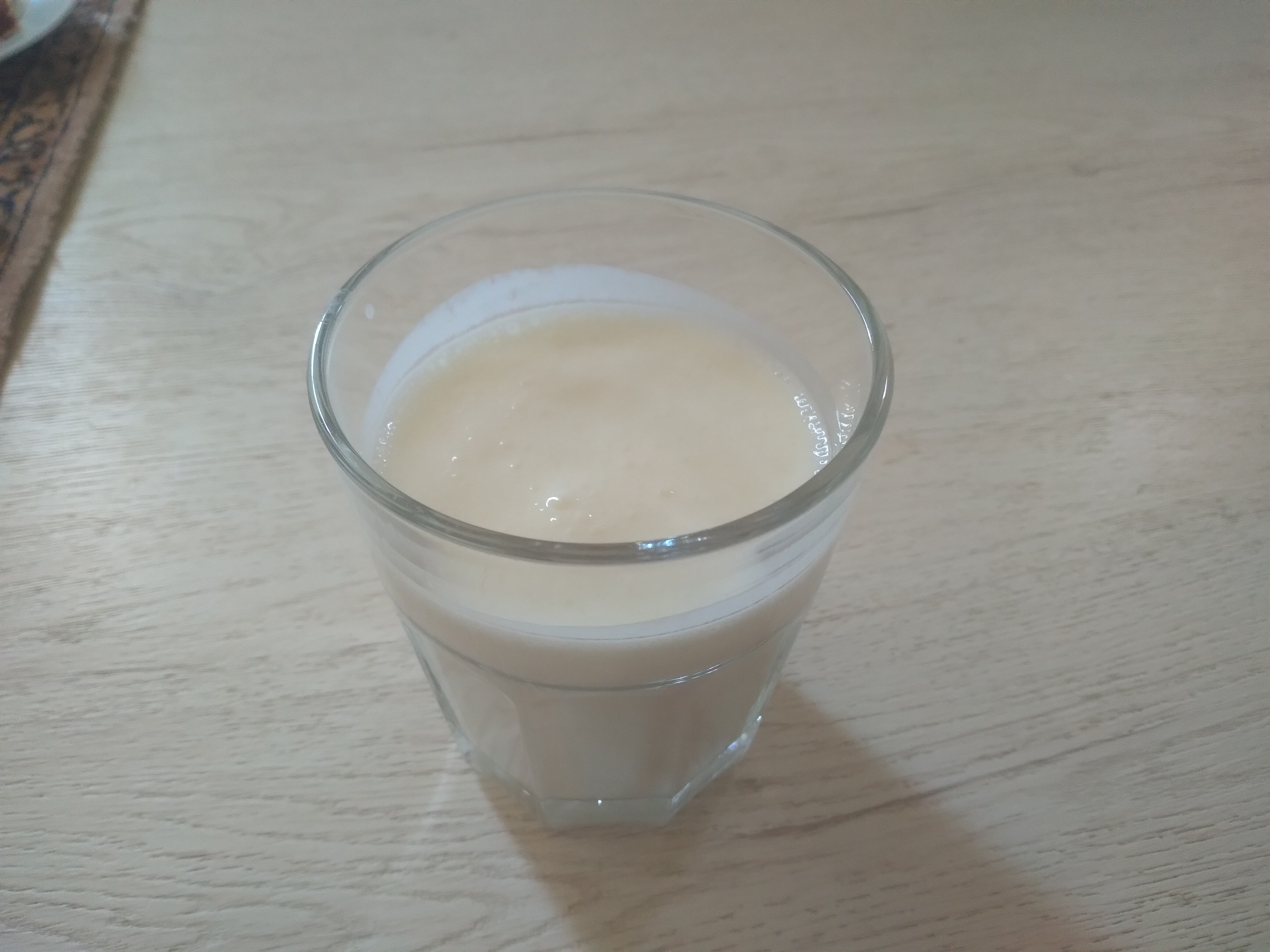
- Country of origin: Egypt
- Region: Nile Delta, Lower Egypt
- Pasteurised: No
- Texture: Liquid

Laban rayeb (Egyptian Arabic: لبن رايب) is a type of curdled skim and fermented milk made in Upper Egypt. It may be drunk fresh or may be used to make areesh cheese, which in turn is used to make mish.

== Preparation ==
The traditional way to make laban rayeb starts with milking cows directly into partially sterilized shallow or deep earthenware pots. The inside of a newly made pot (matared) is soaked in oil or a mixture of egg white and oil and then baked in a kiln to close the pores. After each use the matared is washed and dried in a hot oven for two hours. The milk is left for one to four days, depending on the temperature, while the fat rises to the top and the milk below curdles. The milk is kept at 20–25 °C (68–77 °F) while the curd forms. The milk is not disturbed while its natural microflora ferments it. The fat is scooped out and used to make butter. The remaining curd is the laban rayab. It smells similar to buttermilk, and has a slightly acid taste.

== Variants and derived products ==
Laban khad is a variant that is fermented in a goat pelt. Goubasha is a traditional drink in the Sudan. Some cream is added to laban rayeb made from buffalo milk, and the mixture is then diluted with water. Laban zeer is another variant made in earthenware pots. It may be mixed with boiled, dried and ground wheat grains, fermented for twenty four hours, then sundried to make Kishk. This is a very nutritious food that may keep for several years.

Karish cheese is made from laban rayeb by pouring the curd onto a reed mat and letting it drain, occasionally spreading it and squeezing it in the mat, and then hanging it for two or three days. Shortly before being finished the cheese is dry-salted, and then hung in the mat for a few more hours.

== History ==
There is evidence that it was made by the ancient Egyptians.
