= Egyptian cheese =

Cheeses made in Egypt

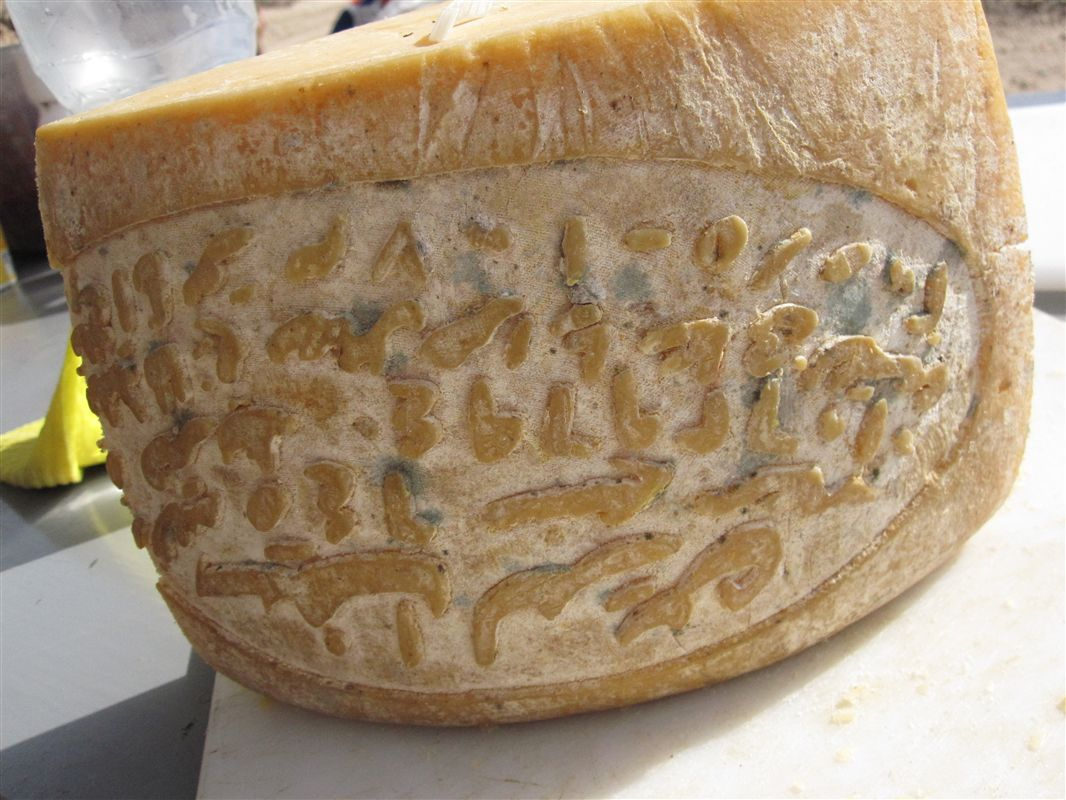
Rumi cheese

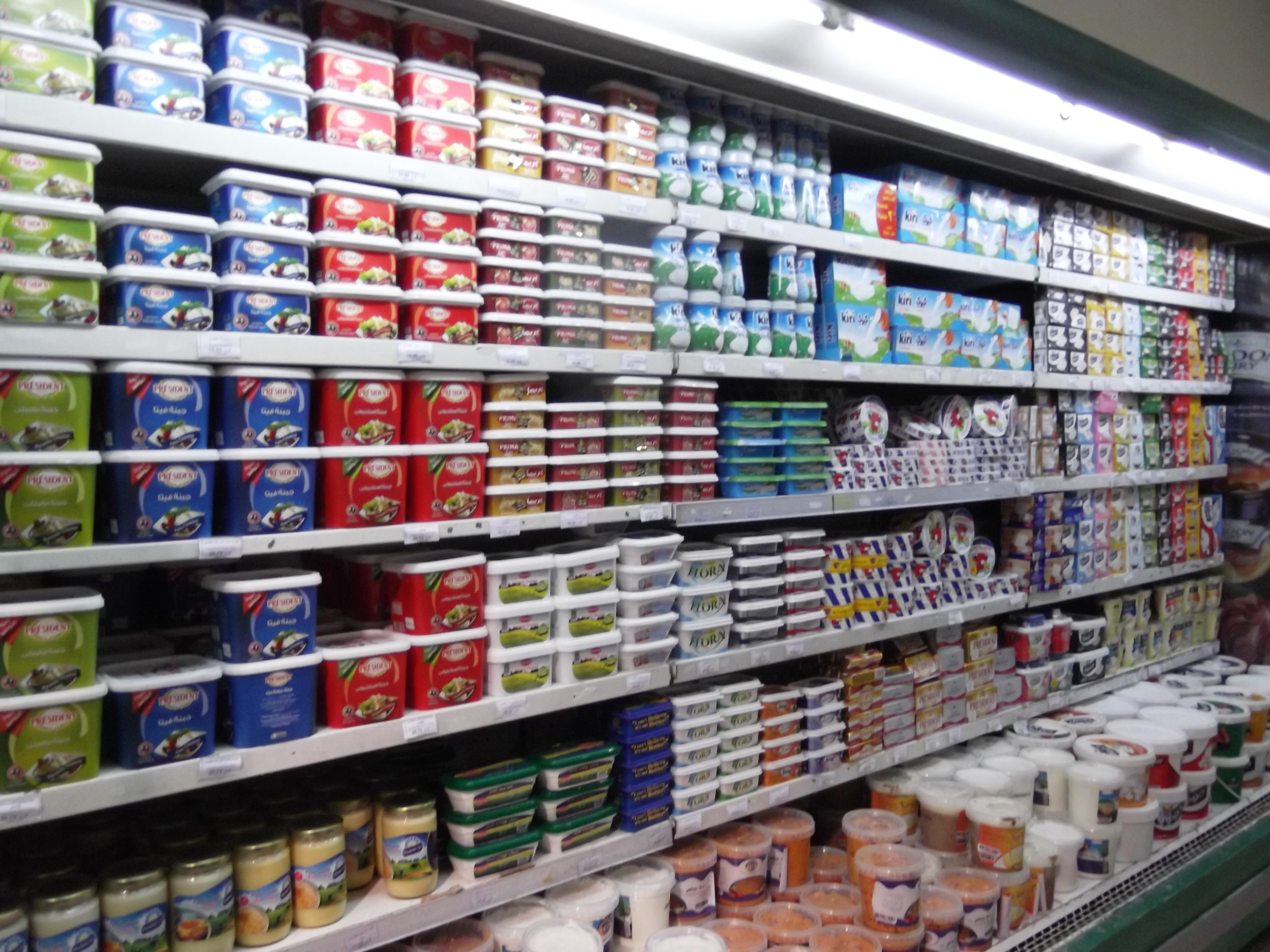
Mass-produced cheeses in an Egyptian supermarket

Egyptian cheese (Egyptian Arabic: جبنة, romanized: gebna, pronounced [ˈɡebnæ]) has a long history, and continues to be an important part of the Egyptian diet. There is evidence of cheese-making over 5,000 years ago in the time of the First Dynasty of Egypt. In the Middle Ages, the city of Damietta was famous for its soft, white cheese. Cheese was also imported, and the common hard yellow cheese, rumi, takes its name from the Arabic word for "Roman". Although many rural people still make their own cheese, notably the fermented mish, mass-produced cheeses are becoming more common. Cheese is often served with breakfast, and is included in several traditional dishes, including some desserts.

== History ==
=== Ancient Egypt ===
Two alabaster jars found at Saqqara, dating from the First Dynasty of Egypt, contained cheese. These were placed in the tomb about 3,000 BC. They were likely fresh cheeses coagulated with acid or a combination of acid and heat. An earlier tomb, that of King Hor-Aha may also have contained cheese which, based on the hieroglyphic inscriptions on the two jars, appear to be from Upper and Lower Egypt. The pots are similar to those used today when preparing mish.

Cottage cheese was made in ancient Egypt by churning milk in a goatskin and then straining the residue using a reed mat. The Museum of Ancient Egyptian Agriculture displays fragments of these mats. A mural from the tomb of Ipuy (TT217) has been interpreted as depicting a goatherd churning of milk in a goatskin, while a woman handles cheese as white balls.

In the 3rd century BC there are records of imported cheese from the Greek island of Chios, with a twenty-five percent import tax being charged.

=== Middle Ages ===
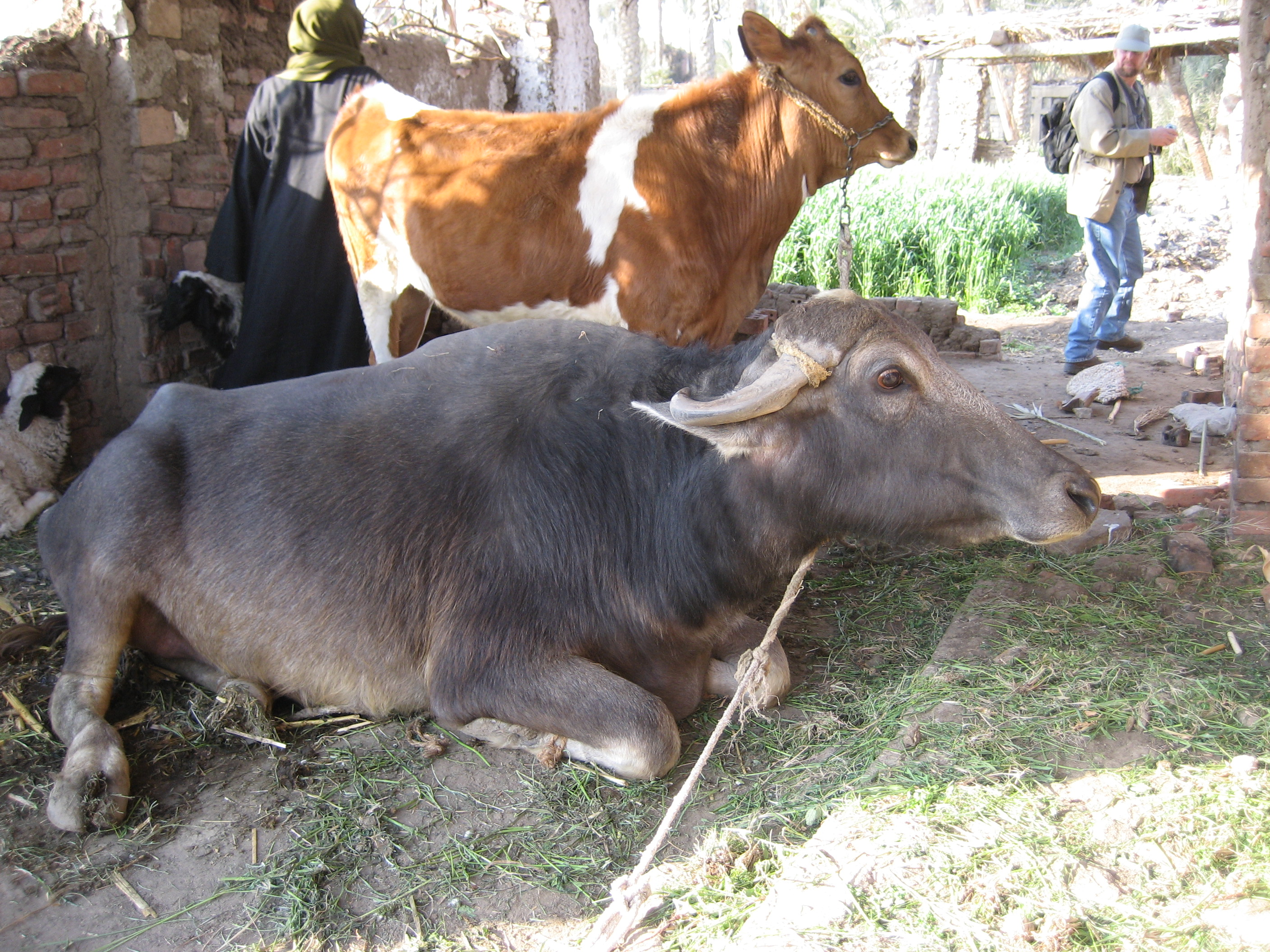
In Egypt water buffaloes and cattle are the two sources of milk used for domiati cheese.

According to the medieval philosopher Al-Isra'ili, in his day there were three types of cheese: "a moist fresh cheese which was consumed on the same day or close to it; there was an old dry cheese; and there was a medium one in between." The first would have been unripened cheese made locally from sour milk, which may or may not have been salted. The old dry cheeses would have often been imported, and were cheeses ripened by rennet enzymes or bacteria. The nature of the "medium" cheese is less certain, and may have referred to preserved fresh cheeses, evaporated milk or cheese similar to Indian paneer, where the addition of vegetable juices makes the milk coagulate.

Medieval Egyptian cheese mostly used buffalo or cows' milk, with less use of goat and sheep milk than in other countries of the region. Damietta on the Mediterranean coast was the primary area where cheese was made for consumption in other parts of the country. Damietta was well known not just for its buffaloes but also for its Khaysiyya cows, from which Kaysi cheese was made. Khaysi cheese is mentioned as early as the eleventh century A.D. A fifteenth century author describes the cheese being washed, which may imply that it was salted in brine. It may therefore have been an ancestor of modern Dumyati cheese, produced today in the Damietta district. Fried cheese (جبنة مقلية gebna maqleyya) was a common food in Egypt in the Middle Ages, cooked in oil and served with bread by street vendors. Fried cheese was eaten by both poor and rich, and was considered a delicacy by some of the Mamluk sultans.

A 17th-century writer described mishsh as the "blue qarish cheese which was kept for so long that it cut off the mouse's tail with its burning sharpness and the power of its saltiness". The Egyptian peasants ate this cheese with bread, leeks, or green onions as a staple part of their diet. It seems that the mishsh made and eaten by country people today is essentially the same cheese. The Egyptians also imported cheese from Sicily, Crete and Syria in the Middle Ages.

=== Recent years ===
Production of pickled cheeses rose from 171,000 tonnes in 1981 to 293,000 tonnes in 2000, almost all consumed locally. Imports of cheese to Egypt peaked at 29,000 tonnes in 1990, but with establishment of modern factories the volume of imports had dropped to under 1,000 tonnes by 2002. Between 1984 and 2007 production of cheese of all types in Egypt rose steadily from about 270,000 tonnes to over 400,000 tonnes. In 1991 roughly half of the cheese was still made using traditional methods in rural areas, and the other half was made using modern processes. The common Domiati cheese was being manufactured by private dairies using small milk batches of 500 kilograms (1,100 lb), and in large government plants in five tonne batches. The government owned Misr Milk and Food Co. had nine plants with an annual capacity of 13,000 to 150,000 tonnes of dairy products.

Annual consumption of pickled cheeses was estimated at 4.4 kilograms (9.7 lb) in 2000. In 2002 it was estimated that more than one third of Egyptian milk production was used in making traditional pickled cheeses or ultrafiltered feta-type cheeses. The domiati cheese now contains less buffalo milk than in the past. The fat from cows' milk is replaced in part by vegetable oils to reduce cost and retain the white color expected by consumers. Various other changes have been introduced such as mandatory heat treatment of the milk, but manufacturers have striven to retain the familiar taste, texture and appearance of the cheeses.

== Cuisine ==
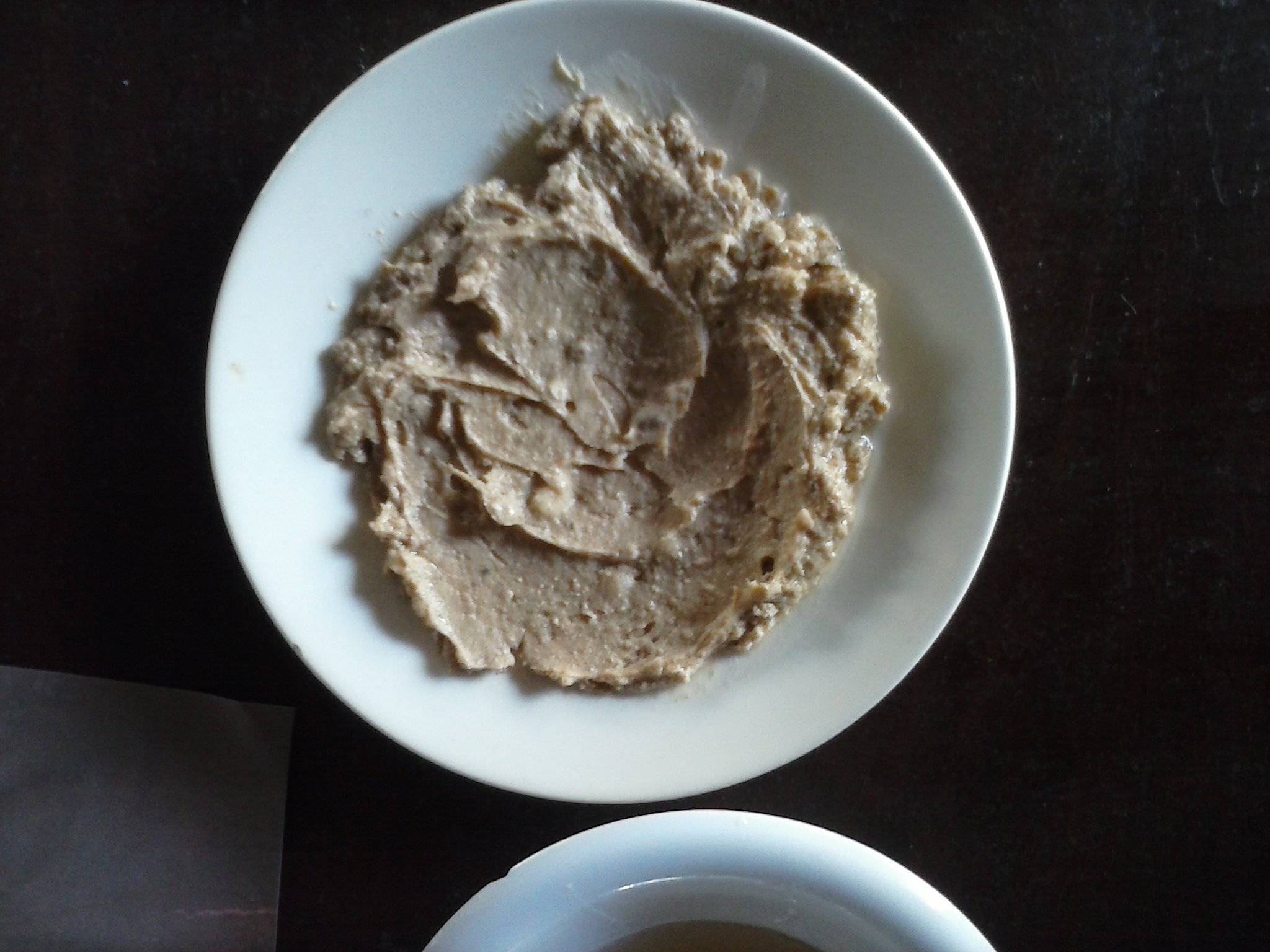
Mish, a fermented cheese that is a staple in Egypt.

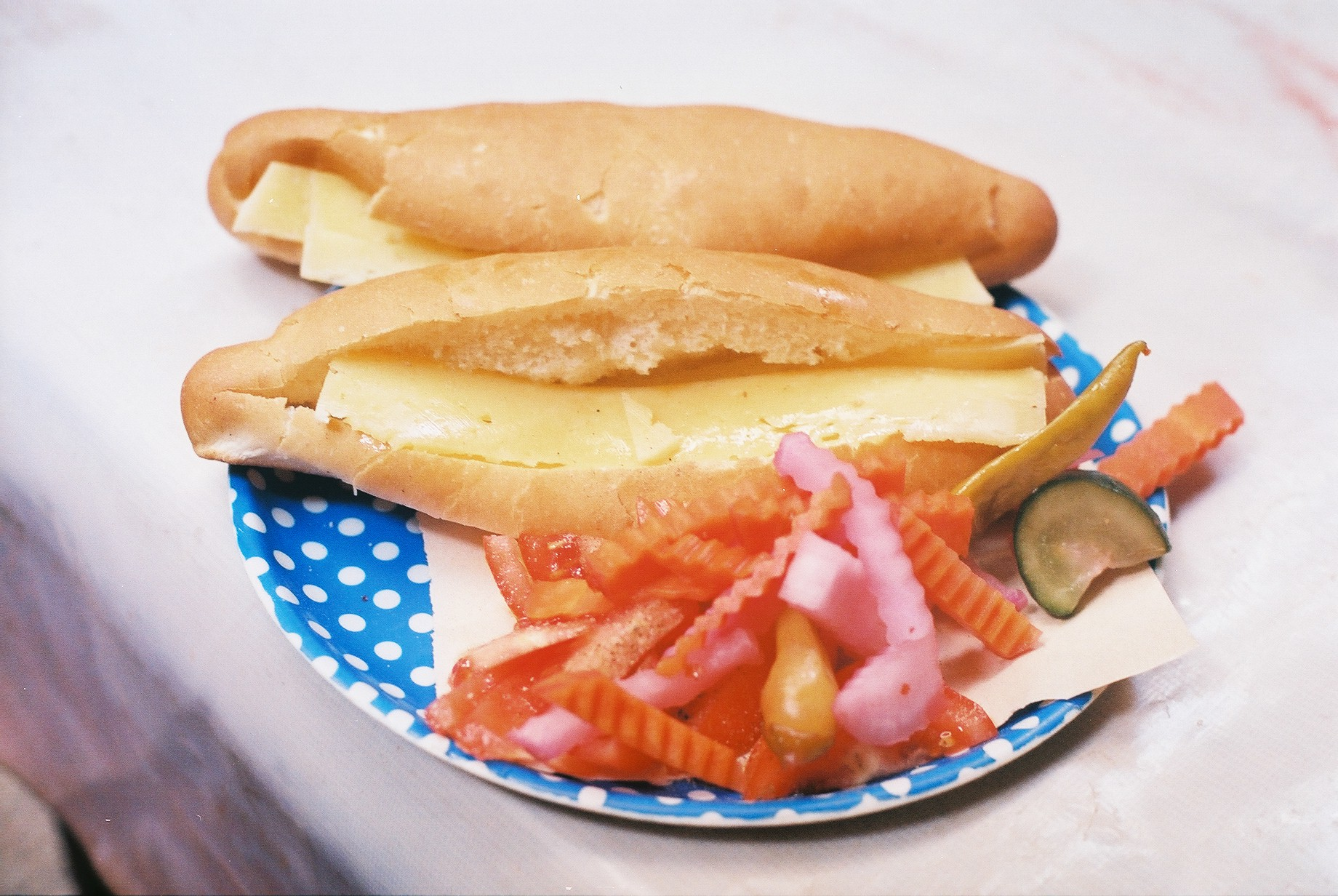
Slices of rumi cheese sandwich with pickles in Downtown Cairo

Cheese is often served with breakfast in Egypt, along with bread, jams and olives. Various types of soft, white cheeses (categorically referred to as gebna bēḍa) and gebna rūmi may be eaten in ēish fīno, a small baguette, or with ēish baladi, a flatbread that forms the backbone Egyptian cuisine. White cheeses and mish are also often served at the start of a multi-course meal alongside various appetizers, or muqabilat, and bread.

Fiteer is a flaky filo pastry with a stuffing or topping that may include white cheese and peppers, ground meat, egg, onions and olives. Sambusak is a flaky pastry that may be stuffed with cheese, meat or spinach.

Qatayef, a dessert commonly served during the month of Ramadan, is of Fatimid origin. It is often prepared by street vendors in Egypt. Qatayef are pancakes stuffed with nuts or soft cheese, deep fried and covered in syrup. In Egypt, Ibn al-Qata'if, or "son of the pancake maker" is an Egyptian Jewish family name.

== Cheese varieties ==
English	Egyptian Arabic	Description
Areesh cheese	اريش	A type of white, soft, lactic cheese made from laban rayeb.
Baramili	براميلي	A type of white cheese aged in barrels, the name translates to barrel cheese in English.
Domiati	دمياطي	A soft white cheese usually made from cow or buffalo milk. It is salted, heated, coagulated using rennet and then ladled into wooden molds where the whey is drained away for three days. The cheese may be eaten fresh, or stored in salted whey for up to eight months, then matured in brine. Domiati cheese accounts for about three quarters of the cheese made and consumed in Egypt. The cheese takes its name from the city of Damietta and is thought to have been made as early as 332 BC.
Halumi	حلومي	Similar to Cypriot halloumi, yet a different cheese. It may be eaten fresh or brined and spiced. The name comes from the Coptic word for cheese, "halum".
Istanbuli	اسطنبولي	A type of white cheese made from cow or buffalo milk, similar to feta cheese.
Mish	مش	A sharp and salty product made by fermenting cheese for several months in salted whey. It is an important part of the diet of farmers. Mish is often made at home from areesh cheese. Products similar to mish are made commercially from different types of Egyptian cheese such as domiati or rumi, with different ages.
Rumi	رومي	A hard, bacterially ripened variety of cheese. It belongs to the same family as Pecorino Romano and Manchego. It is salty, with a crumbly texture, and is sold at different stages of aging.

== See also ==
- List of cheeses
- Egyptian cuisine
