= Areesh cheese =

Soft and crumbly Egyptian cottage cheese

Areesh قريش
- Country of origin: Egypt
- Source of milk: Buffalo milk, cow milk
- Texture: Soft and crumbly

Areesh cheese (Egyptian Arabic: جبنة قريش gebna arish) is a traditional Egyptian dairy product similar to cottage cheese, characterized by its soft, white, and crumbly texture. It is commonly made from skimmed buffalo or cow's milk and holds a significant place in Egyptian cuisine. The name Areesh is sometimes used interchangeably with cottage cheese.

Areesh cheese is made by fermenting milk to create laban rayeb, a fermented skimmed milk. This fermented milk is then gently heated, causing the curds to separate from the whey. The curds are collected and drained, resulting in the formation of areesh cheese. This method yields a cheese similar in texture and appearance to cottage cheese.

The cheese is popular in multiple Arab countries. It can be consumed fresh, often topped with a drizzle of honey or with chopped tomatoes mixed with herbs and spices. Additionally, areesh cheese serves as the base for producing mish, a traditional fermented cheese eaten in Egypt. It is also used to prepare pastries, desserts, and shanklish.

== See also ==
- Mish
- Laban rayeb
- Cottage cheese
- Egyptian cuisine
- List of cheeses
