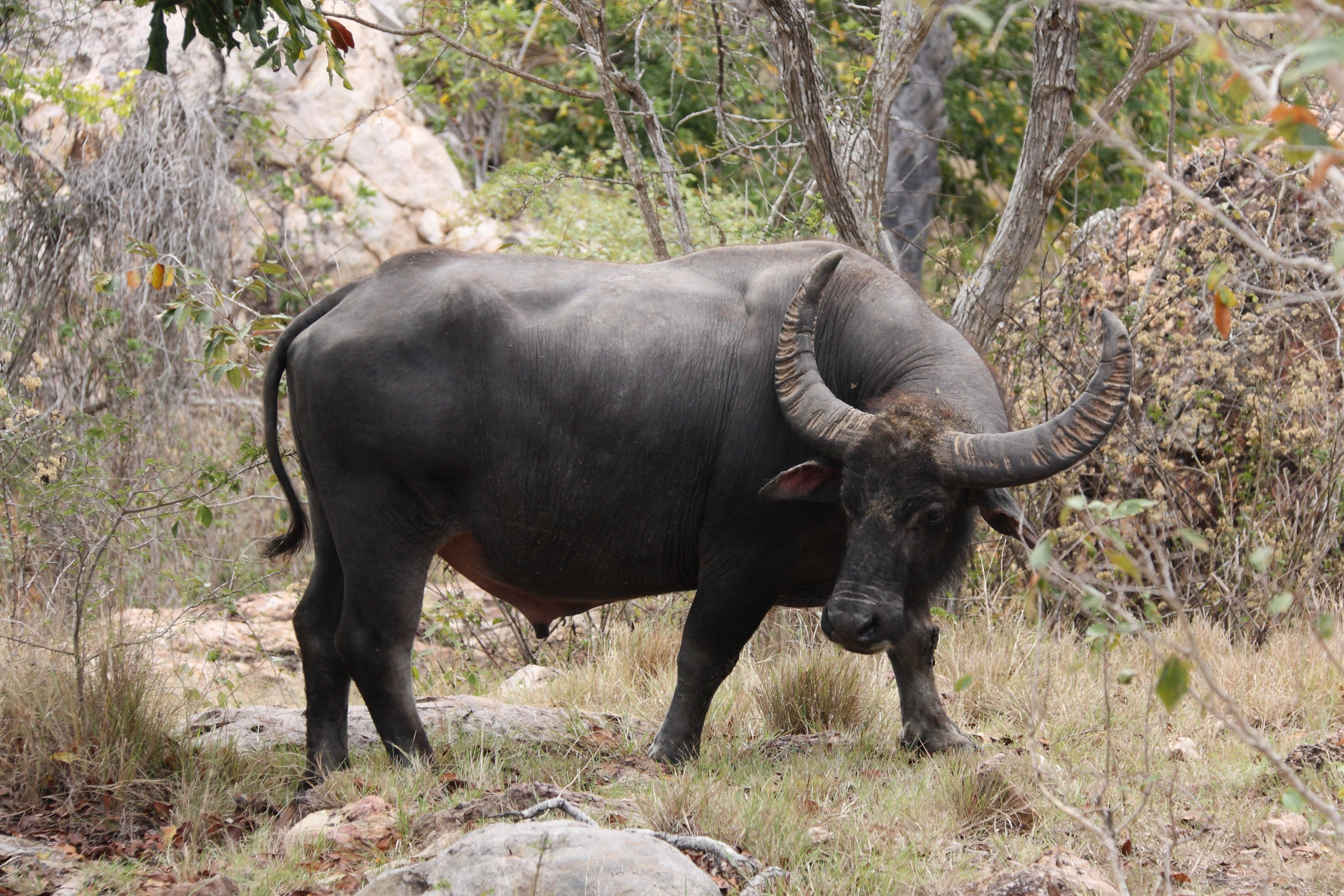
- Water buffalo at Rinca Island, Indonesia

Conservation status
- Domesticated

Scientific classification
- Kingdom: Animalia
- Phylum: Chordata
- Class: Mammalia
- Order: Artiodactyla
- Family: Bovidae
- Subfamily: Bovinae
- Genus: Bubalus
- Species: B. bubalis

Binomial name
- Bubalus bubalis (Linnaeus, 1758)
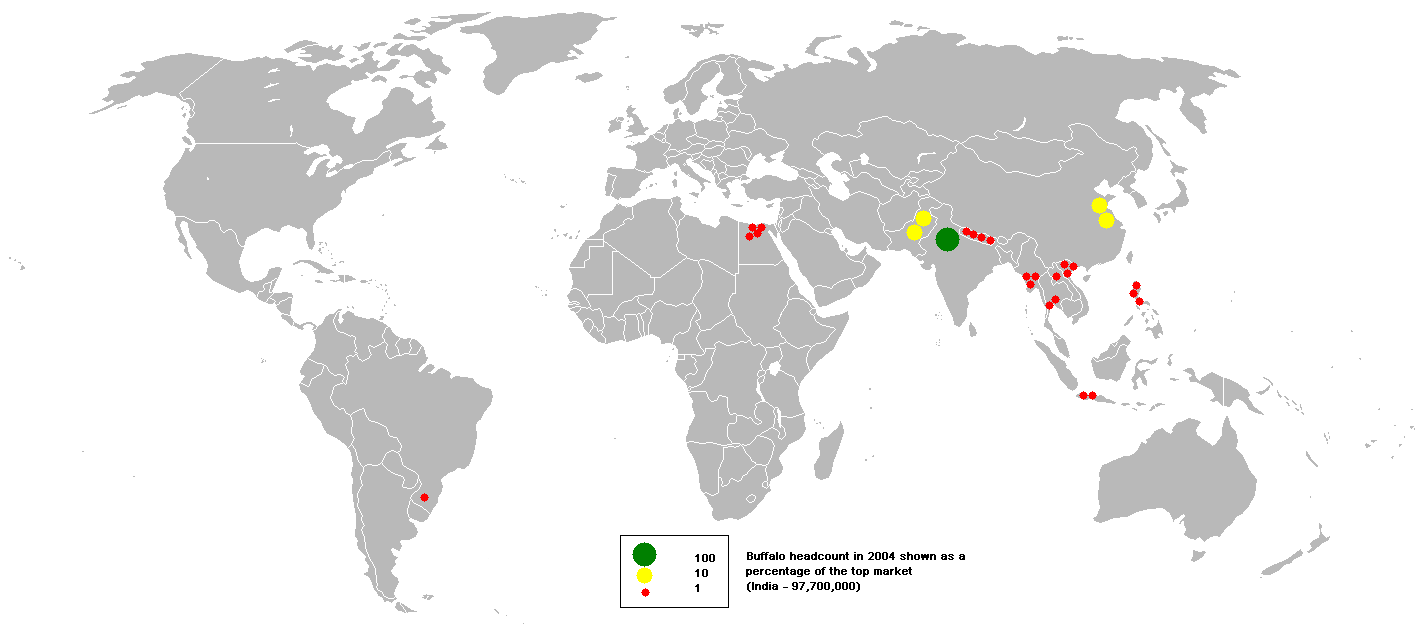
- Global distribution of the water buffalo in 2004

Synonyms
- Bos bubalis Linnaeus, 1758

= Water buffalo =

Species of large bovine

The water buffalo (Bubalus bubalis), also called domestic water buffalo, Asian water buffalo, and Asiatic water buffalo, is a large domesticated bovine originating in South and Southeast Asia descended from the wild water buffalo. Today, it is also kept in regions including Italy, the Balkans, Australia, the Americas, and parts of Africa. Two extant types of water buffalo are recognized, based on morphological and behavioural criteria: the river buffalo of the Indian subcontinent and further west to the Balkans, Egypt, and Italy; and the swamp buffalo from Assam in the west through Southeast Asia to the Yangtze Valley of China in the east.

The wild water buffalo (Bubalus arnee) is most probably the ancestor of the domestic water buffalo. Phylogenetic analysis indicates that the river-type water buffalo probably originated in western India and was domesticated about 6,300 years ago, whereas the swamp-type originated independently from Mainland Southeast Asia and was domesticated about 3,000 to 7,000 years ago. Subsequently, the river buffalo dispersed west as far as Egypt, the Balkans, and Italy; while swamp buffalo dispersed to the rest of Southeast Asia and up to the Yangtze Valley.

Water buffaloes were traded from the Indus Valley Civilisation to Mesopotamia, in modern Iraq, in 2500 BC by the Meluhhas. The seal of a scribe employed by an Akkadian king shows the sacrifice of water buffaloes.

Water buffaloes are especially suitable for tilling rice fields, and their milk is richer in fat and protein than that of dairy cattle. Feral populations have naturalised in several countries.

== Taxonomy ==
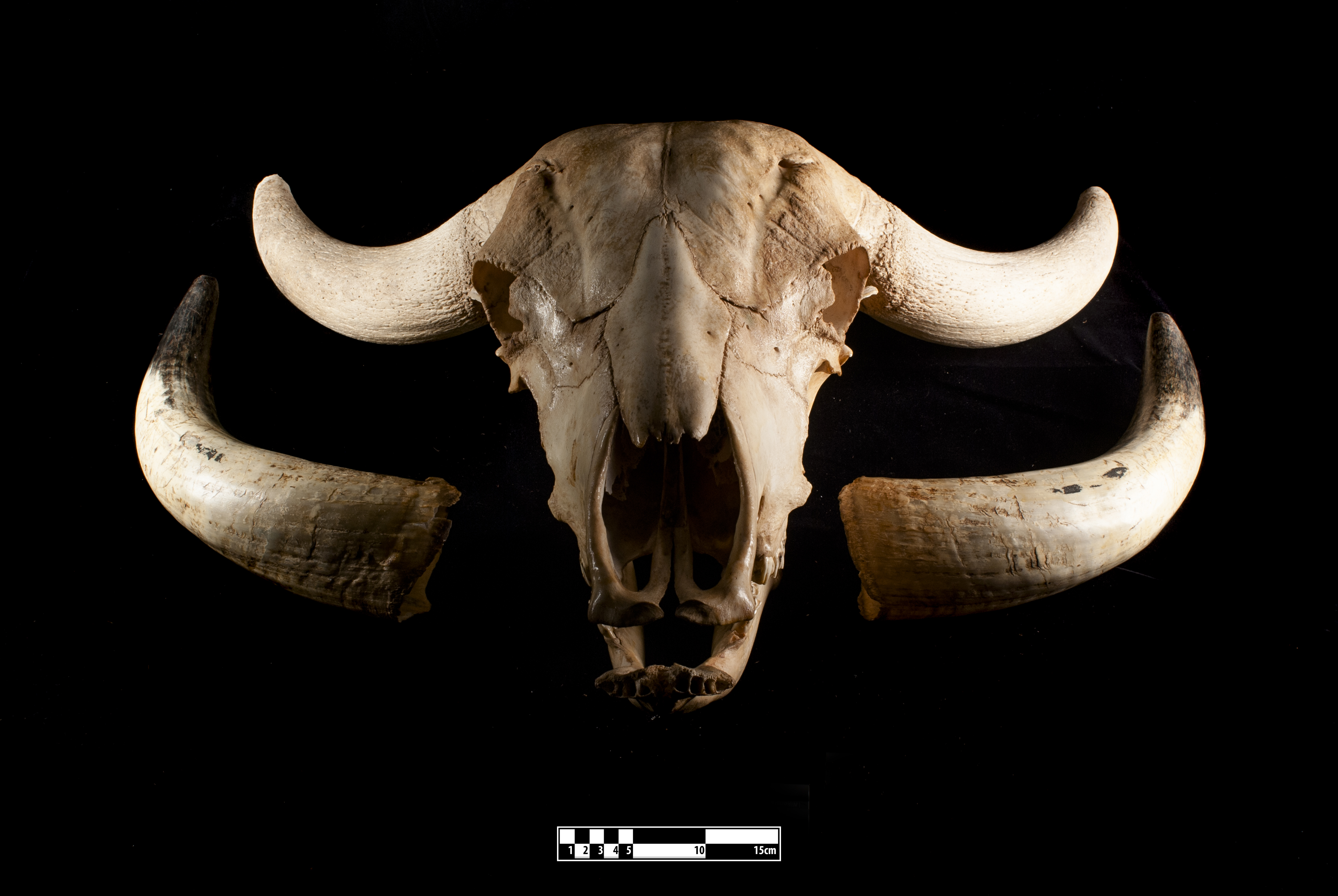
Skull and horns. Scale is 15 cm.

Carl Linnaeus first described the genus Bos and the water buffalo under the binomial Bos bubalis in 1758; the species was known to occur in Asia and was held as a domestic form in Italy. Ellerman and Morrison-Scott treated the wild and domestic forms of the water buffalo as conspecifics, whereas others treated them as different species. The nomenclatorial treatment of the wild and domestic forms has been inconsistent and varies between authors and even within the works of single authors.

In March 2003, the International Commission on Zoological Nomenclature achieved consistency in the naming of the wild and domestic water buffaloes by ruling that the scientific name Bubalus arnee is valid for the wild form. B. bubalis continues to be valid for the domestic form and applies also to feral populations.

In the early 1970s, different names were proposed for the river and swamp types of water buffaloes; the river type was referred to as Bubalus bubalis bubalis (Linnaeus, 1758), while the swamp type was referred to as Bubalus bubalis carabanensis (Castillo, 1971). However, Bubalus carabanensis is considered a junior synonym of Bubalus kerabau (Fitzinger, 1860).

== Characteristics ==
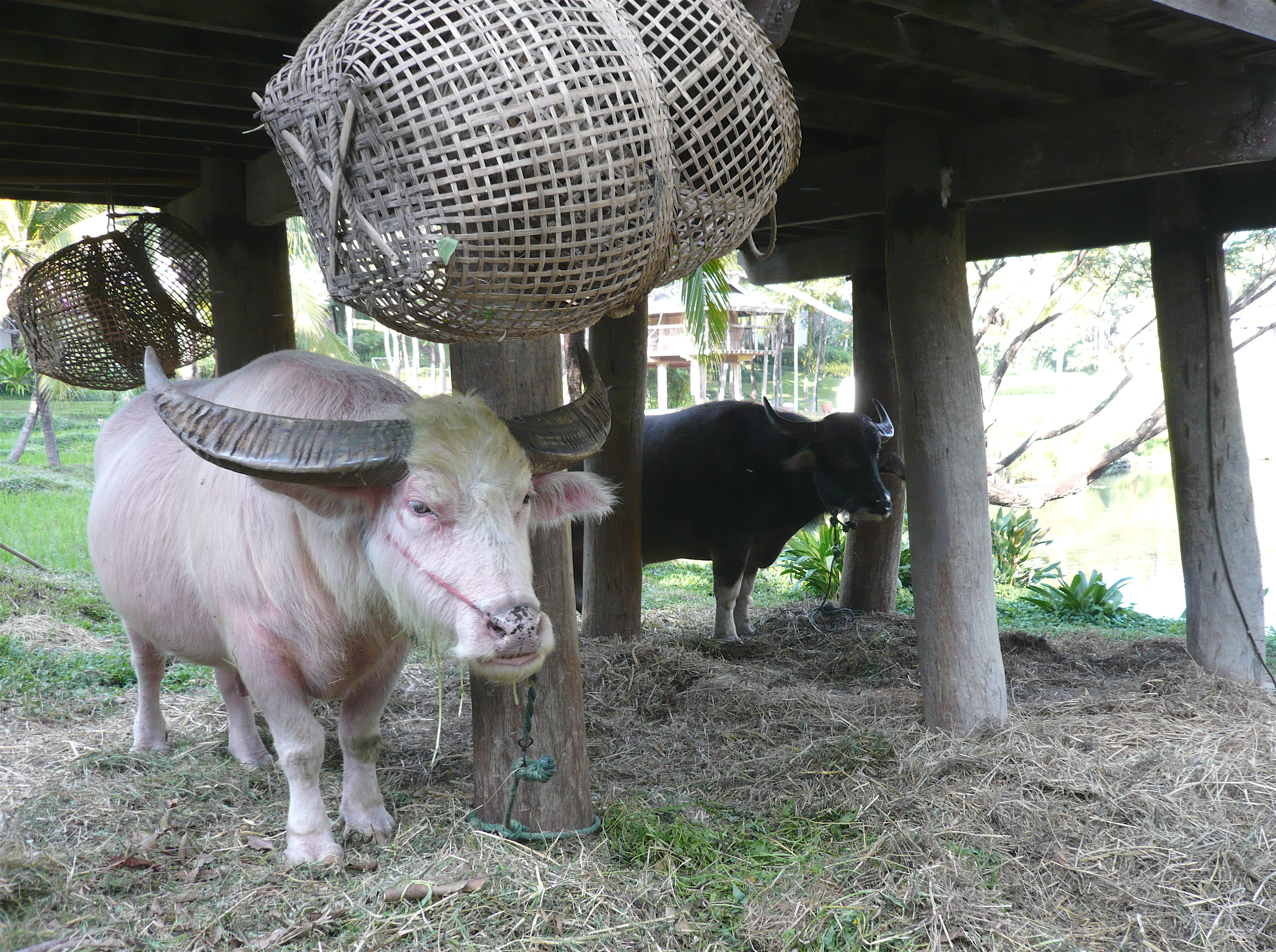
Albino swamp buffalo in Chiang Mai province, Thailand

River buffaloes typically have black skin, although some individuals may have dark slate-coloured skin. Swamp buffaloes have grey skin at birth, which becomes slate blue later. Albinoids are present in some populations. River buffaloes have longer faces, smaller girths, and bigger limbs than swamp buffaloes. Their dorsal ridges extend further back and taper off more gradually. Their horns grow downward and backward, then curve upward in a spiral. Swamp buffaloes are heavy-bodied and stockily built, with a short body and large belly. The forehead is flat, the eyes are prominent, the face is short, and the muzzle is wide. The neck is comparatively long, and the withers and croup are prominent. A dorsal ridge extends backward and ends abruptly just before the end of the chest. Their horns grow outward and curve in a semicircle, but always remain more or less on the plane of the forehead. The tail is short, reaching only to the hocks. The size of the body and shape of the horns may vary greatly among breeds. Height at the withers is 129–133 cm (51–52 in) for bulls and 120–127 cm (47–50 in) for cows, but large individuals may attain 160 cm (63 in). Head–lump length at maturity typically ranges from 240–300 cm (94–118 in) with a 60–100 cm (24–39 in) long tail. They range in weight from 300–550 kg (660–1,210 lb), but weights of over 1,000 kg (2,200 lb) have also been observed.

Tedong bonga is a piebald water buffalo with a unique black and white coloration favoured by the Toraja of Sulawesi.

The swamp buffalo has 48 chromosomes, while the river buffalo has 50 chromosomes. The two types do not readily interbreed, but fertile offspring can occur. Water buffalo–cattle hybrids have not been observed to occur, but the embryos of such hybrids reach maturity in laboratory experiments, albeit at lower rates than non-hybrids.

The rumen of the water buffalo differs from the rumen of other ruminants. It contains a larger population of bacteria, particularly the cellulolytic bacteria, lower protozoa, and higher fungi zoospores. In addition, higher levels of the rumen ammonia nitrogen (NH_{4}-N) and pH have been found compared to those in cattle.

== Ecology and behavior ==
River buffaloes prefer deep water. Swamp buffaloes prefer to wallow in mudholes, which they make with their horns. During wallowing, they acquire a thick coating of mud. Both are well-adapted to a hot and humid climate with temperatures ranging from 0 °C (32 °F) in the winter to 30 °C (86 °F) and greater in the summer. Water availability is important in hot climates, since they need wallows, rivers, or splashing water to assist in thermoregulation. Some water buffalo breeds are adapted to saline seaside shores and saline sandy terrain.

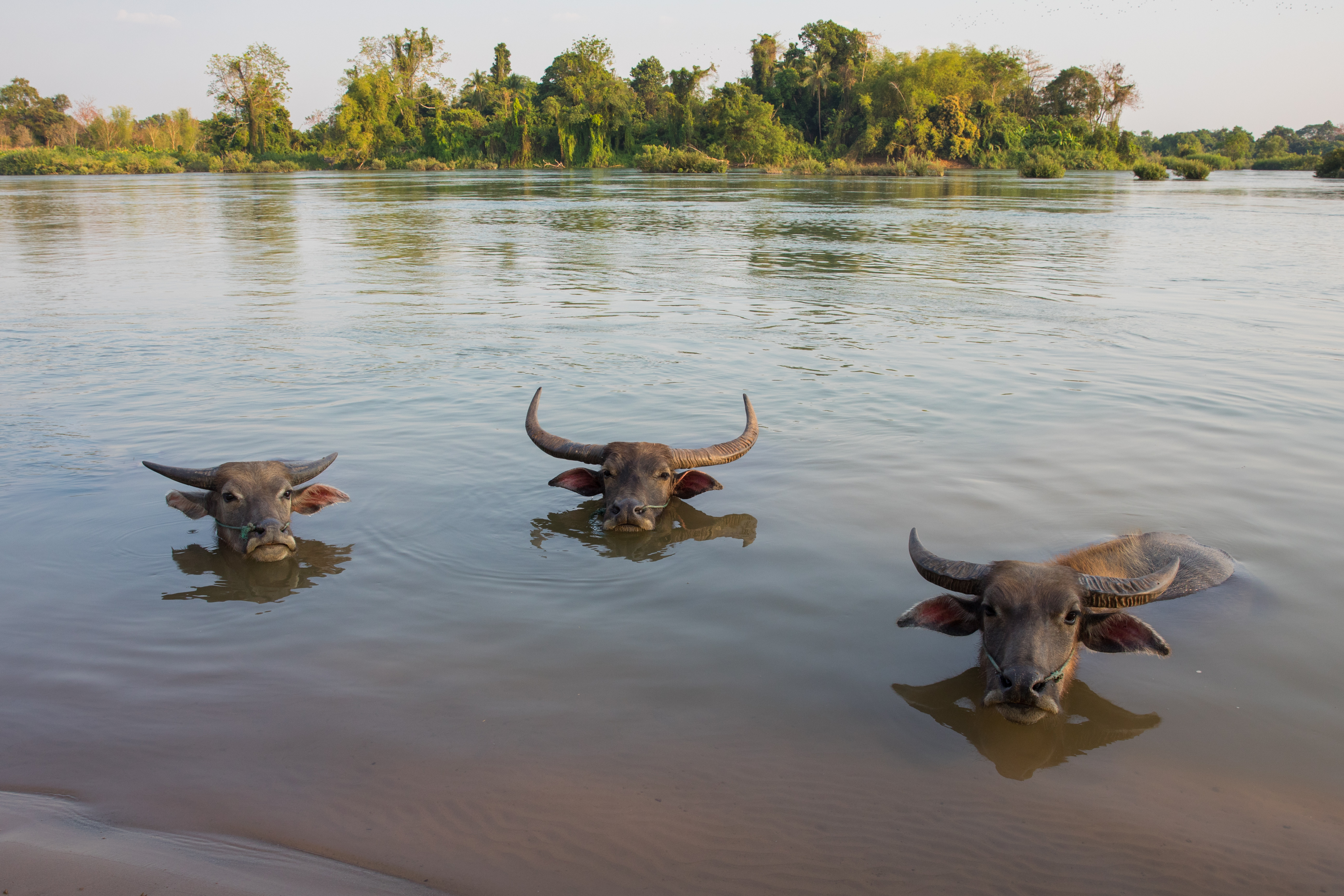
Almost submerged, Laos

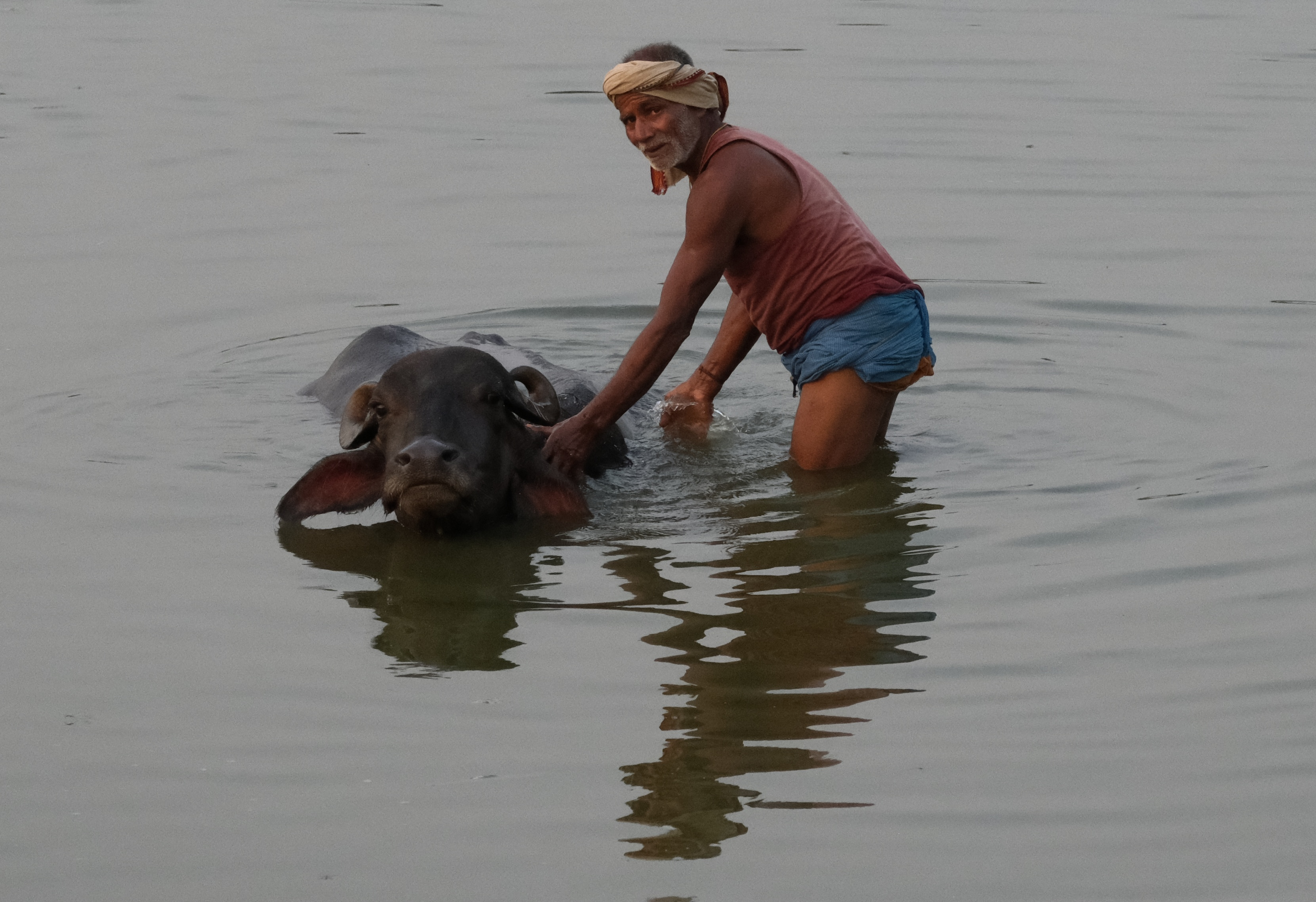
Man bathing water buffalo

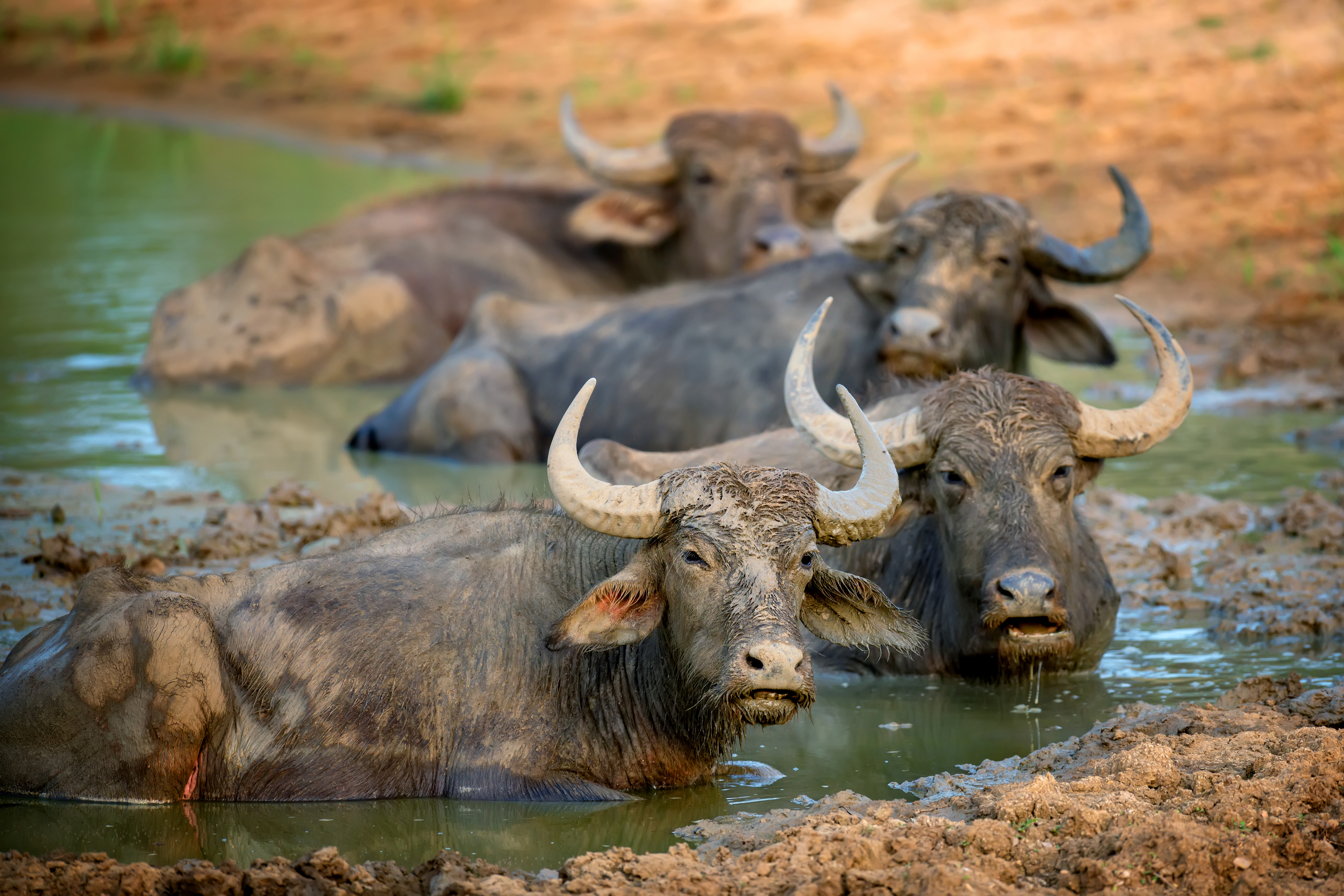
Wallowing in mud, Sri Lanka

=== Diet ===
Green fodders are widely used for intensive buffalo milk production and for fattening. Many fodder crops are conserved as hay, chaffed, or pulped. Fodders include alfalfa, banana plants, cassava, maize, oats, and sorghum. During floods, the animals can graze under water, feeding on aquatic plants such as reeds, sedges, and species of marsh grasses. They can help to keep waterways open by eating water hyacinth.

=== Reproduction ===
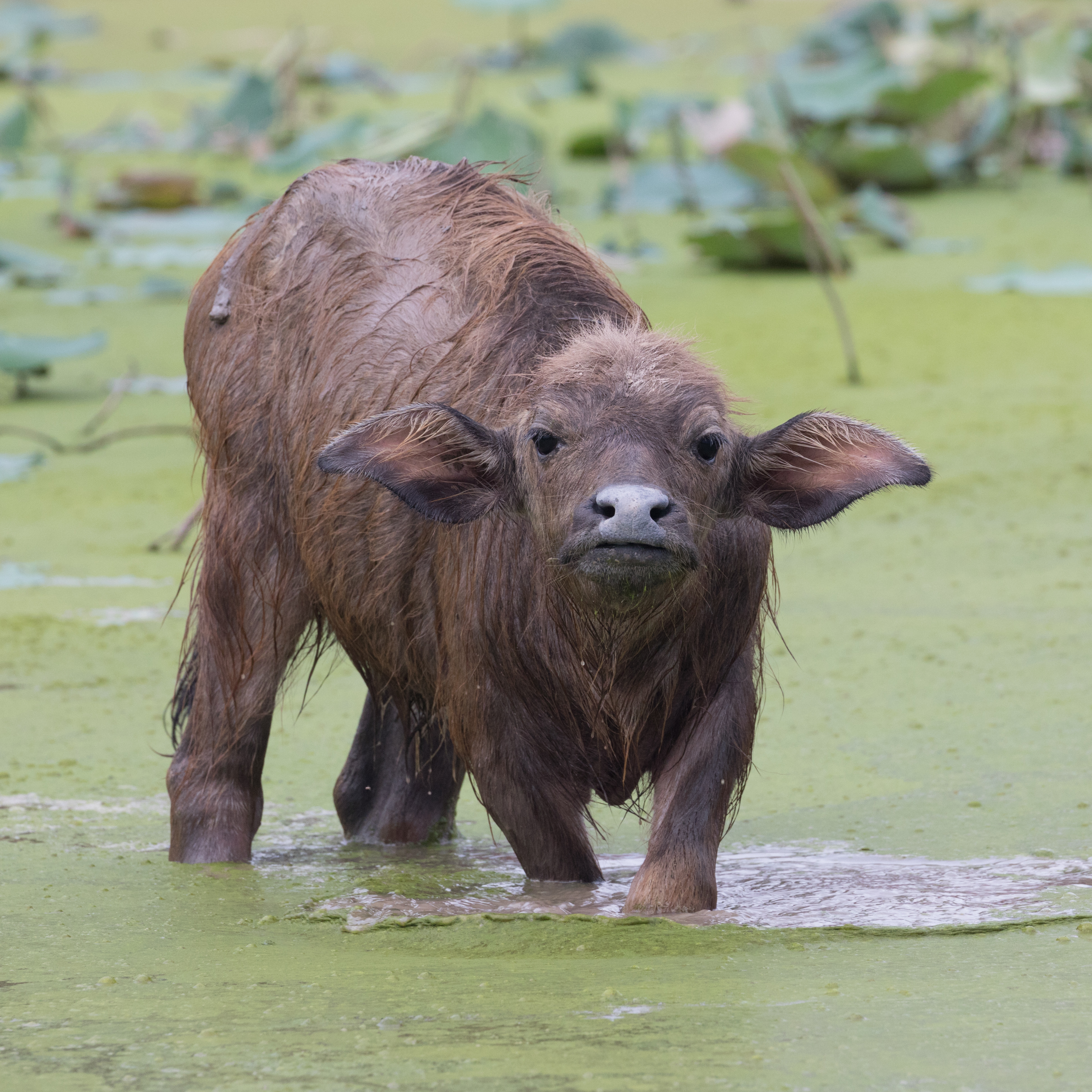
Calf, Laos

Swamp buffaloes generally become reproductive at an older age than river breeds. Young males in Egypt, India, and Pakistan are first mated around 3.0–3.5 years of age, but in Italy, they may be used as early as 2 years of age. Successful mating behaviour may continue until the animal is 12 years or even older. A good river buffalo male can impregnate 100 females in a year. A strong seasonal influence on mating occurs. Heat stress reduces libido.

Although water buffaloes are polyoestrous, their reproductive efficiency shows wide variation throughout the year. The cows exhibit a distinct seasonal change in displaying oestrus, conception rate, and calving rate. The age at the first oestrus of heifers varies between breeds from 13 to 33 months, but mating at the first oestrus is often infertile and usually deferred until they are 3 years old. Gestation lasts from 281 to 334 days, but most reports give a range between 300 and 320 days. Swamp buffaloes carry their calves for one or two weeks longer than river buffaloes. Finding water buffaloes that continue to work well at the age of 30 is not uncommon, and instances of a working life of 40 years have been recorded.

== Domestication and breeding ==
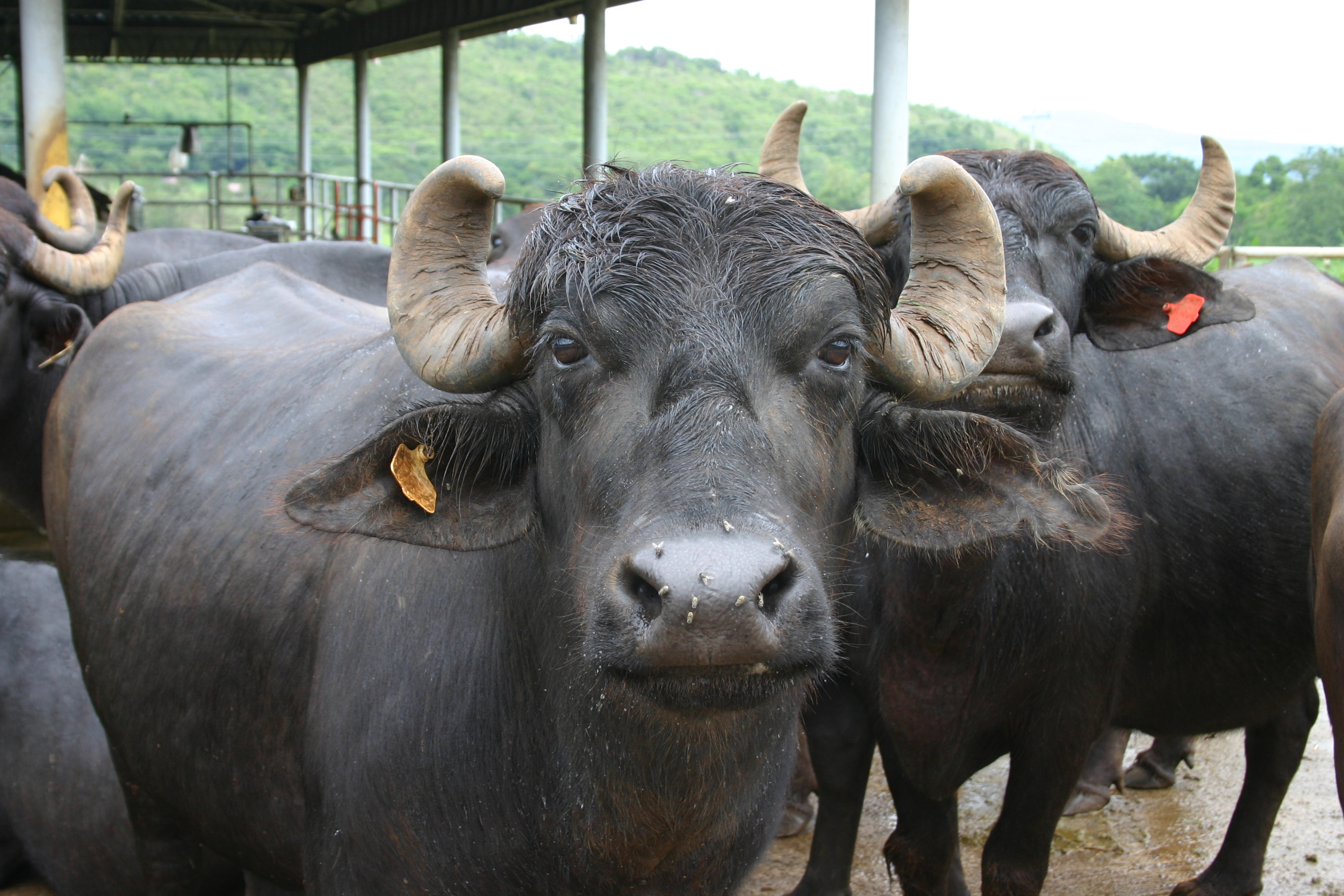
Murrah buffalo herd at the Philippine Carabao Center

The most probable ancestor of domesticated water buffalo is the wild water buffalo (Bubalus arnee), which is native to the Indian subcontinent and tropical Southeast Asia. Two types of domesticated water buffalo are recognized, based on morphological and behavioural criteria – the river buffalo (of the western Indian subcontinent and west to the Levant, the Balkans, and the Mediterranean) and the swamp buffalo (found from Assam and East India in the west, east to the Yangtze Valley of China, and south through Indochina and Southeast Asia).

River- and swamp-type water buffalo are believed to have been domesticated independently. Results of a phylogenetic study indicate that the river-type water buffalo probably originated in western India and was probably domesticated about 6,300 years ago (c. 4300 BCE); the swamp-type originated independently from Mainland Southeast Asia, being domesticated between 3–7,000 years ago. The river buffalo dispersed west as far as Egypt, southern Europe, the Levant, and the Mediterranean regions; swamp buffalo dispersed in the opposite direction, to the rest of Southeast Asia, and as far as the Yangtze Valley in China.

Swamp-type water buffalo entered Island Southeast Asia from at least 2,500 years ago through the northern Philippines, where butchered remains of domesticated water buffalo have been recovered from the Neolithic Nagsabaran site (part of the Lal-lo and Gattaran Shell Middens, c. 2200 BCE to 400 CE). These became the ancestors of the distinctly swamp-type carabao buffalo breed of the Philippines which, in turn, spread to Guam, Indonesia, and Malaysia, among other smaller islands.

The present-day river buffalo is the result of complex domestication processes involving more than one maternal lineage and a significant maternal gene flow from wild populations after the initial domestication events. Twenty-two breeds of the river buffalo are known, including the Murrah, Nili-Ravi, Surti, Carabao, Anatolian, Mediterranean, and Egyptian buffaloes. China has a huge variety of water buffalo genetic resources, with 16 local swamp buffalo breeds in various regions.

=== Genetic studies ===
Mitochondrial DNA analyses indicate that the two types were domesticated independently. Sequencing of cytochrome b (CytB) genes of Bubalus species implies that the water buffalo originated from at least two populations, and that the river-type and the swamp-type have differentiated at the full species level. The genetic distance between the two types is so large that a divergence time of about 1.7 million years has been suggested. The swamp-type was noticed to have the closest relationship with the tamaraw of the northern Philippines.

A 2008 DNA analysis of Neolithic water buffalo remains in northern China (previously used as evidence of a Chinese domestication origin) found that the remains were of the extinct Bubalus mephistopheles and are not genetically related to modern domesticated water buffaloes. Another study in 2004 also concluded that the remains were from wild specimens. Both indicate that water buffaloes were first domesticated outside of China. Analyses of mitochondrial DNA and single-nucleotide polymorphism indicate that swamp and river buffaloes were crossbred in China.

A 2020 analysis of the genomes of 91 swamp and 30 river buffaloes showed that they separated already before domestication about 0.23 million years ago. A 2021 analysis of water buffalo and lowland anoa genomes unexpectedly found the anoa branching somewhere between swamp and river buffaloes. A 2023 Filipino study using the CytB gene instead found the tamaraw branching between the two.

=== Populations ===
By 2011, the global water buffalo population was about 172 million. The estimated global population of water buffalo is 208 million, distributed in 77 countries in five continents.

Brazil has the largest water buffalo herd in the Western Hemisphere, totaling between 1.6 and 3 million. The region with the highest water buffalo concentration in South America encompasses the Brazilian state of Amapá and the Amazon Delta, including Marajó Island.

== Husbandry ==
The husbandry system used with water buffaloes depends on the purpose for which they are bred and maintained. Most are kept by people who work on small farms in family units. Their water buffaloes live in close association with them, and are often their greatest capital asset. In India, the women and girls generally look after the milking buffaloes, while the men and boys are concerned with the working animals. Throughout Asia, they are commonly tended by children who are often seen leading or riding their charges to wallows. Water buffaloes are the ideal animals for work in the deep mud of paddy fields because of their large hooves and flexible foot joints. They are sometimes called "the living tractor of the East". They are an efficient and economical means of cultivation of small fields. In many rice-producing countries, they are used for threshing and for transporting the sheaves during the rice harvest. They provide power for oilseed mills, sugarcane presses, and devices for raising water. They are widely used as pack animals and, in India and Pakistan, also for heavy haulage. In their invasions of Europe, the Ottoman Turks used water buffaloes for hauling heavy battering rams. Their dung is used as a fertilizer, and as a fuel when dried.

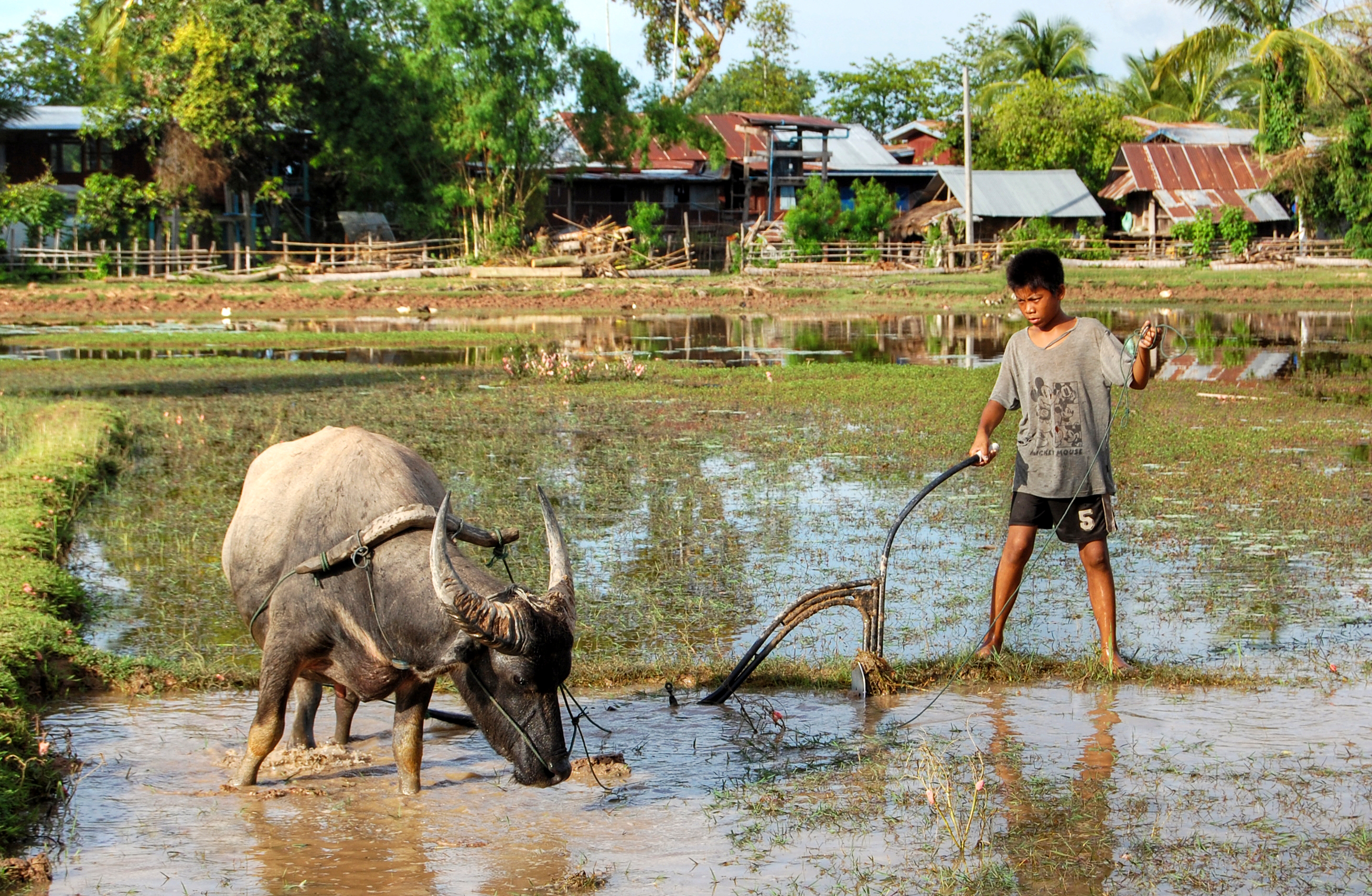
A child plowing with a water buffalo in Si Pan Don, Laos

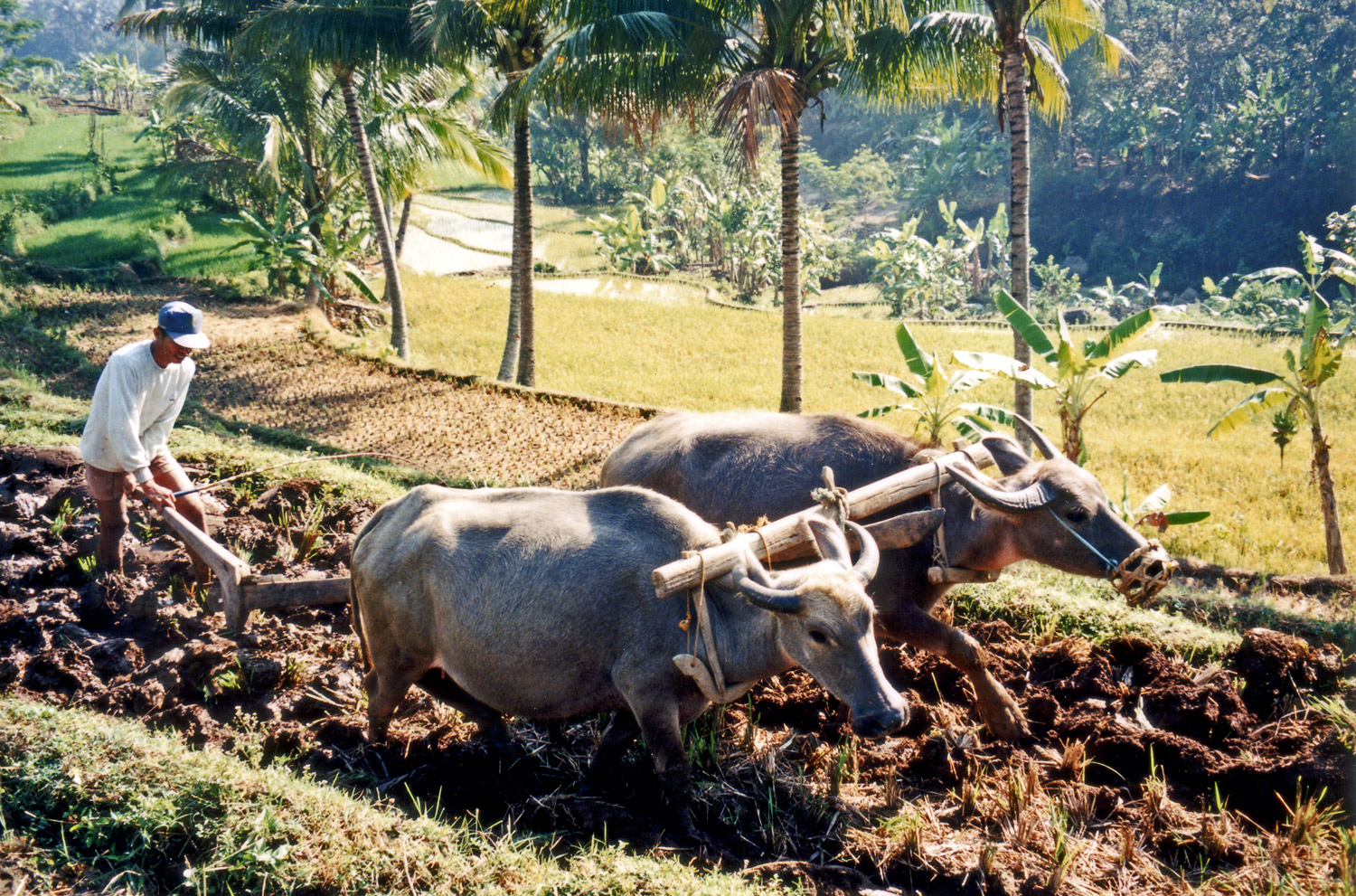
Plowing narrow rice terraces in Java, Indonesia

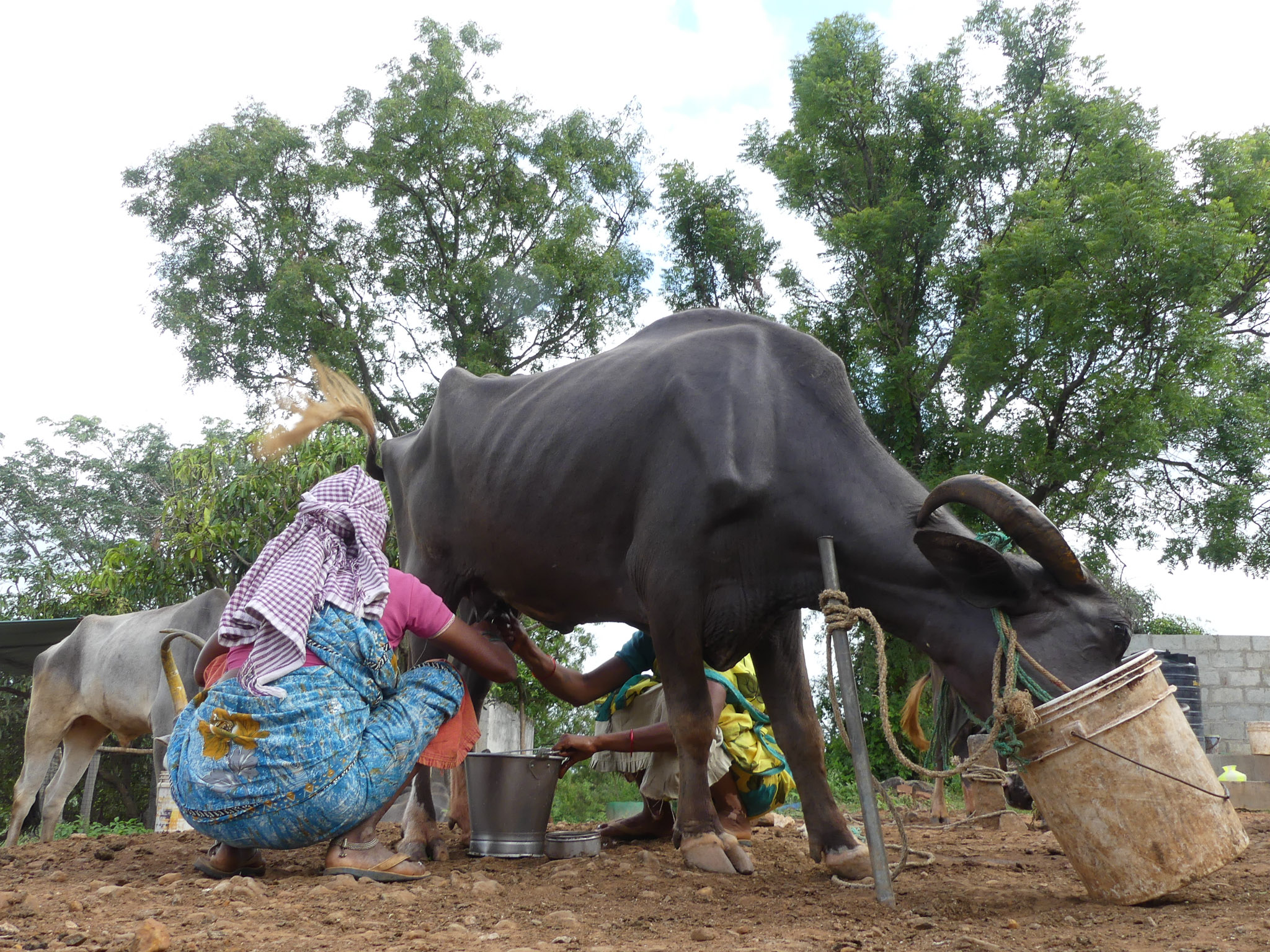
Woman milking a buffalo,
Bangalore, India

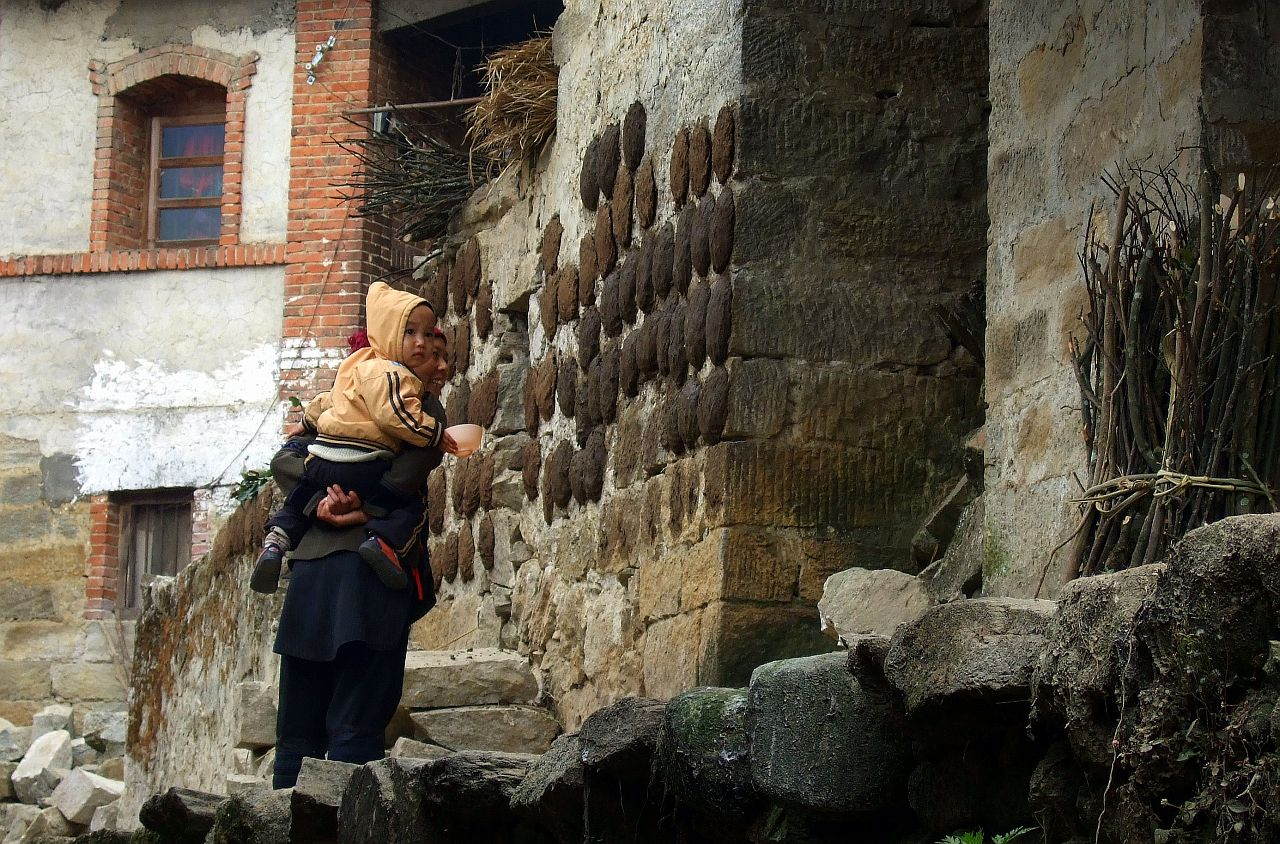
Buffalo dung drying on a house in Yunnan, China

== Products ==
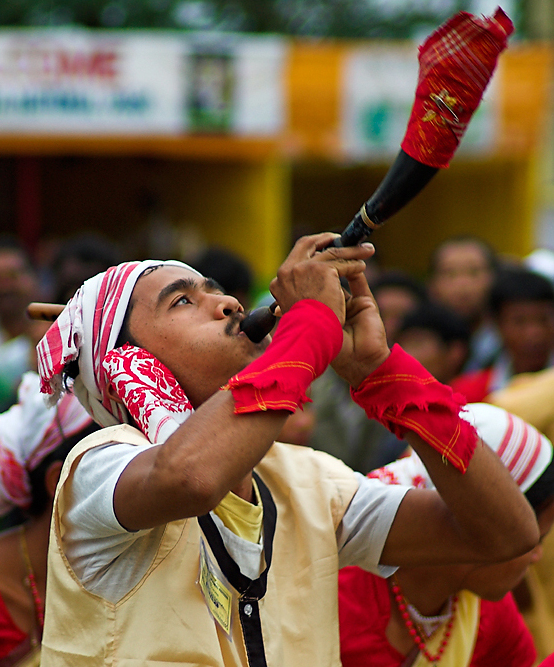
A bihu dancer in Assam blowing a buffalo hornpipe

Around 26 million water buffaloes are slaughtered each year for meat worldwide. They contribute 72 million tonnes of milk and three million tonnes of meat annually to world food, much of it in areas that are prone to nutritional imbalances. In India, river buffaloes are kept mainly for milk production and for transport, whereas swamp buffaloes are kept mainly for work and a small amount of milk.

=== Meat, skin, bone, and horn ===
Water buffalo meat or carabeef is a major source of export revenue for India. The hides provide tough and useful leather.

The bones and horns are often made into jewellery, especially earrings. Horns are used for the embouchure of musical instruments, such as the ney and the kaval.

=== Dairy ===
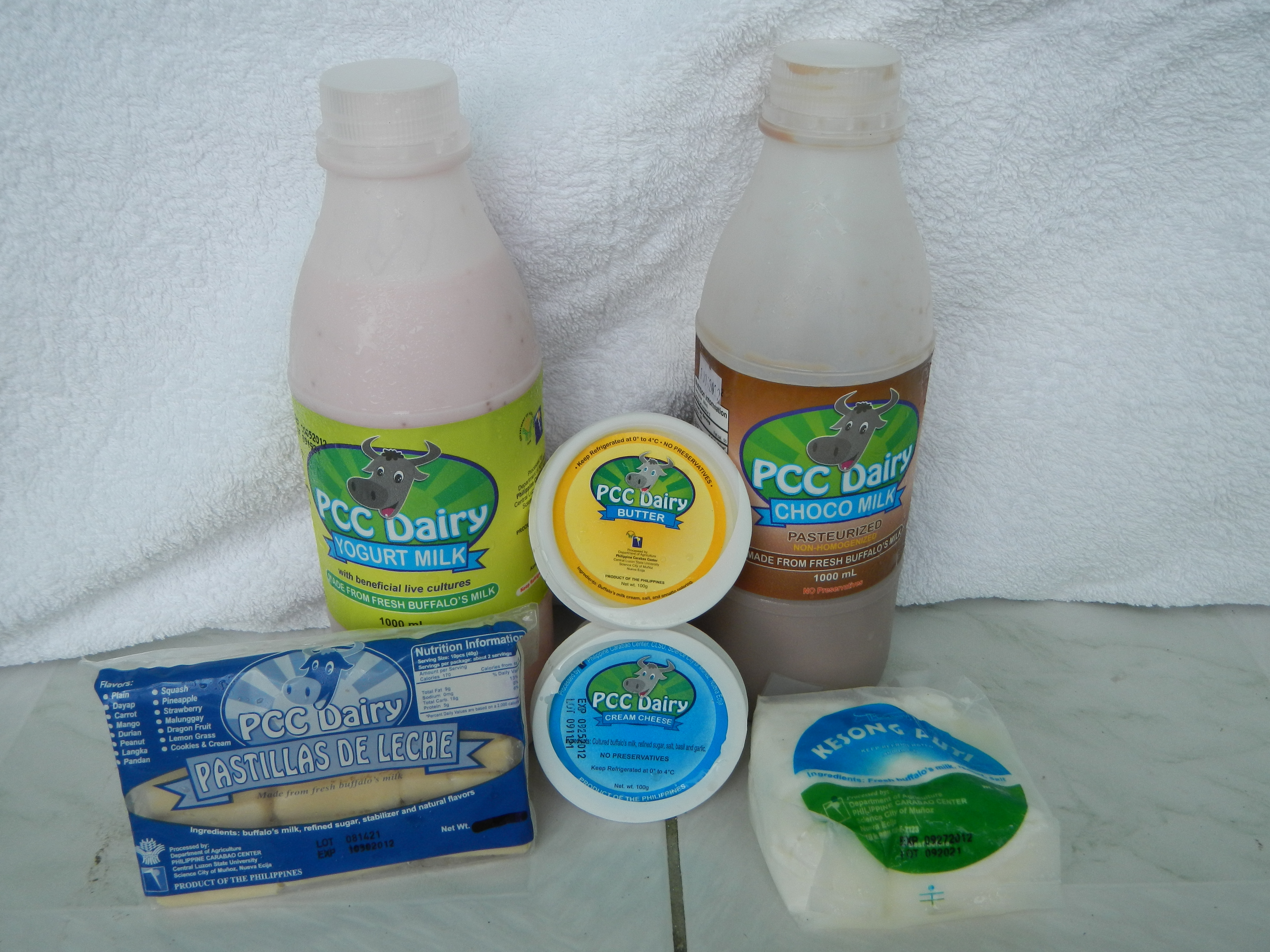
Dairy products of water buffalo milk

Water buffalo milk presents physicochemical features different from those of other ruminant species, such as a higher content of fatty acids and proteins. The physical and chemical parameters of swamp-type and river-type water buffalo milk differ. Water buffalo milk contains higher levels of total solids, crude protein, fat, calcium, and phosphorus, and slightly higher content of lactose compared with those of cow milk. The high level of total solids makes water buffalo milk ideal for processing into value-added dairy products such as cheese. The conjugated linoleic acid content in water buffalo milk ranged from 4.4 mg/g fat in September to 7.6 mg/g fat in June. Seasons and genetics may play a role in variation of CLA level and changes in gross composition of water buffalo milk.

Water buffalo milk is processed into a large variety of dairy products, including:

- Cream churns much faster at higher fat levels and gives higher overrun than cow cream.
- Butter from water buffalo cream displays more stability than that from cow cream.
- Ghee from water buffalo milk has a different texture with a bigger grain size than ghee from cow milk.
- Heat-concentrated milk products in the Indian subcontinent include paneer, khoa, rabri, kheer and basundi.
- Fermented milk products include dadiah in Indonesia.
- Whey is used for making ricotta and mascarpone in Italy, and alkarish in Syria and Egypt.
- Hard cheeses include braila in Romania, and rahss in Egypt.
- Soft cheeses include mozzarella in Italy, karish, mish and madhfor in Iraq, alghab in Syria, kesong puti in the Philippines, and vladeasa in Romania.

Top 10 water buffalo milk producers—2020
Country	Production (tonnes)	Note
India	90,026,273	(Note: unofficial, semi-official, mirror data)
Pakistan	37,256,000	(Note: official figure)
China	2,919,966	(Note: FAO estimate)
Egypt	1,747,641	
Nepal	1,380,600	
Italy	253,830	
Myanmar	205,102	
Iran	128,000	
Mongolia	104,645	
Indonesia	89,983	
Bangladesh	35,790	
World	134,425,197	

== Environmental effects ==
Wildlife conservation scientists have started to recommend and use introduced populations of feral water buffaloes to manage uncontrolled vegetation growth in and around natural wetlands. Introduced water buffaloes at home in such environs provide cheap service by regularly grazing the uncontrolled vegetation and opening up clogged water bodies for waterfowl, wetland birds, and other wildlife.

A large feral population became established in northern Australia in the late 19th century, and there are smaller feral herds in several other countries.

Grazing water buffaloes are sometimes used in Great Britain for conservation grazing, such as in the Chippenham Fen National Nature Reserve. The water buffaloes can better adapt to wet conditions and poor-quality vegetation than cattle. In uncontrolled circumstances, though, water buffaloes can cause environmental damage, such as trampling vegetation, disturbing bird and reptile nesting sites, and spreading exotic weeds.

== Reproductive research ==
=== In vitro fertilization ===
In 2004, Philippine Carabao Center in Nueva Ecija produced the first swamp-type water buffalo born from an in vitro-produced, vitrified embryo. It was named "Glory" after President Gloria Macapagal Arroyo. Joseph Estrada's most successful project as an opposition senator, the PCC was created through Republic Act 3707, the Carabao Act of 1992.

There have been many attempts at creating hybrids between domestic cattle and domestic water buffaloes. To date, none have been successful; the embryos usually only get to the 8-cell stage before failing.

=== Cloning ===
The first cloned swamp-type water buffaloes were born in 2007 using micromanipulation-based somatic cell nuclear transfer; three calves were born, and two died. In 2009, National Dairy Research Institute cloned a river-type water buffalo using a simplified somatic cell nuclear transfer procedure called "handmade cloning". The Central Institute for Research on Buffaloes cloned a water buffalo in 2016.

== In culture ==
The Minangkabau people of West Sumatra adorn their houses and clothing with motifs based on the buffalo's horns as a tribute to the legend that pitted a buffalo (kabau) chosen by their kingdom against one by (traditionally) the Majapahit empire, to which their kingdom won. In Chinese tradition, the water buffalo is associated with a contemplative life. In the Thai and Sinhalese animal and planetary zodiac, the water buffalo is the third animal zodiac of the Thai and the fourth animal zodiac of the Sinhalese people of Sri Lanka. A water buffalo head was a symbol of death in Tibet. The carabao is considered a national symbol of the Philippines, although this has no basis in Philippine law. In Indian mythology, the Hindu god of death, Yama, rides on a water buffalo. A male water buffalo is sacrificed in India during Shaktism festivals.

In the early 19th century in Australia, water buffalo escaped British colonies on the Cobourg Peninsula and became feral. Later Aboriginal Australians of Arnhem Land discovered these herds and perceived these never-before-known animals – nganaparru – as a new manifestation of their dreaming or djang; Indigenous Australian art depicting these water buffalo were resurfaced in a cave within a site named Djarrng near Gunbalanya in 1979.

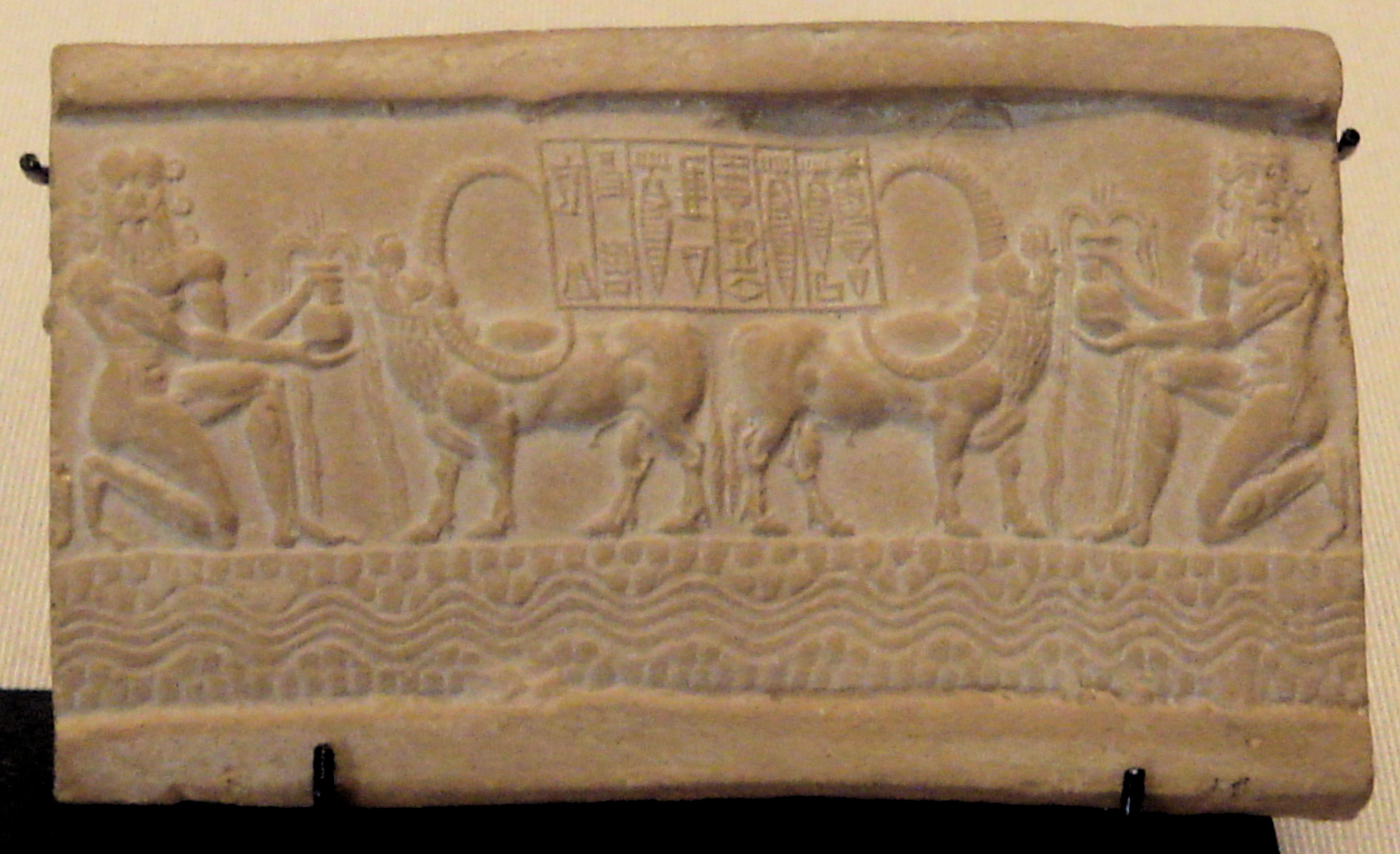
Impression of an Akkadian seal. The long-horned water buffalo testifies to exchanges with the Indus Valley Civilisation. c. 2217–2193 BC.

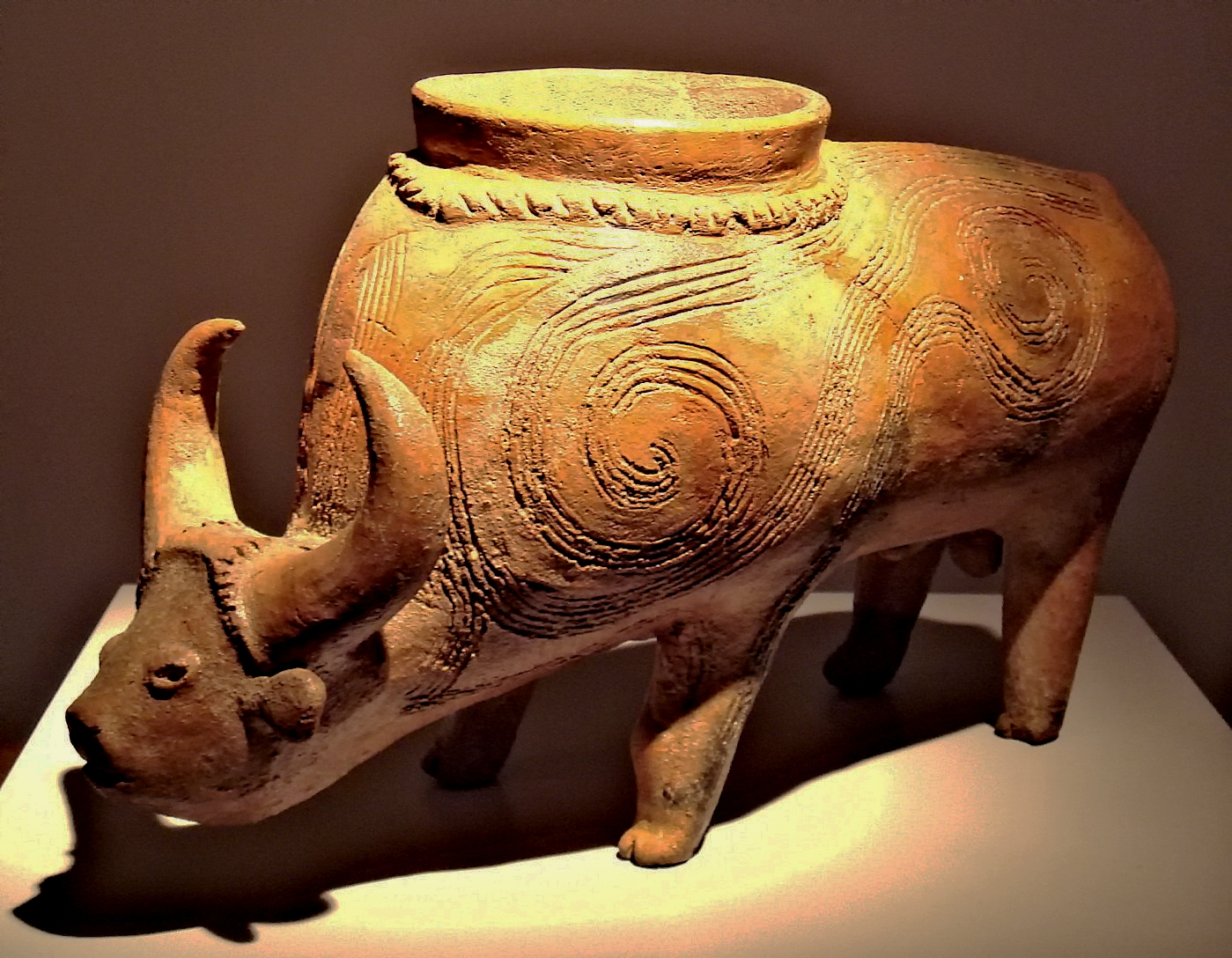
Ceramic from 2300 BC found in Lopburi, Thailand

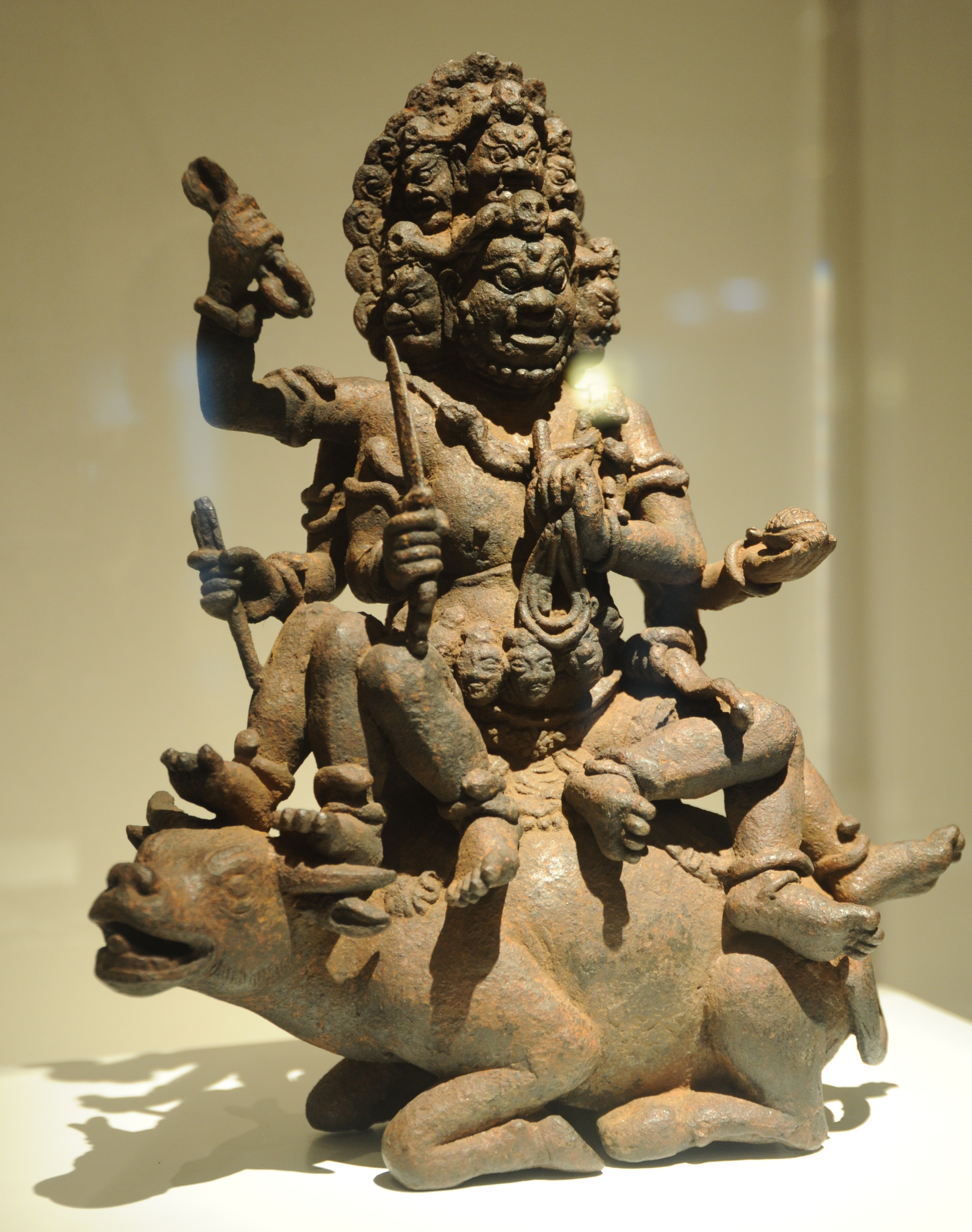
The Hindu and Buddhist deity Yama on a water buffalo

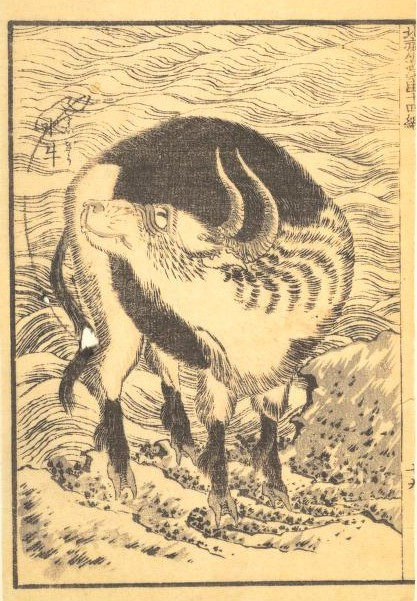
Water Buffalo by Katsushika Hokusai, c. 1875, Japan

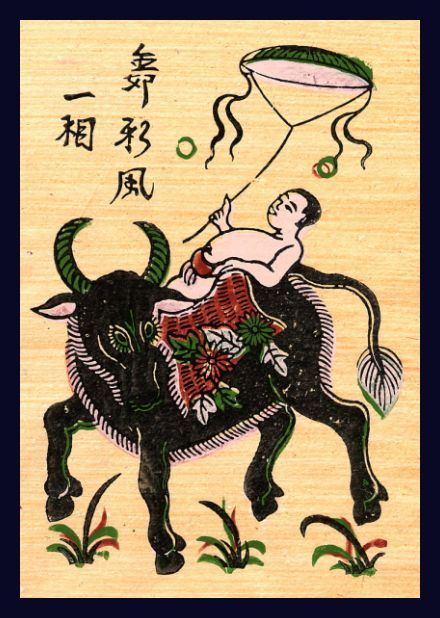
Đông Hồ folk woodcut painting, 19th century, Vietnam

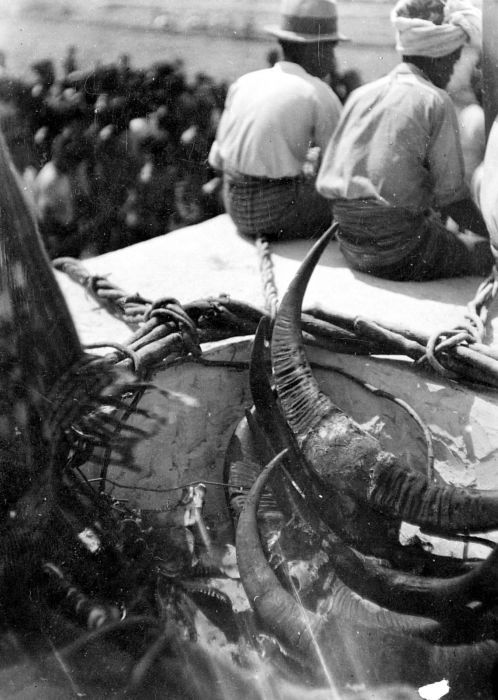
Horns of water buffaloes sacrificed in West Sumba Regency, c. 1936

=== Fighting festivals ===
The Moh juj Water Buffalo Fighting Festival is held every year in Bhogali Bihu in Assam. The Do Son Water Buffalo Fighting Festival of Vietnam is held each year on the ninth day of the eighth month of the lunar calendar at Do Son Township, Haiphong City, Vietnam. It is one of the most popular Vietnam festivals and events in Haiphong City. The preparations for this buffalo fighting festival begin from the two to three months earlier. The competing water buffalo are selected and trained months in advance. The festival is linked with worship of the Water God and the Hien Sinh custom to show the martial spirit of the people of Do Son, Haiphong.

The Ko Samui Water Buffalo Fighting Festival of Thailand is a popular event held on special occasions such as New Year's Day in January, and Songkran in mid-April. This festival features head-wrestling bouts in which two male water buffaloes are pitted against one another. Unlike in Spanish-style bullfighting, wherein bulls get killed while fighting sword-wielding men, the festival held at Ko Samui is a fairly harmless contest. The fighting season varies according to ancient customs and ceremonies. The first water buffalo to turn and run away is considered the loser; the winning water buffalo becomes worth several million baht.

=== Racing festivals ===
The Kambala races of Karnataka, India, take place between October and March. Buffalo racing in Kerala is similar to the Kambala races.

=== Religious festival ===
- In the Philippines, the Pulilan Carabao Festival is held annually every 14 and 15 May in the town of Pulilan in honor of Isidore the Laborer, the patron saint of farmers. As thanksgiving for a bountiful harvest every year, farmers parade their carabaos in the main town street, adorning them with garlands and other decorations. One of the highlights of the festival is the kneeling of the carabaos in front of the parish church.
Fights, races, and festivals

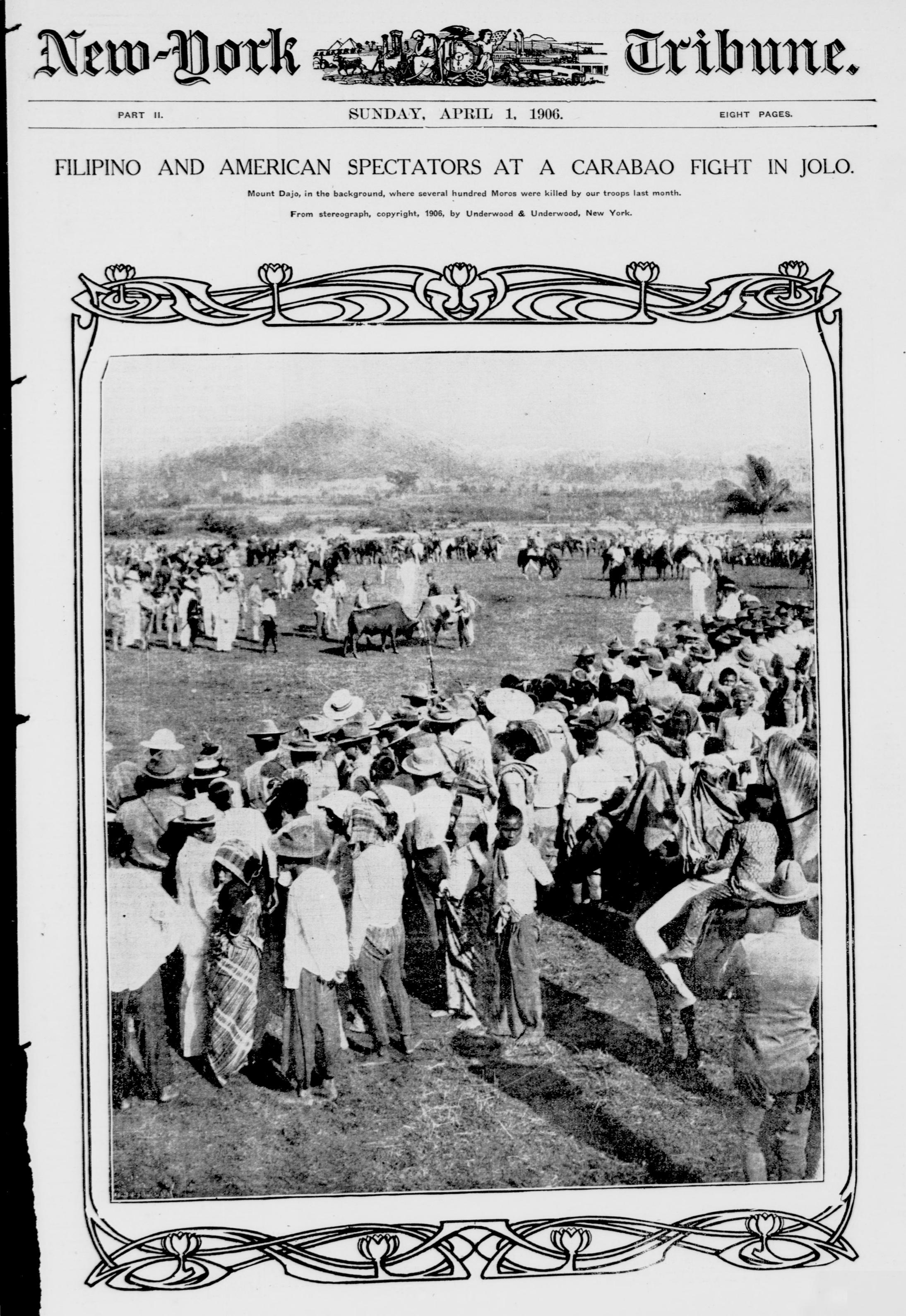
Filipinos and American soldiers observing a fight in 1906

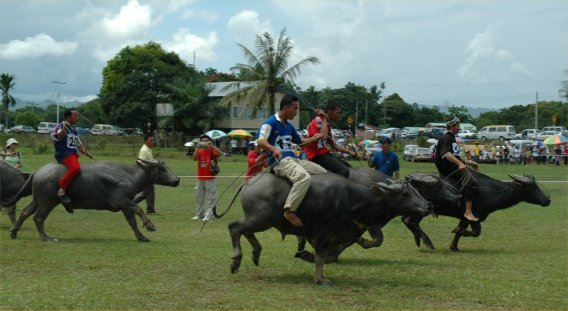
Racing at Babulang 2006

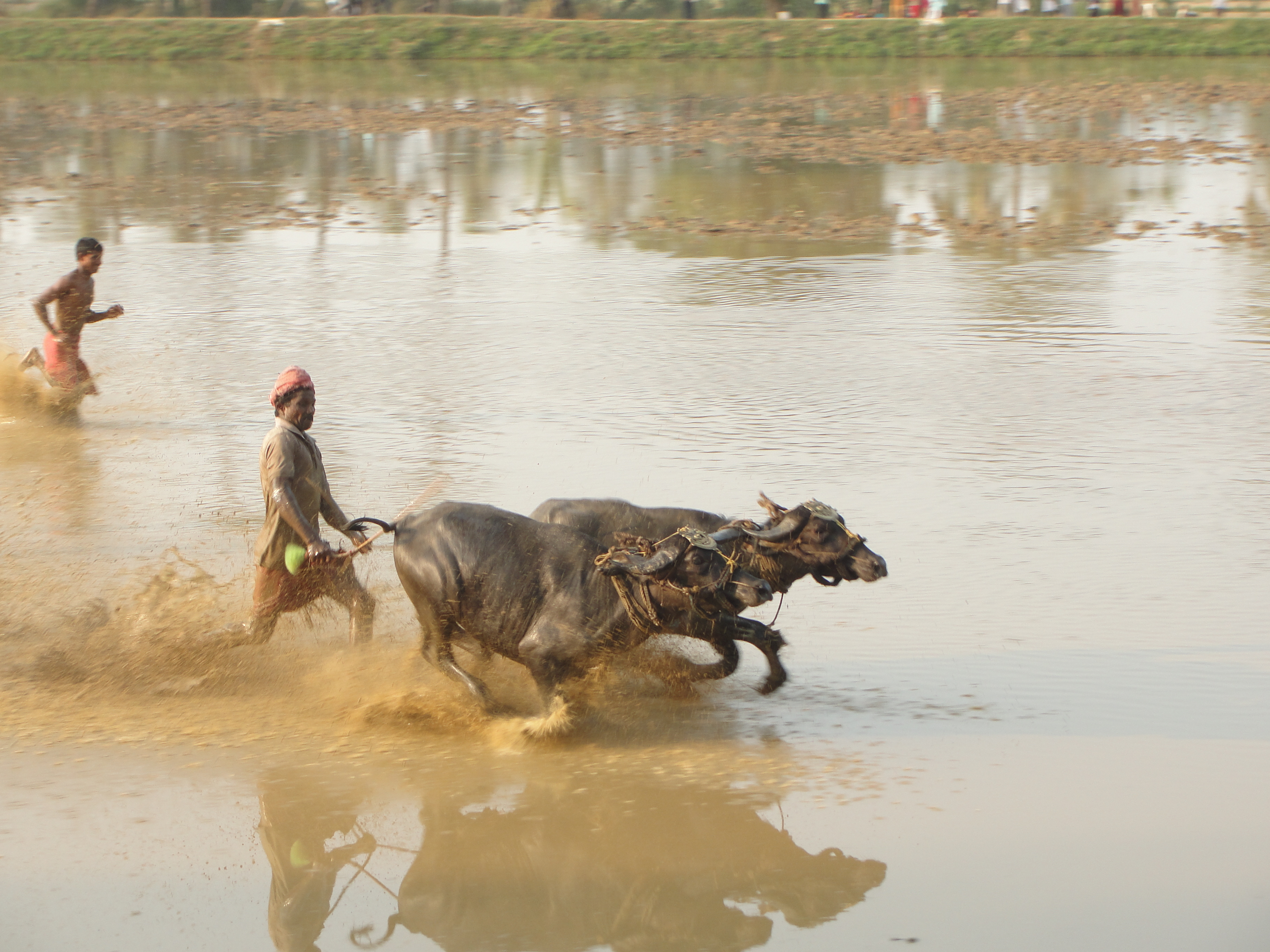
Race at Vandar village, Udupi district, India

== See also ==
- African buffalo (Syncerus caffer)
- Bubalus murrensis
- Cattle in religion
- Italian Mediterranean buffalo
- List of water buffalo breeds
- Zebu – the common breed of domestic cattle from India
