= Domiati =

Soft white salty cheese made primarily in Egypt

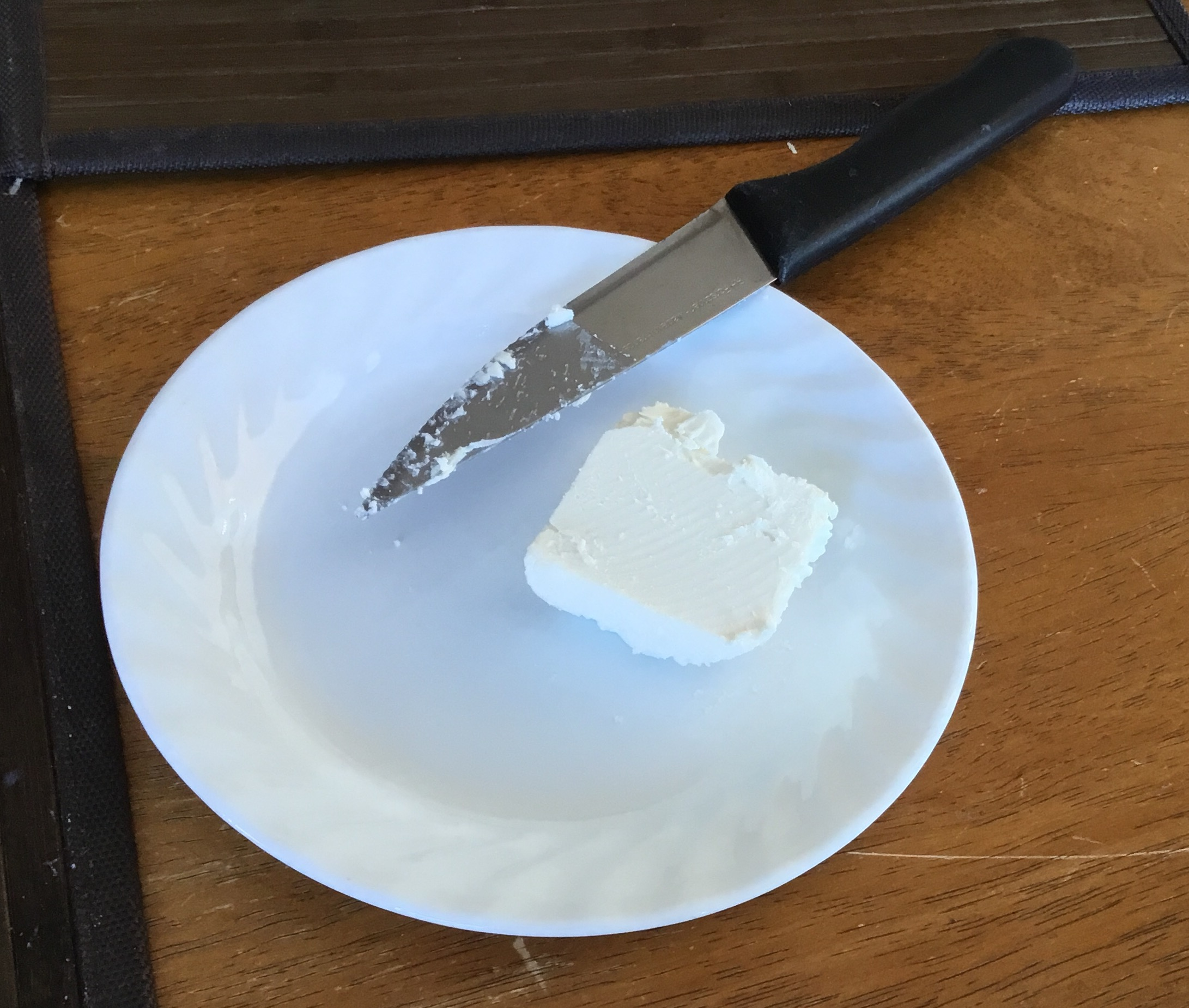
- Country of origin: Egypt
- Pasteurised: No
- Texture: Soft

Domiati cheese, (Note: (Egyptian Arabic: جبنه دمياطى)) also referred to as "white cheese", (Note: (Egyptian Arabic: جبنه بيضا, romanized: gebna bēḍa, IPA: [ˈɡebnæ ˈbeːdˤɑ])) is a soft white salty cheese made primarily in Egypt, but also in Sudan and other Middle Eastern countries. Typically made from buffalo milk, cow milk, or a mixture, it can also be made from other milks, such as sheep, goat or camel milk. It is the most common Egyptian cheese. Unlike feta and other white cheeses, salt is added directly to the milk, before rennet is added. It is named after the seaport city of Damietta (دمياط).

== Production ==
Domiati production involves pasteurizing milk briefly, then salting a portion of it before adding rennet. This method results in a high-moisture, salty cheese, distinct from feta due to its pre-rennet salting. Domiati can be eaten fresh, or it may be aged in brine for a few months, enhancing its pickled flavor; the cheese gets more acidic as it ages.

Usually, no starter culture is added; instead, the bacteria already present in the milk cause the fermentation. The salting and ripening processes give the cheese a feta-like texture and taste; it is brittle rather than elastic when broken.

== See also ==
- List of cheeses
