= Water buffalo populations =

World distribution of the animals

Water buffalo populations are distributed around the world because of their economic usefulness for work, dairy products, and meat. The global population in 2020 was 208 million, across 77 countries and all five continents.

By 2011, the global water buffalo population was about 172 million. The estimated global population of water buffalo is 208,098,759 head distributed in 77 countries in five continents.

== In Asia ==
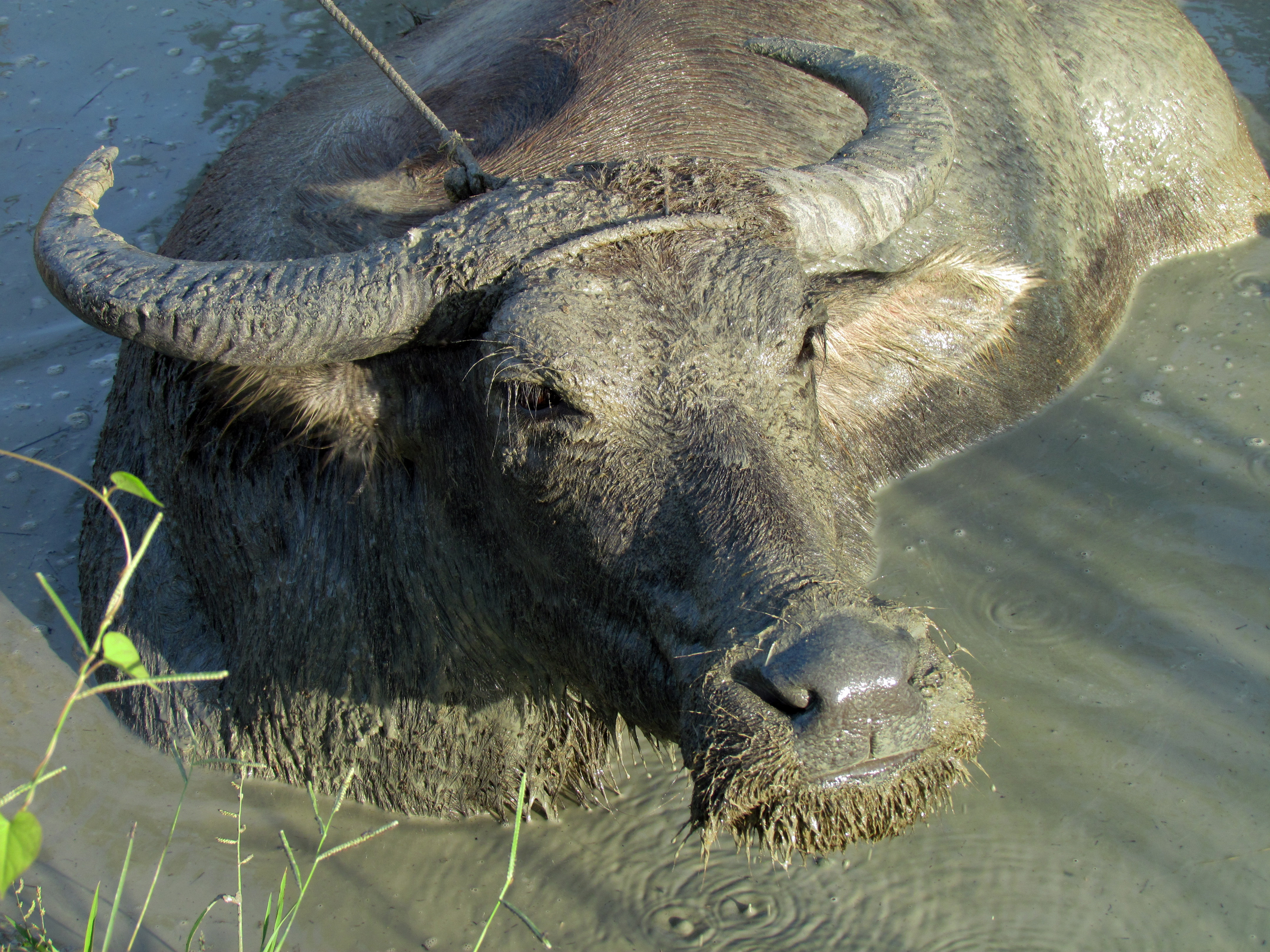
A water buffalo in the Philippines

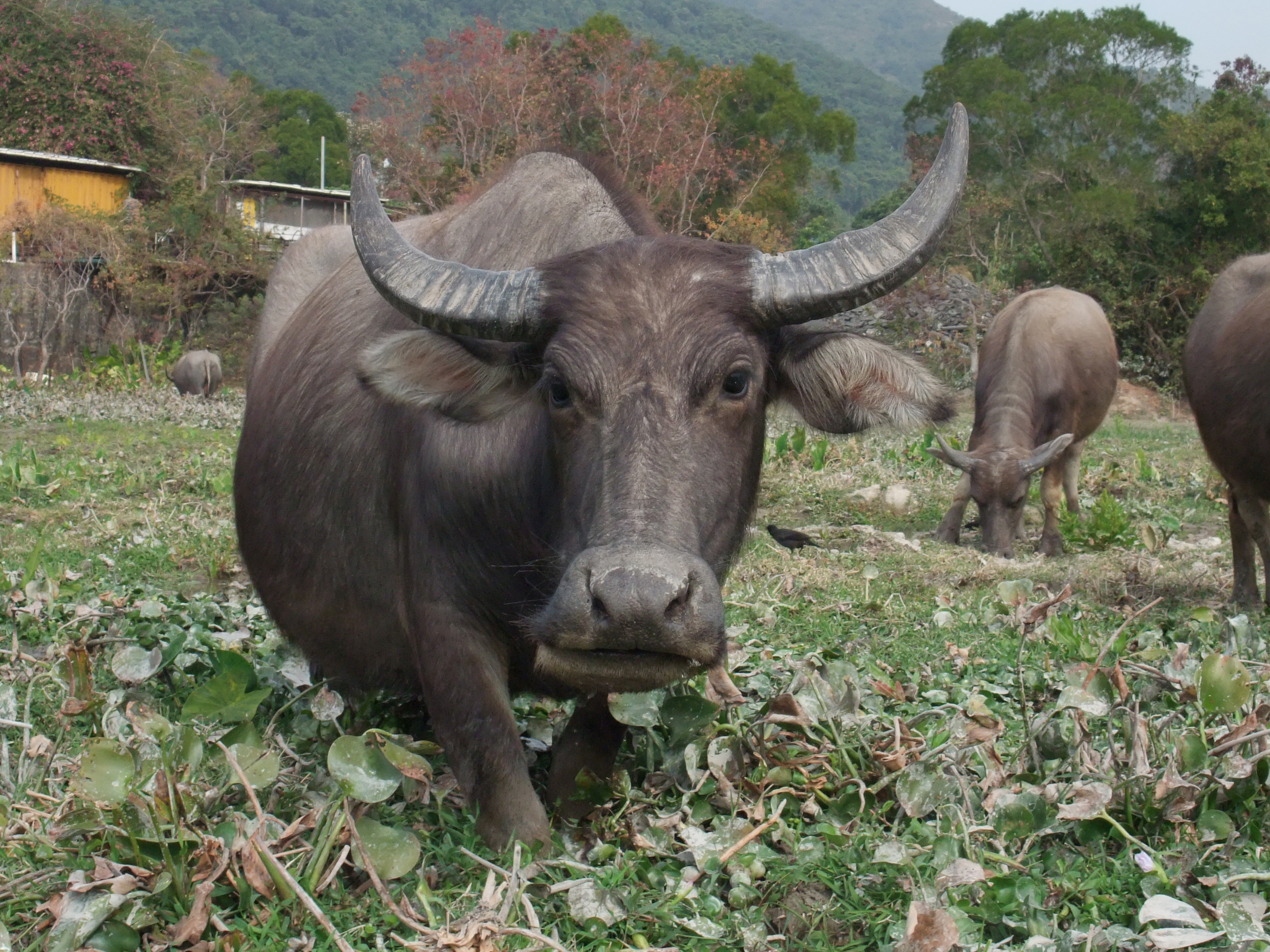
There is an ongoing monitoring project to evaluate ecological roles of feral water buffaloes as ecosystem engineers on Lantau Island, Hong Kong

More than 95.8% of the world population of water buffaloes are kept in Asia, including both the river-type and the swamp-type. The water buffalo population in India numbered over 97.9 million head in 2003, representing 56.5% of the world population. They are primarily of the river type, with 10 well-defined breeds: the Bhadawari, Banni, Jafarabadi, Marathwadi, Mehsana, Murrah, Nagpuri, Nili-Ravi, Pandharpuri, Surti, and Toda buffaloes. Swamp buffaloes occur only in small areas in northeastern India and are not distinguished into breeds.

In 2003, the second-largest population lived in China, with 22.76 million head, all of the swamp-type, with many breeds kept only in the lowlands, and other breeds kept only in the mountains; as of 2003, 3.2 million swamp-type carabao buffaloes were in the Philippines, nearly 3 million swamp buffaloes were in Vietnam, and roughly 773,000 buffaloes were in Bangladesh. About 750,000 head were estimated in Sri Lanka in 1997. In Japan, the water buffalo was used as a domestic animal throughout the Ryukyu Islands or Okinawa prefecture, however it is almost extinct now and mainly used as a tourist attraction. Per a 2015 report, about 836,500 water buffaloes were in Nepal.

The water buffalo is the main dairy animal in Pakistan, with 23.47 million head in 2010. Of these, 76% are kept in the Punjab. The rest are mostly kept in the province of Sindh. The water buffalo breeds used are the Nili-Ravi, Kundi, and Azi Kheli. Karachi alone has upwards of 400,000 head of water buffalo in 2021, which provide dairy as well as meat to the local population.

In Thailand, the number of water buffaloes dropped from more than 3 million head in 1996 to less than 1.24 million head in 2011. Slightly over 75% of them are kept in the country's northeastern region. By the beginning of 2012, less than one million were in the country, partly as a result of illegal shipments to neighbouring countries where sales prices are higher than in Thailand.

The population of water buffaloes in Bangladesh grew significantly, rising from slightly above 1 million in 2002 to over 1.8 million by 2017.

Water buffaloes are also present in the southern region of Iraq in the Mesopotamian Marshes. The draining of the Mesopotamian Marshes by Saddam Hussein was an attempt to punish the south for the 1991 Iraqi uprisings. After 2003 and the Firdos Square statue destruction, these lands were reflooded and a 2007 report on Maysan and Dhi Qar shows a steady increase in the number of water buffaloes. The report puts the number at 40,008 head in those two provinces.

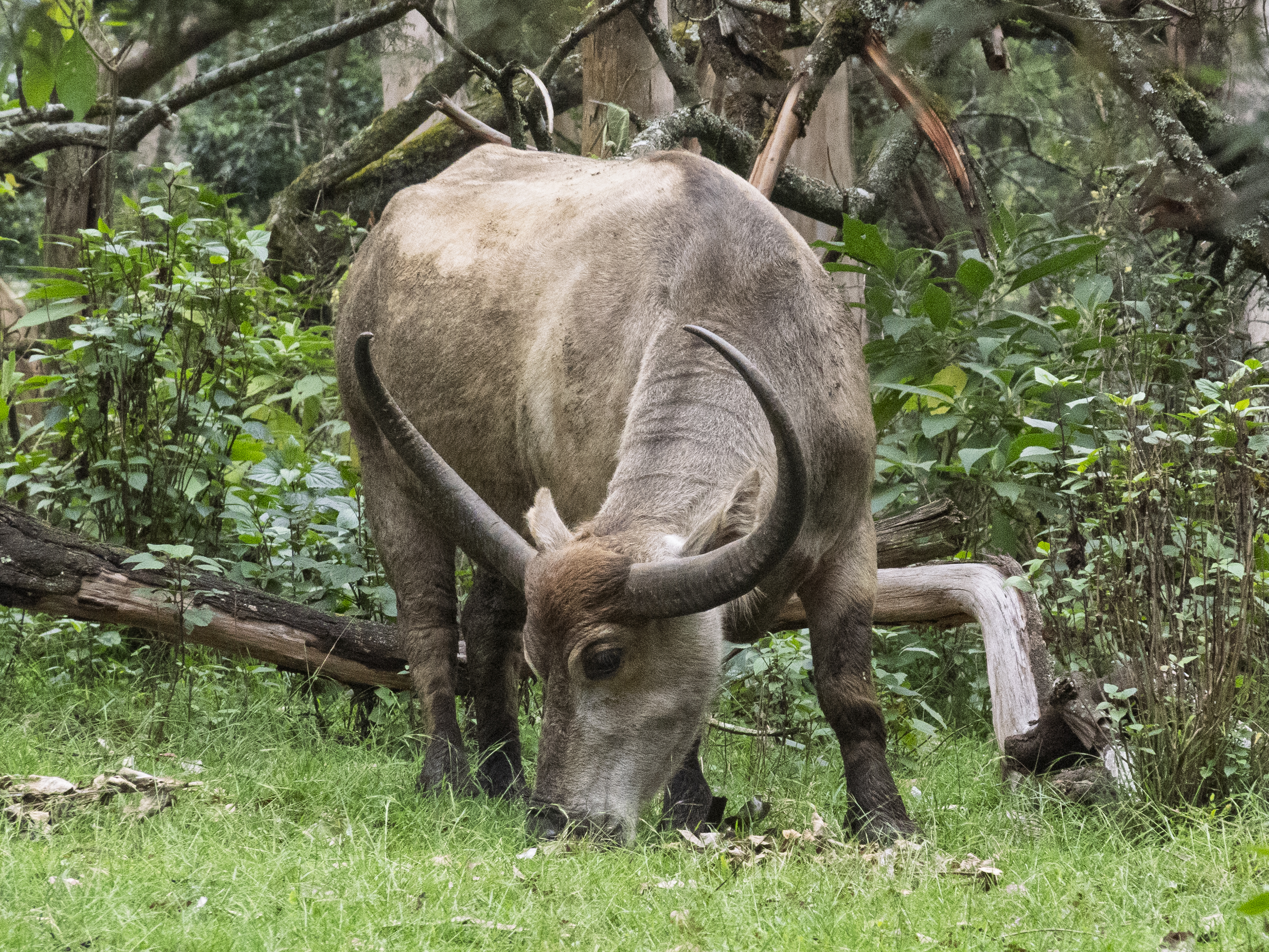
Toda buffalo, Nilgiris, India

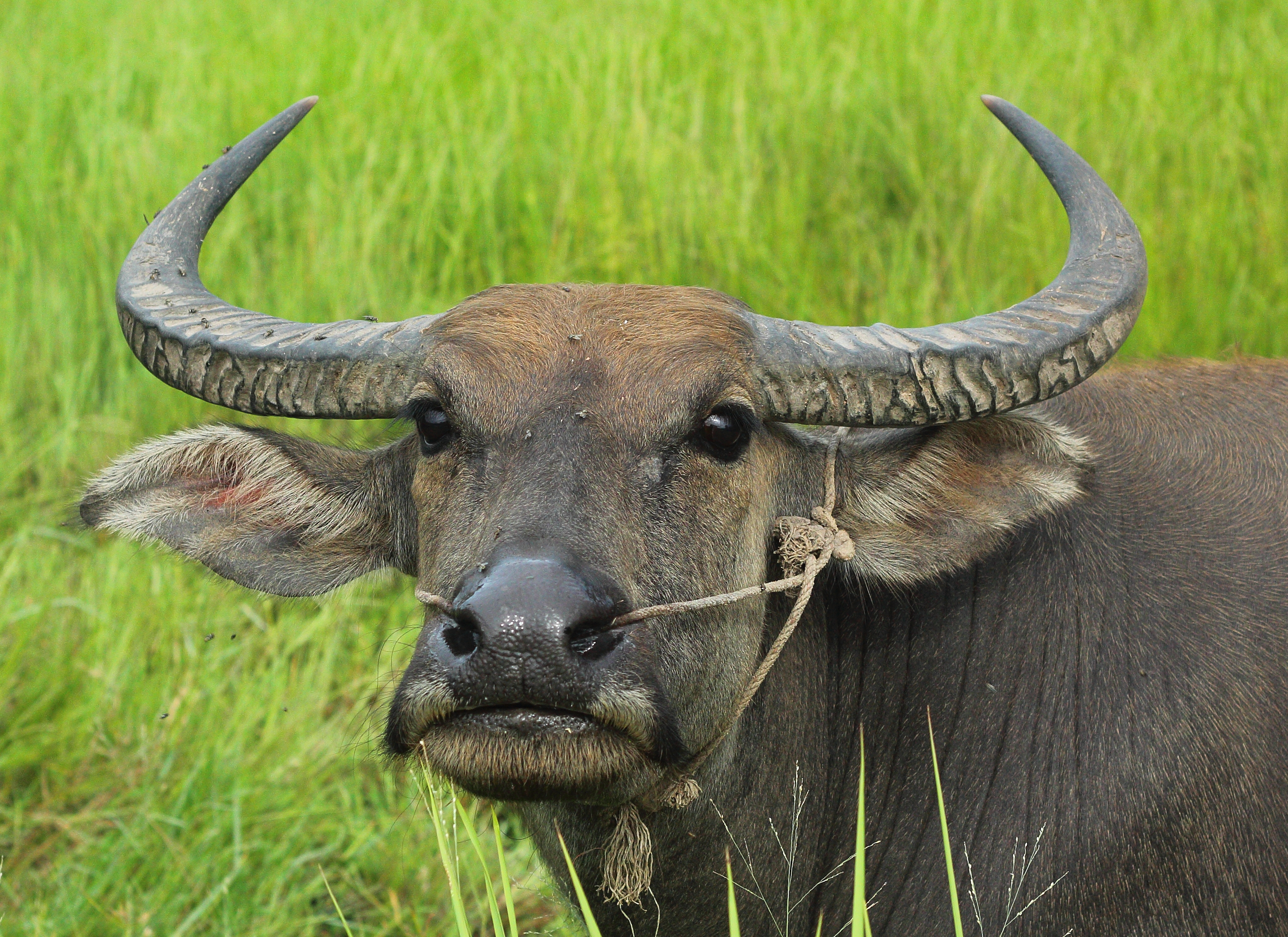
A water buffalo in Cambodia

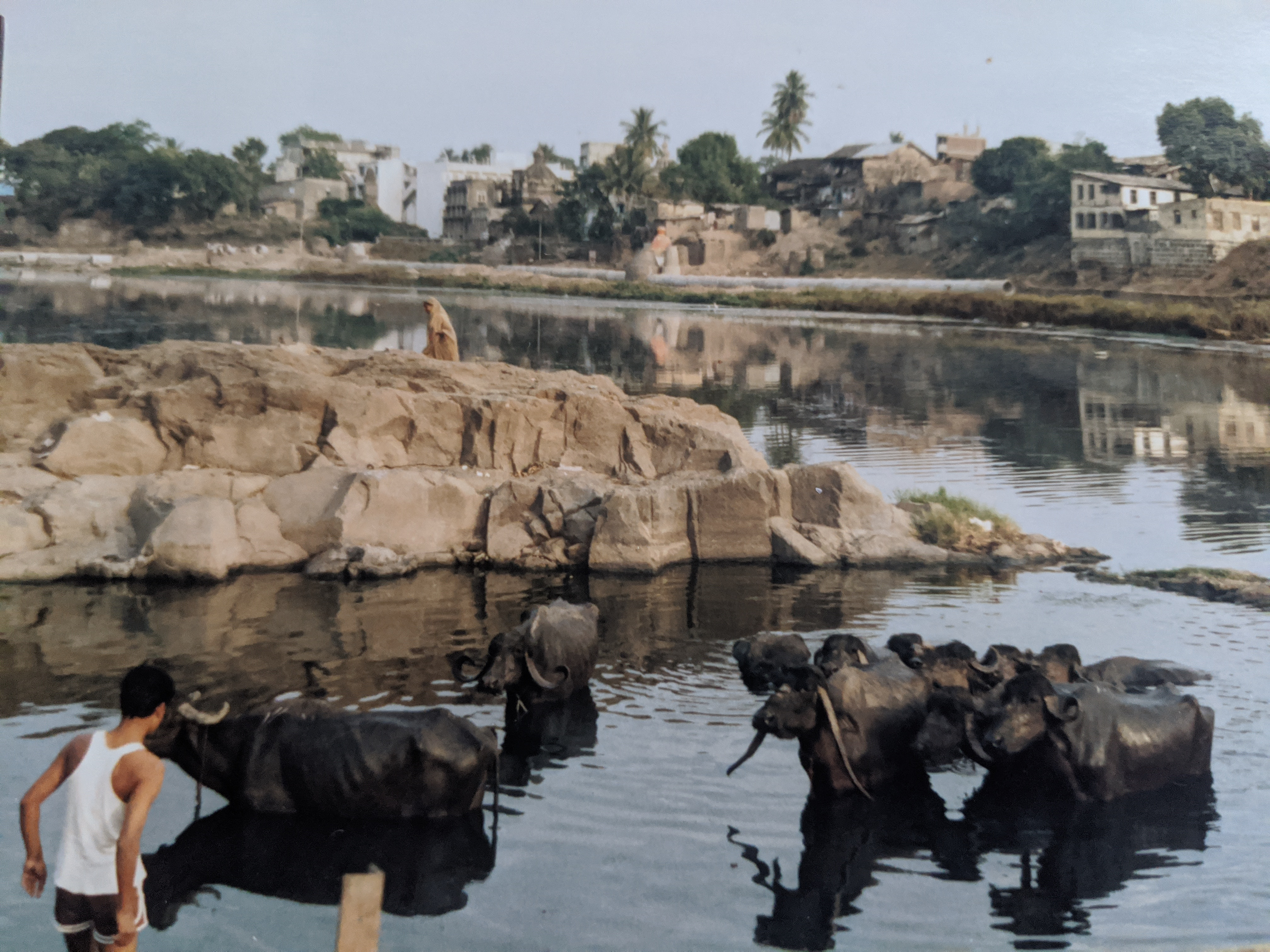
Water buffaloes being washed in the Mutha river of Pune, India

== In Europe and the Mediterranean ==
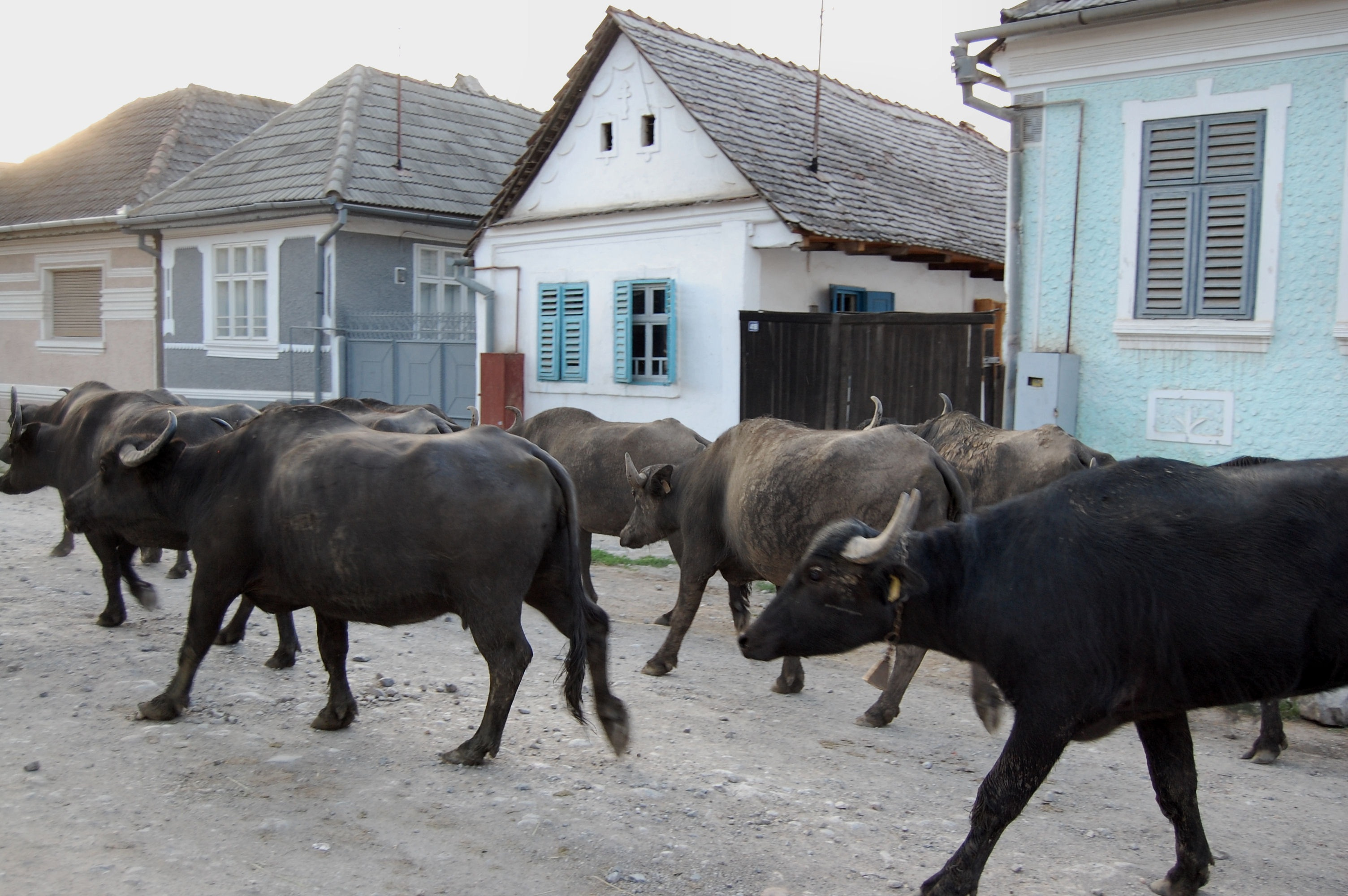
Buffaloes in Romania

The Danube Delta, one of sites where water buffaloes have been introduced in the wild for environmental managements

Water buffaloes were probably introduced to Europe from India or other eastern sources. In Italy, the Longobard King Agilulf is said to have received water buffaloes around 600 AD. These were probably a present from the Khan of the Avars, a Turkic nomadic tribe that dwelt near the Danube River at the time. Sir H. Johnston knew of a herd of water buffaloes presented by a King of Naples to the Bey of Tunis in the mid-19th century that had resumed the feral state in northern Tunis.

European water buffaloes are all of the river-type and considered to be of the same breed named the Mediterranean buffalo. In Italy, the Mediterranean type was particularly selected and is called the Mediterranea Italiana buffalo to distinguish it from other European breeds, which differ genetically. Mediterranean buffalo are also kept in Romania, Bulgaria, Greece, Serbia, Albania, Kosovo, and North Macedonia, with a few hundred in the United Kingdom, Ireland, Germany, the Netherlands, Switzerland, and Hungary. Little exchange of breeding water buffaloes has occurred among countries, so each population has its own phenotypic features and performances. In Bulgaria, they were crossbred with the Indian Murrah breed, and in Romania, some were crossbred with Bulgarian Murrah. As of 2016, about 13,000 buffaloes were in Romania, down from 289,000 in 1989.

Populations in Turkey are of the Anatolian buffalo breed.

Some domestic breeds may be related to the extinct, native water buffaloes (Bubalus murrensis), and Rewilding Europe and other environmental organizations utilize specific breeds for vegetation control (conservation grazing) and rewilding (Pleistocene rewilding) to promote local biodiversities (as a replacement to B. murrensis and other extinct bovids like Aurochs), such as among the Danube Delta and other important wildlife habitats, and agricultural lands.

== In Australia ==
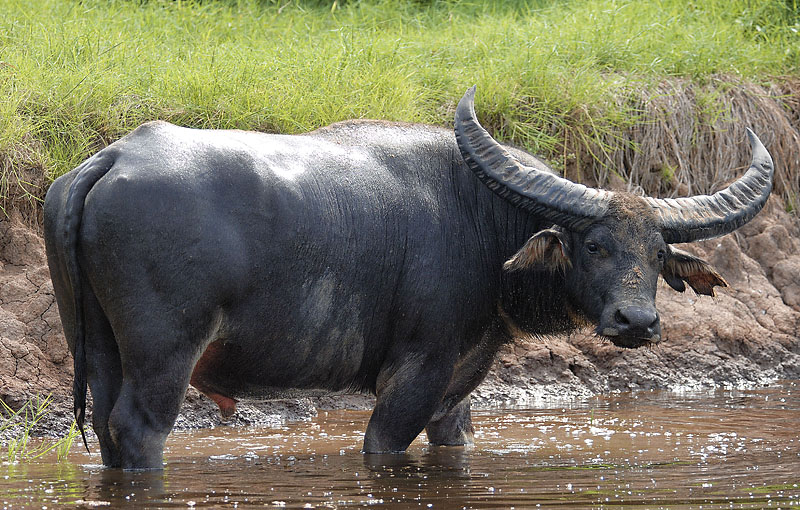
Opinions upon environmental impacts of introduced feral animals as potential proxies to extinct endemic megafaunas are divided in Australia, including water buffaloes

Between 1824 and 1849, swamp buffaloes were introduced into the Northern Territory, from Timor and Kisar and probably other islands in the Indonesian archipelago, to provide meat and hide. When the third attempt at settlement by the British on the Cobourg Peninsula was abandoned in 1849, the buffaloes were released. In the 1880s, a few river buffaloes were imported from India to Darwin for milk. Water buffalo have been the main grazing animals on the subcoastal plains and river basins between Darwin and Arnhem Land (the "Top End") since the 1880s. As a result, they were hunted in the Top End from 1885 until 1980.

They consequently became feral and established stable populations in the biome which contains few potential predators, saltwater crocodiles and dingoes, the latter of which can only prey on the younger animals. Like many other introduced megafauna, feral buffaloes' influences upon Australian ecosystem (and differences from roles once filled by now-extinct Australian megafaunas) are largely uncertain. and evaluations of their ecological effects (positive or negative) and perspectives on their treatments (to accept their presences or to cull) are divided.

In the early 1960s, an estimated population of 150,000 to 200,000 water buffaloes was living in the plains and nearby areas. The commencement of the brucellosis and tuberculosis campaign (BTEC) resulted in a huge culling program to reduce water buffalo herds to a fraction of the numbers that were reached in the 1980s. The BTEC was finished when the Northern Territory was declared free of the disease in 1997. Numbers dropped dramatically as a result of the campaign, but had recovered to an estimated 150,000 animals across northern Australia in 2008, and up to an estimated 200,000 by 2022. Both swamp and river buffaloes exist in feral populations, but swamp buffaloes are more prevalent than river buffaloes.

=== Uses ===
During the 1950s, Australian water buffaloes were hunted for their skins and meat, which was exported and used in the local trade. In the late 1970s, live exports were made to Cuba and continued later into other countries. Swamp buffaloes are now crossed with river buffaloes in artificial insemination programs, and are kept in many areas of Australia. Some of these crossbreeds are used for milk production. Melville Island is a popular hunting location, where a steady population up to 4,000 individuals exists. Safari outfits are run from Darwin to Melville Island and other locations in the Top End, often with the use of bush pilots; buffalo horns, which can measure up to a record of 3.1 m (10 ft) tip-to-tip, are prized hunting trophies.

Water buffaloes were exported live to Indonesia until 2011, at a rate of about 3,000 per year. After the live export ban that year, the exports dropped to zero, and had not resumed as of June 2013. Tom Dawkins, CEO of NT Buffalo Industry Council, said in May 2022 that culling should be a last resort, given the flourishing and growing live export trade and economic benefits for Aboriginal people. By the end of 2021, cattle exports to Indonesia had dropped to the lowest level since 2012, while demand for buffalo was growing both in Australia and in Southeast Asia.

=== Significance to Aboriginal peoples ===
"Nganabbarru" is the Bininj Kunwok word for buffalo, which are represented in rock art paintings at Djabidjbakalloi. The buffalo left behind after the failed British attempt at settlement became a threat to the local Aboriginal peoples, as they had no guns at that time. As the herds expanded across into Arnhem Land, some local people seized the chance to hunt the animals for their hides in the 1880s, as they did not belong to anyone, unlike sheep and cattle. The industry continues to provide employment opportunities and income for traditional owners.

== In South America ==
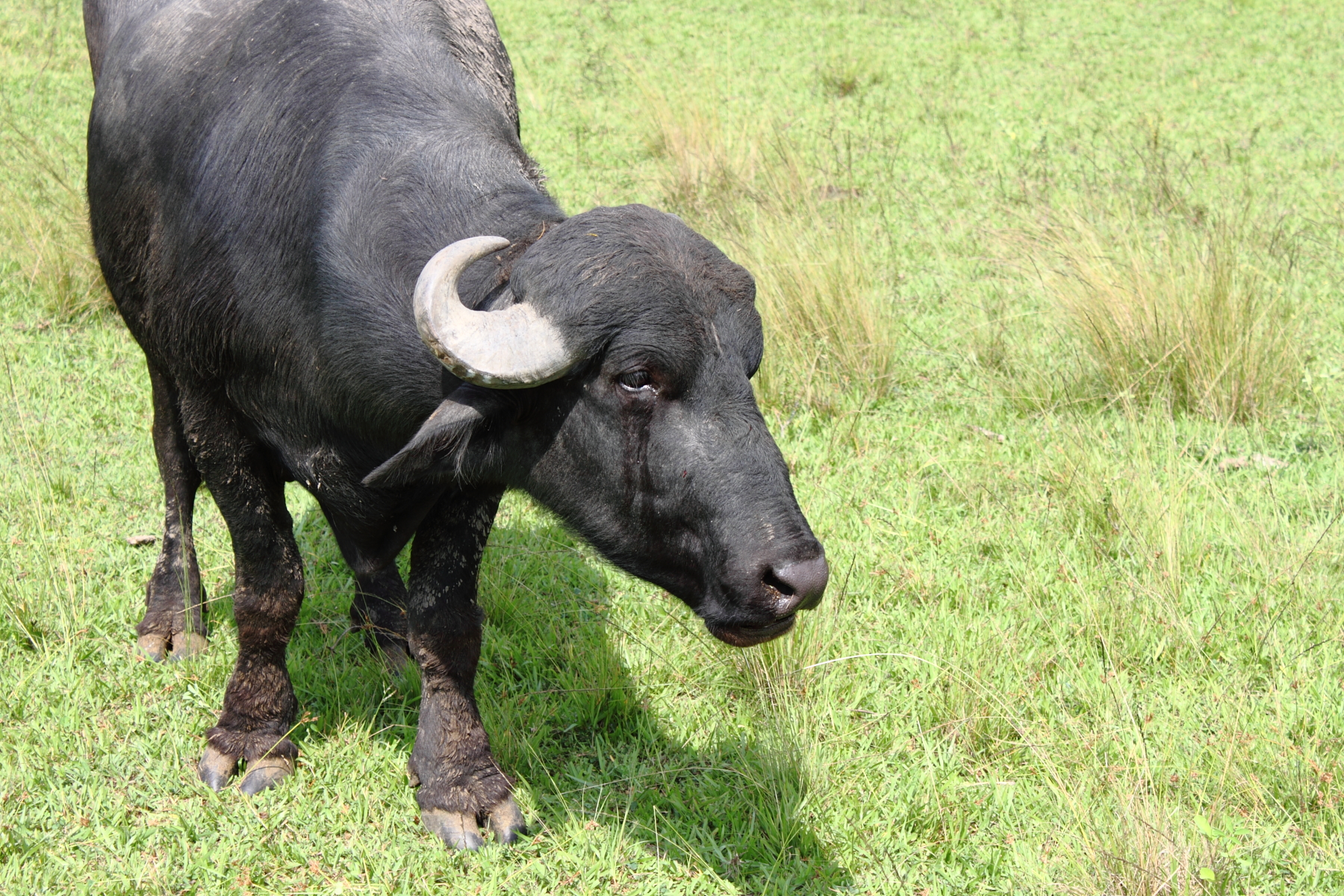
A Murrah buffalo on a Brazilian farm

Water buffaloes were introduced into the Amazon River basin in 1895. They are now extensively used there for meat and dairy production. In 2005, the water buffalo herd in the Brazilian Amazon stood at roughly 1.6 million head, of which 460,000 were located in the lower Amazon floodplains. The breeds used include the Mediterranean from Italy, the Murrah and Jafarabadi from India, and the carabao from the Philippines. The official Brazilian herd number in 2019 is 1.39 million head.

During the 1970s, small herds were imported to Costa Rica, Ecuador, Cayenne, Panama, Suriname, Guyana, and Venezuela.

In Argentina, many game ranches raise water buffaloes for commercial hunting.

Other important herds in South America are Colombia (>300.000), Argentina (>100.000) and Venezuela with unconfirmed reports ranging from 200 to 500 thousand head.

Akin to Australia, South America has lost the majority of its native terrestrial megafauna; feral animals including water buffaloes may (or may not) contribute to the local biodiversity and ecosystems as new ecosystem engineers and keystone species in the Anthropocene epoch, although information and researches are insufficient to assess the significances (or harmfulness) of such animals.

== In North America ==
In 1974, four water buffaloes were imported to the United States from Guam to be studied at the University of Florida. In February 1978, the first herd arrived for commercial farming. Until 2002, only one commercial breeder was in the United States. Water buffalo meat is imported from Australia. Until 2011, water buffaloes were raised in Gainesville, Florida, from young obtained from zoo overflow. They were used primarily for meat production, and frequently sold as hamburger. Other U.S. ranchers use them for production of high-quality mozzarella cheese. Water buffaloes are also kept in the Caribbean, specifically in Trinidad and Tobago, Cuba and Jamaica.
