= Turning Peel =

Pizzeria in Portland, Oregon, U.S.

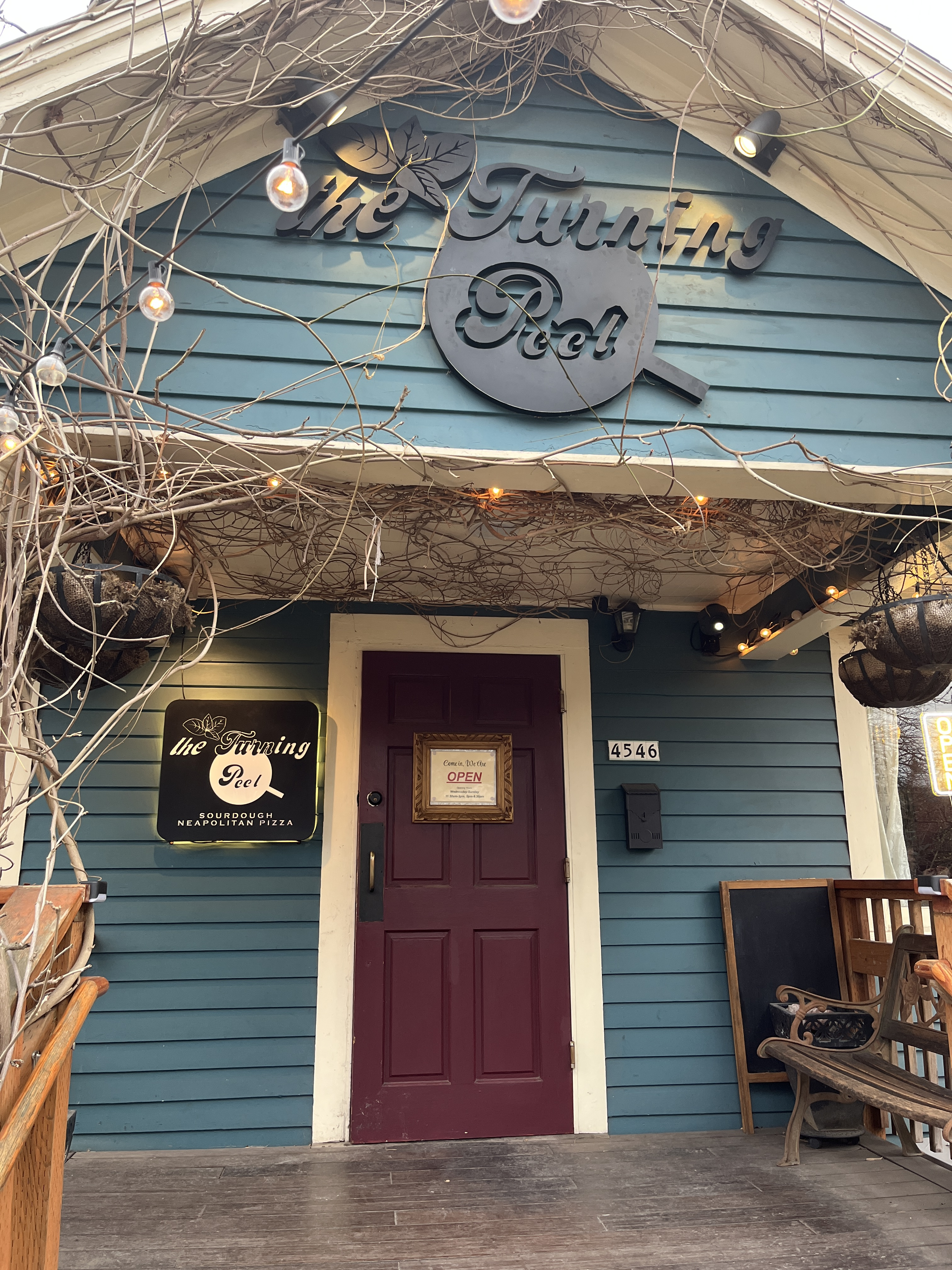
- The restaurant's exterior, 2025
- Interactive map of Turning Peel

Restaurant information
- Established: 2023
- Owner: Candy Yiu
- Location: 4546 Southeast Division Street, Portland, Multnomah, Oregon, 97206, United States
- Coordinates: 45.5051°N 122.6151°W
- Website: theturningpeel.com

Turning Peel is a pizzeria in Portland, Oregon, United States. Owner Candy Yiu opened the restaurant on Division Street in southeast Portland's Richmond neighborhood in 2023, in the former Malka space. Turning Peel specializes in Neapolitan pizzas with sourdough. The menu also includes salads, soups, and desserts such as cheesecake and tiramisu. The pizzeria has garnered a positive reception.

== Description ==
The pizzeria Turning Peel operates on Division Street in southeast Portland, Oregon's Richmond neighborhood. It is housed in a "stately" bungalow that "has all the charm and colorful clutter of a favorite worldly aunt’s house", according to Eater Portland. The patio is covered with grape vines; the Portland Mercury has described it as "one of the cutest dog friendly and ADA accessible patios in town". Turning Peel uses a Pizza Master oven that can reach 900 degrees. According to Eater Portland, the restaurant's "zero-waste ethos ... sees any leftover pizza dough become next day's pizza bread, free to take".

=== Menu ===
Turning Peel serves Neapolitan pizzas with sourdough. Varieties include margherita, pepperoni, and the Summer Splash, which has season vegetables such as cherry tomatoes, corn, morels, and yellow zucchini. The special Fall Pie has pumpkin sauce, slices of roasted pumpkin, red onion, Italian sausage, mozzarella, and sage. Other pizza toppings include arugula, garlic, sausage, Parmesan, prosciutto, purple cauliflower, and vegan mozzarella. In addition to pizza, the menu includes salads, soups, and marinated olives. Dessert options include cheesecake and tiramisu.

== History ==
Turning Peel operates in the space that previously housed the restaurant Malka. In July 2023, Brooke Jackson-Glidden of Eater Portland described plans for Malka co-owner Candy Yiu to covert the space into Turning Peel. Yiu hoped to open the new restaurant in late August 2023.

== Reception ==
Turning Peel ranked first in The Oregonian's 2024 and 2026 lists of the five best pizza establishments in the Portland metropolitan area, as part of the Readers Choice Awards. The pizza margherita was included in Willamette Week's 2026 list of the city's best "cheap eats".

In Eater Portland's 2025 overview of the best pizzas in the metropolitan area, Ben Coleman wrote: "The sourdough crusts are precisely dialed in for maximum chew with just a hint of fermented tang. The sauce is a particular highlight: bright and almost jammy without overwhelming the classic balance of flavors. The margherita showcases the quality ingredients and attention to detail and pairs sublimely with a tiny cup of espresso and a warm evening." The website's Zoe Baillargeon included Turning Peel in a 2025 list of the best restaurants on Division Street.

== See also ==
- Pizza in Portland, Oregon
