= Buffalo mozzarella =

Italian cheese

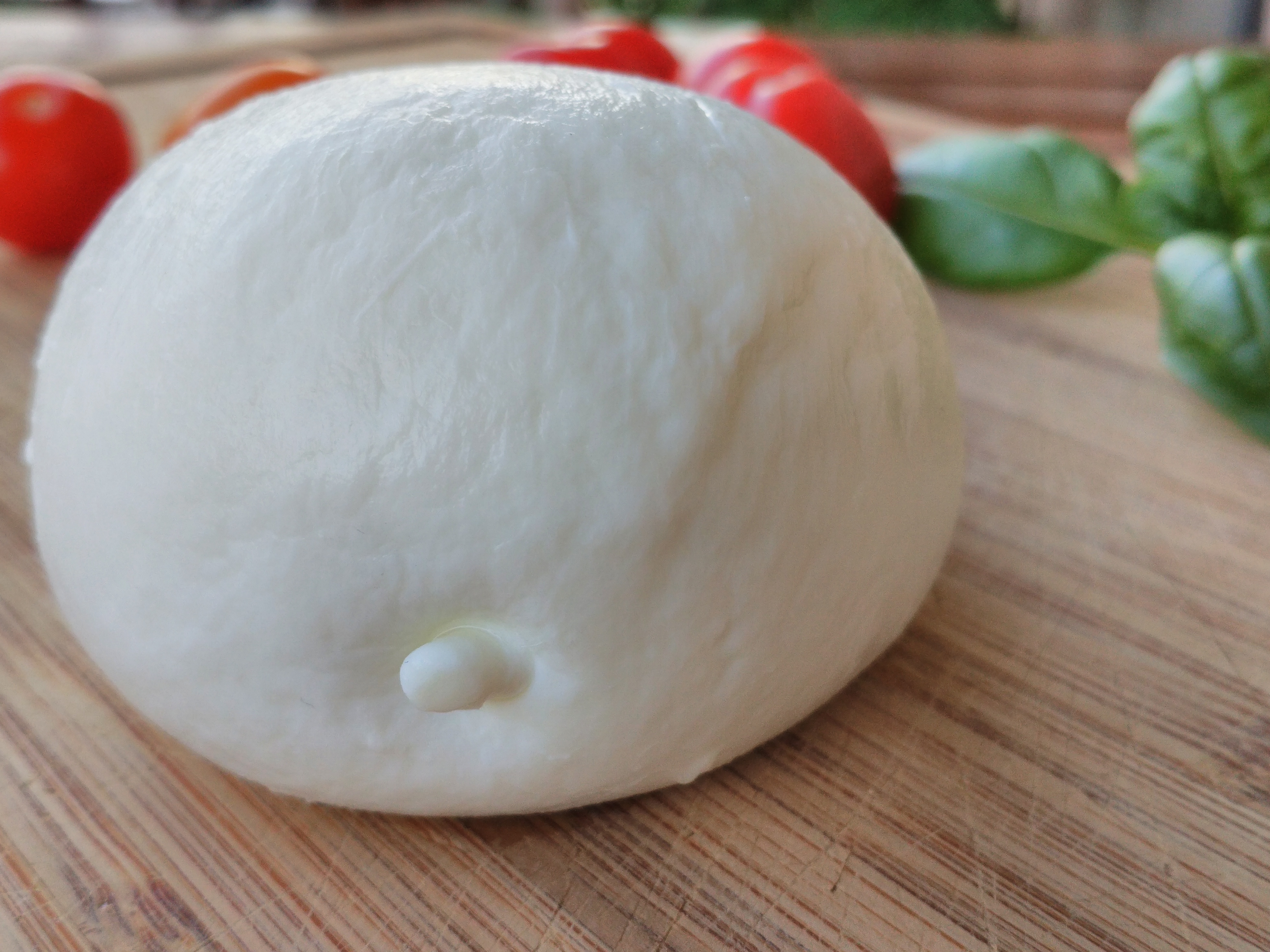
- Other names: Mozzarella di bufala (Italian), muzzarella 'e vufera (Neapolitan)
- Country of origin: Italy
- Source of milk: Italian Mediterranean buffalo
- Texture: Fresh
- Certification: Mozzarella di bufala campana: Italy: Denominazione di origine: 1993; EU: PDO: 1996

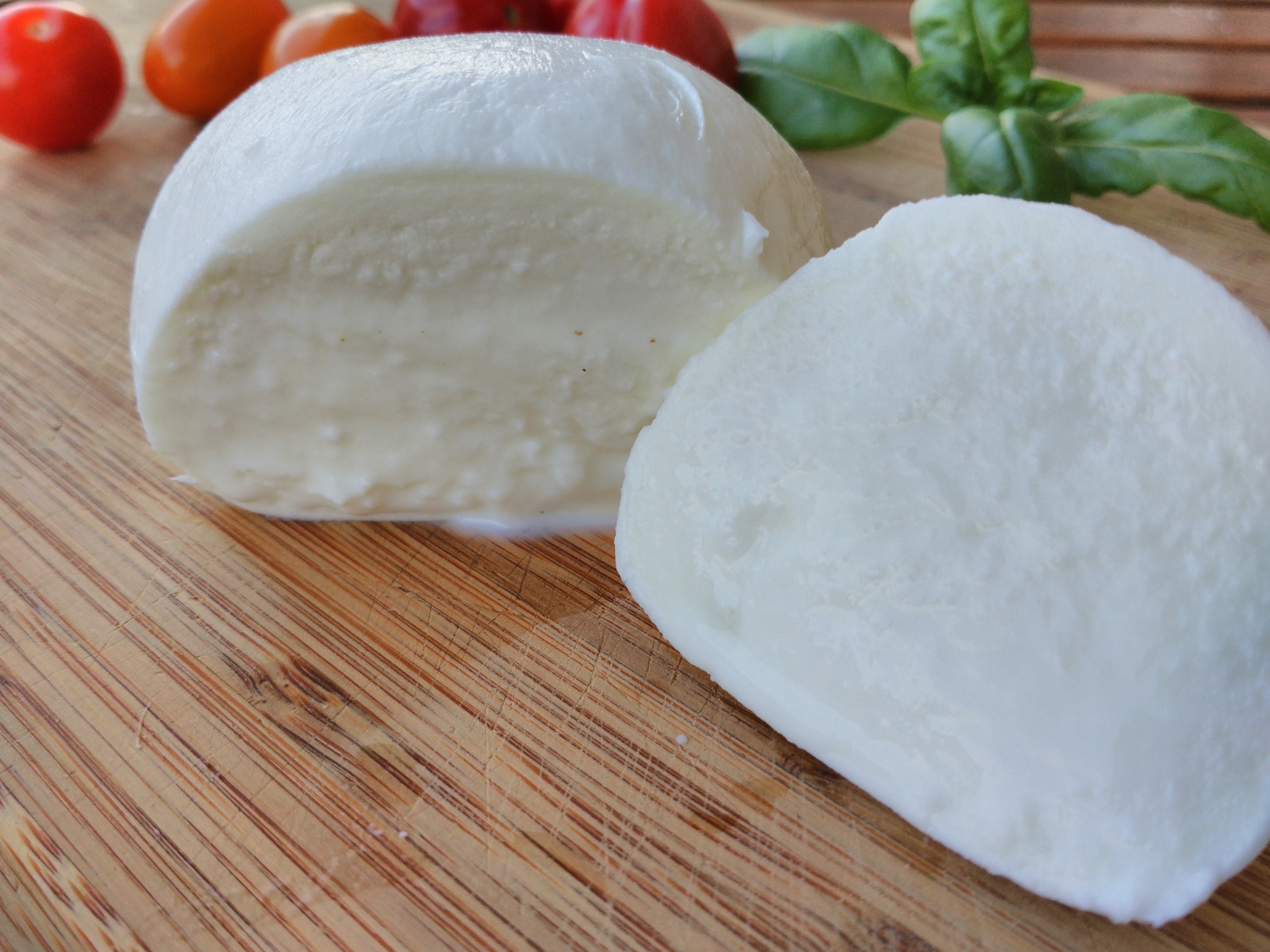
Buffalo mozzarella

Buffalo mozzarella (Italian: mozzarella di bufala; Neapolitan: muzzarella 'e vufera) is a mozzarella made from the milk of the Italian Mediterranean buffalo. A fresh, soft pasta filata cheese, it is traditionally produced in Campania, particularly in the provinces of Caserta and Salerno.

Since 1996, mozzarella di bufala campana is also registered as an EU and UK protected designation of origin (PDO) product. The protected designation requires that it be produced according to a traditional recipe in selected areas of Campania, southern Lazio, northern Apulia, and the Molise town of Venafro.

In 2024 the producers' consortium certified an output of 55,718 tonnes of mozzarella di bufala campana PDO, roughly 40% of which was exported, with France as the leading foreign market. With a turnover of more than half a billion euros, it is the fourth Italian PDO product by production value, after Grana Padano, Parmigiano Reggiano, and prosciutto di Parma.

== Areas of production ==
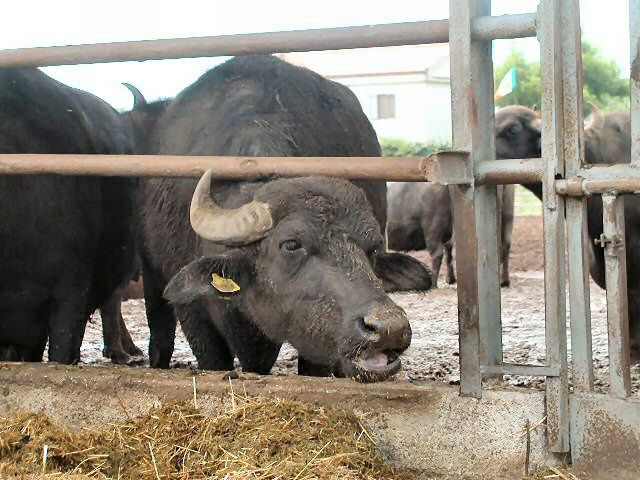
Buffalo cow

In Italy, the cheese is produced nationwide using Italian Mediterranean buffalo milk under the government's official name mozzarella di latte di bufala because Italian buffalo are found in all Italian regions. The mozzarella di bufala campana, which has denominazione di origine protetta status, is produced only within a defined area which includes: in Campania, the whole of the province of Caserta and of the province of Salerno, and parts of those of Benevento and Naples; in Lazio, parts of the provinces of Frosinone, Latina and Rome; in Molise, part of the comune of Venafro; and in Puglia, part of the province of Foggia. Buffalo mozzarella is a €300m ($330m) per year industry in Italy, which produces around 33,000 tonnes of it every year, with 16 percent sold abroad (mostly in the European Union). France and Germany are the main importers, but sales to Japan and Russia are growing.

Apart from in Italy, buffalo mozzarella is manufactured in many other countries around the world. There are producers in Switzerland, the United States, Australia, Mexico, Brazil, Canada, China, Japan, Venezuela, Argentina, the United Kingdom, Ireland, Spain, Sweden, Colombia, Thailand, Israel, Egypt, India, and South Africa, all using milk from their own herds of water buffaloes.

== Mozzarella di bufala campana ==
Buffalo mozzarella from Campania bears the trademark mozzarella di bufala campana. In 1993, it was granted denominazione di origine status, in 1996 the trademark received the registry number 1107/96, and in 2008 the European Union granted protected geographical status and the PDO designation. The Consorzio per la Tutela del Formaggio di Bufala Campana (lit. 'Consortium for the Protection of the Buffalo Cheese of Campania') is an organization of approximately 200 producers that, under Italian law, is responsible for the "protection, surveillance, promotion and marketing" of mozzarella di bufala campana. The mozzarella industry in Italy resulted from 34,990 recorded females of the Italian Mediterranean breed, which account for ≈30% of the total dairy buffalo population (this percentage does not exist in any other country) and have a mean production of 2,356 kg milk in 270 days of lactation, with 8% fat, and 4.63% protein.

== History ==
The history of water buffalo in Italy is not settled. One theory is that Asian water buffalo were brought to Italy by Goths during the migrations of the early medieval period. However, according to the Consorzio per la Tutela del Formaggio Mozzarella di Bufala Campana, the "most likely hypothesis" is that they were introduced by Normans from Sicily in 1000, and that Arabs had introduced them into Sicily. The Consorzio per la Tutela also refers to fossil evidence (the prehistoric European Water Buffalo, Bubalus murrensis) suggesting that water buffalo may have originated in Italy. A fourth theory is that water buffalo were brought from Mesopotamia into the Near East by Arabs and then introduced into Europe by pilgrims and returning crusaders.

A 2020 scientific review states that the Mediterranean buffalo descends from river buffalo introduced to Europe from India during the eighth-century Arab occupation of Sicily and southern Italy.

"In ancient times, the buffalo was a familiar sight in the countryside, since it was widely used as a draught animal in ploughing compact and watery terrains, both because of its strength and the size of its hooves, which do not sink too deeply into moist soils."

Pasta filata cheeses, the family to which mozzarella belongs, are considered to have originated more broadly in the northern Mediterranean, encompassing Italy, Greece, the Balkans, Turkey and Eastern Europe. The review cites ancient Latin authors including Pliny and Columella as documenting such cheeses in southern Italy, and notes that Columella described a technique associated with stretched curd.

References to cheese products made from water buffalo milk appeared for the first time at the beginning of the 12th century. In 1294, records attest that provola cheeses were sent weekly to Naples from the royal estate of Santa Felicita in the territory of Foggia, although it is uncertain whether they were made from buffalo milk. Buffalo mozzarella became widespread throughout the south of Italy from the second half of the 18th century, before which it had been produced only in small quantities.

Production in and around Naples was briefly interrupted during World War II, when retreating German troops slaughtered the area's water buffalo herds, and recommenced a few years after the armistice was signed.

=== 2008 dioxin scare ===
On March 21, 2008, The New York Times published an article which reported the difficulties encountered by the Campania producers of mozzarella in avoiding the contamination of dairy products with dioxins, especially in the Caserta area, and managing the resulting crisis in local sales. The article, later referenced by blogs and other publications, referred to the Naples waste management issue and referred to other pieces published by the International Herald Tribune and various other national and international newspapers.

A chain reaction followed, in which several countries including Japan, China, Russia, and Germany took various measures ranging from the mere raising of the attention threshold to the suspension of imports. The Italian institutions activated almost immediately, even in response to pressing requests from the European Union, a series of checks and suspended, in some cases, the sale of dairy products from the incriminated provinces. Tests had shown levels of dioxins higher than normal in at least 14% of samples taken in the provinces of Naples, Caserta, and Avellino. In the provinces of Salerno and Benevento, no control indicated dioxins positivity.

In any case, the contamination has affected, in a limited defined manner, the farms used to produce buffalo mozzarella PDO. The Italian General Confederation of Labour reported a 40% reduction of workforce in the Terra di Lavoro for 2013. On 19 April, China definitively removed the ban on mozzarella, originally activated on 28 March 2008, and tests held in December 2013 in Germany on behalf of four Italian consumer associations have highlighted dioxin and heavy metal levels at least five times lower than the legal limit.

== Production stages ==
To produce 1 kg (2 lb 3 oz) of cheese, a cheese maker requires 8 kg (18 lb) of cow milk but only 5 kg (11 lb) of buffalo milk. Producing 1 kg of butter requires 14 kg (31 lb) of cow milk but only 10 kg (22 lb) of buffalo milk.

The steps required to produce buffalo mozzarella are:

1. Milk storage (raw buffalo milk stored in steel containers).
2. Milk heating (thermic treatment to the liquid, then poured into a cream separator).
3. Curdling (by introduction of natural whey).
4. Curd maturation (the curd lies in tubs to reduce the acidifying processes and reach a pH value of about 4.95).
5. Spinning (hot water is poured on the curd to soften it, obtaining pasta filata).
6. Shaping (with special rotating shaper machines).
7. Cooling (by immersion in cold water).
8. Pickling (by immersion in pickling tubs containing the original whey).
9. Packaging (in special films cut as bags or in small basins and plastic).

== Nutrition ==
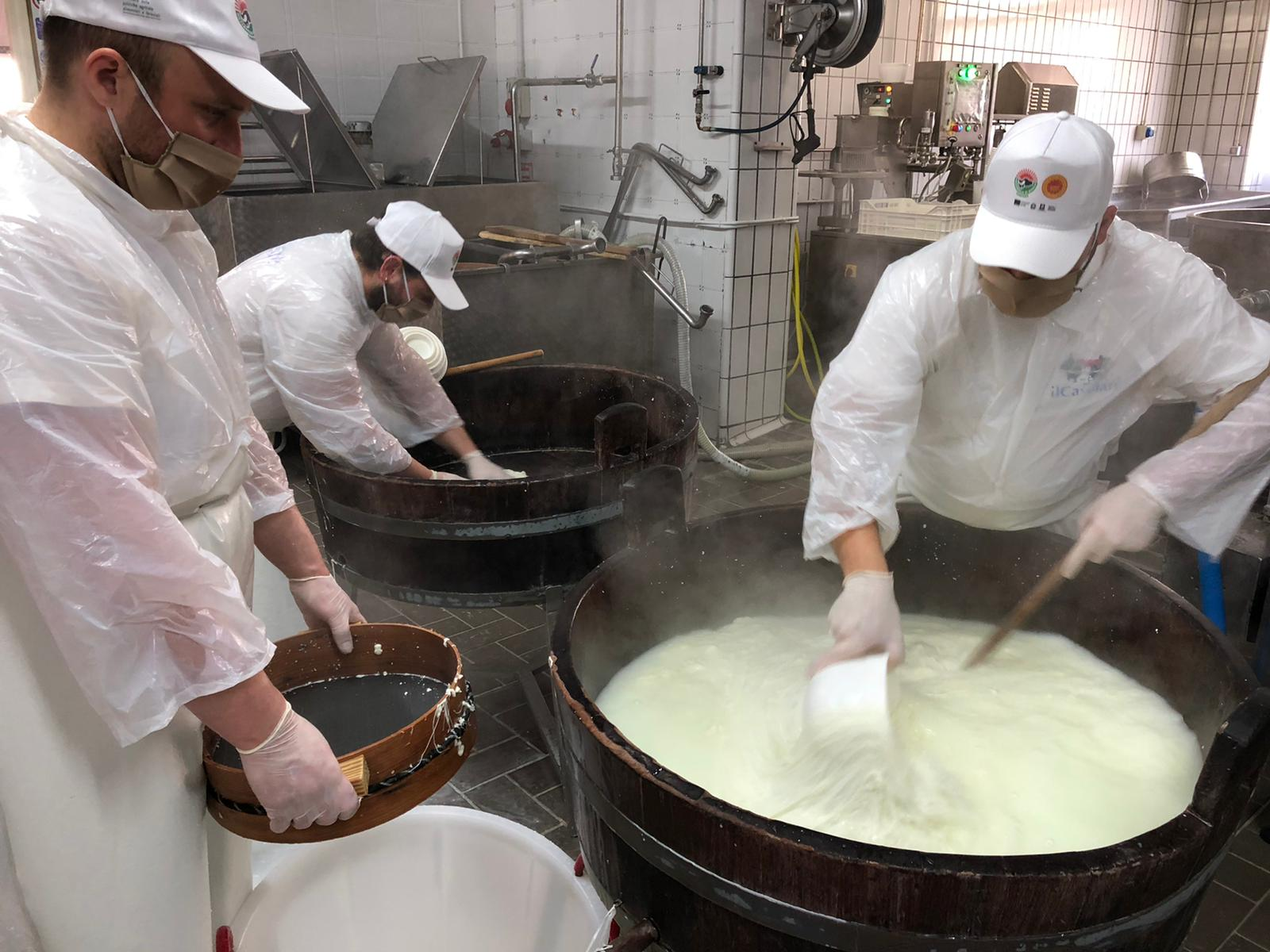
The master cheesemakers in the act of spinning mozzarella di bufala campana PDO

The nutritional composition of buffalo mozzarella differs from that of buffalo milk, because cheesemaking concentrates milk solids while removing part of the water, lactose and soluble components with the whey.

Nutritional composition of mozzarella di bufala campana PDO per 100 g (3.5 oz)
Nutrient	Amount
Energy	1075 kJ
Protein	14.1 g
Fat	21.7 g
Available carbohydrate	1.4 g
Water	61.3 g
Fibre	0 g
Calcium	367 mg
Sodium	211 mg
Cholesterol	52 mg
Vitamin A	203 μg retinol equivalent

The producers' consortium gives similar average values for the finished PDO cheese, listing per 100 g 17 g protein, 24 g fat, 0.4 g carbohydrate, 245 mg calcium, 320 mg phosphorus, less than 50–60 mg cholesterol, and less than 0.4 g lactose.

== Uses ==
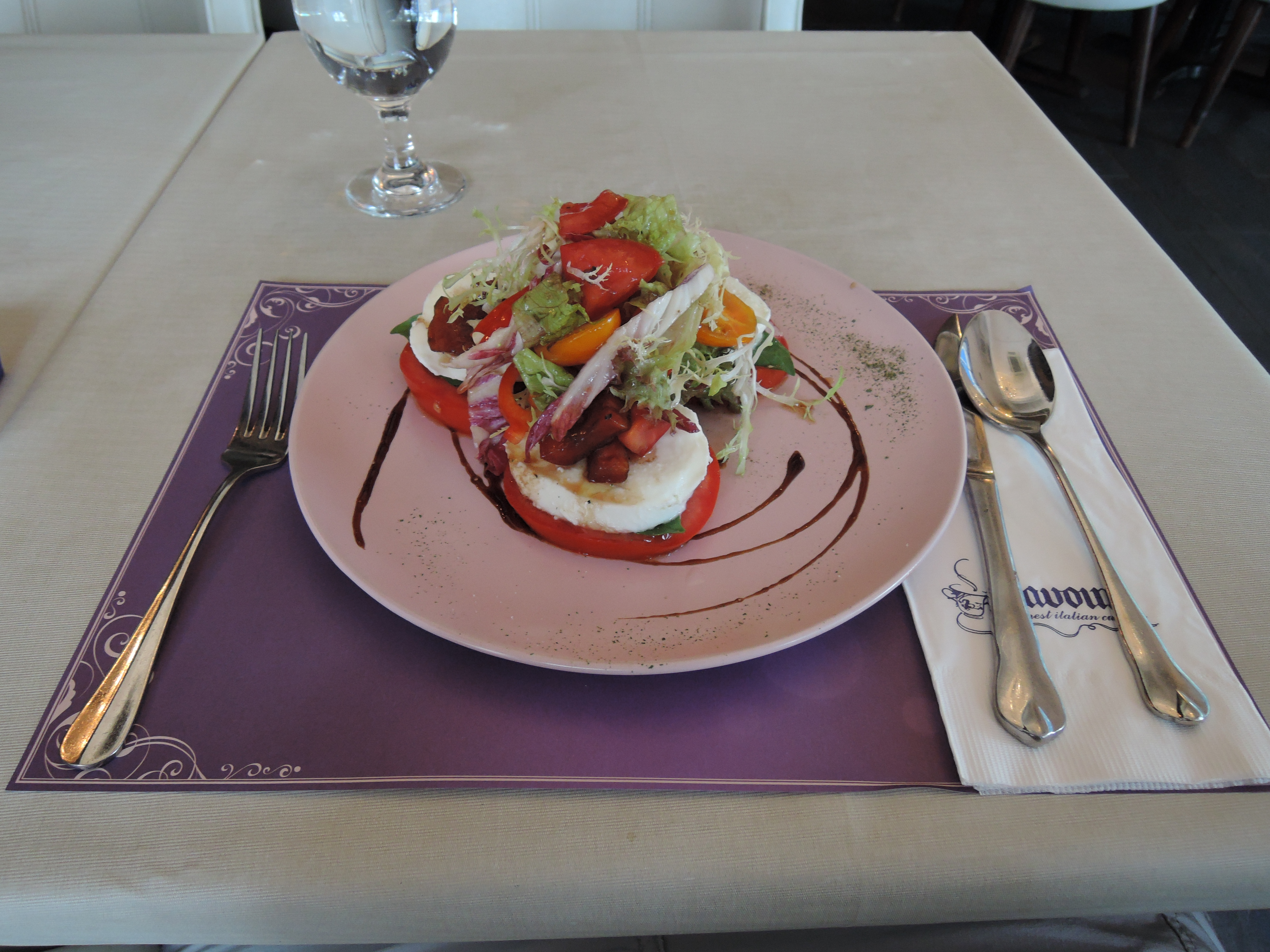
Sliced in a salad

Generally, buffalo mozzarella is eaten with calzone, vegetable, salad (for example, Caprese salad), on pizza (a low moisture content buffalo mozzarella is preferred), on grilled bread, with tomatoes, or by itself accompanied by olive oil.

== See also ==
- List of Italian PDO cheeses
- List of Italian cheeses
- List of stretch-curd cheeses
- List of water buffalo cheeses
