= Rangoon Bistro =

Burmese restaurant in Portland, Oregon, U.S.

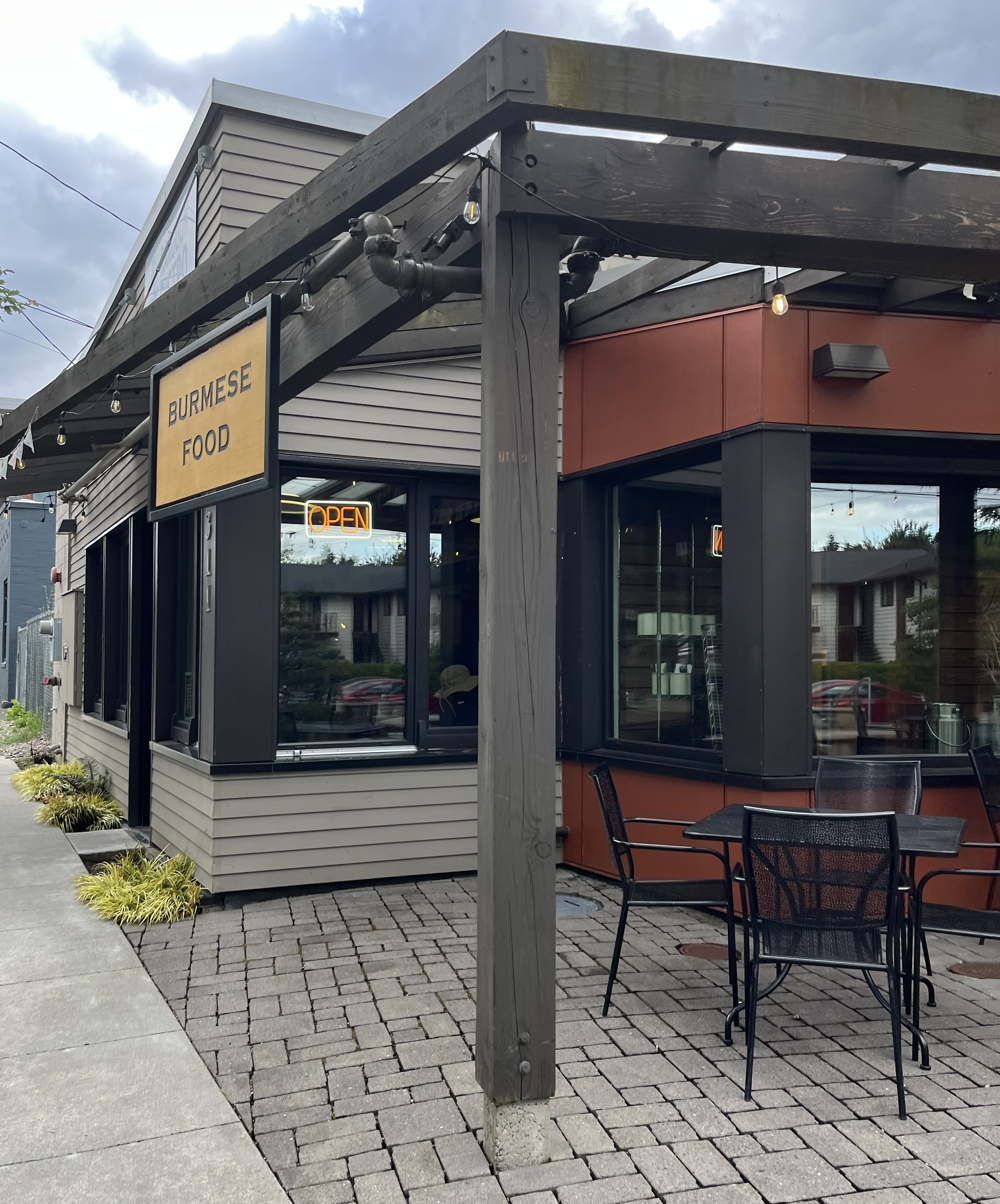
- Exterior of a location in southeast Portland, Oregon, 2025
- Interactive map of Rangoon Bistro

Restaurant information
- Food type: Burmese
- Location: 2311 Southeast 50th Avenue and 3747 N Mississippi, Portland, Multnomah, Oregon, 97215 97227, United States
- Coordinates: 45.5064°N 122.6114°W
- Website: rangoonbistropdx.com

Rangoon Bistro is a small chain of Burmese restaurants in Portland, Oregon, in the United States. The original brick and mortar restaurant operates in southeast Portland's Richmond neighborhood and a second location is on Mississippi Avenue in the north Portland part of the Boise neighborhood. Co-owned by David Sai, Alex Saw, and Nick Sherbo, the business initially operated as a pop-up and has garnered a positive reception.

== Description ==
The Burmese restaurant Rangoon Bistro has two locations in Portland, Oregon. The original restaurant is located in the Breathe Building, a community center at 50th Avenue and Division Street in southeast Portland's Richmond neighborhood, and a second location operates on Mississippi Avenue in the north Portland part of the Boise neighborhood.

Eater Portland has said the restaurant "specializes in Pacific Northwestern-Burmese cuisine, using Oregon-grown produce for thokes and noodle dishes". The menu includes bone-in fried chicken marinated by lemongrass, curry leaf, and mild red chiles, served with a side of coconut rice, as well as salads such as the lahpet thoke with fermented tea leaves.

== History ==
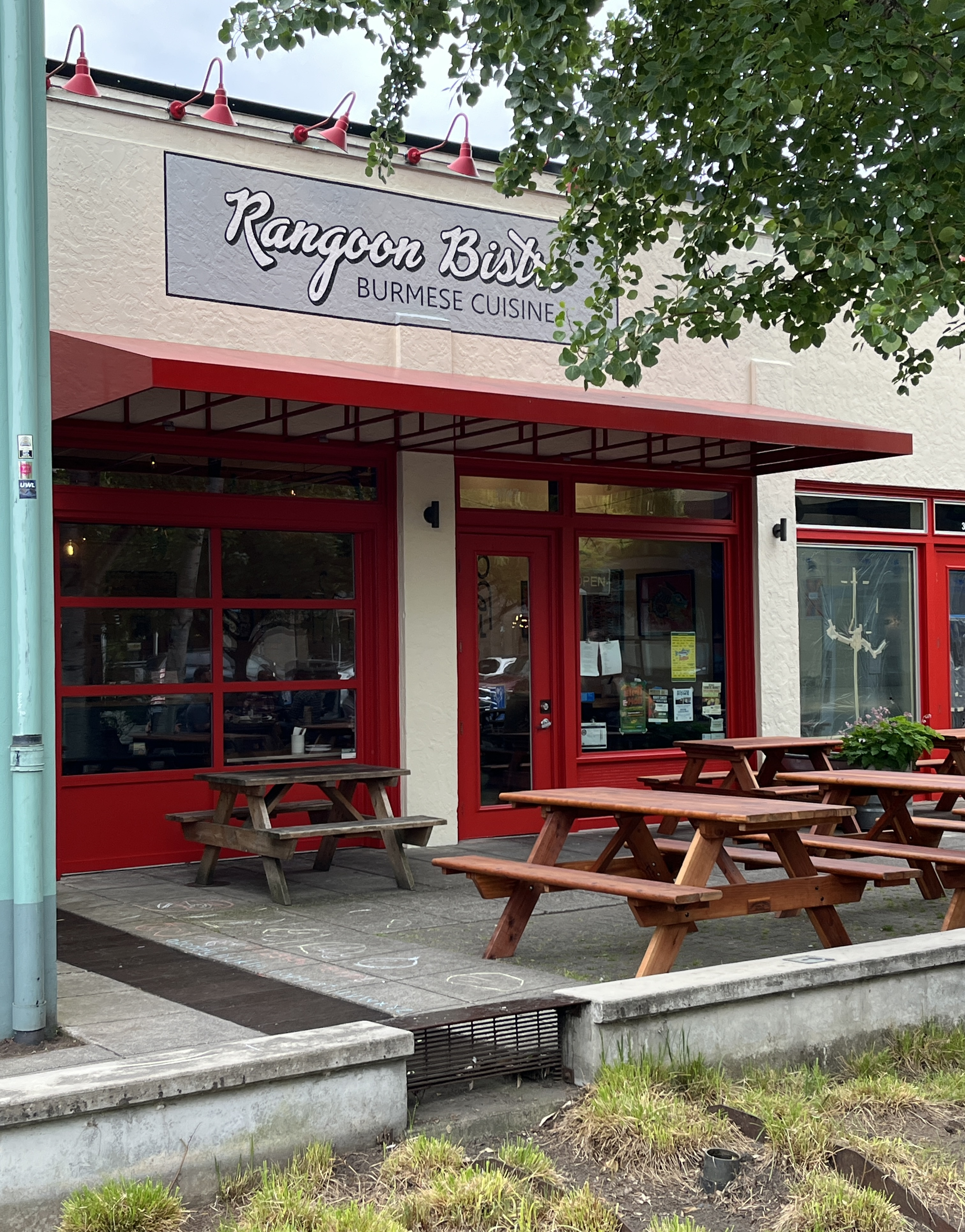
Exterior of the Boise location in 2025

Alex Saw launched Rangoon Bistro at the King Farmers Market in the 2010s, with assistance from David Sai and Nick Sherbo. The three have been credited as co-chefs, co-owners, and "co-everythings" of the restaurant. By 2020, Bollywood Theater, Langbaan, and Malka were hosting Rangoon as a pop-up restaurant. Brooke Jackson-Glidden of Eater Portland said the business operated as "something like a takeout-only Burmese cafe" in the Gotham Building, before moving into a brick and mortar space.

In 2024, owners announced plans to open a second location on North Mississippi Avenue. In January 2026, the business announced plans to move its Richmond location to the space that previously housed Deadshot, in southeast Portland's Hosford-Abernethy neighborhood.

== Reception ==
In 2022, Rangoon Bistro ranked ninth in The Oregonian's list of Portland's best new restaurants and won in the Best New Counter Service category of Eater Portland's annual Eater Awards. The website's Janey Wong wrote: "Rangoon Bistro has definitely become a go-to... The fried chicken ... is as close to my grandma's as I've ever had. Everything on the menu at Rangoon is delicious, but don't sleep on the fried chicken." Ron Scott and Thom Hilton included Rangoon in Eater Portland's 2023 overview of thirteen "real-deal" fried chicken eateries in the city. Hilton included the business in a 2024 "handy dining guide" to Mississippi Avenue, and Rangoon was also in the website's 2025 list of Portland's best restaurants for mid-week lunches. Paolo Bicchieri included the business in Eater Portland's 2025 overview of the city's best restaurants for lunch.

Bon Appétit included the large dumplings in a 2023 overview of the best dishes at new restaurants. Michael Russell ranked Rangoon Bistro number 34 in The Oregonian's list of Portland's best restaurants. The business was included in Time Out Portland's 2025 list of the city's eighteen best restaurants. Michael Russell included Rangoon Bistro in The Oregonian's 2025 list of the 21 best restaurants in southeast Portland. He also ranked Rangoon Bistro number 38 in The Oregonian's 2025 list of Portland's 40 best restaurants. The ghin salad was included in Willamette Week's 2026 list of the city's best "cheap eats".
