= Italian Mediterranean buffalo =

Italian breed of water buffalo

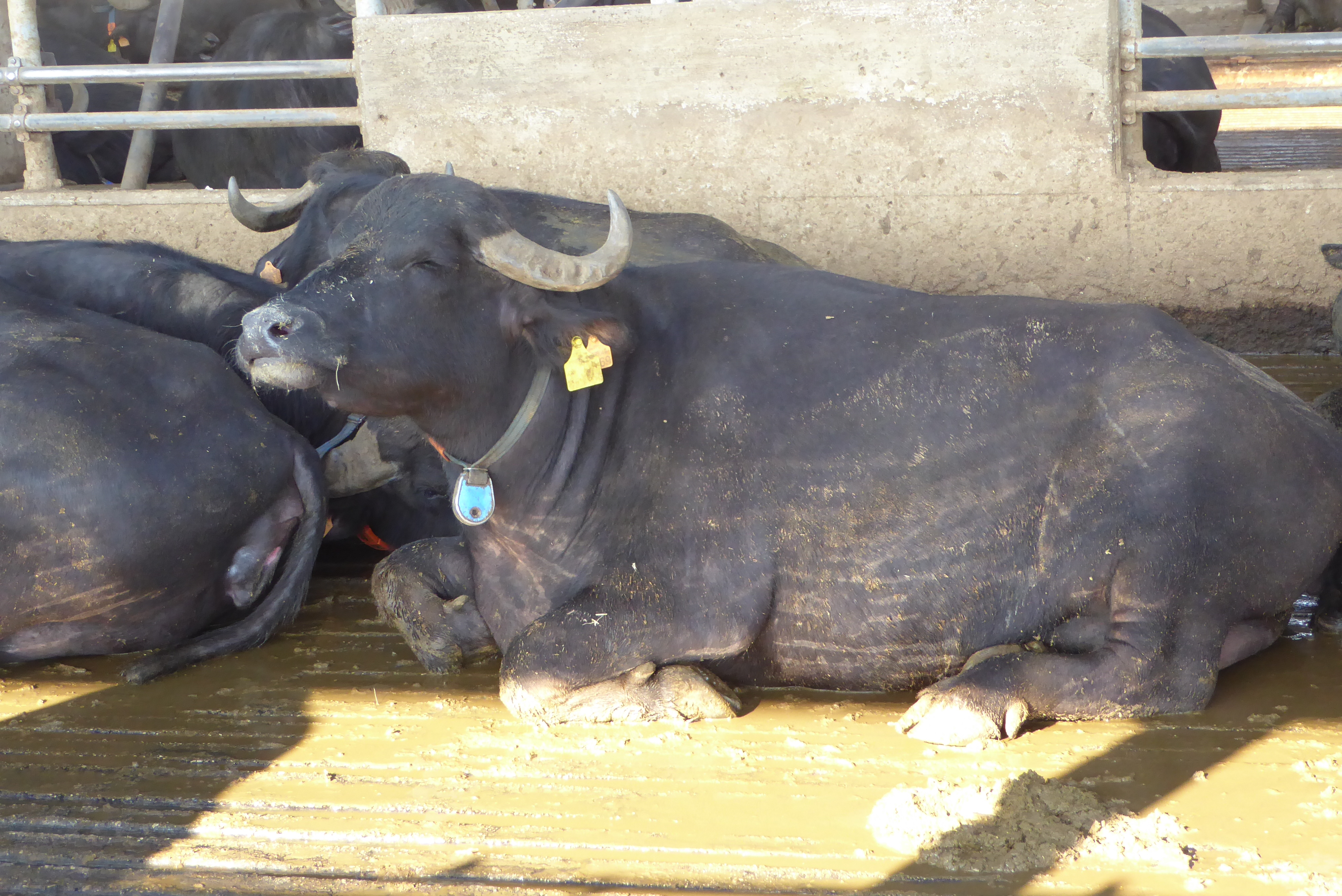
- Conservation status: FAO (2007): not listed; DAD-IS (2022): not at risk
- Country of origin: Italy
- Distribution: Throughout Italy, principally Campania
- Type: River
- Use: Dairy, meat; formerly draught

Traits
- Weight: Male: average 500–600 kilograms (1,100–1,300 lb) up to 800 kilograms (1,800 lb); Female: average 300–450 kilograms (660–990 lb) up to 650 kilograms (1,430 lb)
- Height: Male: average 143 centimetres (56 in); Female: average 135 centimetres (53 in)
- Skin colour: Dark slate-grey
- Coat: Black

The Italian Mediterranean buffalo is an Italian breed of water buffalo. It is of the river sub-type of water buffalo and is similar to the buffalo breeds of Hungary, Romania, and the Balkan countries. It is the only indigenous water buffalo breed in Italy. A herd-book was opened in 1980, and the breed was officially recognised in 2000.

== History ==
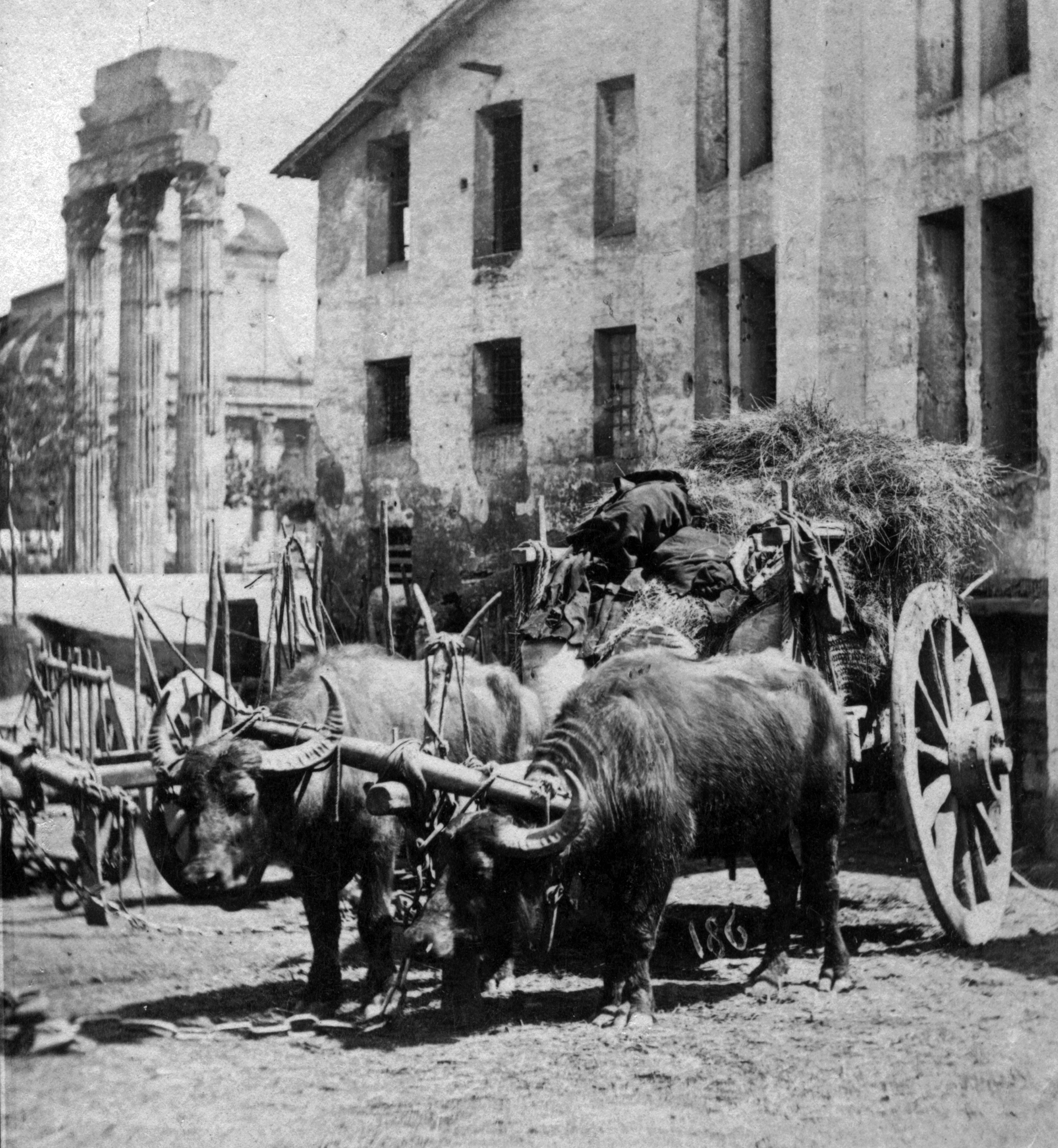
Draught water buffalo in the Roman Forum, 1900; on the left there are the three columns of the Temple of Castor and Pollux.

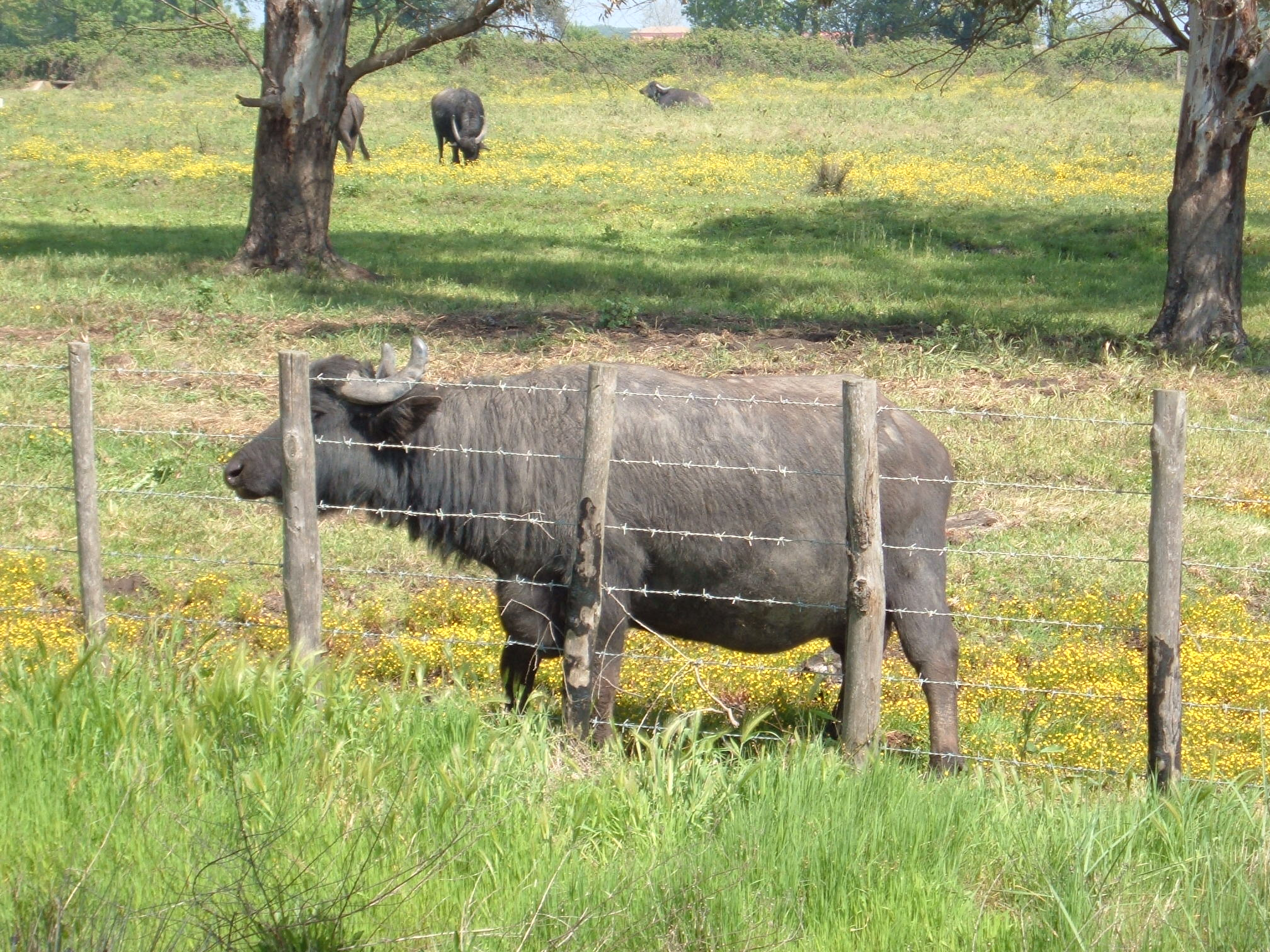
Cow in the Agro Pontino

There are conflicting hypotheses concerning the origins of the European water buffalo: one, based on fossil bones found in the valleys of the Elbe and the Rhine, is that it descends from the extinct European wild species Bubalus murrensis; others believe that water buffalo were brought to Europe in Roman times, or in the sixth and seventh centuries by invading peoples such as the Pannonian Avars, or later, by crusaders returning from Mesopotamia. A genomic study in 2020 gave some support to the first hypothesis.

In 1979, a national association of buffalo breeders, the Associazione Nazionale Allevatori Specie Bufalina, was formed, and a genealogical herd-book for the buffalo was opened in the following year. The Italian Mediterranean buffalo breed was officially recognised in 2000.

In 1953, the total number of buffalo in Italy was estimated at 40000 head. The numbers of buffalo reported by the Italian National Institute of Statistics in 2012 and 2013 were, by region:

Region	2012	2013
Basilicata	626	430
Calabria	778	271
Campania	260153	266236
Emilia–Romagna	158	409
Friuli-Venezia Giulia	80	39
Lazio	66546	69244
Lombardy	3394	3542
Marche	–	49709
Molise	1912	745
Piedmont	795	49
Puglia	7470	5999
Sardinia	5139	2507
Sicily	768	2454
Trentino–Alto Adige	8	–
Tuscany	110	48
Umbria	29	20
Veneto	895	957
Total	348861	402659

The largest numbers are reared in the provinces of Caserta and of Salerno, Campania, followed by those of Frosinone and of Latina, which although in Lazio fall within the area of production of the mozzarella di bufala campana.

== Characteristics ==
The Italian Mediterranean buffalo is black, with dark slate-grey skin and black hooves. White markings may be present on the head, on the lower legs or on the switch of the tail. Total albinism may occur, but is much less common than in the buffaloes of Asia, where the incidence of albinism is in the range 5%–8%.

Bulls commonly stand about 143 centimetres (56 in) at the withers, with a weight of some 500–600 kilograms (1,100–1,300 lb); they may reach weights of up to 800 kilograms (1,800 lb). Sexual dimorphism is less marked in domestic buffalo than in cattle; cows stand about 138 centimetres (54 in), with weights in the range 300–450 kilograms (660–990 lb).

== Use ==
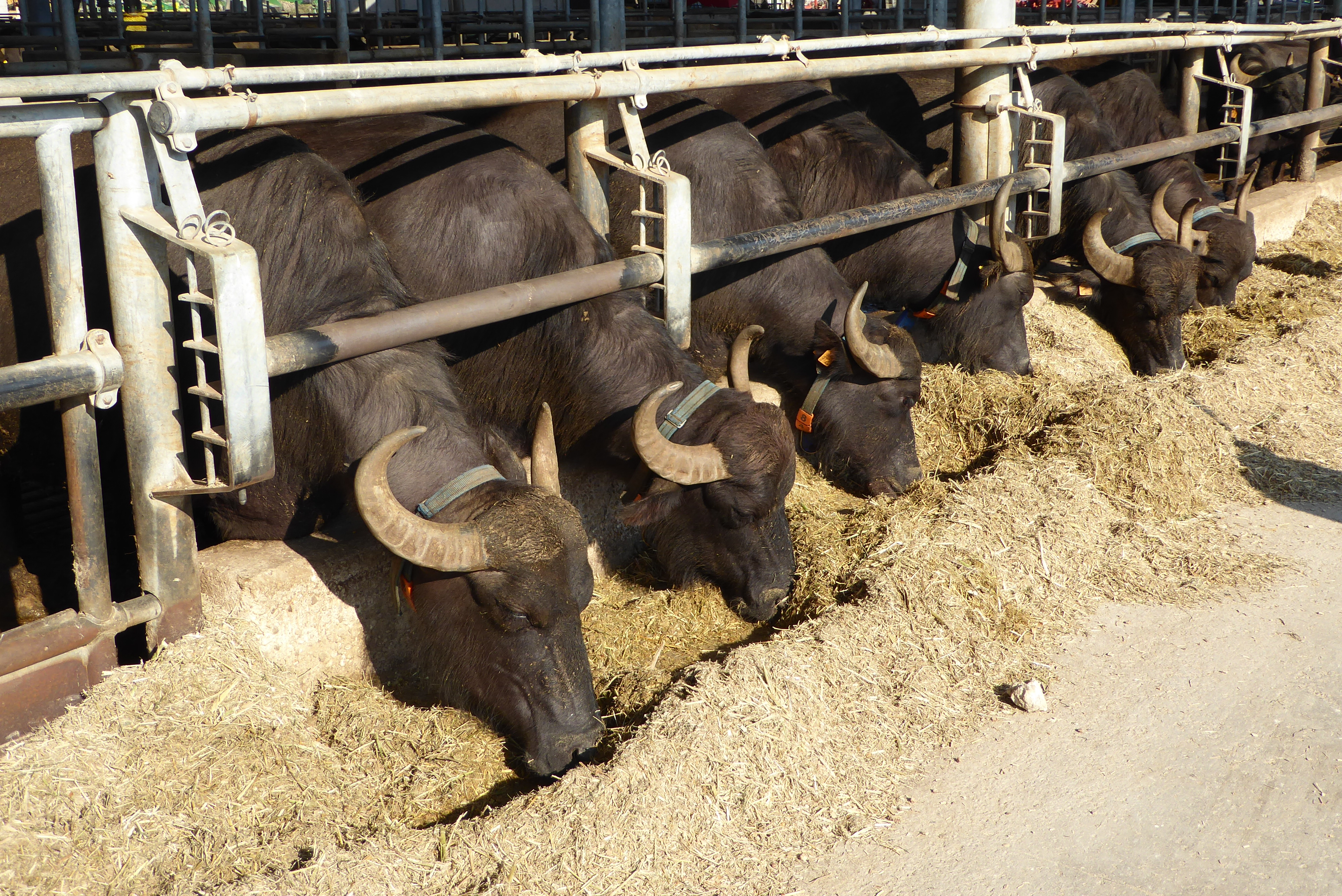
Feeding

In the past the buffalo was widely used as a draught animal. Buffalo also kept waterways and drainage channels clear of weed, swimming in the deeper parts and wading in the shallows.

The Italian Mediterranean buffalo is now raised and selectively bred principally for the production of the buffalo milk used to make buffalo mozzarella, notably the mozzarella di bufala campana of Campania, which has protected designation of origin (PDO) status. Other dairy products including burrata, caciotta di bufala, ricotta di bufala, scamorza di bufala, stracchino di bufala, stracciatella di bufala, and yogurt are also made from the milk. Lactation lasts on average 277 days, and usually yields 1,600–1,800 kilograms (3,500–4,000 lb) of milk; yields of 2,000–3,000 kilograms (4,400–6,600 lb) per lactation are not uncommon, and yields of more than 5,000 kilograms (11,000 lb) have been recorded. In 2012, a total of 192,455,300 kilograms (424,291,300 lb) of buffalo milk was produced in Italy, about 1.7% of total milk production in that year; the fat content was an average of 7.92%.

Some are butchered, either for fresh meat or for preserved meat products such as bresaola di bufalo. In 2012, a total of 118,653 buffalo were slaughtered in Italy, for a total live weight of 47,416,700 kilograms (104,535,900 lb), approximately 2.7% of the total weight of bovines slaughtered that year. The average carcass yield was 50.6%.

In the past, the buffalo were left to forage on poor or marshy ground. In the 21st century, management is invariably intensive: the dairy herd may be stabled or kept in an enclosure close to the milking parlour, and is fed a protein- and energy-rich diet. In 2005, the median herd size was approximately 90; by 2023 it had risen to above 210.

== See also ==
Media related to Italian Mediterranean buffalo at Wikimedia Commons

- Mozzarella
- Buffalo mozzarella
