= Deadshot (bar) =

Defunct bar and restaurant in Portland, Oregon, U.S.

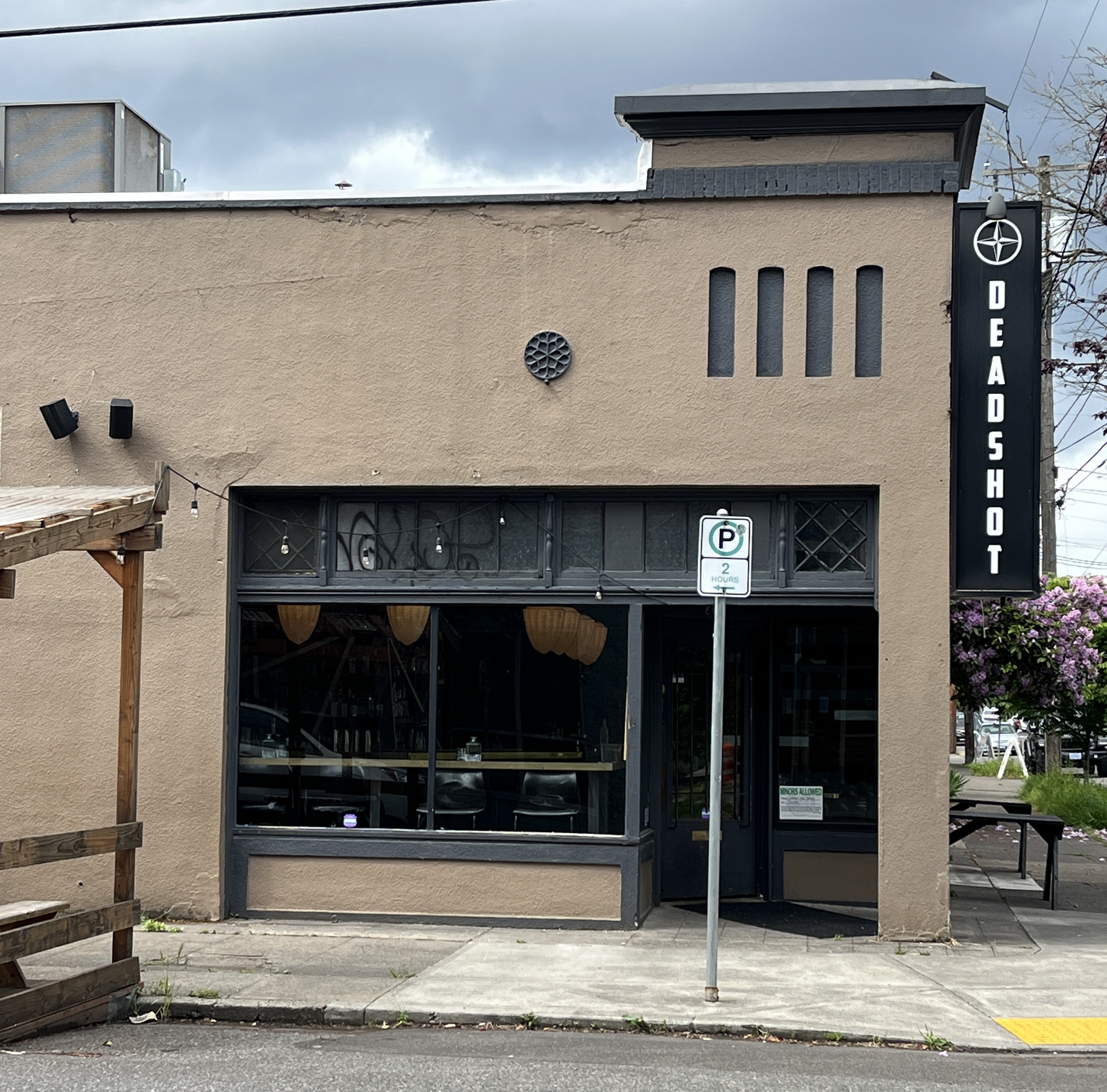
- The bar's exterior in 2025
- Interactive map of Deadshot

Restaurant information
- Closed: November 8, 2025
- Location: 2133 Southeast 11th Avenue, Portland, Multnomah, Oregon, 97214, United States
- Coordinates: 45.5074°N 122.6548°W

Deadshot was a bar in Portland, Oregon, United States. Adam Robinson was a co-owner. The business closed permanently in November 2025.

== Description ==
Deadshot was a bar in Southeast Portland's Hosford-Abernethy neighborhood. Among drinks on the menu were the Who is Jack Nance?, which was a whiskey sour with sherry, sesame, and mustard. Other drinks used bitter melon, cabbage, cantaloupe, and tarragon.

== History ==
Deadshot initially operated on Mondays as a pop-up. Deadshot hosted the Christmas-themed pop-up Miracle.

In September 2025, owner Adam Robinson announced plans to close Deadshot permanently on November 8. He also shared plans to continue Miracle. In January 2026, Rangoon Bistro announced plans to move one of its locations into the space that previously housed Deadshot.

== Reception ==
Alexander Frane included Deadshot in Condé Nast Traveler's 2018 list of Portland's thirteen best bars.

== See also ==
- List of defunct restaurants of the United States
