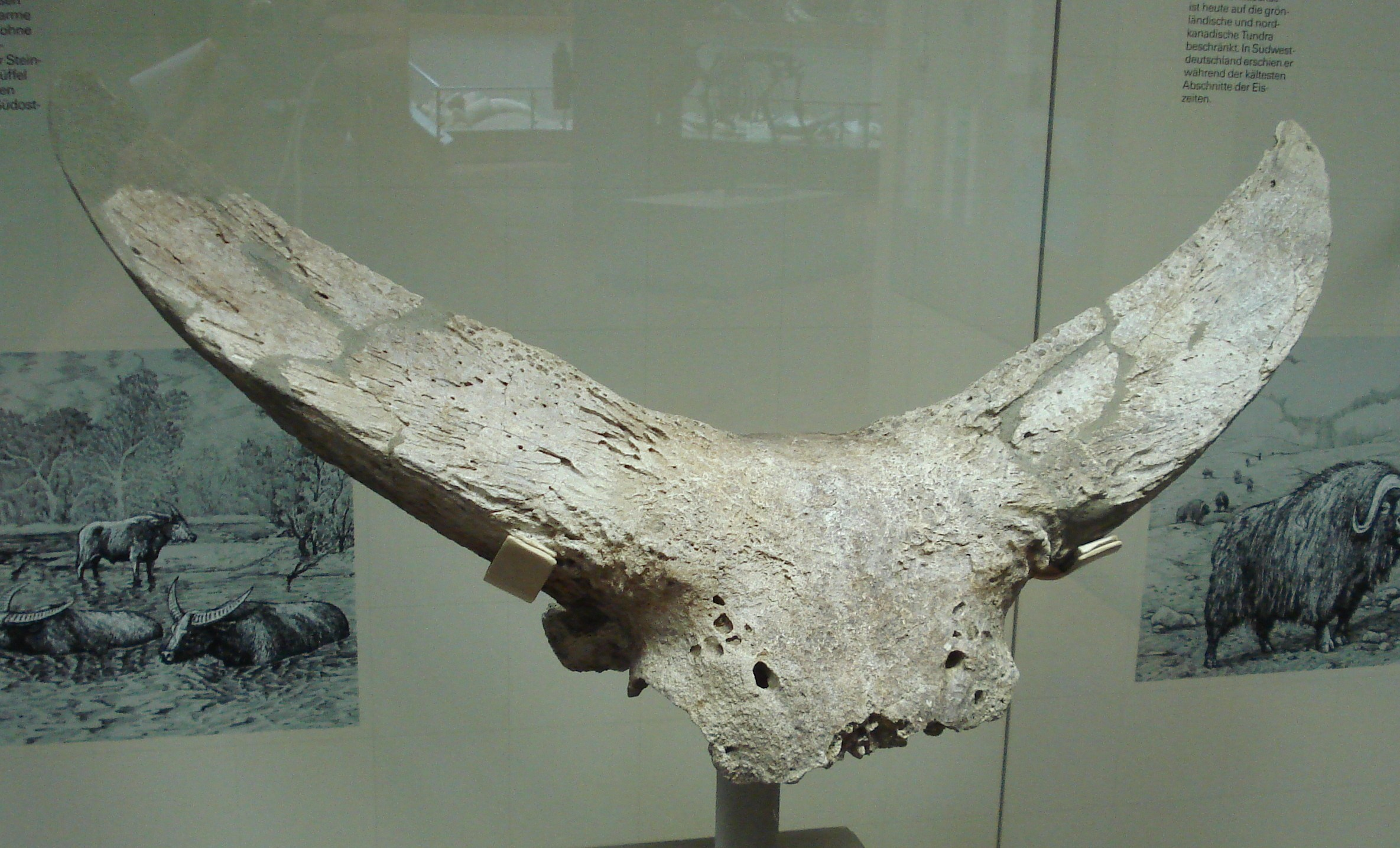

Scientific classification
- Kingdom: Animalia
- Phylum: Chordata
- Class: Mammalia
- Order: Artiodactyla
- Family: Bovidae
- Subfamily: Bovinae
- Genus: Bubalus
- Species: †B. murrensis

Binomial name
- †Bubalus murrensis Berckhemer 1927

= Bubalus murrensis =

Bubalus murrensis Temporal range: Middle Pleistocene-Late Pleistocene 0.4–0.0128 mya

Extinct species of mammal

Bubalus murrensis, also known as European water buffalo, is an extinct species of water buffalo in the genus Bubalus, native to Europe during the Pleistocene epoch, possibly persisting into the Holocene. Like its modern relative, it likely preferred riverine and swampy areas, and the majority of remains have been found close to rivers, including the Rhine, Elbe, and Murr, where it occurred together with other large mammals such as the European elephant (Palaeoxodon antiquus), Merck's rhinoceros (Stephanorhinus kirchbergensis) and aurochs (Bos primigenius). Its presence in Europe is usually linked to warmer interglacial periods, however, an isolated skull from the late Pleistocene of the East European Plain in Russia attests to the species' survival during the Last Ice Age, making a survival into the Holocene — as has been suggested by some — possible.

== Description ==
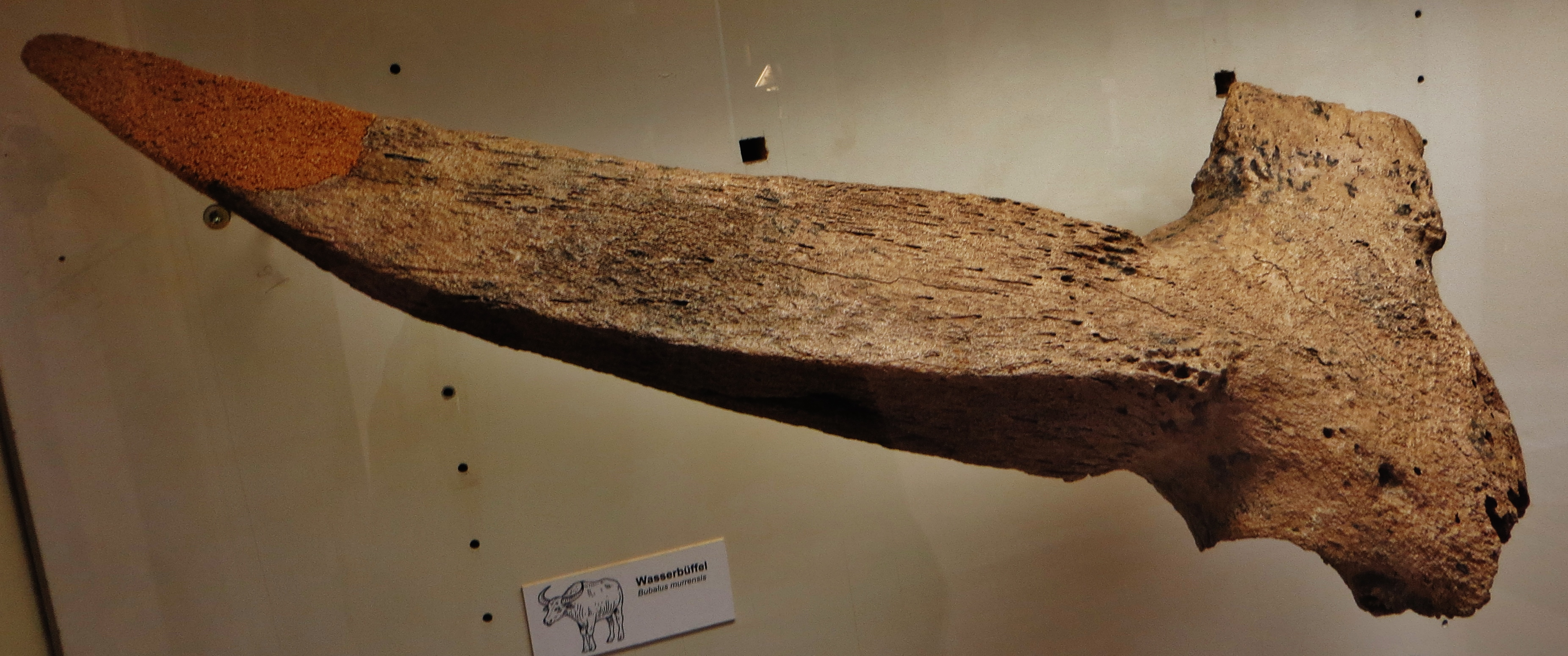
Bubalus murrensis skull in lateral view, showing the flat upper horn surface

Bubalus murrensis is only known from skull and horn remains, as no complete skeletons have been found, and the distinction of postcrania between Bubalus and other, more abundant bovines, including aurochs (Bos primigenius) and the steppe bison (Bison priscus), is difficult. The occipital region of the skull protrudes backwards, which is a shared feature of most Bubalus, but is absent in the recent wild water buffalo (B. arnee) and its ancestor. The horn cores also protrude backwards, and, unlike modern water buffalo but similar to the recent tamaraw (Bubalus mindorensis) and extinct Chinese species of Bubalus (such as Bubalus wansjocki), they have a triangular rather than rounded cross-section, with the upper surface of the horn cores typically forming a flat plain that is continuous with the skull surface. A skull found in Rhineland-Palatinate (Germany) has a width of 107 cm.

== Taxonomy and evolution ==
Bovine fossils that did not conform with the two well-established Pleistocene species at the time — Bos primigenius and Bison priscus — had been recovered since the 19th century, and their affinity with Bubalus had been noted, for example by Ludwig Rütimeyer who, however, did not described a new species. The European water buffalo was then formally described in 1927 by German palaeontologist Fritz Berckhemer, who already introduced it under the name Bubalus murrensis, which has been accepted since. His description was based on a fossil skull from Steinheim an der Murr, Germany, with both horn cores intact and a typical triangular cross-section with a flat upper side. This fossil is dated to the Holstein interglacial (MIS 11, c. 424–374 thousand years ago). Thus, B. murrensis belongs in the same genus as the modern wild water buffalo (B. arnee), the domestic water buffalo (B. bubalis), the tamaraw (B. mindorensis) and the lowland and mountain anoa (B. depressicornis, B. quarlesi).

Following on the description of a very complete skull from the Late Pleistocene of the Russian Plain, Vislobokova and colleagues (2020) argued for the acceptance of two subspecies, differentiated based on differences in size, horn shape, and age.

- Bubalus murrensis subsp. murrensis (Berckhemer, 1927): Middle to Late Pleistocene of Europe
- Bubalus murrensis subsp. extremus (Vislobokova, Tarasenko et Lopatin, 2020): Latest Pleistocene of Eastern Europe

Bubalus murrensis is thought to derive from B. platyceros, which is known from the early Pleistocene (c. 2.6–0.6 Million years ago) of the Upper Sivalik Hills, North India. The oldest Bubalus fossil in Europe is a fragmentary horn from Tsimbala (c. 1.2–0.8 Million years ago) on the Taman Peninsula. The oldest fossils of B. murrensis itself come from central and western Europe, and date to the Holstein interglacial.

== Distribution and habitat ==
While more than 10 fossil species of Bubalus have been described from Asia, B. murrensis is the only species in Europe. Fossils of Bubalus murrensis are known from the late Middle Pleistocene (from around 400,000 years ago) onwards, typically during interglacial periods. During the Pleistocene, cold glacial and warm interglacial periods alternated, meaning that central Europe was periodically inhabited by the cold-adapted mammoth-steppe fauna (including woolly mammoth (Mammuthus primigenius), woolly rhinoceros (Coelodonta antiquitatis) and reindeer (Rangifer tarandus)) and the warm-adapted Palaeoloxodon-fauna (including the straight-tusked elephant, Merck's rhinoceros, the hippopotamus, and fallow deer (Dama dama)). B. murrensis belonged to the second group, as its presence in central Europe is strongly linked to warm interglacials, and it is considered an indicator of warm conditions.

There is uncertainty over whether B. murrensis was present in central Europe only during the interglacials of the middle Pleistocene (the Holstein (MIS 11) and/or the Reinsdorf (MIS 9)), or whether it also occurred there during the Eemian (MIS 5e, c. 130-115 thousand years ago). This uncertainty is due to problems in the dating of the fossil sites and layers B. murrensis was found in. Although these stratigraphic difficulties persist, however, it is now considered more likely that B. murrensis was also present during the Eemian of central Europe, thus most likely colonising the region on at least two separate occasions after glacial periods. It has been suggested that this colonisation took place along the Danube from a hypothetical refugium most likely situated in southern Europe and/or western Asia. On the other hand, the species is thought to have failed to recolonise the Italian Peninsula during the Eemian. The great majority of B. murrensis finds come from along the Rhine, Elbe and Murr in Germany, but fossils have also been unearthed in the Netherlands, France, Italy, Greece, Romania, and Russia.

After the Eemian, B. murrensis is thought to have disappeared from Europe, and the only younger proof of presence is a skull found near Kolomna in Moscow Oblast, Russia, far away from and much younger than all previous B. murrensis finds. This skull has been interpreted as representing a colonisation event into the east European plain, possibly from a refugium in the Caucasus and/or western Asia. It has been dated to the Bølling–Allerød interstadial, a warm phase between the preceding Weichselian glaciation and the succeeding Younger Dryas, which brought a rapid drop in temperature.

The European water buffalo typically occurred in river valleys, but remains are very rare. Like its modern relative, it is thought to have lived in muddy and swampy terrain. B. murrensis is generally considered to have been a thermophilic species, however, there is evidence that it was better adapted to temperate conditions than the recent water buffalo, and could tolerate cold temperatures better. Additionally, it also seems to have become more cold-adapted during its evolution. Its habitat has been reconstructed as forested mixed with open spaces, and there is evidence that landscape openness was particularly high around water bodies during the Eemian. The late Pleistocene individual from Kolomna, in contrast, lived in what is reconstructed as mixed pine-birch forests, suggesting a lesser dependence of late Pleistocene B. murrensis on warm-humid climates. The dental and cranial morphology of B. murrensis suggests that its diet was centred on browse as well as aquatic and riverine vegetation, although it is likely that it also grazed.

== Extinction and potential late survival ==
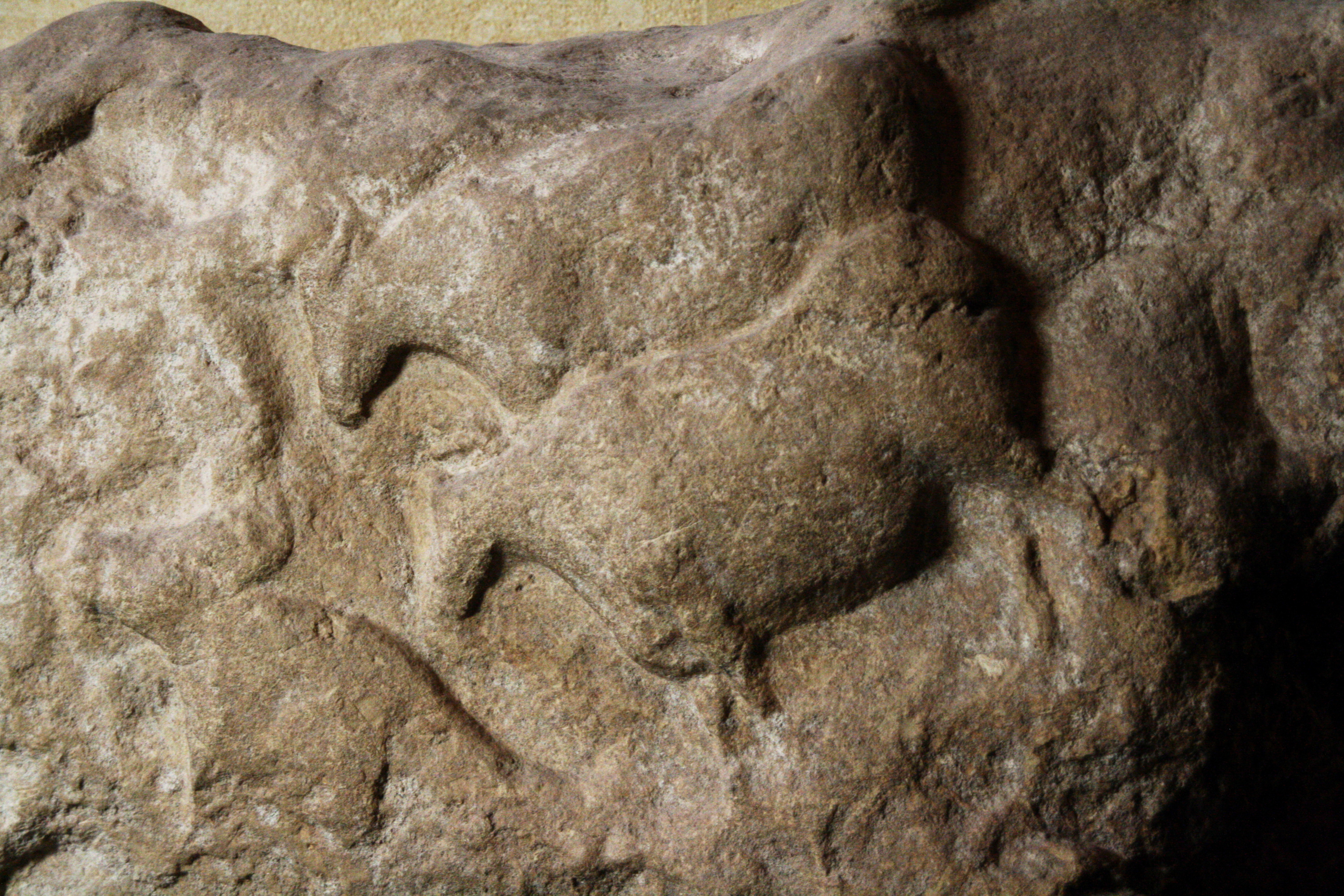
Solutrean rock art from the Fourneau du Diable, Dordogne, France, roughly 16,000 years Before Present. It has been interpreted by some as depicting water buffaloes.

Previously, the latest finds of Bubalus murrensis were dated to the last interglacial (known as MIS 5 or Eemian) of Central Europe, and it was therefore assumed to have become extinct sometime during the subsequent last Ice Age, similar to other representatives of the interglacial Palaeoloxodon fauna (such as the straight-tusked elephant, Merck's rhinoceros, the narrow-nosed rhinoceros (Stephanorhinus hemitoechus) and the hippopotamus). However, due to the general dearth of remains of the species, this assumption was purely speculative. In 2020, a well preserved skull was described from the East European Plain near Kolomna in Moscow Oblast, Russia, attesting to its presence in this region around 12,761 years Before Present. This is over 100,000 years after the next youngest record of the species and moves its suggested date of extinction to the Bølling–Allerød interstadial or younger, around the Pleistocene-Holocene boundary.

Some researchers believe that the species may have also persisted in southern Europe, possibly even into the Neolithic period. A relief from the Fourneau du Diable, Bourdeilles, Dordogne, France, has been interpreted by some authors as a depiction of water buffalo due to the combination of backward-facing horns, a pronounced dewlap and a characteristic dorsal line and dated to around 16,000 years Before Present. Bones tentatively identified as belonging to water buffalo and dated to the earliest Neolithic have been found in the Pannonian basin. However, their identification is uncertain as postcrania of buffalo and cattle, fragmentary ones in particular, are not easily distinguishable and neither horns nor crania have been found.

A 2021 study suggested that traditional European water buffalo breeds such as the Italian Mediterranean buffalo and the Romanian buffalo had unique DNA sequences that could indicate that wild water buffalo from Europe were involved in breed formation, which would also point to late survival. The earliest widely accepted evidence for domestic water buffalo in Europe is during the Middle Ages after 500 AD. The extinction of B. murrensis was probably caused either by the rapid cooling of the Younger Dryas, causing aridification, or by human hunting, or by a combination of both factors.

== See also ==
- Italian Mediterranean buffalo
- Romanian buffalo
