= Malka (restaurant) =

Restaurant in Portland, Oregon, U.S.

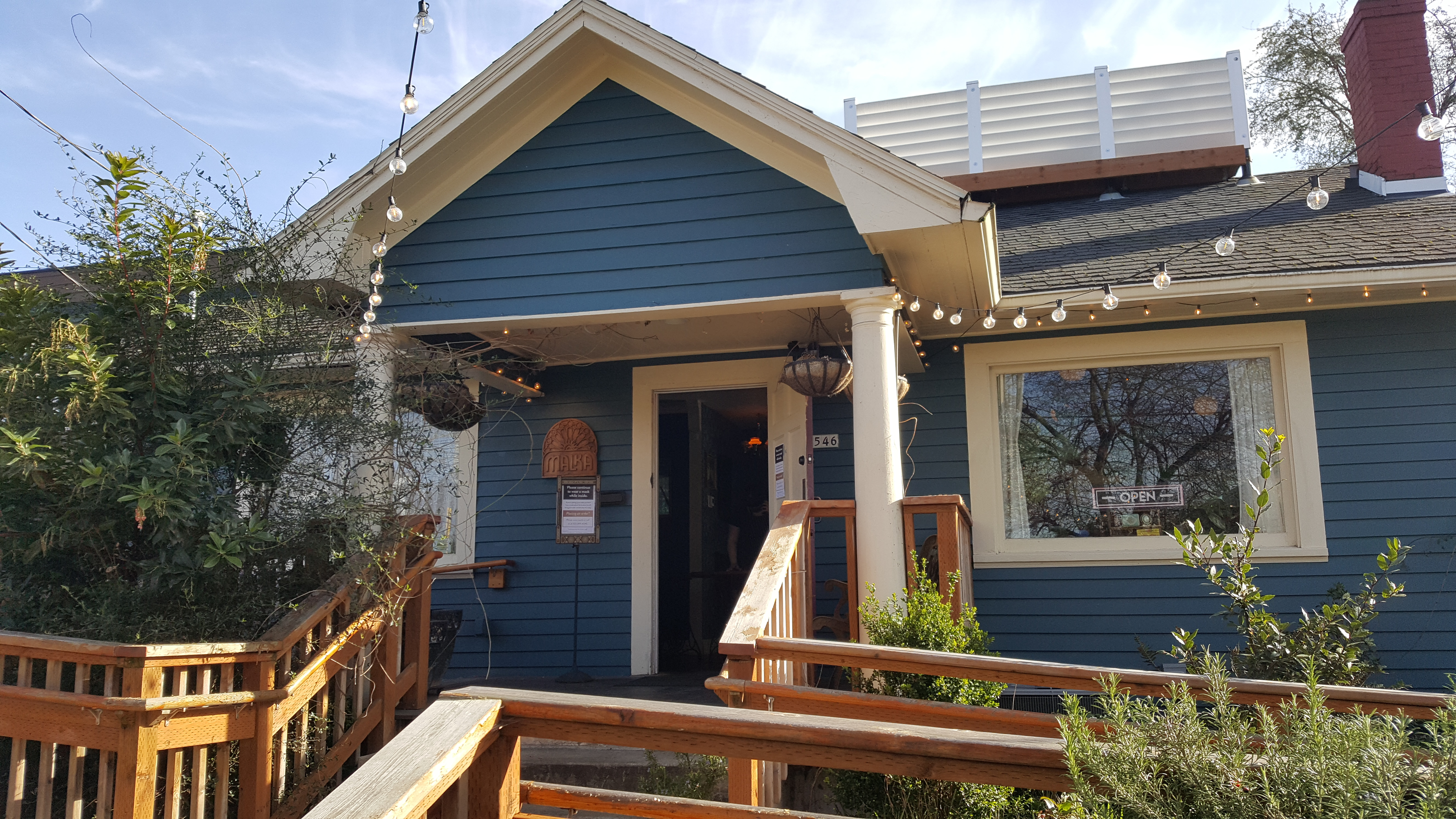
- The restaurant's exterior in March 2022
- Interactive map of Malka

Restaurant information
- Established: January 15, 2020
- Closed: February 26, 2023
- Location: 4546 Southeast Division Street, Portland, Oregon, United States
- Coordinates: 45°30′18.5″N 122°36′54.6″W
- Website: malkapdx.com

Malka was a restaurant in Portland, Oregon.

== Description ==
Malka operated at the intersection of 46th Avenue and Division Street in southeast Portland's Richmond neighborhood. Alex Frane and Brooke Jackson-Glidden of Eater Portland described Malka as "a restaurant specializing in bold, eclectic, and complex dishes from aromatic rice bowls to matzoh ball khao soi gai, housed in a similarly eclectic vintage house". The restaurant served totchos with guajillo-lime salt, red mole, Oaxacan cheese, grated butternut squash, crema, queso fresco, and a lime squeeze.

== History ==
The restaurant opened on January 15, 2020.

In January 2023, owners confirmed plans to close in February. Malka closed on February 26. Turning Peel opened in the space a few months later.

== Reception ==
Willamette Week included Malka in a list of "Five Great New Restaurants That Opened in 2020".
