= Romanian buffalo =

Breed of water buffalo

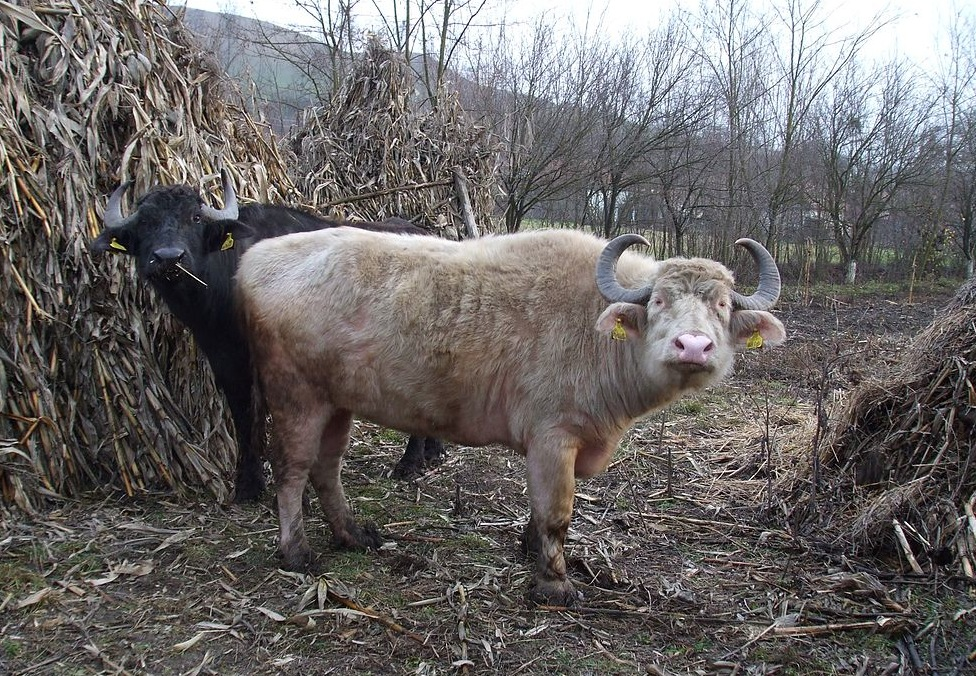
- Other names: Bivol românesc
- Country of origin: Romania
- Type: River
- Use: Draught; dairy; meat

Traits
- Weight: Male: 650–680 kg; Female: 530–560 kg
- Height: Male: 140–142 cm; Female: 131–133 cm
- Coat: Black

The Romanian buffalo, Romanian: "Bivol românesc", is a water buffalo breed from Romania.

== Description ==
The coat colour is unicoloured in black, and the skin colour is also black. Back line is sinuous, i.e. loin and tail point come lower than wither and crump height. Typical number of horns is two for both male and female; the horns are directed to the back, being 50–70 cm long. In adult animals (males/females) the wither heights are 140–142 / 131–133 cm. Live weights of adult animals (males/females) are 650–680 / 530–560 kg.

== Origin and development ==
The Romanian buffalo breed originates from the Mediterranean type of water buffalo. Introgression has been made since 1960 from Murrah buffalo stock from Bulgaria. A herdbook was established in 1987.

The Romanian population consists of three different buffalo types: Carpathian type, Danubian buffalo and one improved through the Indian Murrah buffalo. The most numerous Romanian buffalos are the Carpathian type, which presents a valuable genetic resource, being well adapted to the cold climate.

== Population trend ==
Their number is slightly decreasing. In 1994 the number of breeding female/male used for artificial insemination was 11800 (1,628 in herdbook)/ 5 bulls. In 1996 the number of total buffalo was 209,432, which were raised in 86,480 herds; the number of adult females was 97,320 and the number of adult males 2510. In 2003 the number of females in the herdbook was 275.

== Productive and reproductive traits ==
Main uses are milk, meat and draught power. Milk yield varies according to season of calving, lactations number, level of feeding, and length of lactation. Lactation milk yield (kg) is between 958 and 1455 kg. The number of days lactation per year is 252–285; age at first calving is 38–42 months; average lactations number is 6–9; age at slaughter for young stock is 22–24 and 350–400 kg or at 3–4 months and 60–100 kg for males and the females are slaughtered at 500–600 kg, usually after the first lactation or after the productive life.

In 2003 the female that was included in herd book had 1831 kg milk, with 136 kg fat (7.48%) and 71 kg (3.93%) protein. Age at first calving was 38 months and calving interval of these female was 456 days. The average of calves/year is 0.85.

== Management conditions ==
The breed is very well adapted to the local environment. Type of management is stationary, housing is over 6–8 months / year and feeding is mixes. In most smallholders buffalos are maintained tied in closed barns in winter, while in warm seasons a combination between stable housing with grazing is practiced. The young buffaloes are kept for grazing on pasture. When pastured together, cattle and buffaloes coexist satisfactorily. Romanian buffalos are powerful swimmers.

== Organization monitoring breed ==
1. Ministry of Agriculture, Forests and Rural Development
2. Initiative for the Conservation of rare livestock breeds in Carpathians
