= Mozzarella =

Type of semi-soft Italian cheese

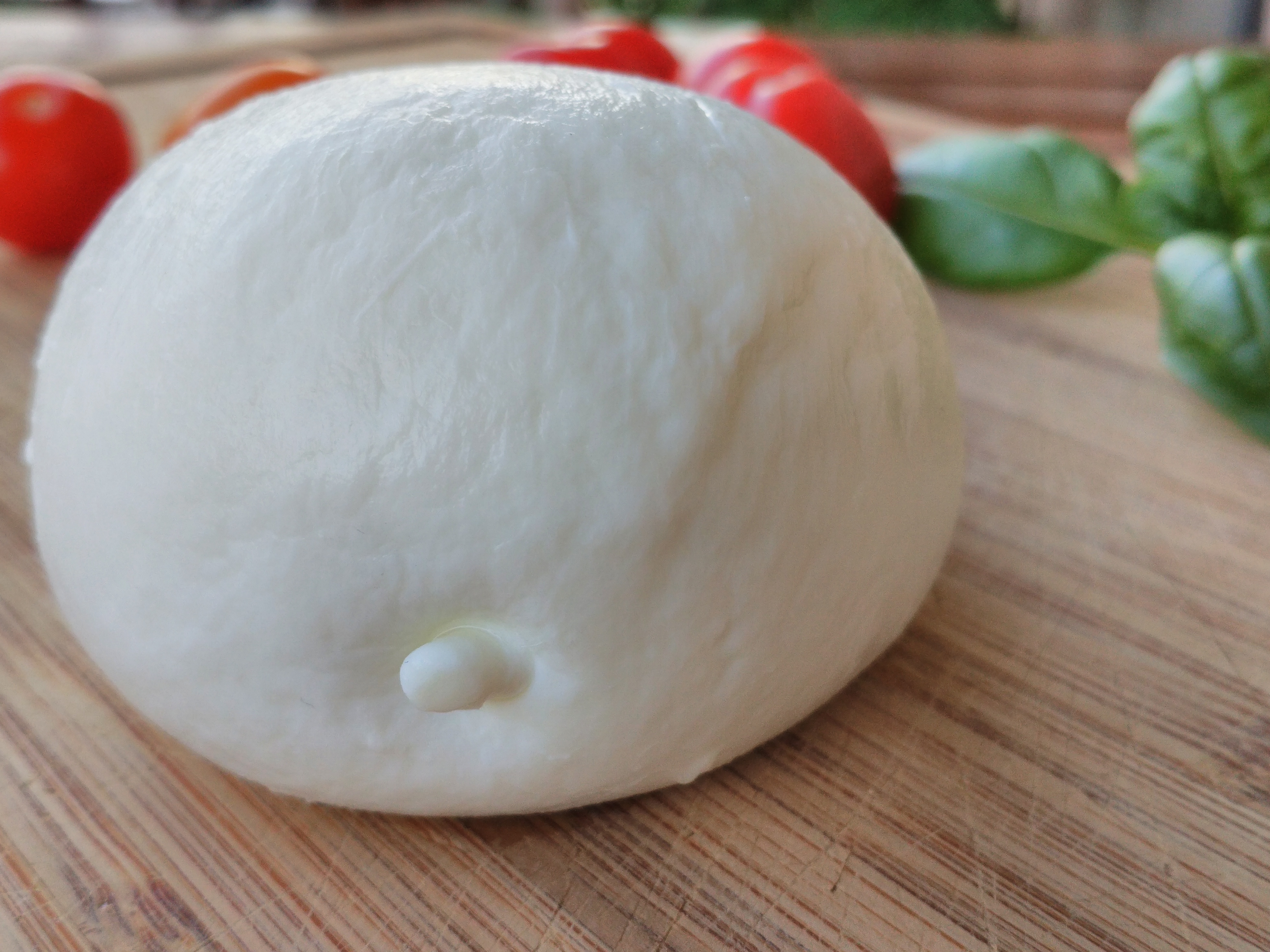
- Buffalo mozzarella
- Country of origin: Italy
- Source of milk: Italian Mediterranean buffalo; cows in all 20 Italian regions; in some areas also sheep and goat
- Pasteurised: Depends on variety
- Texture: Semi-soft
- Fat content: 17 g of fat per 100 g
- Certification: TSG: 1998

Mozzarella (Note: English: /ˌmɒtsəˈrɛlə/ MOT-sə-REL-ə, Italian: [mottsaˈrɛlla]; Neapolitan: muzzarella, pronounced [muttsaˈrɛllə].) (often colloquially shortened to mozza) is a semi-soft non-aged cheese prepared using the pasta filata ('stretched-curd') method. It has a long history in southern Italy, although its precise origins are uncertain.

Varieties of mozzarella are distinguished by the milk used: mozzarella fior di latte when prepared with cow's milk and buffalo mozzarella (mozzarella di bufala in Italian) when the milk of the Italian buffalo is used. Genetic research suggest buffalo came to Italy by migration of river buffalo from India in the 7th century CE.

Fresh mozzarella is generally white but may be light yellow depending on the animal's diet. Fresh mozzarella makes a distinct squeaky sound when chewed or rubbed. Due to its high moisture content, it is traditionally served the day after it is made but can be kept in brine for up to a week or longer when sold in vacuum-sealed packages. Low-moisture mozzarella can be kept refrigerated for up to a month, although some shredded low-moisture mozzarella is sold with a shelf life of up to six months.

Mozzarella is used for most types of pizza and several pasta dishes or served with sliced tomatoes and basil in Caprese salad.

== Etymology ==
Mozzarella is the diminutive form of mozza, 'cut', or derives from mozzare, 'to cut off', referring to the method by which portions of the stretched curd are separated. The term is first mentioned in 1570, cited in a cookbook by Bartolomeo Scappi, reading "milk cream, fresh butter, ricotta cheese, fresh mozzarella and milk". An often-cited 1915 work by Monsignor Alicandri reports a tradition according to which, in the 12th century, the Monastery of San Lorenzo in Capua offered pilgrims bread with mozza. More broadly, pasta filata cheeses have historical roots across the northern Mediterranean, including Italy, Greece, the Balkans and Turkey, while descriptions of soft stretched-curd cheeses in southern Italy date back to antiquity.

== Types ==
Fresh mozzarella has been recognised as a traditional speciality guaranteed (TSG) since 1996 in the European Union. It is usually sold rolled into a ball that weighs around 90 grams (3 oz) and measures about 6 cm (2 1/2 in) in diameter, although they may be as large as 1 kg (2 lb) and have a diameter around 12 cm (4 1/2 in). It is soaked in salt water (brine) or whey when being stored.

In Italy, the cheese is produced nationwide using Italian buffalo's milk under the government's official name mozzarella di latte di bufala, because Italian buffalo are present in all regions. Only selected mozzarella di bufala campana PDO is a style made from the milk of Italian buffalo raised in designated areas of Campania, Lazio, Apulia, and Molise. Unlike other mozzarellas—50% of whose production derives from non-Italian and often semi-coagulated milk—it holds the status of a protected designation of origin (PDO: 1996) under European Union law and UK law.

A denser mozzarella is made by adding citric acid and partly drying (desiccated). This is often used to prepare baked dishes, such as lasagna and pizza.

=== Sizes and shapes ===
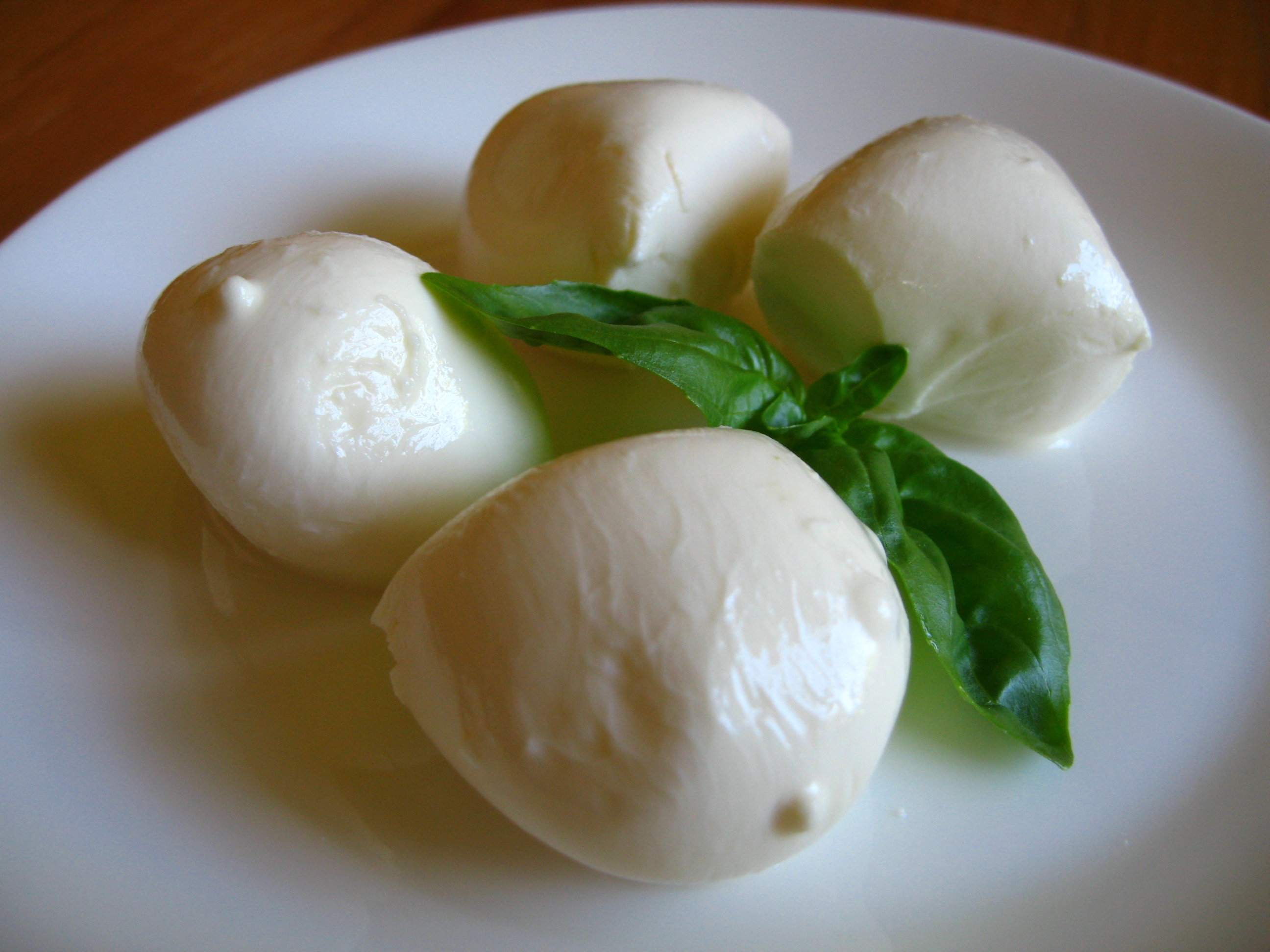
Bocconcini with a sprig of basil

Fresh mozzarella balls are made in multiple sizes for various uses; often the name refers to the size.

Ovolini are about the size of a hen's egg, and may be served whole as part of a composed salad or sliced for topping a small sandwich such as a slider. Ciliegine ('small cherries') are cherry-sized. Perlene are the smallest commercially produced and are often added to salads or hot soups and pasta dishes just before serving. These balls are packaged in whey or water, have a spongy texture, and absorb flavours.

Bocconcini ('small mouthful'), sometimes called uova di bufala ('buffalo eggs'), are approximately bite-sized; a common use is alternating them with cherry tomatoes on a skewer for an appetiser. Bocconcini of water buffalo's milk are still produced in the provinces of Naples, Caserta, and Salerno, as bocconcini alla panna di bufala, in a process that involves mixing freshly produced mozzarella di bufala campana PDO with fresh cream. A bocconcino di bufala campana PDO is also made, which is simply mozzarella di bufala campana PDO, produced in the egg-sized format.

When twisted to form a plait, mozzarella is called treccia.

=== Low-moisture ===
Several variants have been specifically formulated and prepared for use on pizza, such as low-moisture mozzarella cheese. The International Dictionary of Food and Cooking defines this cheese as "a soft spun-curd cheese similar to mozzarella made from cow's milk" that is "[u]sed particularly for pizzas and [that] contains somewhat less water than real mozzarella".

Low-moisture part-skim mozzarella, widely used in the food service industry, has a low galactose content, per some consumers' preference for cheese on pizza to have low or moderate browning. (Note: Galactose is a type of sugar found in dairy products and other foods that is less sweet than glucose. Sugar in foods can lead to caramelization when they are cooked, which increases their browning.) Some pizza cheeses derived from skim mozzarella variants were designed not to require aging or the use of starter. Others can be made through the direct acidification of milk.

=== Other ===
Mozzarella of sheep milk, sometimes called mozzarella pecorella, is typical of Sardinia, Lazio, and Abruzzo, where it is also called mozzapecora. It is worked with the addition of the rennet of lamb. Goat milk mozzarella was invented around 2014, and is produced in small quantities. Mozzarella is also sold smoked (affumicata).

Çaycuma and Kandıra mozzarella cheeses are Turkish cheeses made of buffalo's milk.

== Production ==
Cheese, mozzarella, whole milk
Nutritional value per 100 g (3.5 oz)
- Energy: 300 kcal (1,300 kJ)
- Carbohydrates: 2.2 g
- Sugars: 1 g
- Fat: 22.4 g
- Saturated: 13.2 g
- Monounsaturated: 6.6 g
- Protein: 22.2 g
Vitamins and minerals
Minerals	Quantity %DV^{†}
Calcium	39% 505 mg
Phosphorus	28% 354 mg
Sodium	27% 627 mg
- Other constituents: Quantity
- Water: 50 g
- ^{†}Percentages estimated using US recommendations for adults.

After the curd heals, it is further cut into 1–1.5 cm (3/8–5/8 in) pieces. The curds are stirred and heated to separate the curds from the whey. The whey is then drained from the curds and the curds are placed in a hoop to form a solid mass. The curd mass is left until the pH is at around 5.2–5.5, which is the point when the cheese can be stretched and kneaded to produce a delicate consistency—this process is generally known as pasta filata. According to the mozzarella di bufala campana trade association, "The cheese-maker kneads it with his hands... until he obtains a smooth, shiny paste, a strand of which he pulls out and lops off, forming individual mozzarella."

Large quantities of mozzarella are exported internationally.

== Storage ==
Due to its high moisture content, it is traditionally served the day it is made, and food writer Arthur Schwartz describes that a Neapolitan will not eat day-old mozzarella without further processing—frying or baking into a casserole or pasta. Despite this, manufacturers market the cheese as having a week-long shelf life. As mozzarella is kept, it develops a sour flavour and softens, a process which is slower for larger cheeses.

Within the city of Naples, there is a belief among part of the populace that the best mozzarella is "relaxed", meaning it has softened in the hours after being made. Schwartz reports that this does not seem to be believed by Campanians who live in the country, closer to dairy farms where the cheese is produced, where the cheese can be easily purchased while still firm.

Low-moisture mozzarella can be kept refrigerated for up to a month, although some shredded low-moisture mozzarella is sold with a shelf life of up to six months.

== Recognitions and regulations ==
Mozzarella received a traditional specialities guaranteed (TSG) certification from the European Union in 1998, and in 2022 the product specification was updated for the name mozzarella tradizionale. This protection scheme requires that mozzarella tradizionale sold in the European Union is produced according to a traditional recipe. The TSG certification does not specify the source of the milk, so any type of milk can be used, but it is speculated that it is normally made from whole milk.

Different variants of this dairy product are included in the list of prodotti agroalimentari tradizionali (PAT) of the Ministry of Agricultural, Food and Forestry Policies (MIPAAF), with the following denominations:

- Mozzarella (Basilicata)
- Mozzarella silana (Calabria)
- Mozzarella della mortella (Campania)
- Mozzarella di Brugnato (Liguria)
- Cow's mozzarella (Molise)
- Mozzarella or fior di latte (Apulia)
- Mozzarella (Sicily)

== See also ==
- List of Italian cheeses
- List of stretch-curd cheeses
- List of water buffalo cheeses
- List of smoked foods
