= Central Institute for Research on Buffaloes =

Agricultural research institute in Haryana, India

Central Institute for Research on Buffaloes, Hisar
- Type: Public
- Established: 1 February 1985; 41 years ago
- Affiliations: Ministry of Agriculture & Farmers Welfare, Government of India
- Academic affiliations: ICAR
- Director: Tarun Kumar Bhattacharya
- Academic staff: 158
- Administrative staff: 20
- Postgraduates: 13
- Doctoral students: 8
- Location: Hisar, Haryana, India; 29.1858°N 75.7028°E
- Campus: Hisar (main), Bir Dosanjh (Nabha sub-campus)
- Website: www.cirb.res.in

Central Institute for Research on Buffaloes, Hisar, a publicly funded, institute for water buffalo research. It is located 170 kilometres (110 mi) from Delhi, at Hisar in the north Indian state of Haryana. It has a sub-campus, Bir Dosanjh, at Nabha. CIRB operates a nationwide network of 10 research centres working on breed improvement of the 7 main native breeds. CIRB, with over 20 laboratories for buffalo research, is the world's largest buffalo research institute with the widest range of breeds under study. With the aim of improving breeds and dissemination of information, CIRB has sold over 1,000 bulls, conducted ~200,000 artificial insemination in the field for the farmers' buffaloes with a 41% conception rate, distributed ~520,000 progeny tested frozen semen kits to 45,000 farmers and over 250 institutes, imparted training to several thousand farmers on advanced buffalo husbandry, and created the world's first online Buffalopedia in several languages. It has a large research partner network across India and the globe. It is the second institute to successfully clone a buffalo in 2016, after the first successful cloning was achieved by the National Dairy Research Institute, Karnal in 2010. In July 2017, the Indian Council of Agricultural Research ranked CIRB Hisar as India's number one Buffalo research institute for the year 2016–17.

India has 58% the world's buffaloes and 35% of India's cattle are buffaloes. Buffalo milk is 70% of the total milk yield in India, with its national gross domestic product (GDP) share being larger than wheat and rice combined. Buffalo meat makes up 86% of India's total meat exports, earning INR 26,000 crore (US$4 billion) in 2013–14. CIRB makes high-quality semen available for buffalo breeding at a very low cost to India's farmers. Semen and buffaloes, particularly the Murrah buffalo, are exported to other nations worldwide for the improvement of the breed.

In January 2019, Haryana has 3,600,000 cattle (2,100,00 buffaloes and 1,500,000 cows) and state govt is making efforts to raise the average daily production to 10 liter per milch animal from the existing 6.8 liter, which compares poorly to global best practices such as 15 litres in Australia, 16 litres in New Zealand and 30 litres in Israel. MoU have been signed with Brazil to improve the cattle breed through Embryo transfer technique and another with Israel for milk production through genetic engineering, cattle feed improvement, cold chain and other technologies.

== History ==
It came into existence on 1 February 1985 when the Progeny Testing Bull Farm Hisar, which was earlier part of the Government Livestock Farm, Hisar, was transferred from the Government of Haryana state to the Indian Council of Agricultural Research for research on buffaloes (CIRB). On 11 December 1987, a sub-campus near the Bir Dosanjh Wildlife Sanctuary at Nabha in Patiala District was opened, to undertake research on the Nili-Ravi breed of buffalo found in Punjab. In 2016, it became world's second center to produce a cloned buffalo. The first ever successful cloning of buffalo was done by the National Dairy Research Institute, Karnal in 2010

== Context: Buffalo and dairying ==
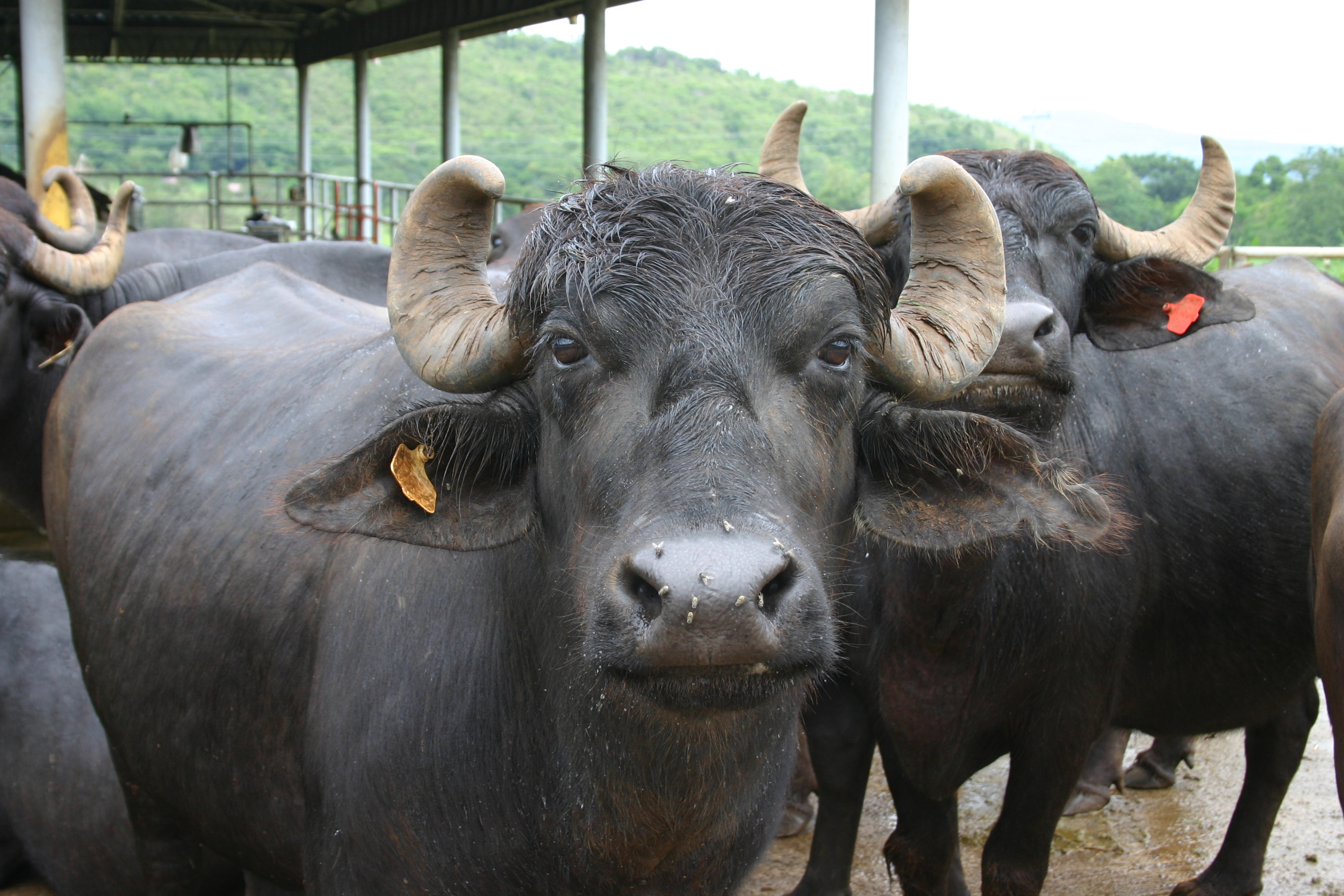
Murrah buffalo (Bubalus bubalis), globally famous local breed of Haryana, were exported to many nations.

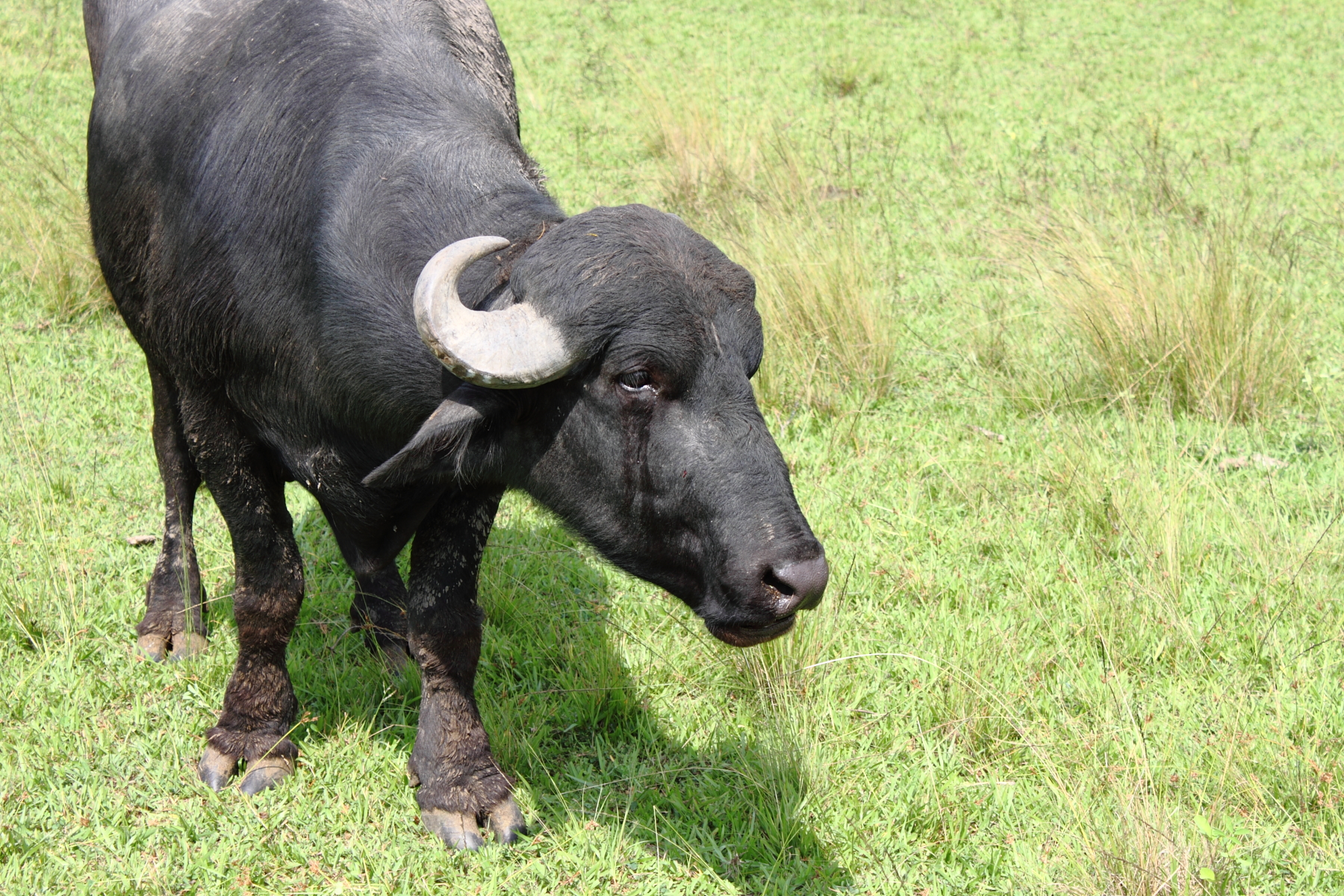
Murrah Buffalo in Brazilian Farm

=== Buffalo population and role in economy ===
As per the Food and Agriculture Organization of the United Nations (FAO), report, the global buffalo population was 148 million in 1992. Asia has 98% of the global buffalo population of nearly 194 million. In 2003, India had 98 million water buffalo (57% of world's buffalo population), followed by 23 million (12% of world's buffalo population) in China, and 3.2 million (1.6% of world's buffalo population) swamp-type carabao in the Philippines. Buffalo play an important part in India's national and rural economy.

=== Milk products ===
The dairy industry market size in Haryana is predicted to grow at 15% CAGR from 2021 to 2026, major players being Vita, Amul, Mother Dairy, Kwality, etc. In 2025, Amul's Sabar Dairy Plant at IMT Rohtak was expanded making it India's largest processing plant for curd, buttermilk, and yoghurt catering for the Haryana, Delhi-NCR, and northern India region. In 2025, Haryana was India's third largest producer of milk (122.2 lakh tonnes per year) with highest per capita milk availability in India (1,105 grams per day).

Rich in zinc, calcium, proteins, magnesium, and vitamin D and B12, milk can be turned into various products such as liquid milk, ghee, curd, paneer, ice-cream, table butter, skimmed milk powder, frozen/flavoured yoghurt, fresh cream, lassi, butter milk, cheese, flavoured milk, UHT milk, dairy whitener, sweet condensed milk, infant food, and malt-based beverages.

=== Breeds at CIRB ===
The main local breeds at CIRB are the Murrah and Nili-Ravi breeds, the former is researched at main campus at Hisar and the later is bred at the Bir Dosanjh sub-station. It also networks with other institutes to undertake research, and collate and disseminate information on the 10 recognised breeds of the Indian river buffalo: Bhadawari, Banni, Jafarabadi, Marathwadi, Mehsana, Murrah, Nagpuri, Nili-Ravi, Pandharpuri, Surti, and Toda and Swamp buffalo found in Assam. Buffalo milk has 58% more calcium, 40% more protein and 43% less cholesterol than cow milk. Buffalo milk is a richer source of phosphorus, vitamin A, protein and contains high levels of natural antioxidants.

== CIRB organisation ==
=== Objectives of CIRB ===
The institute was set up with the following aims:

- Create a core breeding population of important buffalo breeds.
- Conducts comprehensive research on buffalo breeding and production, and transfer technology to the farmers, herders, institutes, NGOs, etc.
- Collate and disseminate comprehensive information on buffalo.

=== Facilities at CIRB ===
Facilities include 20 research laboratories, livestock, frozen semen library, air-conditioned, 125-seat audio-visual seminar hall, guest house with accommodations for 25 guests. The main campus is at Hisar, with a satellite campus at Nabha in Punjab, and two regional stations in Andhra Pradesh and Gujarat respectively.

=== Administrative divisions of CIRB ===
There are 41 scientists, 45 technicians, 71 support and 20 administrative staff conducting research, testing, and training. The divisions are:

1. General Admin
2. Animal Nutrition & Feed Technology
3. Animal Physiology & Reproduction and
4. Animal Genetics & Breeding
5. Transfer of Technology & Entrepreneurship
6. Network Project on Buffalo Improvement
7. Prioritizing, Monitoring and Evaluation (PME) cell
8. Agriculture Knowledge Management Unit (AKMU)
9. Results Framework Documents (AFD) cell
10. ISO Management Committee
11. Agricultural Farm section
12. Animal Farm section
13. Workshop section
14. Estate and Electrical section
15. Internal Security section
16. Landscape section
17. Guesthouse section
18. Library section
19. National Language section
20. Vigilance officer
21. Subcampus section
22. PRO
23. CPIO/APIO

== Extension and dissemination services ==
=== Annual Buffalo festival ===
Hisar Annual Buffalo festival is held every year at the main campus on CIRB foundation day of 1 February, as an extension and awareness day where usually more than 4,000 farmers and breeders attend. Another annual Buffalo mela is held at the Bir Dosanjh subcampus every year on 11 December.

=== Gokul Gram ===
Hisar Gokul Gram, established with the cost of INR 5 crore (INR 50 million), to train milk producers and primary cooperative milk societies.

== See also ==
- List of Universities and Colleges in Hisar
- List of institutions of higher education in Haryana
