= List of water buffalo breeds =

This is a list of domestic water buffalo breeds and their uses.

== Breeds ==
The domestic water buffalo (Bubalus bubalis) is descended from the wild water buffalo (Bubalus arnee), now designated an endangered species. Water buffaloes have been bred, predominantly in Asia, for thousands of years for use by humans. Their main domestic uses are as draught animals and for the production of milk and meat. Two types are recognized, the river-type and the swamp-type. Note: except where otherwise indicated, the reference for all entries is DAD-IS.

Name	Picture	Alternate name	Origin	Use	Notes, references
Al-Ahwar	see § Iranian and Iraqi				§ Iraqi marsh buffalo
Al Jamoose or Jimes	see § Iraqi				
Anatolian buffalo		Turkish: Anadolu Mandası, regional: Camız, Camış, Kömüş, Dombay	Turkey: the Marmara and Black Sea regions, and South Turkey	dairy, draught	of § Mediterranean-type
Assam			NE India		swamp-type
Australian buffalo		Australian swamp buffalo (swamp-type), riverine buffalo (river-type), Australiano (in Venezuela)	Australia's Northern Territory		feral swamp-type buffaloes imported from the eastern Indonesian islands in the 1820s; river-type buffaloes were imported in the 1990s
Azari		Azeri, Azerbaijan, Iranian, Caucasian	Azerbaijan, NW Iran		§ Caucasian buffalo; Iranian Azari (=an ecotype of the § Iranian) comprises 70% of the Iranian buffalo population
Azi Kheli			NW Pakistan: the Swat valley	dairy	light brown or albinoid milking buffalo
Badavan	see § Bhadawari				
Baio		Vermelho	N Brazil: Marajó	dual-purpose (meat and dairy)	swamp-type; color labels separate the swamp-type from typically black (preto) South American river-type breeds; considered a naturalized type or genetic group rather than a breed, categorization similar to § Brazilian Carabao
Baladi (= local or native)			Egypt	dairy	the Nile Delta's milking variety of the § Egyptian buffalo; has longer curved horns, is black or gray in color; varieties of the Baladi type are the § Beheri and the § Minufi buffalo
Balkan	see § European				
Bama kwye	see § Burmese				
Bangladeshi			Bangladesh	dairy, draught	native buffaloes of Bangladesh's floodplains; includes both a black indigenous river-type (western and central areas) and a small gray indigenous swamp-type (eastern areas); see also § Mahish
Bangladeshi, albinoid of the central part of the country			Bangladesh	dairy	a type of the § Bangladeshi, farmed semi-intensively for milk
Bangladeshi, albinoid of the western part of the country			Bangladesh	draught	the smallest (average height 126/121 cm) of the § Bangladeshi buffaloes
Bangladeshi, native buffaloes in the central part			Bangladesh		black indigenous river-type of the § Bangladeshi
Bangladeshi, native buffaloes in the eastern part			Bangladesh		smaller gray indigenous § Bangladeshi swamp-type with white stockings and sometimes white spots on each side of the face; crescent-shaped horns
Bangladeshi, native buffaloes in the southern part			Bangladesh	dairy	larger than native water buffaloes of that area
Bangladeshi, native buffaloes in the western part			Bangladesh		black indigenous river-type of the § Bangladeshi
Banni			W India: the Kachchh (Kutch) region of Gujarat	dairy	developed by the semi-pastoralist Maldhari community
Beheri			Egypt: Beheira Province	dairy	a variety of the § Egyptian buffalo of the § Baladi type; slate-gray or black in color
Belang	see § Tadong				
Bhadawari		Badavan, Etawah	India: Uttar Pradesh and Madhya Pradesh	dairy, draught	selectively improved river-type
Bhainsi	see § Nepalese				
Bhavanegri	see § Jafarabadi				
Binhu			China		a variety of the § Chinese buffalo
Borneo buffalo	see § Kalang				
Brazilian		Kalabaw, Kalaban; Portuguese: bufalo de pantano (= swamp-type breeds); Portuguese: preto (= typically black river-type breeds)	Brazil		swamp-type breeds descended from stock originating from French Indochina, including the black Philippine Carabao; initially imported in about 1890 to Marajó Island (most are still found there today); see §§ Brazilian Carabao, Rosilho, and Baio; river-type breeds from India, Italy and Egypt were imported in the early to mid-20th century; there are three river-type breeds recognized: the § Jafarabadi; the § Mediterranean; the § Murrah
Brazilian Carabao		Kalaban	Brazil	meat and draught swamp-type	has its own herdbook in Brazil, described as a naturalized genetic group rather than a breed; there is a variety called the § Rosilho
Búfalo de Pantano			Cuba		see § Australian buffalo
Búfalo de Rio			Cuba		see § Buffalypso
Buffalypso		Trinidadian buffalo (sometimes called Trinidadian bison or hog cattle)	Trinidad and Tobago	specialized for meat and haulage	derives from crosses between the swamp-type § Carabao and river-type breeds (such as the § Murrah, the § Nili-Ravi, the § Jafarabadi, the § Surti, § Nagpuri, and the § Bhadawari); has a refined head, prominent eyes, small flat compact horns growing back, up and in, short in the leg, low compact body, meaty hindquarters, straight topline; typically Buffalypso are red or fawn, colors include black, brown, albinoid; exported to 19 countries (the U.S. and several Latin American countries)
Bulgarian buffalo			Bulgaria	meat, dairy, work	a regional variety of the typical European, i.e. the § Mediterranean; traditionally of strong, muscular working type, became triple-purpose animals; the indigenous Bulgarian bison is now extinct
Bulgarian Murrah		Bulgarian: Българска мyрра, Bulgarska murra	Bulgaria	dairy	derives from crosses of Mediterranean buffaloes with Indian Murrah (and Surti) buffaloes imported from 1962; is black, black/brown or dark gray, has large black eyes, coiled horns, a wide rump, long tail, voluminous belly, deep broad chest, a short wide back often slightly dipped, well-developed udder suited to machine milking; is now rare in its homeland; exported to Romania and South America
Burmese		Burma (Myanmar); locally: Bama Kwye and Pa Sauk Kwye (kwye or kywe = buffalo)	Myanmar		swamp-type; varies locally in size, color and horn shape; the larger § Shan Kwye is classified as a distinct "breed"; the Burmese wild buffalo is a feral gayal (or mithun)
Burmese wild buffalo		Burmese: pyaung, pyun also referred to as: the Burmese gaur (either Bos gaurus readai or Bos gaurus laosiensis); the Burmese bison	Myanmar		the wild buffaloes of Burma are a gaur subspecies (either Bos gaurus readai or B. g. laosiensis) that were reputedly domesticated animals (gayal or mithun) that became feral in swampy bush areas; hunted and recaptured and kept by some farmers in hilly northern jungles for producing meat and good leather
Cambodian buffalo			Cambodia		two varieties: the krabei beng; the moi (or § Mountain buffalo); the krabei leu (or krabei sre)
Carabao			the Philippines	meat, dairy, draught	swamp-type
Caucasian			Georgia, the Russian Federation	meat, dairy	
Chilika			India		river-type; saline-tolerant, well-adapted to Orissa's vast brackish lagoon at the mouth of the Daya River
Chinese buffalo			China		many varieties: the §§ Haizi and Mountainous buffaloes, the § Shanghai (incl. the Jiangsu Round-Barrel), and the §§ Dongliu, Wenzhou, Fu'an, Xiajiang, Xinfeng Mountainous, Xinlong, Fuzhong, Binhu, Enshi Mountainous, Jianghan, Xingyang, Shannan, Fuling, Yanjin, Dehong, Southeastern Yunnan, Guizhou, and Guizhou White buffaloes, introduced to Hong Kong
De			Vietnam		
Dechang			China		
Dehong			China		a variety of the § Chinese buffalo
Domaci bivo			Serbia		
Dongliu			China		a variety of the § Chinese buffalo
Egyptian		Masri	Egypt	dairy, draught	river-type; can be loosely divided, both geographically and by type, into two types: the long-horned local buffaloes of the Nile Delta: the milking § Baladi, incl. the § Beheri (slate-gray to black in color) and the § Minufi (dark gray); the short-horned buffaloes of Upper (southern) Egypt: the § Saidi; primarily a draught animal
Enshi Mountainous			China		a variety of the § Chinese buffalo
Fu'an			China		a variety of the § Chinese buffalo
Fuling			China		a variety of the § Chinese buffalo
Fuzhong			China		a variety of the § Chinese buffalo
Gaddi			Nepal		
Georgian buffalo			Georgia, the Russian Federation		
Ghab			Syria		
Gilani		Mazandarani, Shomali	Iran		a minor northern ecotype of the § Iranian, see § Caucasian
Godavari			India		
Greek buffalo			Greece		
Guizhou			China		
Guizhou White			China		
Haizi			China		
Iranian and Iraqi			Iran and Iraq	dairy	mainly river-types
Iranian	see § Iranian and Iraqi				the Iranian buffaloes by ecotype: the Mazandarani, § Gilani or Shomali (a minor northern ecotype, see § Caucasian); the § Azari (70% of the Iranian buffalo population); the § Khuzestani or Khoozestani (an ecotype of the southern marshes)
Indonesian wild buffalo		Indonesian water buffalo, Indonesian swamp buffalo, Indonesian buffalo	Indonesia		a feral water buffalo breed, introduced to Komodo and Flores
Iranian Azari ecotype	see § Azari				an ecotype of the § Iranian
Iraqi		Al Jamoose, Jimes = water buffalo other: Dwab (Dauab), Granish	Iraq	meat, dairy, ridden work animal	Iraqi buffaloes are divided by habitat into "marsh" and "city", or into the § Al Ahwar marsh buffalo and the larger and milkier river-type of urban areas with considerable diversity in color
Italian		Italian: Bufala Mediterranea Italiana, Italian Mediterranean, Mediterranean Italian, Italiano (in Venezuela)	Italy	dairy	of § Mediterranean-type (riverine); Italian Mediterranean buffaloes have been exported to Brazil and other parts of Latin America
Jafarabadi			India	dairy	
Jaffrabadi			Gujarat	dairy	
Jerangi			India		
Jianghan			China		a variety of the § Chinese buffalo
Kalaban			Brazil		
Kalahandi			India		
Kalang		Borneo buffalo (in English), Kerbau Rawa (in Indonesian)	Indonesia: (Kalimantan)		
Kebo			Indonesia		
Kerbau-Gunung			Indonesia		
Kerbau-Indonesia			Indonesia		
Kerbau Moa			Indonesia		
Kerbau-Murrah			Indonesia		
Kerbau-Sumatra-Barat			Indonesia		
Kerbau-Sumatra-Utara			Indonesia		
Kerbau-Sumbawa			Indonesia		
Khoozestani		Khuzestani	Iran		an § Iranian ecotype of the southern marshes
Kundi		Kundhi, Sindhi Murrah	E Pakistan: N Sindh	dairy	river-type; some consider it a regional variety of the § Murrah
Lanka			Sri Lanka		
Lime			Nepal		
Mahish			Bangladesh		a variety of the § Bangladeshi, crossed with the indigenous swamp-type, river-type dominant
Malaysian		kerbau	Malaysia		three varieties: the kerbau § Sapi Tenusu; the kerbau § Sawah; the § Selembu
Manda			India		
Mannar			Sri Lanka		
Marathwada			India		
Masri	see § Egyptian				
Mediterranean			the Mediterranean region		
Mehsana			India	dairy	
Mestizo			the Philippines		
Minufi		Minufi, Menoufi or Monoufi	Egypt: the southern and central parts of the Nile Delta	dairy	a variety of the § Egyptian buffalo of § Baladi type; dark gray in color
Monouli			Egypt		
Mountain buffalo		moi	Cambodia		a variety of the krabei beng § Cambodian buffalo
Mountainous			China		a variety of the § Chinese buffalo
Munding			Indonesia		
Murrah			India, Pakistan	dairy	also found in Azerbaijan, Brazil, China, Ecuador, Guatemala, Laos, Malaysia, Nepal, Philippines, Sri Lanka, Vietnam
Myanmar swamp buffalo	see § Burmese				
Nagpuri		Berar, Durna-Thalia, Ellichpuri, Gaulani, Gauli, Marathwada, Varadi	W India: Maharashtra	dairy, draught	two varieties: the Purnathadi; the § Pandharpuri
Nelore			Argentina		
Nepalese hill buffalo			Nepal		
Nepalese mountain buffalo			Nepal		
Ngo			Vietnam		
Nili			E Pakistan, N India		see § NiliRavi
Nili-Ravi		Panch Kalyani	E Pakistan, N India	dairy	a combination of two fairly similar Pakistani water buffalo breeds, the Nili and the Ravi; formerly described as geographically isolated varieties of the § Murrah exported to Bangladesh, China, the Philippines, Sri Lanka, Brazil and Venezuela
Pa Sauk	see § Burmese				
Pahadi	see § Nepalese				
Palitana	see § Jafarabadi				
Pampangan	see § Indonesian				
Panch Kalyani	see § Nili-Ravi				
Pandharpuri		Dharwari (in Mysore)	India	dairy	see § Nagpuri
Papua New Guinea buffalo			Papua New Guinea		
Parkote	see § Nepalese				
Parlakimedi	see § Manda				
Peddakimedi	see § Kalahandi				
Philippine	see § Carabao				
Plain buffalo			Cambodia		
Purnathadi	see § Nagpuri				
Purvi	see § Nepalese				
Ravi		Sandal Bar	E Pakistan, N India		see § Nili-Ravi
Rawa	see § Kalang				
Romanian buffalo			Romania	meat, dairy, draught	
Rosilho			Brazil		a variety of the § Brazilian Carabao
Siamese buffalo		Thai water buffalo, Thai swamp buffalo (in English), Kwai Thai, Karbue (in Thailand),	Thailand	meat, dairy, draught	swamp-type
Saidi			Egypt		
Sambalpur			India		
Sapi Tenusu		kerbau Sapi Tenusu	Malaysia	dairy	a variety of the § Malaysian; river-type
Sawah		kerbau Sawah;	Malaysia		a variety of the § Malaysian; swamp-type
Shanghai			China		a variety of the § Chinese buffalo
Shan Kywe		swamp-type of the elevated Shan Plateau in eastern-central Burma	Myanmar		larger, heavier and darker in color than other § Burmese buffaloes; classified as a distinct "breed"
Shannan			China		a variety of the § Chinese buffalo
Southeast Yunnan			China		a variety of the § Chinese buffalo
South Kanara			India		
Surti			India, Sri Lanka	dairy, draught	
Taiwan buffalo			Taiwan		
Tamankaduwa			Sri Lanka		
Tamarao			the Philippines		
Tarai buffalo			India, Nepal		
Tedong			Indonesia		
Tipo Baio			Brazil		
Toda			India		
Toraya			Indonesia	meat, dairy, draught	
Trâu Nội			Vietnam		
Trinitario			Venezuela		see § Buffalypso
Wenzhou			China		a variety of the § Chinese buffalo
Xiajiang			China		a variety of the § Chinese buffalo
Xilin			China		a variety of the § Chinese buffalo of the Guangxi Zhuang Autonomous Region
Xinfeng Mountainous			China		a variety of the § Chinese buffalo
Xinglong			China		a variety of the § Chinese buffalo
Xingyang			China		a variety of the § Chinese buffalo
Yanjin			China		a variety of the § Chinese buffalo
Yibin			China		a variety of the § Chinese buffalo

== See also ==
- List of cattle breeds
