= Buffalypso =

Breed of water buffalo

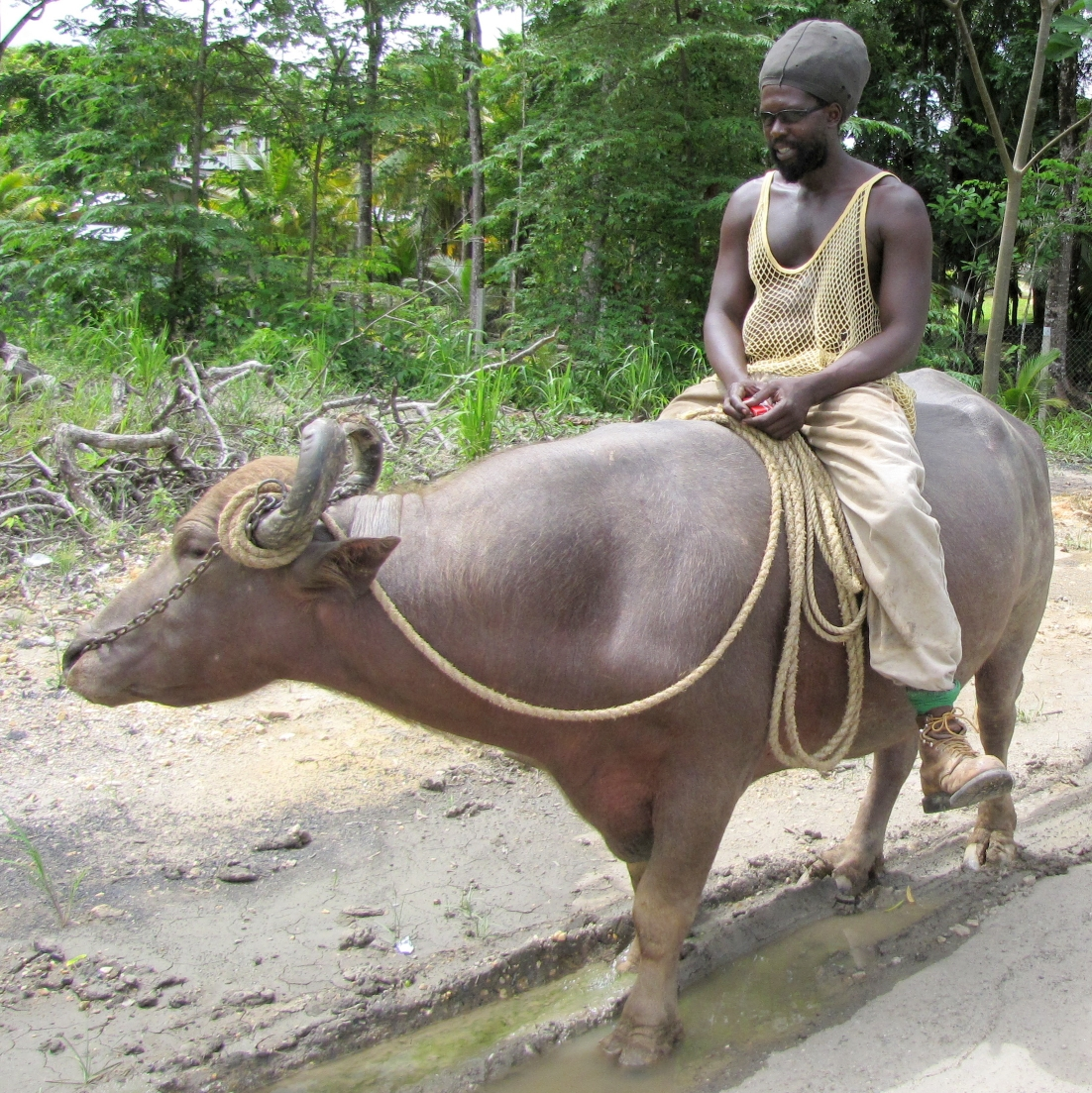
A Trinidadian buffalo used as a transport mount.

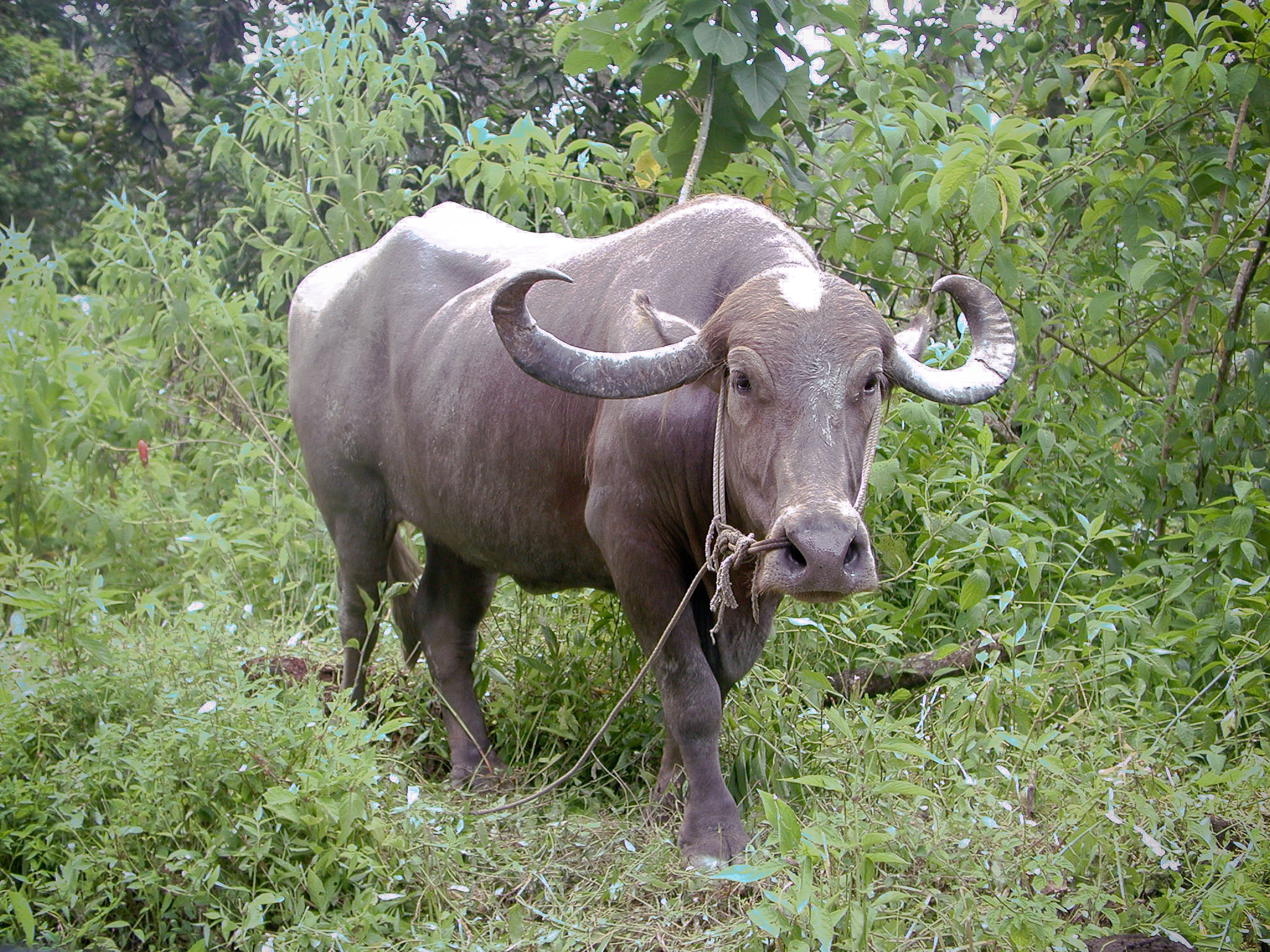
A Buffalypso steer

Buffalypso, also called Trinidadian Buffalo, is a breed of water buffalo (Bubalus bubalis) developed in Trinidad by veterinarian Stephen Bennett (1922–2011) in the early 1960s. The buffalypso is the result of breeding programs that crossed the swamp-type carabao with river-type buffaloes like the Murrah buffalo, the Surti buffalo, the Jaffarabadi buffalo, the Nili-Ravi, and the Bhadawari.

== History ==
In 1948, after completing his veterinary studies at the Ontario Veterinary College (University of Guelph), Bennett returned to his native Trinidad to work, among other places, on the estates of Caroni Limited Sugar Company. There, he recognized the potential of water buffaloes whose draft power had been used in sugarcane cultivation. Using selective breeding methods on some of the hardiest animals of the swamp-type carabao and river-type buffaloes like the Murrah buffalo, the Surti buffalo, the Jaffarabadi buffalo, the Nili-Ravi, and the Bhadawari, he created a breed that could serve both milk and meat production, while presenting increased resistance to infection with tuberculosis (Mycobacterium bovis) compared to their forebears. The name "Buffalypso" was chosen as a combination of "buffalo" with the style of music, calypso that originated in Trinidad and Tobago.

Indian water buffaloes were imported to Trinidad from India, from the early 20th–century through 1949. Besides serving as draft animals, they produced dairy products such as ghee, which were valued by workers of East Indian heritage. Feed for the buffaloes, with their good ability to digest fibrous plant materials, was economically supplied by refuse cane from sugar production.

By the early 2000s, the promise of the hardy, dual-purpose buffalo breed developed by Bennett was dwindling. In 2018, a conference at University of the West Indies took up the question of how it could be rehabilitated, amidst state neglect of disease testing and diminished vigilance over breeding. Whatever comes of these efforts, the Buffalypso have established posterity elsewhere in the Western hemisphere, having been exported to South American countries such as Argentina, Brazil, and Venezuela, Costa Rica, and even North America.
