= Carabao =

Philippine water buffalo

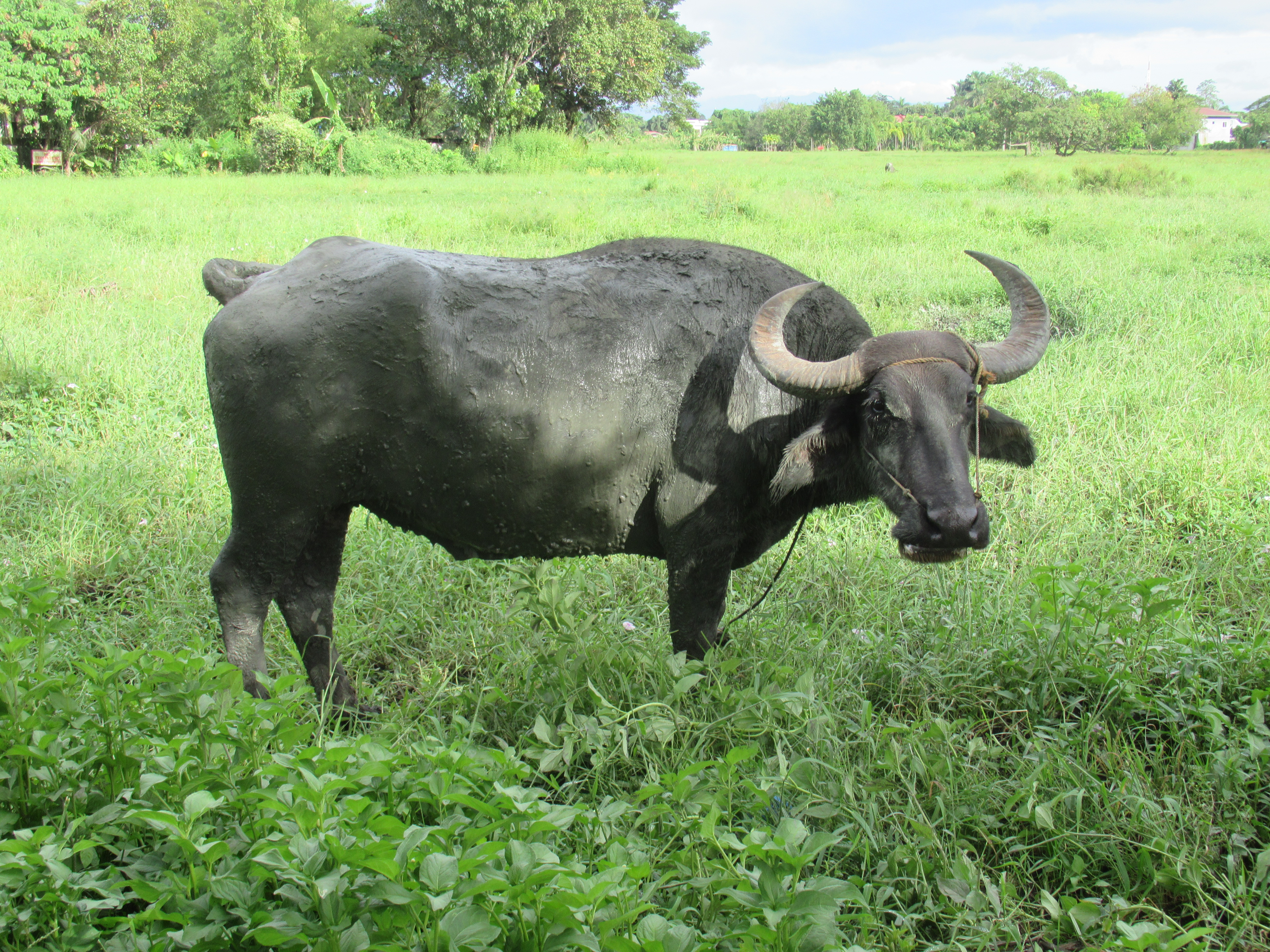
- A carabao in the Philippines
- Country of origin: Philippines
- Distribution: Philippines, Borneo, Sulawesi, Guam
- Type: Swamp
- Use: draft animal, transport, milk, hide, meat

Traits
- Height: Male: 127–137 cm; Female: 124–129 cm
- Coat: light grey to slate-grey

Carabaos (Filipino: kalabáw) are a genetically distinct population of swamp-type water buffaloes (Bubalus bubalis kerabau) from the Philippines. They were also further introduced to Sulawesi and Borneo of eastern Indonesia and Malaysia.

Carabaos are the traditional draft animals in the Philippines for paddy field rice cultivation and are commonly raised by smallholder farmers. They were also formerly widely used for the transport of goods throughout the islands. They are a source of carabao milk and carabeef, among other products. The carabao is widely considered to be the national animal of the Philippines and symbolizes hard work.

Carabaos were introduced to Guam from the Philippines in the 17th century. They have also acquired great cultural significance to the Chamorro people and are considered the unofficial national animal of Guam.

The term "carabao" is also sometimes used for the kerbau in Malaysia, which is the official animal of the state of Negeri Sembilan. However, water buffaloes from Peninsular Malaysia and western Indonesia (Java and Sumatra) are not carabaos and descend from different populations that were introduced through a later separate route from Mainland Southeast Asia rather than through Taiwan.

== Names and etymology ==
The English term "carabao" is borrowed from the Spanish word carabao, which is derived from Eastern Visayan (likely Waray) karabàw. The female is called (in Spanish) a caraballa. Cognates include Cebuano kábaw, Tagalog kalabáw, Kavalan qabaw, Minangkabau kabau, Malay kerbau, Javanese kebo, and Indonesian Dutch karbouw. These Austronesian terms appear to be loanwords from the Austroasiatic languages and likely derive from a secondary pre-colonial introduction of water buffaloes into Island Southeast Asia via western Indonesia.

However, it is also clear that Austronesians already had ancient terms for the carabao, reconstructed as Proto-Austronesian *qaNuaŋ. Cognates include Papora loan, Thao qnuwan, Siraya luang, Rukai nwange, Ilocano nuang, Tagalog anwang or anowang, Kankanaey nuang, Isneg nuang, Itawis nwang, Bontoc nuwang, Ifugao nuwang, and Aklanon anwang. Cognates survive into Sulawesi, but the terms there apply to the related anoa. Similarly, Hanunó'o anwang also refers to the tamaraw of Mindoro, rather than the carabao. These terms spread southwards from Taiwan, indicating that domesticated carabaos were carried partially into the Philippines during the Austronesian expansion, but didn't move further south into the rest of Island Southeast Asia until the second introduction from Mainland Southeast Asia. The reason for this is unknown.

Other native names for carabaos include damulag in Tagalog, Bikol, and Kapampangan; dueg in Pangasinan; and pagad in Ivatan. The resemblance of the word "carabao" to caribou is coincidental, and they do not share a common etymology — an example of a false cognate.

== History ==
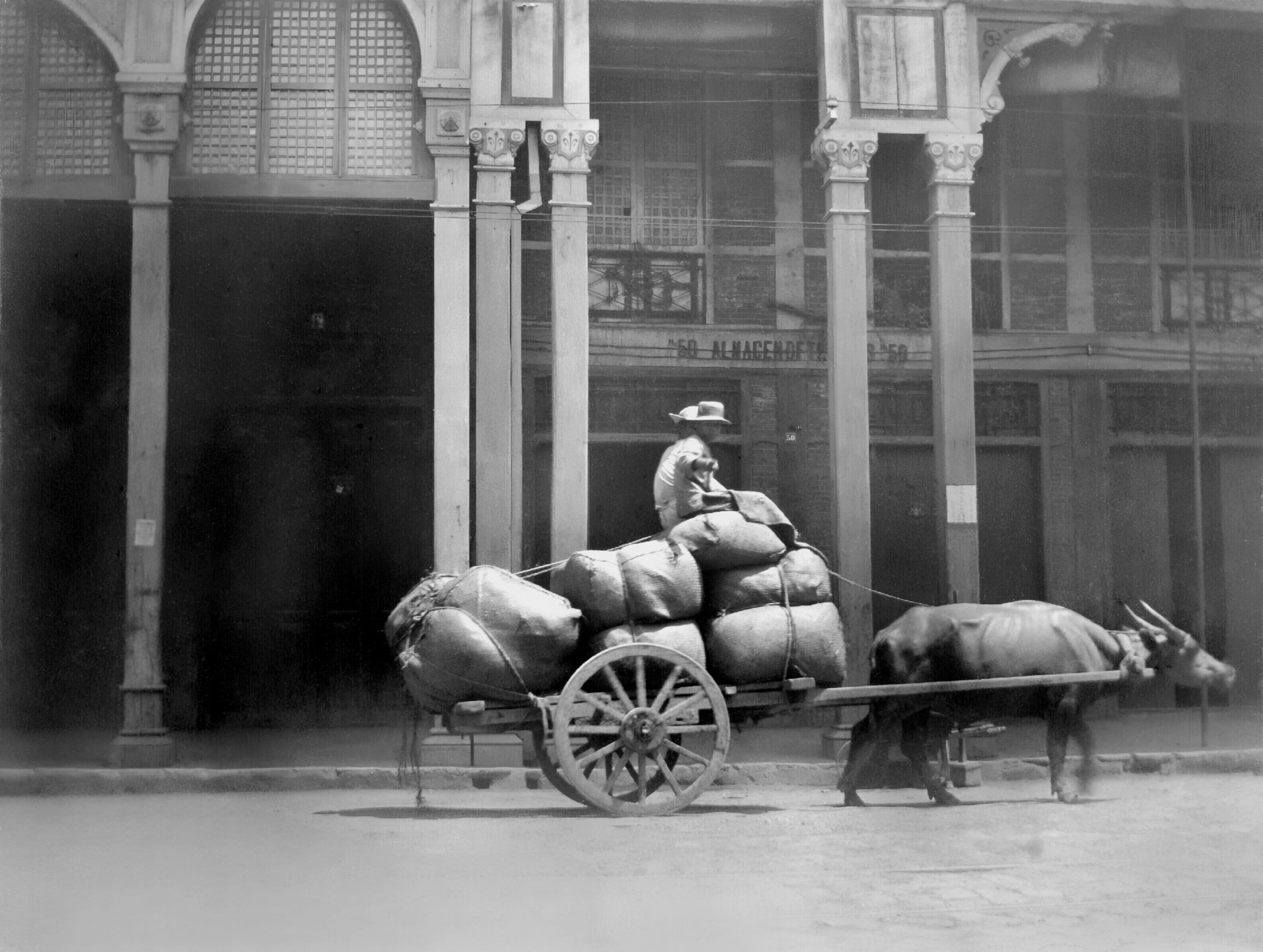
Carabaos used for heavy transport in Manila, Philippines 1900's

The oldest evidence of water buffalo discovered in the Philippines is multiple fragmentary skeletal remains recovered from the upper layers of the Neolithic Nagsabaran site, part of the Lal-lo and Gattaran Shell Middens (~2200 BCE to 400 CE) of northern Luzon. Most of the remains consisted of skull fragments, almost all of which have cut marks indicating they were butchered. The remains are associated with red slipped pottery, spindle whorls, stone adzes, and jade bracelets; which have strong affinities to similar artifacts from Neolithic Austronesian archeological sites in Taiwan. Based on the radiocarbon date of the layer in which the oldest fragments were found, water buffalo were already present in the Philippines by at least 500 BCE.

Genetic studies have shown that the closest related populations to carabaos are the swamp buffalo populations of Taiwan, which in turn descended from swamp buffaloes from the Neolithic rice-farming cultures of the Yangtze Delta. This indicates that carabaos were carried along by the Austronesian migrations into the Philippines from Taiwan, and then further onward to Borneo and Sulawesi. Carabaos are genetically distinct from the swamp buffaloes of Peninsular Malaysia and western Indonesia (Java and Sumatra), which show closer affinities to swamp buffaloes from Mainland Southeast Asia, indicating that they originated from a different introduction pathway.

== Description ==
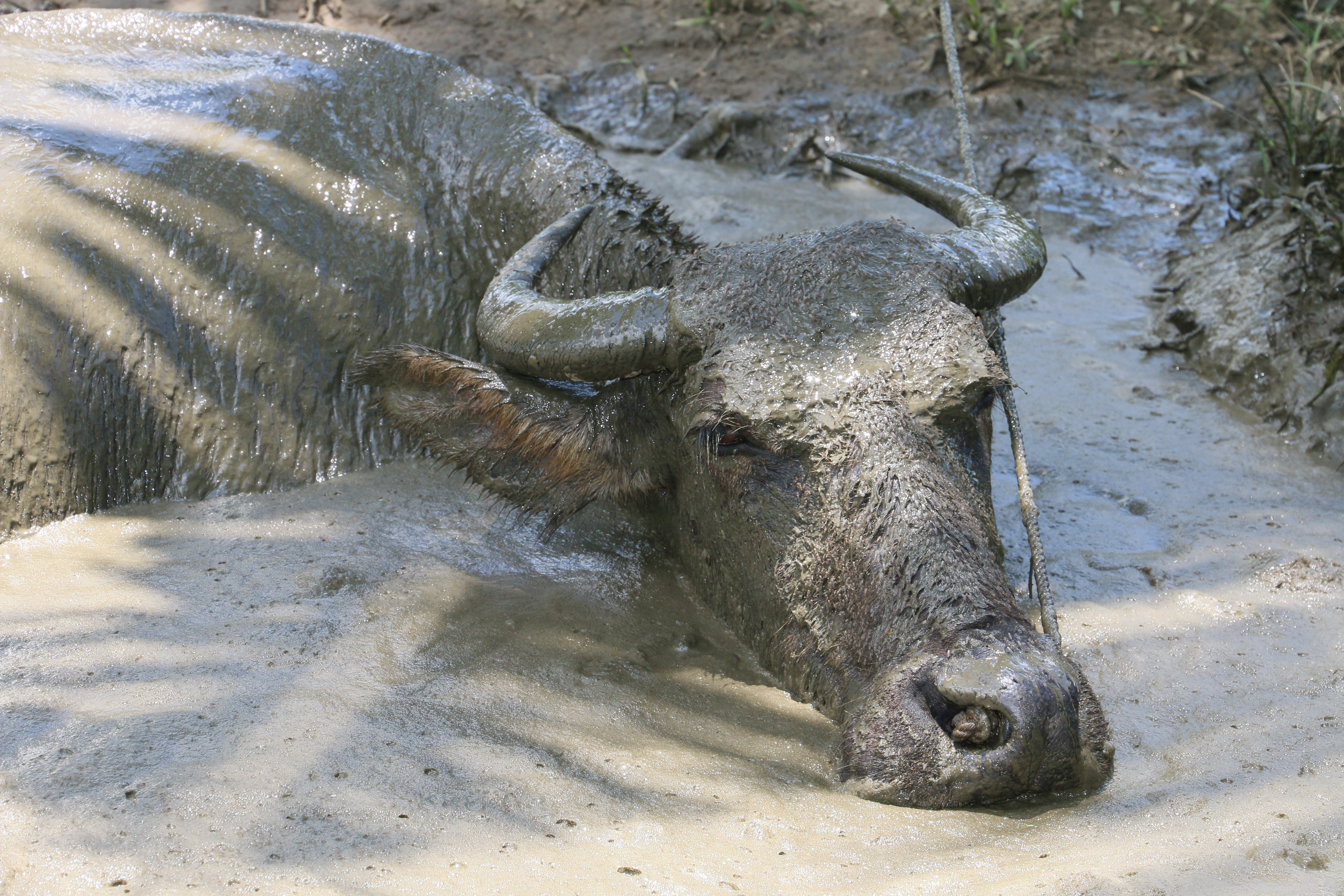
A carabao wallowing in a mudhole

Carabaos have the low, wide, and heavy build of draft animals. They vary in color from light grey to slate grey. The horns are sickle-shaped or curve backward toward the neck. Chevrons (light-colored markings on the lower jaw and chest) are common. Albinoids are present in the proportion of about 3% of the buffalo population. Mature male carabaos weigh 420–500 kg (930–1,100 lb), and females 400–425 kg (882–937 lb). Height at withers of the male ranges from 127 to 137 cm (50 to 54 in), and of the female from 124 to 129 cm (49 to 51 in).

Carabaos prefer to wallow in a mudhole that they make with the horns. Their objective is to acquire a thick coating of mud. They thrive on many aquatic plants and in time of flood will graze submerged, raising their heads above the water and carrying quantities of edible plants. They eat reeds, the giant reed, bulrush, sedges, the common water hyacinth, and rushes. Green fodders are used widely for intensive milk production and for fattening. Many fodder crops are conserved as hay, chaffed, or pulped. Trials in the Philippines showed that the carabao, on poor-quality roughage, had a better feed conversion rate than cattle.

== Husbandry ==
In 1993, the Philippine Carabao Center (PCC) was established to conserve, propagate, and promote the carabao as a source of draft animal power, meat, milk, and hide to benefit the rural farmers through carabao genetic improvement, technology development and dissemination, and establishment of carabao-based enterprises, thus ensuring higher income and better nutrition. The National Water Buffalo Gene Pool in Muñoz, Nueva Ecija, is a facility for continuous selection, testing, and propagation of superior breeds of dairy buffalo.

=== Draft animals ===
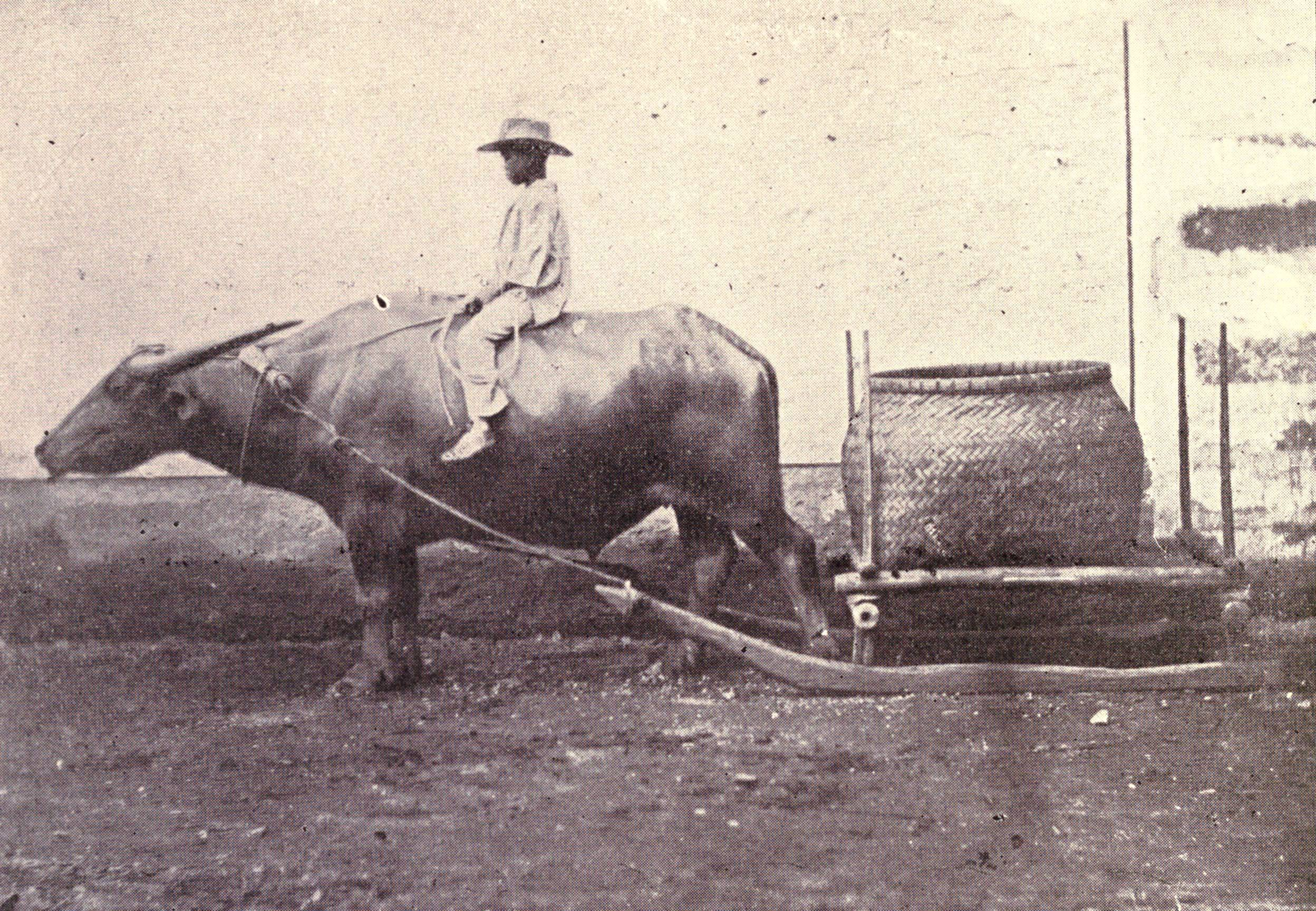
A carabao sled (kangga) in the Philippines (c. 1899)

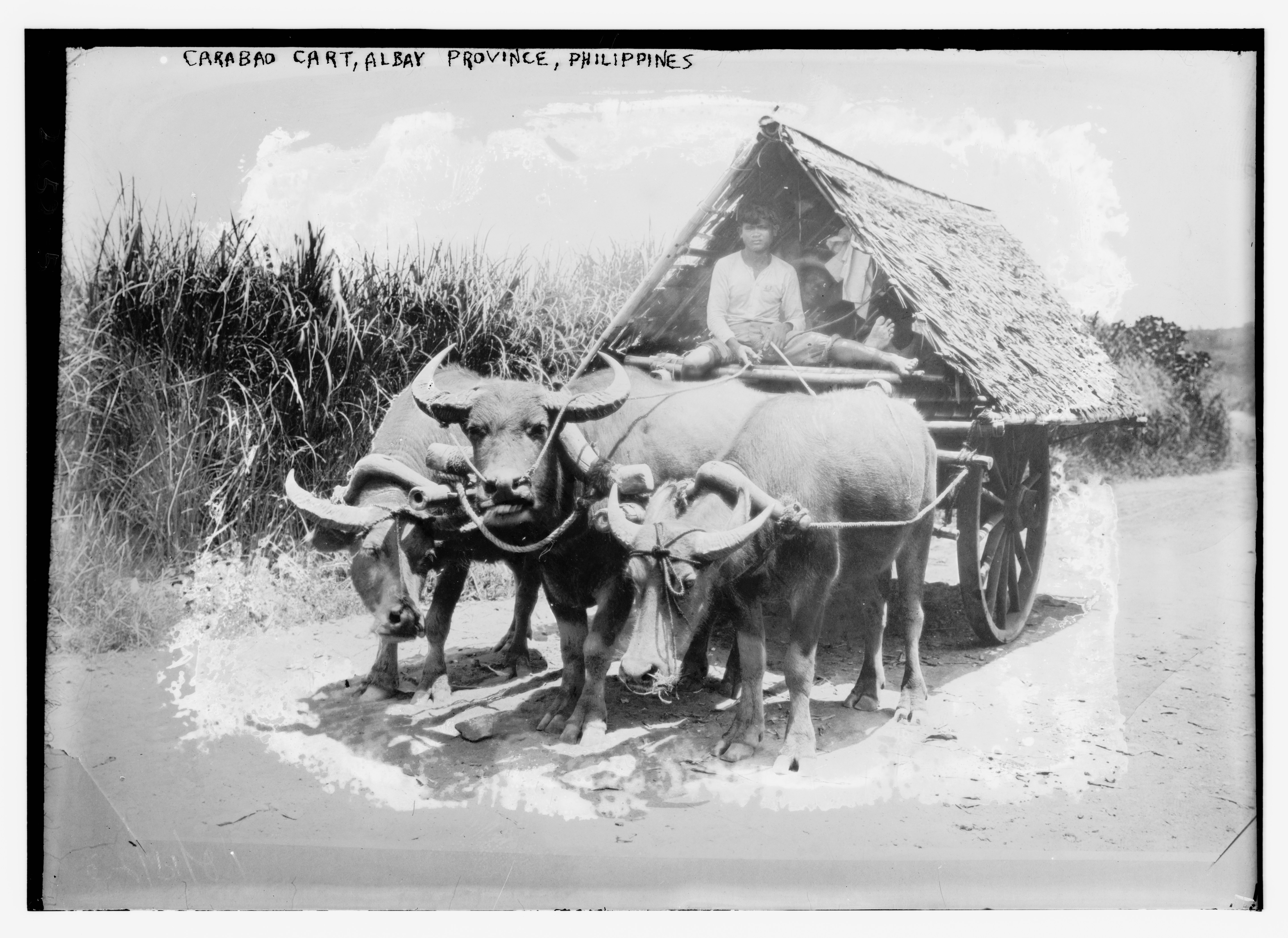
A carabao cart (kareton) in the Philippines (c. 1910)

Carabaos are mainly used as draft animals for paddy field rice cultivation. In 2023, the vast majority of Philippine carabaos (99.3%) are raised for this purpose by smallholder farmers. Carabaos raised as draft animals are typically docile and can be trained with simple commands. They are treated as a family pet and are regularly taken to bodies of water to bathe when not working. The advent of modern machinery like tractors are slowly displacing carabaos in their role as draft animals.

The traditional equipment used with the carabao is a plow or harrow attached to the animal by a yoke. In modern times, carabaos are also used to plow fields for crops that grow on dry land, like maize, sugarcane, or upland rice. Another older method of preparing fields with the carabao is known as payatak, which is still practiced by some farmers in Northern Samar. In payatak, the soil of the rice paddy is first softened with rainwater or diverted watershed, then the farmer guides a group of carabaos in trampling the planting area until it is soggy enough to receive the rice seedlings. This time-consuming task produces lower yields and lower income when compared with the advancement in irrigated fields.

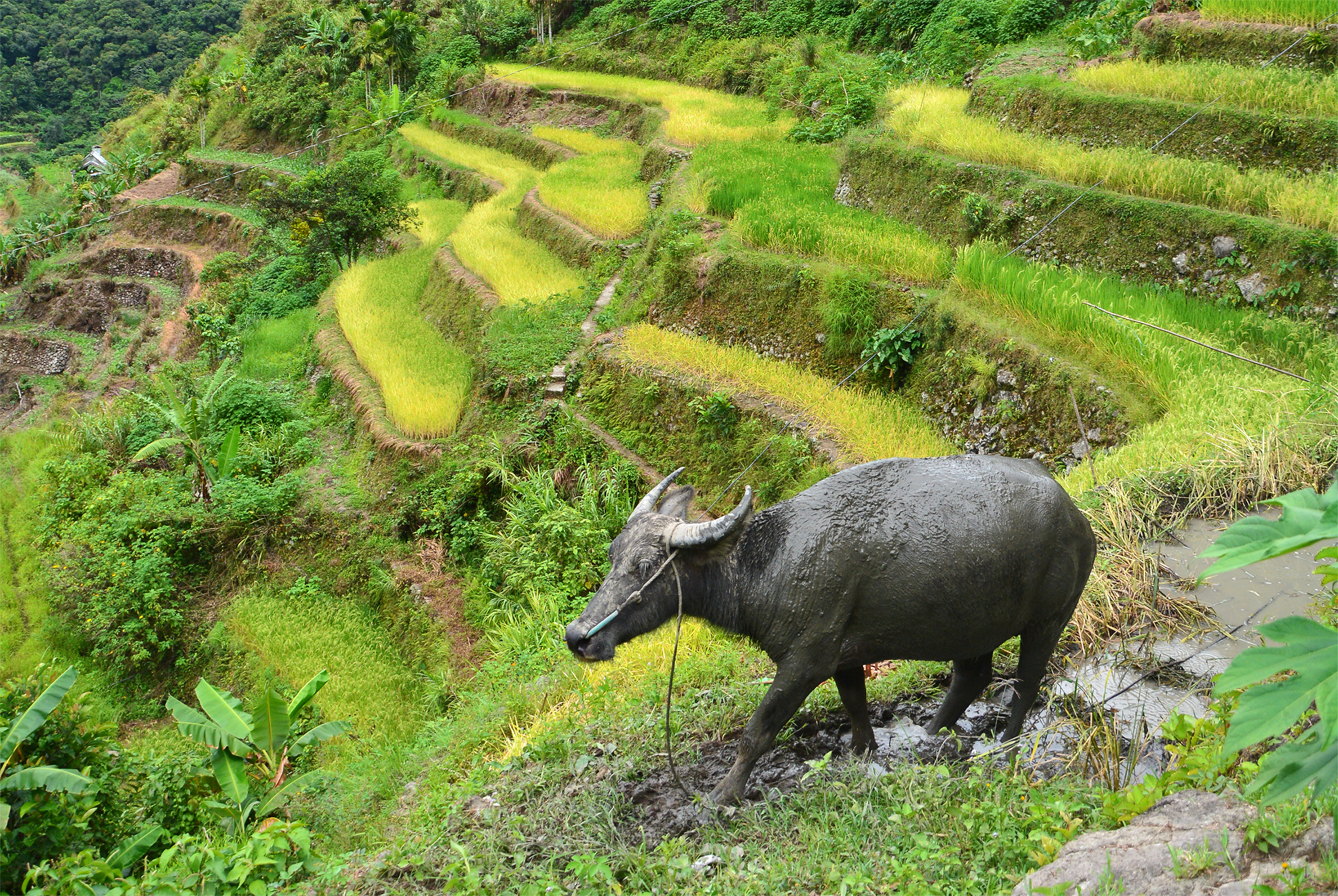
A carabao in the Banaue Rice Terraces

Before modern equipment, carabaos were also formerly used to thresh rice by trampling them while going around a post, separating the grains from the stalks. They were also used to power stone mills used for crushing sugarcane in pre-modern sugar production.

Carabaos were also widely used for transporting goods in the past, usually via a carabao sled (kangga) or a two-wheeled cart (gareta or careton, also spelled kareton or kariton, from Spanish carretón). The kangga is typically used for rocky or muddy terrain, and has the advantage of being capable of traveling over rice paddy dikes without destroying them. The careton, on the other hand, is typically reserved for traveling on roads. The careton come in various designs and can be covered in a roof of woven split bamboo (sawali) or thatched nipa palm leaves (pawid).

One of the many reasons for the failure of the attempted Japanese pacification of the Philippines during their 1941–1945 occupation was their indifference to the basics of the Philippine economy. The carabaos provided the necessary labor that allowed Philippine farmers to grow rice and other staples. Japanese army patrols would not only confiscate the rice, but would also slaughter the carabaos for meat, thereby preventing the farmers from growing enough rice to feed the large population. Before World War II, an estimated three million carabaos inhabited the Philippines. By the end of the war, an estimated nearly 70% of them had been lost.

=== Dairy products ===
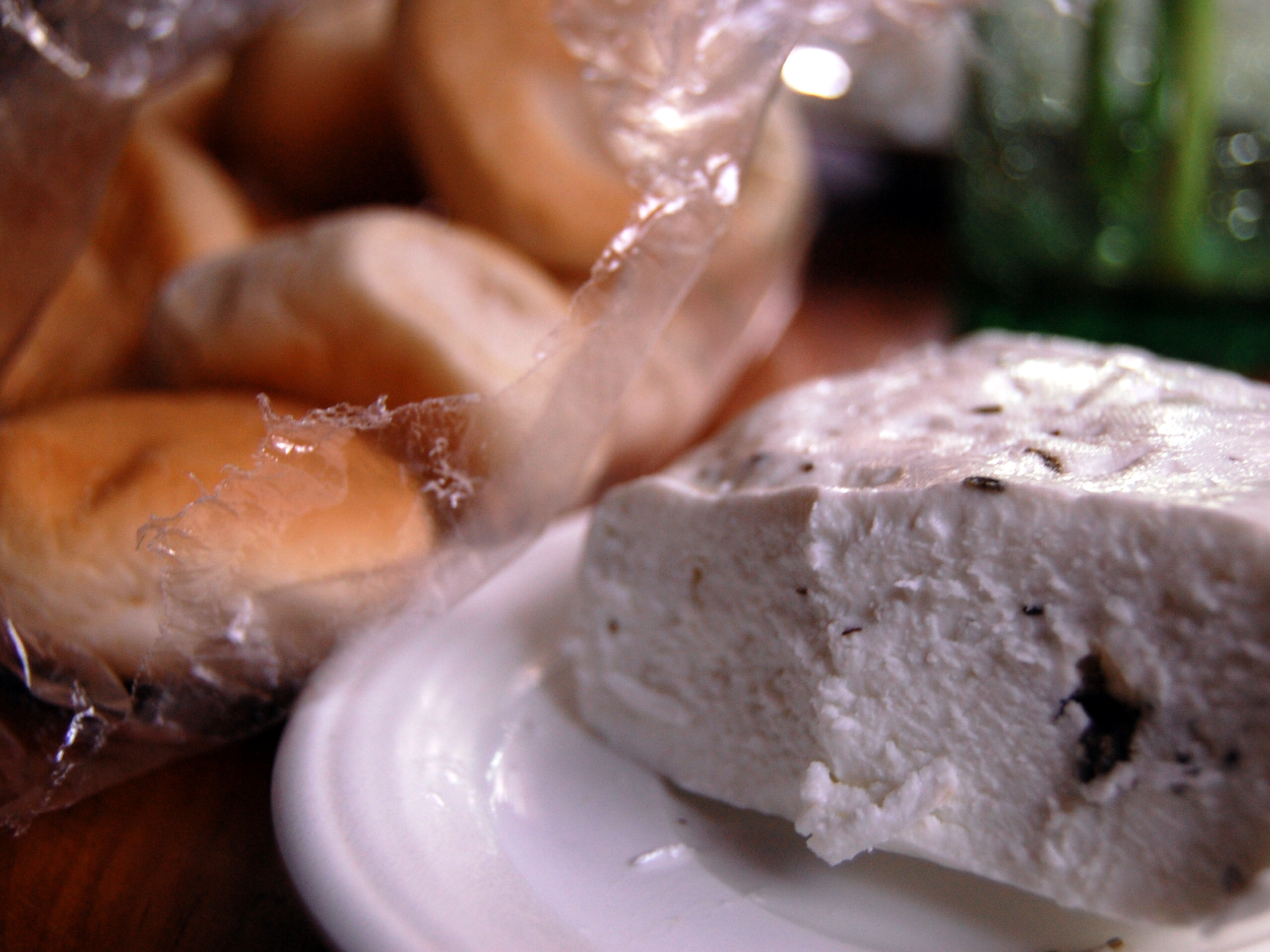
Kesong puti, a traditional Filipino soft cheese made from carabao milk

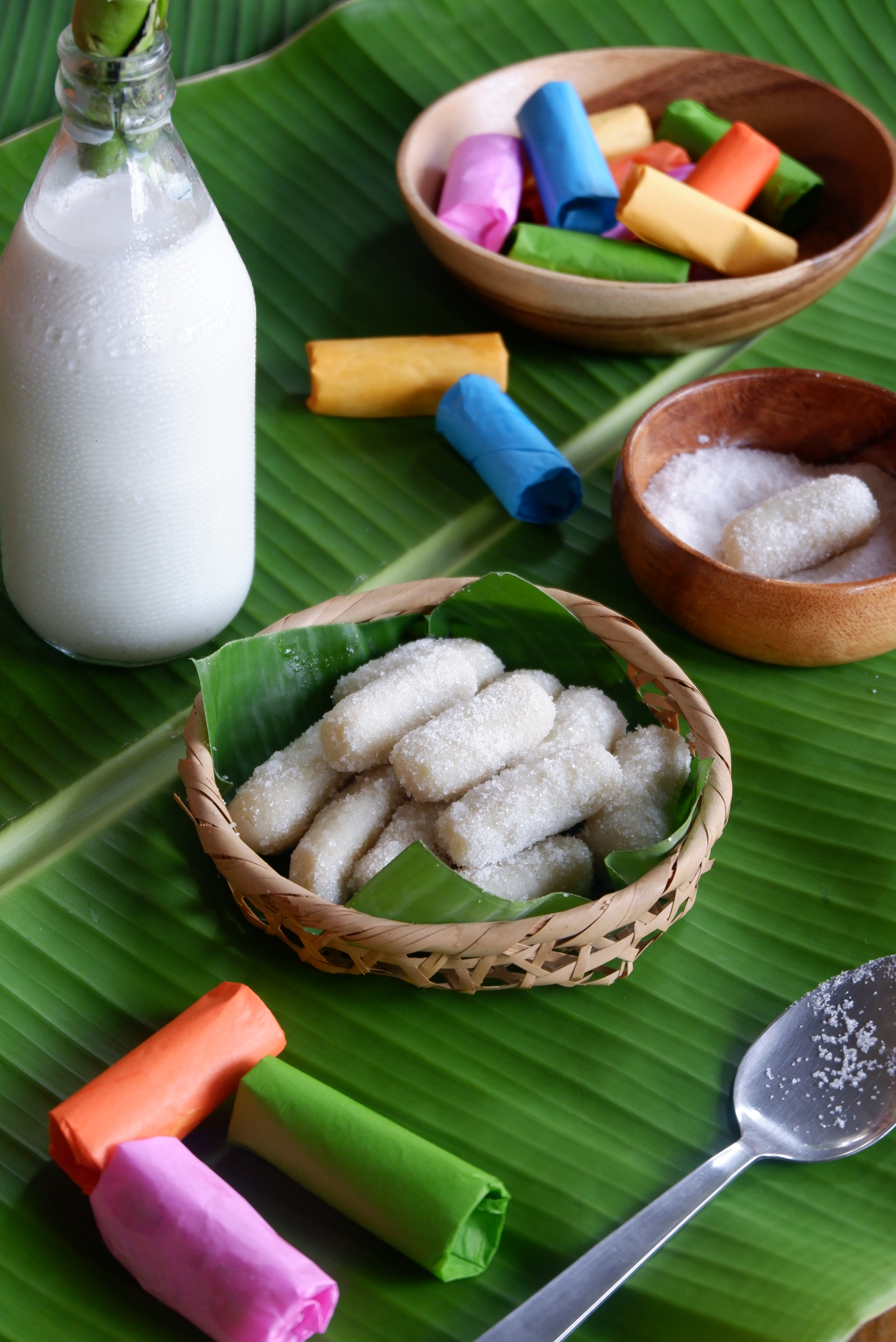
Pastillas de leche, a traditional milk candy made from carabao milk

Carabao milk is richer and creamier in texture than cow or goat milk, due to its much higher fat and protein content. It has similar mineral content as cow milk, except it has twice as much phosphorus. It is characteristically bluish-white in color. Carabao milk is typically home-pasteurized via a double boiler.

Carabao milk is used widely in traditional Filipino cuisine due to its easier availability prior to modern importation and the development of canned milk. However, it never became widely commercialized and still remains a cottage industry. One of the main goals of the Philippine Carabao Center is the development of a more productive breed of carabaos for commercial dairy production and to encourage the growth of the carabao milk industry in the private sector.

The most common use of carabao milk is for the production of kesong puti, a traditional soft cheese. It is also used for sweets including pastillas de leche, tibok-tibok, leche flan, and a traditional ice cream flavor for sorbetes known as helado de mantecado. Carabao milk can also eaten for breakfast or merienda poured over rice with various other ingredients.

=== Meat ===
The term "carabeef" is used to refer to the meat of carabaos in the Philippines. It is a portmanteau of "carabao" and "beef" and was originally coined in Philippine English in the 1970s to distinguish the meat of water buffalos from beef.

The butchering of carabaos is strictly regulated under Philippine law in an effort to conserve the population. Only carabaos that are seven years or older (if male) or eleven years or older (if female) can be slaughtered after the acquisition of necessary permits and clearances. In all other instances, the killing of carabaos is illegal. However, this law is often violated due to poor enforcement.

Carabeef is popular in some regions and can be used in dishes in place of beef, like in tapa, as well as in commercial processed meat like corned beef and longganisa. Carabao skin can also be cooked as chicharon.

=== Other products ===
Carabao hide was once used extensively to create a variety of products, including the armor of precolonial Philippine warriors. The horns are also carved and used to make the pommels of Philippine swords and bladed tools like bolos. Carabao hide is still used for leather production with an estimated total market value of $10 million, as of 2002.

=== Cross-breeding ===
The carabao has been crossbred with other water buffalo breeds. Notable breeds with carabao ancestry include the buffalypso of Trinidad and Tobago and the Brazilian carabao of Brazil. The buffalypso is the result of breeding programs that crossed the carabao with river-type buffaloes like the Murrah buffalo, the Surti buffalo, the Jaffarabadi buffalo, the Nili-Ravi, and the Bhadawari. Brazilian carabaos (called kalabaw or kalaban in Portuguese) are naturalized populations of swamp-type buffalos, including carabaos, imported from French Indochina to Brazil in the late 19th century.

== Conservation ==
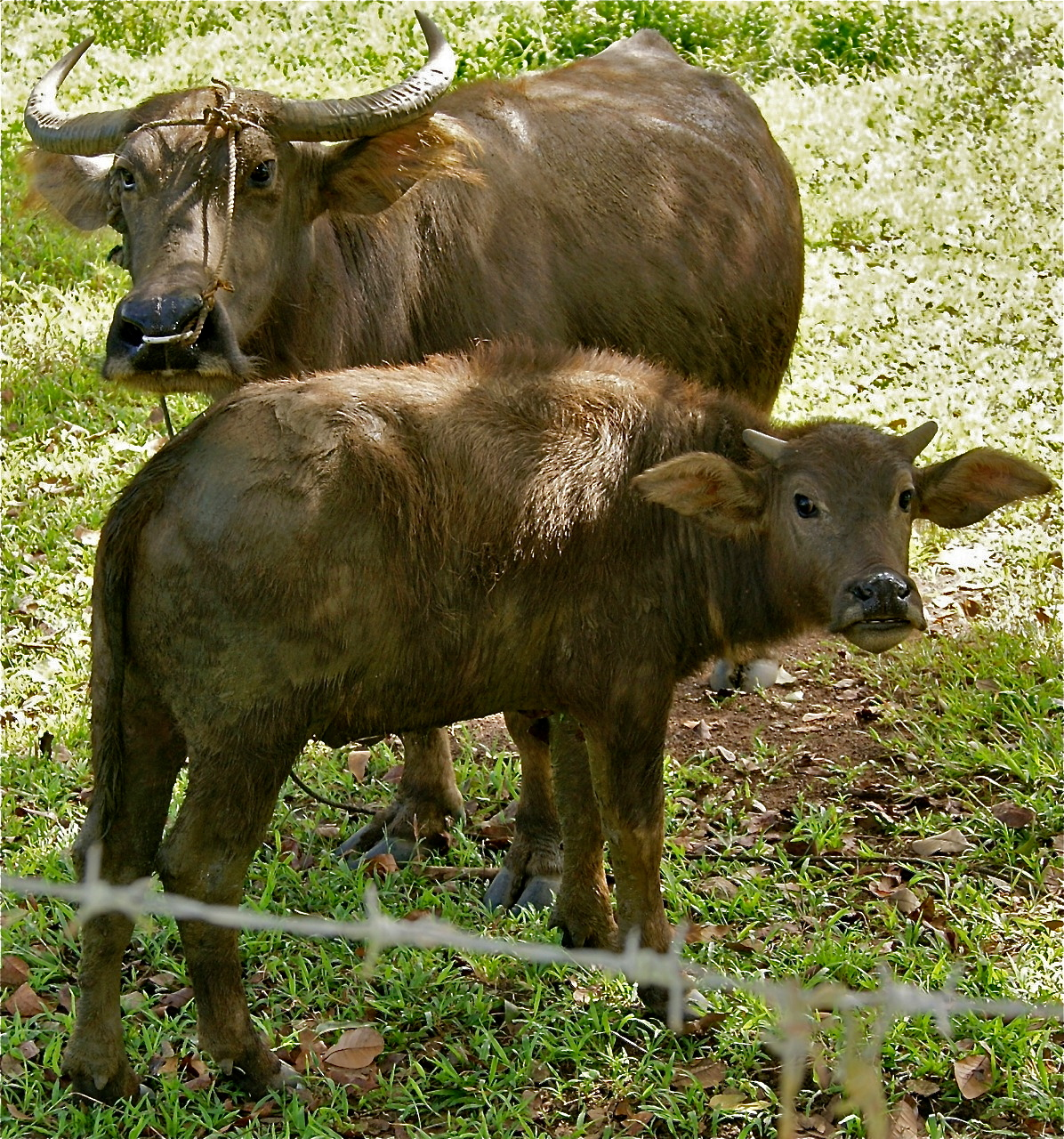
A female carabao (caraballa) with calf

As of 2023, there are an estimated 2.74 million heads of carabaos in the Philippines. 99.3% are from smallhold farms, while the remaining 0.5% and 0.2% are from semi-commercial and commercial farms, respectively. The highest population of carabaos is from the Bicol Region, with an estimated 324,220 heads, followed by the Western Visayas (251,570), Central Luzon (250,640), Central Visayas (218,290), and the Cagayan Valley (208,710).

Carabaos are increasingly being replaced by modern machinery, leading to more and more carabaos being slaughtered for meat as they lose their agricultural importance. They've also gone through population decimations in the past from diseases as well as carabao massacres in World War II.

Water buffalos have also been imported from abroad by the Philippine Carabao Center and crossbred with the carabao in an effort to develop a more productive breed for milk production. In 2015, an estimated 10,000 heads of the commercial herds of water buffalo in the Philippines are imported riverine-type breeds, most notably the Murrah buffalo (sourced from Brazil, Bulgaria, and Italy). Another 29,700 heads are crossbreeds of the carabao and imported river buffaloes.

Despite this, the PCC ensures that the native carabao gene pool is preserved by the cryopreservation of carabao germplasm. A cryobank facility for this purpose was inaugurated in 2012 in the Livestock Innovations and Biotechnology complex of the PCC national headquarters in Muñoz, Nueva Ecija. The cryobank also holds samples of other native breeds of domestic animals, as well as plans for the preservation of the germplasm of other threatened endemic species.

Various organizations have also created sanctuaries for native carabaos where slaughtering animals is restricted and the introduction of foreign breeds are banned. This includes the communal grazing grounds of Mahatao in the Batanes Islands; the national conservation site of carabaos in Peñablanca in Cagayan; and the municipality of President Carlos P. Garcia in Lapinig Island, Bohol.

== In culture ==
=== Festivals ===
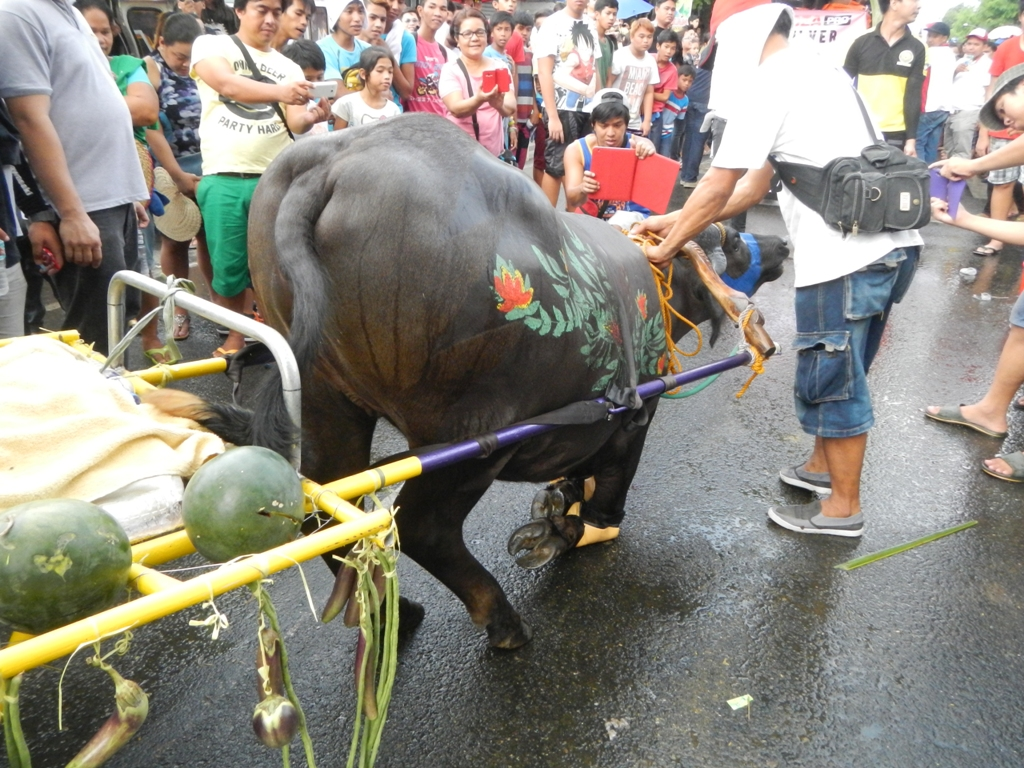
A painted carabao in the Kneeling Carabao Festival of Pulilan, Bulacan

The carabao is featured in numerous festivals (fiestas) in the Philippines due to its important role in rural farming communities. The festivals which feature carabaos prominently include:

- Pasungay Festival (San Joaquin, Iloilo) – A religious festival held on the Feast of the Santo Niño every third Saturday of January. The highlight of the festival is a traditional fight between two carabao bulls.
- Kariton Festival (Licab, Nueva Ecija) - A cultural festival held every last Saturday of March. It celebrates the carabao-drawn cart (kariton) used by the town's founding father.
- Kesong Puti Festival (Sta. Cruz, Laguna) - A cultural festival held from April 1 to 9 celebrating the traditional kesong putî industry.
- Karbo Festival (Vigan, Ilocos Sur) - A cultural festival held on the first week of May. It features a parade of painted carabaos. The name of the festival is derived from the local term for carabao.
- Carabao-Carroza Festival (Pavia, Iloilo) - A cultural festival held on May 3. It is the oldest festival of its kind and features a parade of colorful decorated carabao sleds.
- Gatas ng Kalabaw Festival (Nueva Ecija) - A provincial festival held on the second week of May aiming to promote carabao milk.
- Pastillas Festival (San Miguel, Bulacan) - A cultural festival held from May 5 to 7. It is a celebration of the town's iconic pastillas de leche, a traditional candy made from carabao milk.
- Kneeling Carabao Festival (Pulilan, Bulacan) - A religious festival held on May 14. The highlight of the event is the kneeling of carabaos as they pass by the door of the town church, in honour of Saint Isidore the Labourer.
- Pahiyas Festival (Lucban, Quezon) - A century-old cultural festival held every May 15 in honour of Saint Isidore the Labourer. The highlight of the festival is a parade of colorful decorated carabao carts.
- San Isidro Labrador Festival (Angono, Rizal) - A religious festival held on May 15 honoring the town's patron saint, Saint Isidore the Labourer. The highlight of the festival is a procession of carabaos with decorated carts full of farm products.
- Katigbawan Festival (Catigbian, Bohol) - A cultural festival held on June 16. It celebrates the carabao and its contributions to farmers.
- Queseo Festival (Compostela, Cebu) - A cultural festival held from June 24 to 25. The festival celebrates queseo, a local white cheese made from carabao milk.
- Nuang Festival (San Agustin, Isabela) - A cultural festival held on September 28. It celebrates the founding of the town and features a parade of carabaos.
- Karabaw Festival (Gandara, Samar) - A cultural festival held on September 29. It celebrates the carabao and features street dancers depicting carabaos.
- Turogpo Festival (Carigara, Leyte) - A cultural festival held during Holy Saturday. The word turogpo means "match" and it features a fight between two carabao bulls until one runs away from their opponent.

=== Symbolism ===
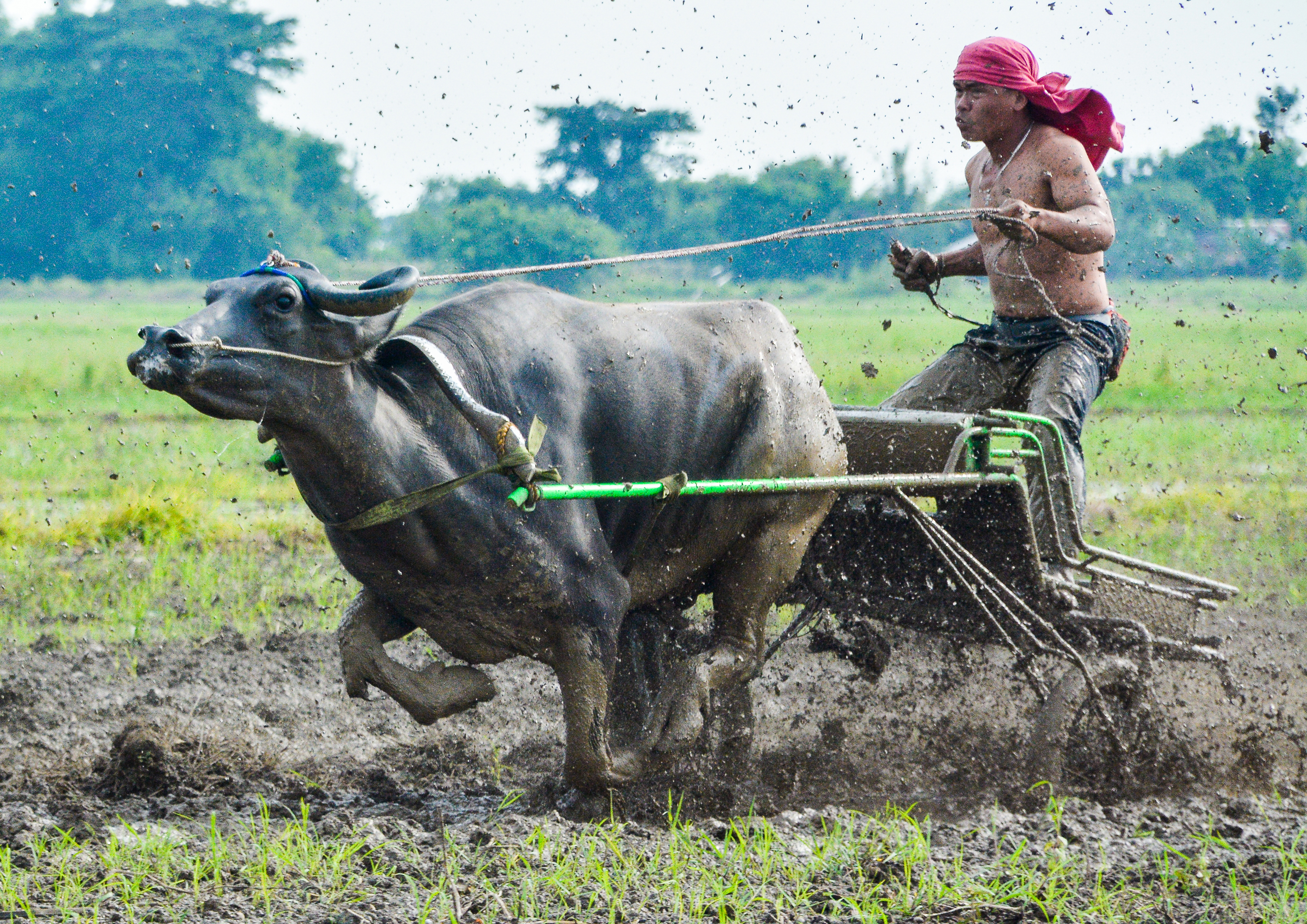
Carabao racing at the fiesta of Aliaga, Nueva Ecija

Despite the carabao being widely regarded as the national animal of the Philippines, the National Commission for Culture and the Arts of the Philippines has stated that this still has not been officially recognized by law. House Bill 3926, Philippine National Symbols Act of 2014, was proposed in Philippine Congress with the aim of officially declaring the country's national symbols, including the carabao as the national animal. It is currently still pending.

In the late 1980s, the carabao puppet character Kardong Kalabaw became popular as a symbol of the Philippine people's hard work and sense of industry.

The Military Order of the Carabao, a social club started in 1900 by American enlisted men fighting in the Philippine-American War, believes that the water buffalo symbolizes the "camaraderie that grows among members of the armed forces who face the dangers and privations of extensive military service far from home."

=== Carabao racing ===
Carabao racing is a widely popular sport among farmers and carabao enthusiasts in the Philippines. In central and southern Luzon and in South Cotabato some fiestas have carabao racing as their highlight. Training and conditioning of the race carabao to its full extent is a serious job. Farmers and their trustworthy carabaos gather together to race in a 500 metres (1,600 ft) dirt road. Spectators fill up this unique spectacle, some betting on their best carabaos, others watch for the thrill. The carabaos, geared with their carts on their back, race together with their farmer to win prizes. The race is divided into two classes, one for amateur or first-time carabao racers and the other is for the veteran carabao racers. A race carabao can be bought for ₱35,000 to ₱60,000, with the price increasing with the number of races that it wins. Proven race winners can command a price as high as ₱200,000.

== In Guam ==
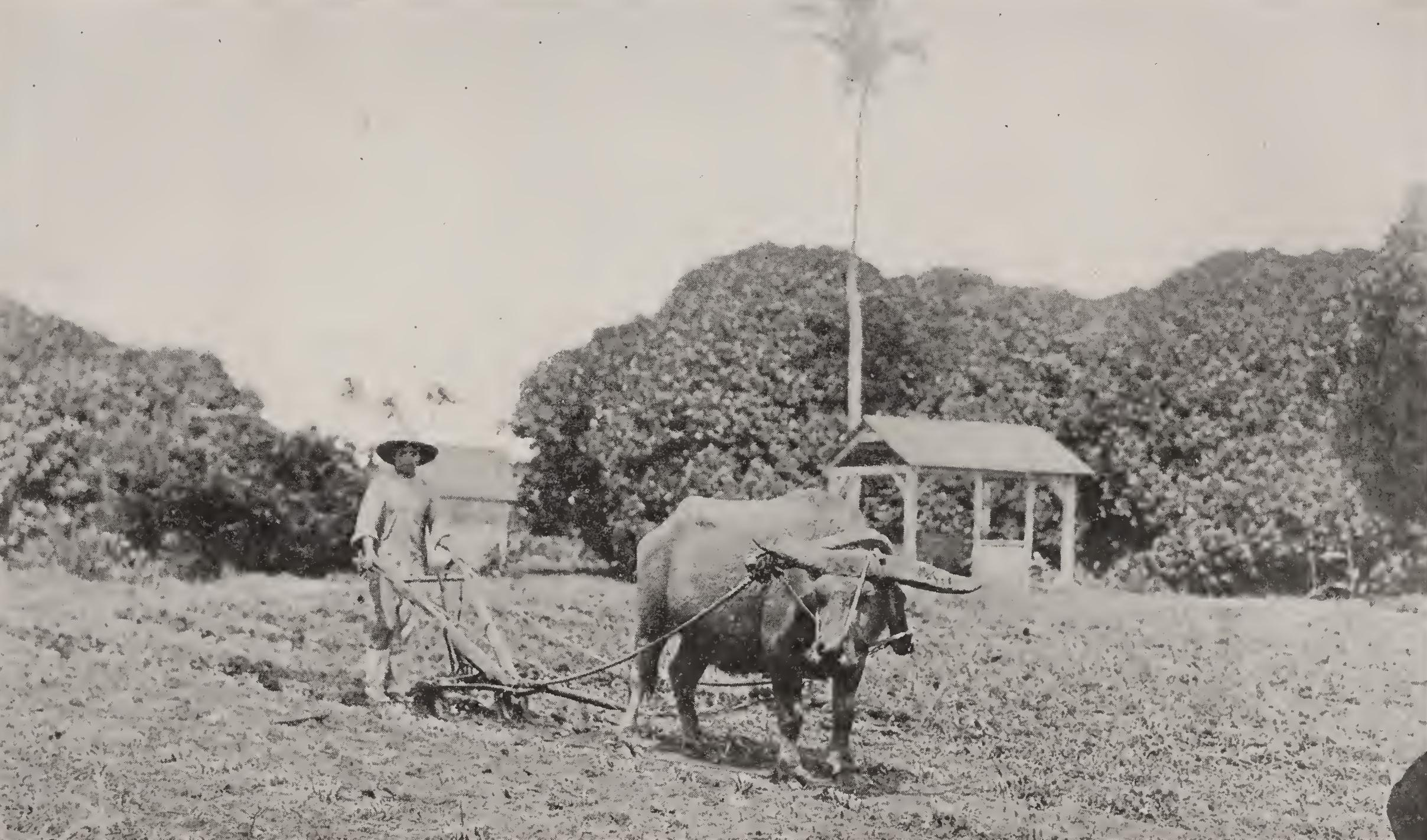
A carabao plowing a field in Guam (c. 1917)

Carabaos were introduced to Guam by Spanish missionaries in the 17th century from domestic stock in the Philippines to be used as beasts of burden. A feral herd on the US Naval Magazine in central Guam was classified as protected game, but the population has been declining since 1982, most likely due to illegal hunting.

Carabaos were used for farming and for pulling carts. They were fairly common on Guam before the 20th century, with a population numbering in the thousands. Today, they are rare in most parts of the island except in the US Naval Magazine near the village of Santa Rita, which is fenced on all sides. The carabao population of Naval Magazine has grown to several hundred, to the point that they have become a pest and caused environmental damage, and polluted the water supply in the Fena Reservoir. In 2003, the Navy began a program of extermination to control the carabao population of Naval Magazine, a move that was protested by many Chamorro people.

The carabao is considered a symbol of Guam. In the early 1960s, carabao races were a popular sport in the island, especially during fiestas. Today, carabaos are a part of the popular culture. They are often brought to carnivals or other festivities, and are used as a popular ride for children. Carabao meat is sometimes eaten as a delicacy.

== See also ==
- List of water buffalo breeds
