= Banni buffalo =

Breed of buffalo

Banni buffalo, which are also known as "Kutchi" or "Kundi", is a breed of buffalo found primarily in the Kutch district of Gujarat, India. The word 'Banni' is specific to not only the buffaloes but as well as the pasture grass species which are native to this region. This breed of buffaloes is usually bred and preserved by a local community found in Kutch, called the 'Maldharis'. An average Banni buffalo yields around 12 to 18 litres of milk each day.

The Banni buffalo has a different genetic makeup as compared to more common breeds, which allows for longer lactation periods, higher milk production potentials and also makes it disease resistant. It has also become the main source of livelihood for Maldharis, and they are also slowly gaining popularity in other regions such as Mumbai. The Banni buffalo is well-adapted to survive the extreme weather conditions such as water scarcity, frequent droughts, low humidity and high temperatures, unlike other commonly found buffaloes such as the 'Murrah' and 'Jaffarabadi'. The Banni buffalo breed sustains itself in these harsh climatic conditions by consuming the naturally available grasses growing in this belt. They are also trained to return by themselves to their specific hamlets in the morning.

== Origin and recognition ==
The Banni buffalo breed originates from the Sind region in Pakistan. What is now referred to as the Banni land, was given to the Maldhari community 500 years ago by the rulers of the Kutch district for livestock grazing.

=== Recognition from the government ===
The Banni buffalo was recognised as the 11th buffalo breed in India by the Indian Breed Registration Committee, ICAR, New Delhi, in the year 2010. It wasn't considered a different breed of buffaloes until 2002. K. P. Singh, a livestock scientist from Gujarat Agricultural University started working with his colleague BP Mishra and a Bhuj-based NGO called 'Sahjeevan' on a pilot research project. After two years of data collection, it was discovered that the molecular construct of Banni buffaloes was different from that of other breeds. This project was funded by the Indian Council of Agricultural Research (ICAR) and led to the formation of the Banni Breeders' Association.

Banni Breeders' Association filed an application for the registration of the breed followed by applications from scientists. An initiative of opening cooperatives for the Maldharis was also taken up by The National Dairy Development Board.

In 2010, Banni buffalo was recognised by the Breed Registration Committee, ICAR, New Delhi as the 11th breed of India.

== Location and population ==
The Banni region is a grassland situated, at 23019'N to 23052'N to 68056'E to 70032'E, in the district of Kutch in Gujarat, India. Spanning over 2600 square kilometres, this pasture land has over 30 varieties of grass. The Banni buffalo travels a distance of about 10 to 15 kilometres to reach these grasslands each day. Travelling a greater distance enables the Banni to fully digest all the grass, and in turn, helps in increasing the rate of metabolism, leading to an increased yield of milk.

According to the seventeenth livestock census of 2003, conducted by the government of India, the total population of the Banni buffalo was 3,190,000 in Gujarat, with around 1,780,000 in Kutch alone. Banni buffalo is also distributed throughout other parts of Gujarat, and Maharashtra due to their high milk yield. Banni buffalo was recognised as the eleventh buffalo breed of India by Indian council of agricultural research in 2011. A herd of Banni buffaloes comprises 40-50 members, with the maximum going to 100. Banni buffaloes cover a grazing distance of 8 to 10 kilometres in Monsoon and up to 15 kilometres in the summer.

In the last few decades, there has been an increase in Prosopis juliflora. Considered as an invasive weed in this region, prosopis juliflora has resulted in the decline of Kankrej cattle, which gave rise to Banni buffaloes who remained unaffected by it. Banni Buffalo were also able to adapt to the harsh water conditions.

The Banni buffalo is bred according to the traditional practices of the Maldharis. They state that it's "the Banni grasslands and the Maldharis who can create the Banni buffalo". Any buffalo not raised by Maldharis and not have grazed the grounds of Banni cannot be classified as a Banni buffalo. The Maldharis also maintain the original bloodline of Banni buffaloes, whilst also being critical at selection of the breeding bulls. The preferred "physiological features that include coiled horns, short but sturdy legs, convex forehead and white tail hairs. Each breeding bull is limited to three services per day and breeding bulls are exchanged between nearby villages every 3-4 years to avoid inbreeding".

== Physical traits ==
=== Body ===
Banni buffaloes have a compact, wedge-shaped body which can be of medium to large size. They have a body length of 154cm (61 in), face length of 54cm (21 in), with the length of their tail being 89cm (35 in). On an average, a male and female Banni Buffalo weigh around 525-562 kg and 475-575 kg respectively, with most of them having a horizontal ear orientation and the ear length being around 30 cm (12 in). Its head has no slope towards the base of the horns and is slightly depressed in the middle. The neck region is found to be medium and thin in females whereas it is thick and heavy in males with the dewlap being absent in both. They have a deeper chest and a long barrel with a rounded rib structure, and medium length limbs with broad bones. Due to the effect of adaptation to grazing under extensive production systems, their hooves are black, small and firmly attached. The udders are round and well developed in Banni buffaloes. It is divided into four equal divisions with the teats attached to each of them. The shape of the teats is conical with round and pointed tips. Banni buffaloes tend to be black in colour with 5% of them being brown. Other distinct appearances include having white patches on their forehead, tail and their lower legs. Their eyes are black in colour and the tail consists of both white and black colour.

=== Horns ===
Banni buffaloes have coiled horns that have a vertical orientation. 31.20% of these buffaloes have inverted double coiled horns while 68.80% of them have inverted single coiled horns. The diameter of the horns, which are medium to large and heavy, ranges from 24 to 30 cm in an adult buffalo. This is an important physiological feature for the breeders, especially during the selection of bulls which are to be used for the purpose of breeding.

== Special characteristics ==
According to the genotyping conducted by the National Bureau of Animal Genetic Research (NBAGR), Karnal and Sardarkrushinagar Dantiwada Agricultural University (SDAU), it has been confirmed that the Banni buffalo is a distinct breed. The Banni buffalo is known to have certain special characteristics. One of these features is their genetic potential for high milk production. The average annual milk yield is 6000 litres and the daily milk yield is 18-19 litres. The formation of the cooperative society by the pastoralists has made it possible for the breeders to sell more than 2,50,000 litres of milk daily to the dairy industry at a price of Rs.45 to Rs.55. Before the formation of this cooperative, this milk was sold at Rs.15 to Rs.19 per litre

The Banni buffalo is also known for its night grazing quality. The distance that can be covered by the herds range from 8-10 kilometres in Monsoon to 15 kilometres in Summer with the herd size ranging from 40-50 animals to 90-200 animals. The herds leave in the evening, and after the second milking, they return at dawn. Despite the magnitude of herds and the animals in them, the buffaloes rarely get lost or mixed with a different herd. This quality of night-grazing allows them to avoid harsh day temperatures and also accommodate temperature differences.

This breed has a lactation length of 290-295 days with a lactation yield of 2500-2700 litres. Apart from this, the buffaloes are also known for their regular breeding and hardy nature.

== Maldhari community ==
Maldhari is a Gujarati word for pastoralists and literally translates to cattle breeders. Over years they have developed and preserved the best bloodline of the Banni buffalo by practicing natural, selective breeding. Origins of the Maldhari community can be traced back to states like Rajasthan and some parts of Gujarat, in India

At present this community has settled in the Banni Grasslands, located along the northern border of Kutch district in Gujarat. The Maldharis have settled in different areas and hence have evolved into various castes and cultures.

The Maldharis have been known to protect the grassland ecosystem of Banni since the last 700 years and preserve its biodiversity. Out of the various breeds being preserved, some breeds are indigenous to the ecosystem of Banni.

=== Banni Breeders Association ===
Maldharis along with help and support from a local organization Sahjeevan, gave membership to 650 animal breeders of the region of Banni forming Banni Pashu Ucherak Maldhari Sangathan (Banni Breeders' Association) in the year 2008. The organisation achieved recognition for the breed of Banni buffalo as a distinct buffalo breed from National Bureau of Animal Genetic Resources (NBAGR), Karnal and Sardarkrushinagar Dantiwada Agricultural University (SDAU)
