= Mehsana buffalo =

Breed of buffalo

Mehsana
- Country of origin: India
- Use: dairy

Traits
- Weight: Male: 570 kg; Female: 430 kg
- Skin color: Jet black
- Coat: Jet black

Mehsana are a breed of water buffalo from the state of Gujarat, India. They are known for their mixture of murrah and surti blood. They are raised for milk production, and are known as one of the best milk breeds in India. They are named for the town of Mehsana, in northern Gujarat, where these buffalo are still concentrated.
