= Nagpuri (buffalo) =

Breed of water buffalo originating in India

- Country of origin: India
- Type: River

Traits
- Height: Male: average 145 cm; Female: average 135 cm
- Coat: Black

The Nagpuri is a breed of water buffalo originating in Maharashtra, India. It stands better amongst the breeds of buffaloes which combine the milk and drought qualities in a better proportion in adverse climatic conditions. It is a River-type buffalo and a central Indian breed. The breed has many synonyms, such as "Berari", "Gaorani", "Purnathadi", "Varhadi", "Gaolavi", "Arvi", "Gaolaogan", "Gangauri", "Shahi" and "Chanda".

== Origin ==
As the name applies, Nagpuri buffalo is a versatile breed of the Vidarbha region of Maharashtra, India. The animals of this breed are very well adapted to the harsh-semi-arid conditions of Vidarbha region.

== Physiological and physical characteristics ==
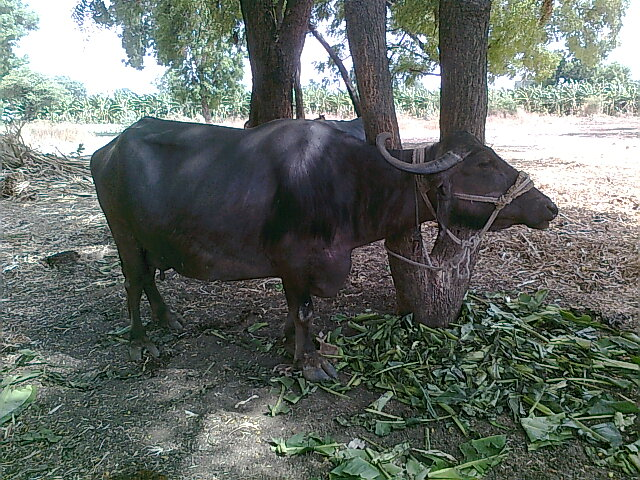
A Nagpuri buffalo in the farmlands of Maharashtra, India.

Coat color is black. The breed is black with white patches on face, legs and tail tips. However, the "Purnathadi" strain, one of the productive strains of Nagpuri buffalo, is slightly brown in color. The horns are long, flat and curved, bending backward on each side of the neck nearly up to the shoulders with tips pointed mostly in upward direction. Average height of Nagpuri buffalo is 145 cm for male and 135 cm for female and heart girth is 210 and 205 cm for male and female respectively.

== Rearing and production ==
The animals are maintained in semi-intensive management system. Male body weight average 525 kg where female attains about 425 kg. Buffaloes and heifers in this area are reared mainly for fat production. Average milk yield per lactation is 1039 kg ranging 760–1500 kg with average milk fat of 8.25% ranging 7.0-8.8%. Nagpuri can withstand extreme climatic conditions as high as 47 °C even in respect of milk production and fertility. Male animal is used for draught purposes but it works slower than domestic cattle.
