= Pandharpuri buffalo =

Breed of water buffalo

Pandharpuri
- Other names: Dharwari
- Country of origin: India
- Distribution: Kolhapur, Sangli, Solapur and Satara districts of Maharashtra, India
- Use: dairy

Traits
- Weight: Female: average 416 kg
- Height: Female: average 130 cm
- Coat: black

The Pandharpuri is a breed of water buffalo native to the dry regions of Solapur, Kolhapur, Satara and Sangli in India. The name is derived from the town Pandharpur in Solapur.

The Pandharpuri buffalo has 60-100 centimetre-long horns which are sometimes twisted and are the longest amongst domestic cattle breeds. In some exceptions these horns even extend to the rear feet.

Lactation length is 350 days, calving interval is 465 days. Milk yield is 1400 kg/305 days. Milk is rich in protein and calcium but contains less fat.
