= Bhadawari =

Improved water buffalo breed from Uttar Pradesh, India

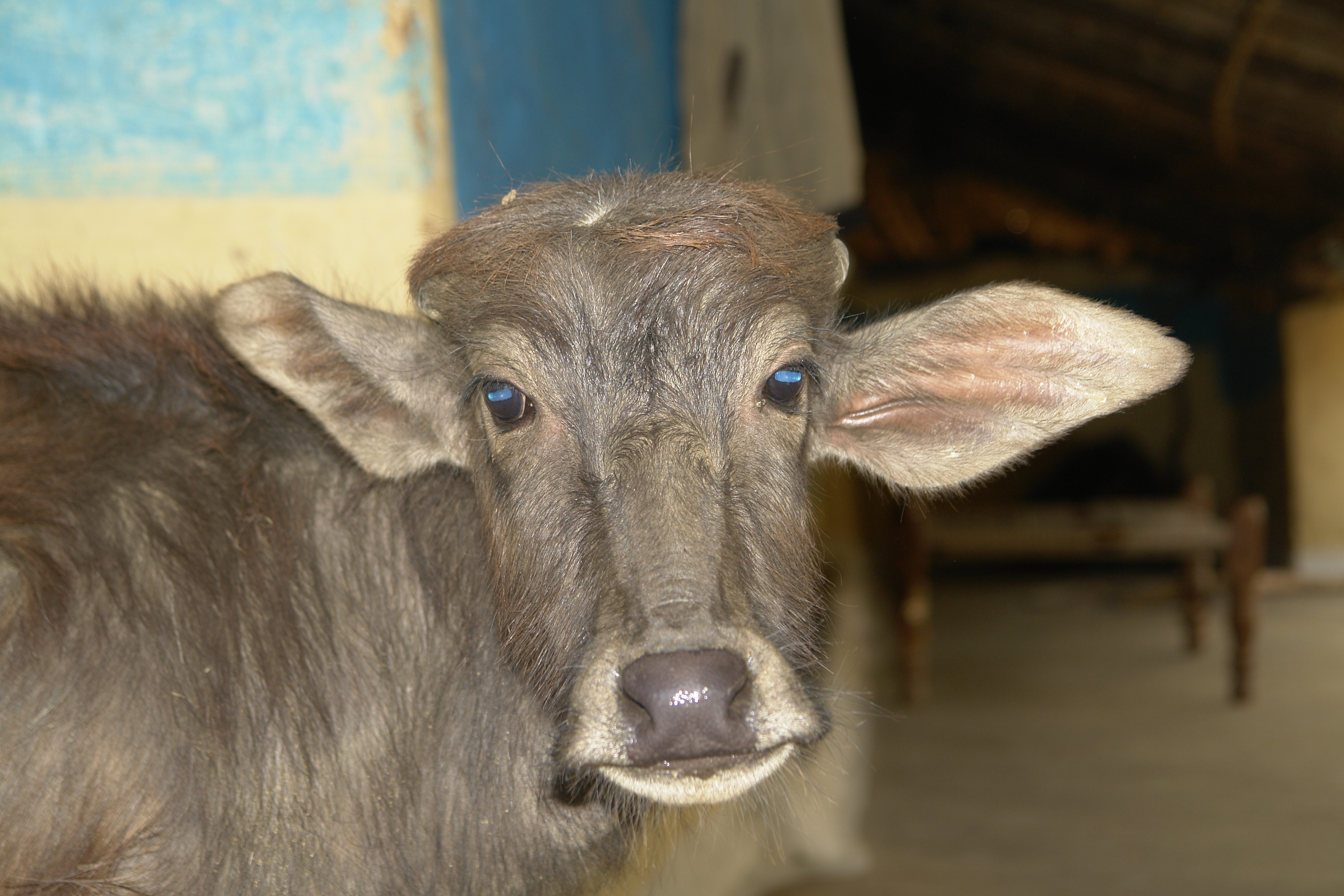
- Other names: Bhadwari; Etawah
- Country of origin: India
- Distribution: Uttar Pradesh, Madhya Pradesh
- Type: River
- Use: Dairy

Traits
- Weight: Male: average 475 kg; Female: average 425 kg
- Height: Male: ca. 128 cm; Female: ca. 124 cm

Bhadwari is an improved water buffalo breed from Uttar Pradesh, India, that is kept for milk production mainly in the Agra and Etawah districts, and in the Bhind and Morena districts of Madhya Pradesh. Cows usually lactate during 272 days with an average milk yield of 752–810 kg (1,658–1,786 lb) in this period.

Buffaloes play an indispensable role in the Indian economy, accounting for about 56% of total milk production in the nation, and 64% of the world's production. Their contribution has been overwhelming due to their ability to thrive under harsh climatic condition and low requirement of input contribution.

Bhadawari buffaloes are specifically renowned for the high content of butterfat found in their milk, which ranges from 6.0 to as high as 12.5%. The relatively high percentage of butterfat present in their milk is due to the breed's efficiency in converting animal feed into butterfat; the Bhadawari buffaloes' unique, advantageous profile therefore attracts farmers of many developing countries to interbreed them with one of the best meat and milch breed of buffaloes, the Murrah breed. Increasingly important in the livestock industry of countries with agricultural-based economies such as Bulgaria, the Philippines, Thailand, Malaysia, and Nepal, the resulting hybrid breed of the Bhadawari and Murrah enhances the milk production of other low-yielding breeds and creates a better market for liquid milk.

India has a population of 105 million buffalos, and 26.1% of the population lives in Uttar Pradesh. India also has nine well-recognized breeds based on their phenotypic characteristics (Murrah, Nili-Ravi, Surti, Jaffarabadi, Bhadawari, Mehsana, Nagori, Toda, and Pandarpuri), distributed over several agroclimatic zones.

== Conservation ==
The pure Bhadawari breed has dwindled to a population of only several thousand because of crossbreeding with the Murrah buffalo. In the area of Uttar Pradesh, India, Murrah buffalo traits are becoming more common. Many view the germplasm of the Bhadawari extremely valuable for conservation.

== Physical characteristics ==
The Bhadawari buffaloes are medium-sized, copper-colored and grayish black animals, with two white lines at the lower side of the neck, which is a distinct feature of these buffaloes. The horns are curled slightly outwards, parallel to the neck with the tips curled upwards. They are known to be more resistant to disease and the effects of heat than other buffalo breeds, which makes them ideal for a domesticated draught animal.

== Diet ==
The Bhadawari mainly subsists on coarse feed, straw, corn products, roughage such as barley or wheat straw, cornstalks, sorghum, and sugarcane residuals. Under dire circumstances, the Bhadawari can survive on low-quality crop residues and green forage.

== Calving patterns ==
A 2011 study in the Bundelkhand region of India was performed with the objective of documenting the calving pattern of Bhadawari (and the closely relate Murrah) buffaloes. Areas like Bundelkhand are found throughout India, as heavily dependent on livestock economics due to drought and monsoons, as a whole India has 95 buffaloes per 1,000 human beings; information on calving is detrimental to this region of the world. At the Indian Grassland and Fodder Research Institute in Jhansi, a herd of Bhadawari was intensely managed under a standardized system of nutritional requirements, and was done so over a period of 8 years (starting in 2002). All the while, birth rate was kept in the view of climatological data. Results indicated that rainy (July-Sept) and autumn (Oct-Nov) seasons yielded the highest calving rate, at more than 70%, whereas the lower calving rates were in the winter season at 15.48% and the summer season at 4.88%. Results were then cross-referenced with calving patterns across India and around other parts of the world such as Egypt. The seasonality in the Bhadawari calving indicates that reproductive desire is more dependent on climatic changes than diet.

== Milk composition ==
Overall, buffalo milk has greater nutritional properties and values than cow milk. Buffalo milk has higher levels of fat, lactose, protein, calcium, and vitamins A and C, with lower levels of vitamin E, riboflavin, and cholesterol. An absence of carotene exists, and bioactive pentasaccharides and gangliosides occur that are not present in cow milk. Fat globules are larger, but contain less membrane material than cow milk. However, specific breed of buffalo does affect milk composition. In a 2008 comparison of four Indian buffalo breeds, the Bhadawari was shown to have more solids not fat than the Murrah, which had the highest performance for fat, total protein, and casein contents.
