= Jafarabadi buffalo =

Indian buffalo breed

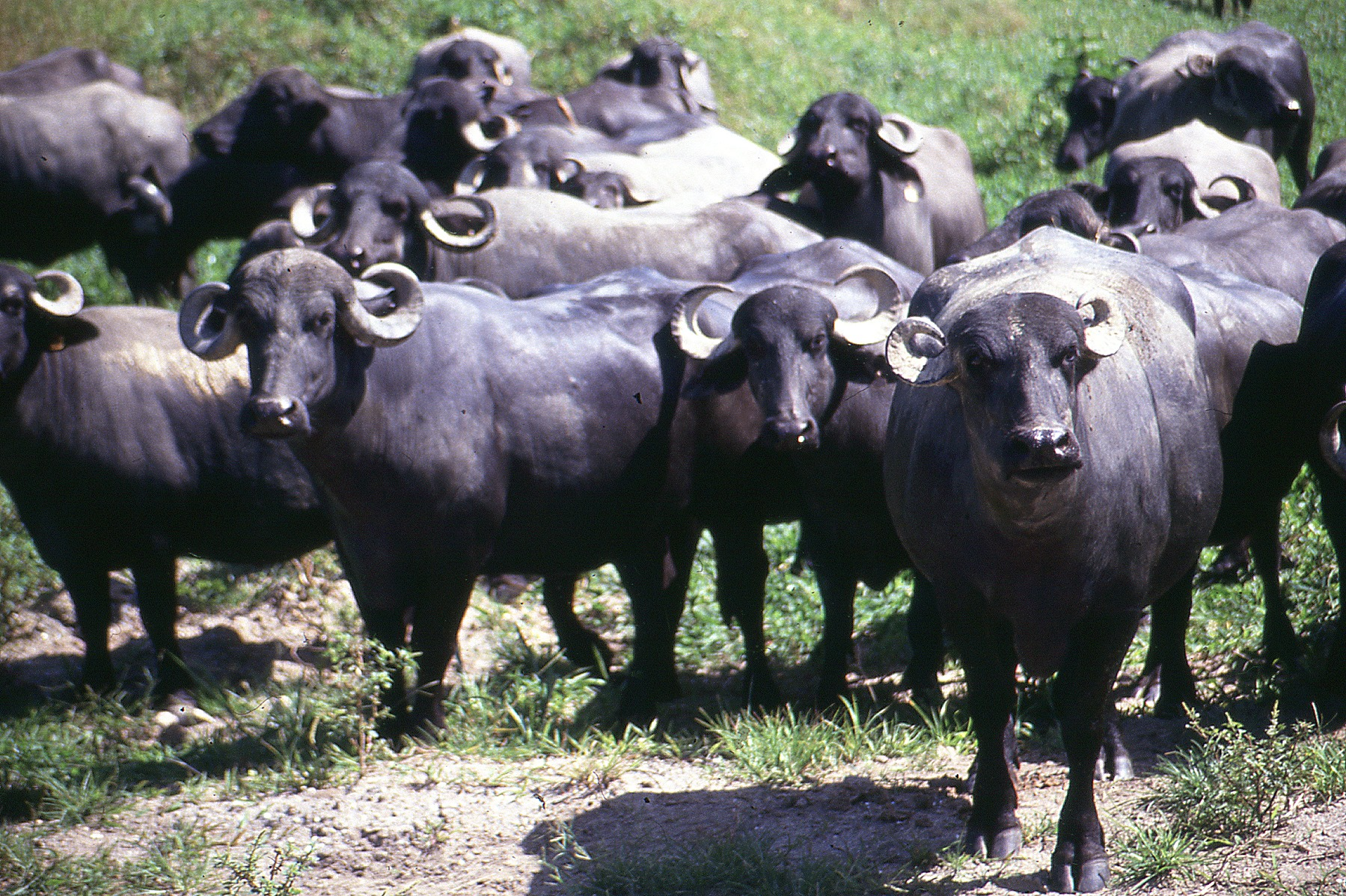
A herd of Jafarabadi and Murrah buffaloes in Brazil

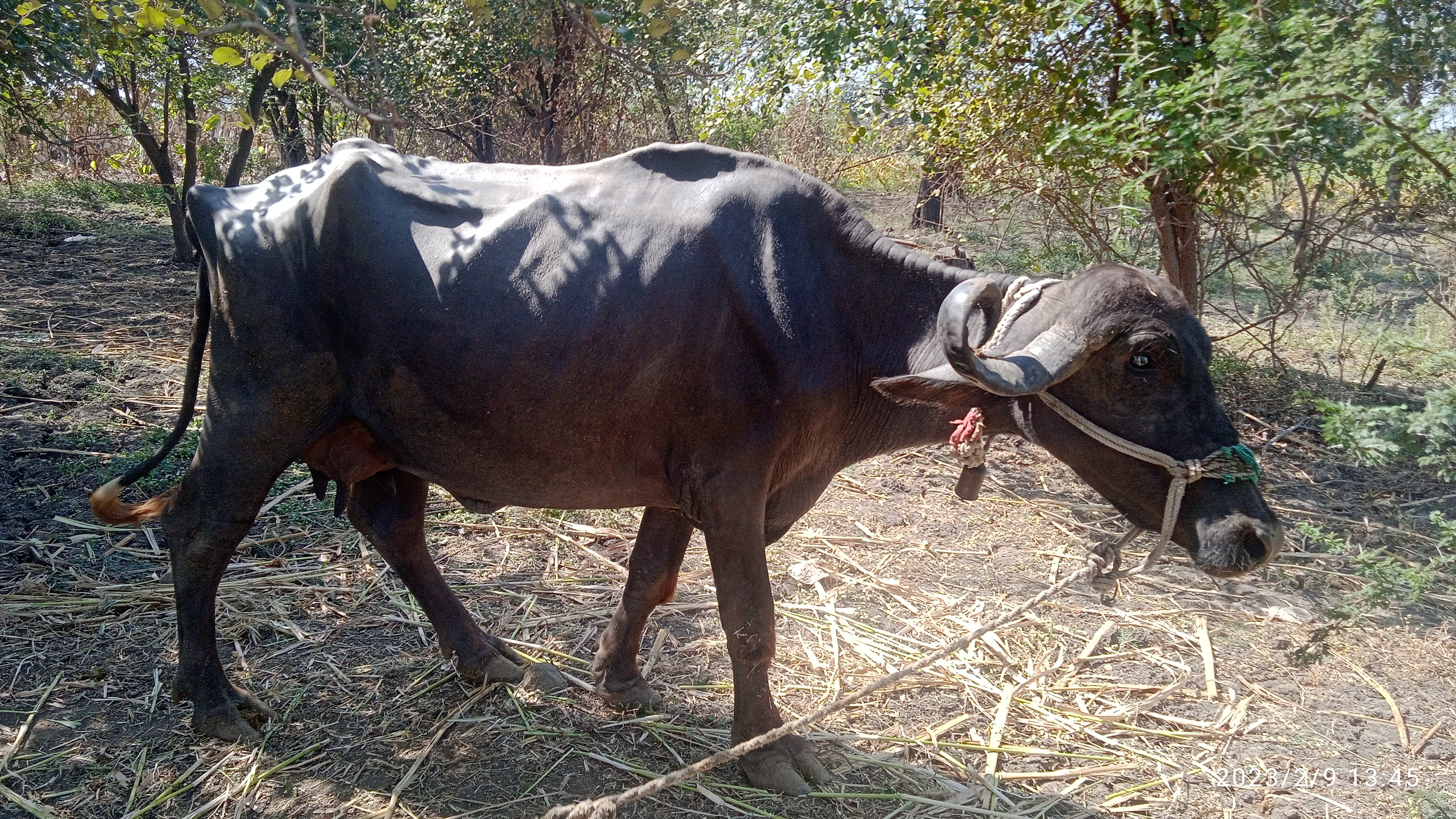
A female Jafarabadi buffalo in India.

The Jafarabadi buffalo, Jaffrabadi buffalo or Gir buffalo is a domesticated riverine buffalo that originated in Gujarat, India. The most recent estimates reveal that there are around 600,000 Jafarabadi buffaloes in the world. It is one of the important buffalo breeds of India and Pakistan. The Jafarabadi buffalo is also the first buffalo breed exported to Brazil, and is also one of the four buffalo breeds raised in Brazil as of 2017, the others being Mediterranean, Murrah and swamp buffalo.

The Indian National Scientific Documentation Centre states that the Jafarabadi buffalo is a hybrid of the African Cape buffalo and the Indian water buffalo, the former originally been brought to British India for slaughtering. The Centre notes this to be one of the major reasons for the buffalo's poor semen quality. The hybrid buffaloes were widely present in Jafarabad, and were hence named as Jafarabadi buffalo. Jafarabadi buffaloes have heavy heads with fairly large, thick, flat horns, which drop on the sides of the neck and go on upwards till the ears.

This is one of the water buffalo breeds that falls prey to Asiatic lions in the Gir Forest National Park.
