= Nili-Ravi =

Breed of domestic water buffalo

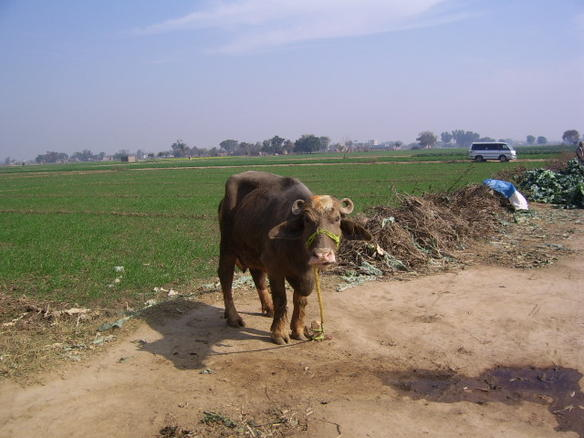
- A Nili-Ravi female in Gujrat, Pakistan
- Conservation status: FAO (2007): not at risk; DAD-IS (2025): not at risk
- Other names: Nili Ravi
- Distribution: Bangladesh; China; India; Pakistan; Philippines; Sri Lanka; Brazil; Venezuela
- Type: River
- Use: dairy

Traits
- Weight: Male: 700 kg; Female: 600 kg
- Height: Male: 135 cm; Female: 125 cm
- Coat: black or brown

The Nili-Ravi is a breed of domestic water buffalo of the Punjab region of Pakistan and India. It is similar to the Murrah breed of buffalo, and is reared mainly for dairy use. The average milk yield is approximately 2000 kg per year; the record yield is 6535 kg in a lactation of 378 days.

It is distributed mainly in the Bahawalnagar, Bahawalpur, Faizabad, Lahore, Multan, Okara, Sahiwal and Sheikhupura districts of the Pakistani Punjab and the Amritsar, Firozpur and Gurdaspur districts of the Indian Punjab.

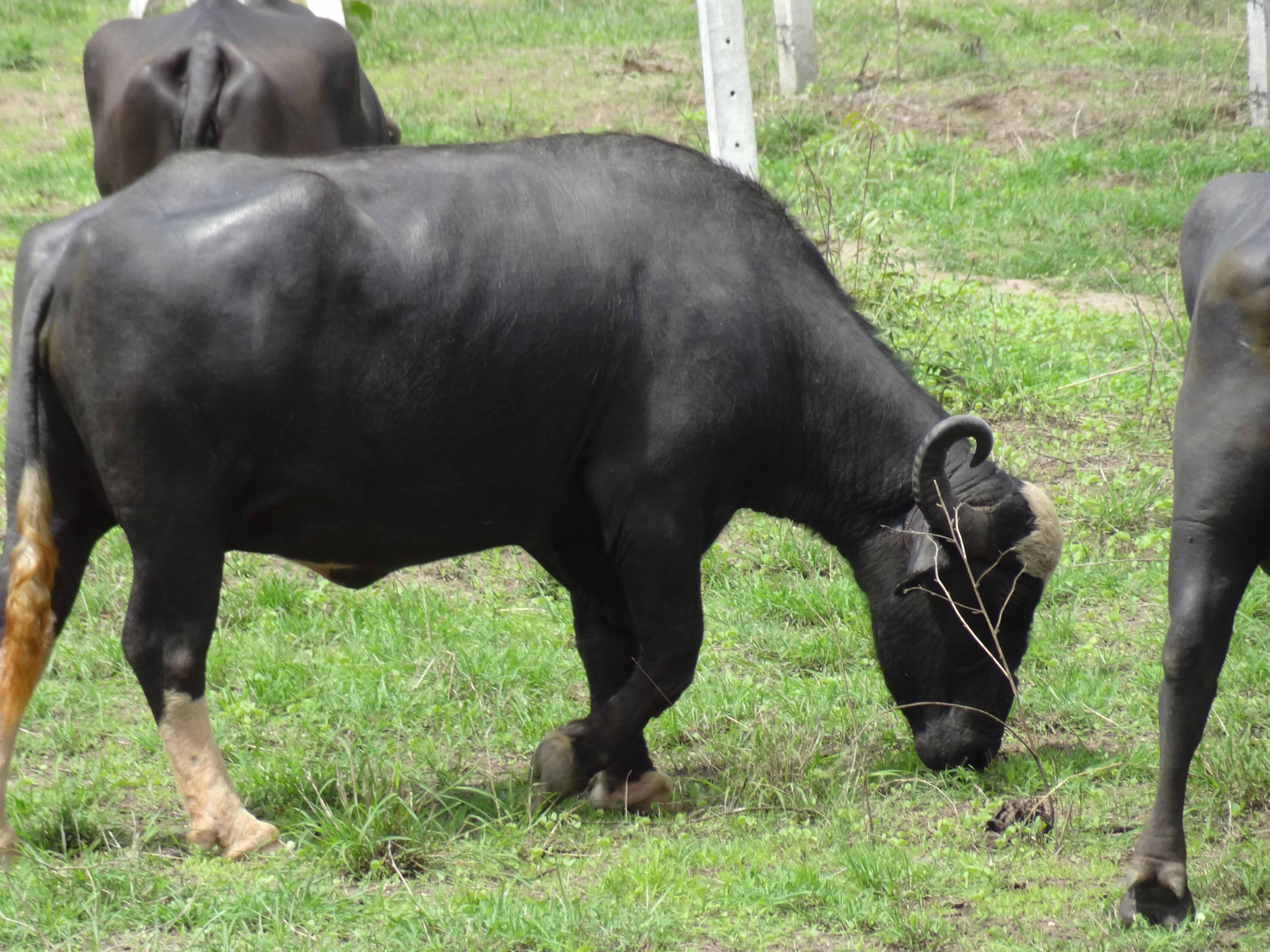
A Nili-Ravi female in Maharashtra
