= Murrah buffalo =

Indian breed of water buffalo

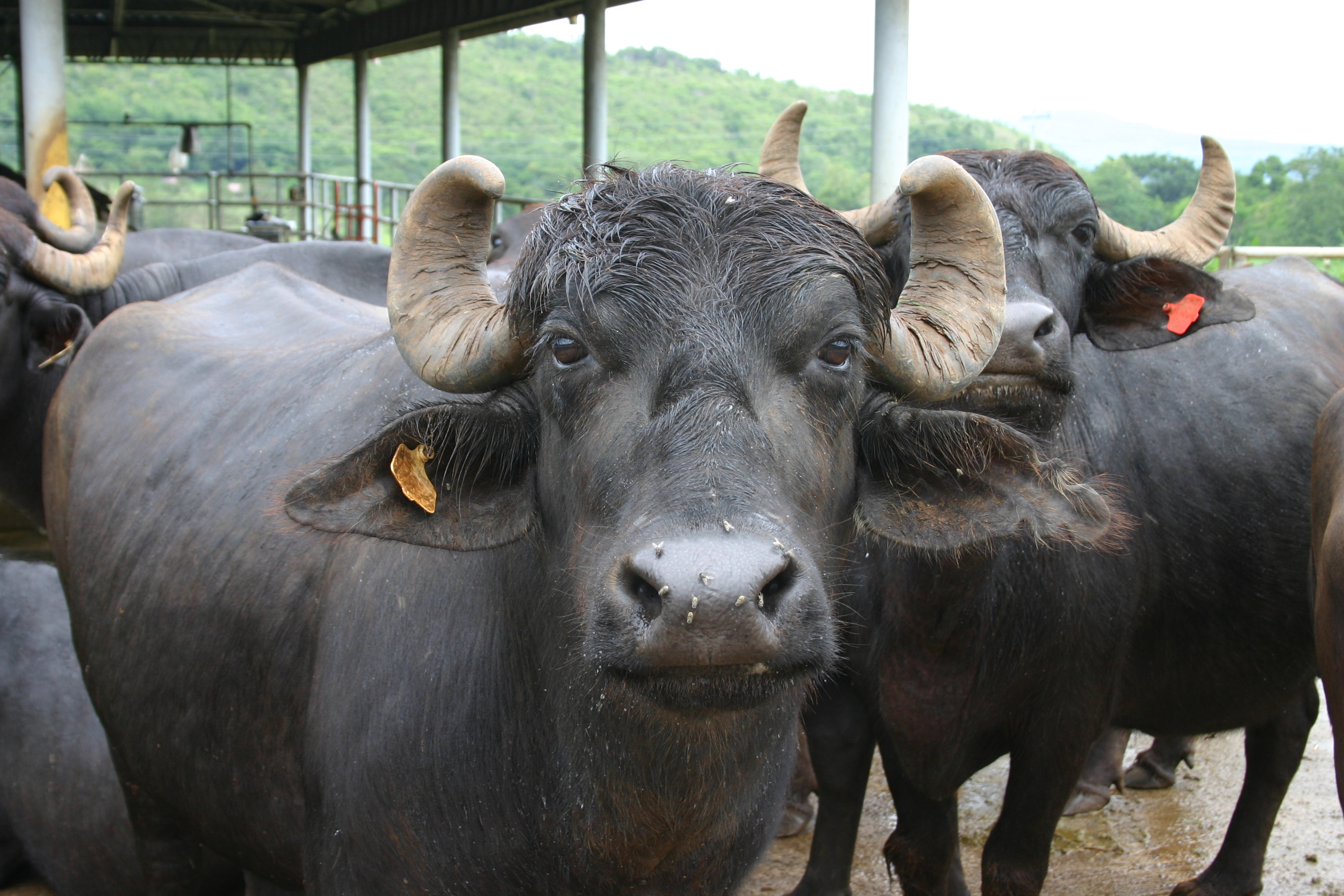
- Murrah buffaloes in the Philippine Carabao Center (PCC) at its Central Mindanao University facility in Maramag, Bukidnon
- Conservation status: Domesticated
- Country of origin: India
- Distribution: Azerbaijan, Brazil, Bulgaria, Colombia, China, Ecuador, Guatemala, Indonesia, Laos, Pakistan, Malaysia, Nepal, Philippines, Romania, Sri Lanka, Viet Nam, Venezuela
- Use: Dairy

Traits
- Weight: Male: 750 kg; Female: 650 kg
- Height: Male: 4.9 foot ca. 142 cm; Female: 4.7 foot ca. 133 cm
- Coat: Black

The Murrah buffalo is a breed of water buffalo (Bubalus bubalis) mainly kept for milk production. It originates in Haryana of India , According to the ICAR-National Bureau of Animal Genetic Resources, the official home tract of the breed is within central haryana, where it is kept in the districts of Bhiwani, Agra, Hisar, Rohtak, Jind, Jhajhar, Fatehabad, Gurgaon and the capital region of Delhi. It has been used to improve the milk production of dairy buffalo in other countries, such as Italy, Bulgaria and Egypt. A Murrah buffalo at the Lakshmi Dairy Farm in Punjab set a record of 26.335 kg (58.06 lb) of milk in the 2016 National Livestock Competition and Expo. In Brazil, this breed of buffalo is used for production of both meat and milk. Murrahs sell for a high price.

Among Indian buffalo breeds, Murrah is noted to have the highest milk yield.

== Appearance ==
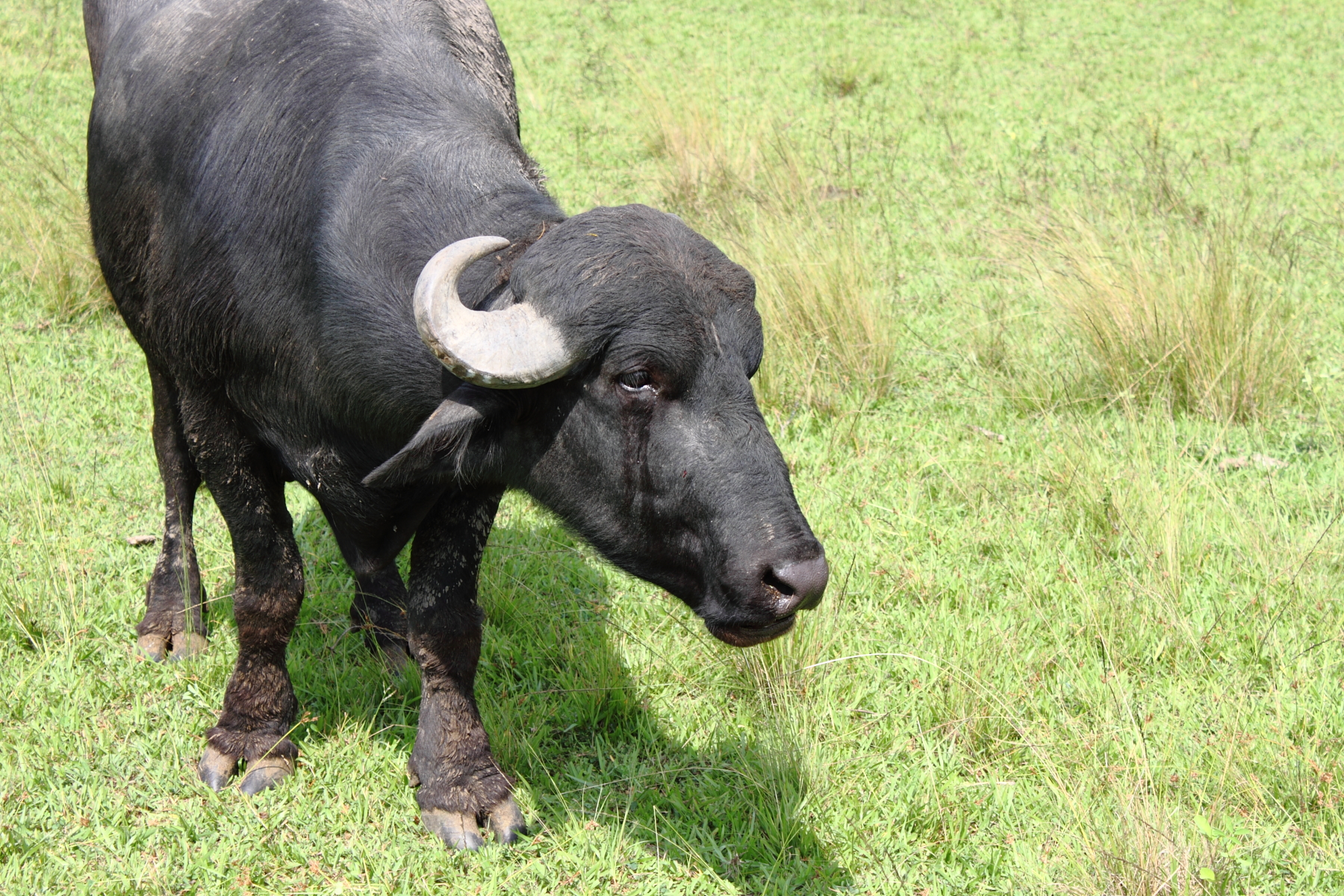
Murrah buffalo on a Brazilian farm

Murrah buffaloes are jet black in colour, sometimes with white markings on the face or legs. Their eyes are black, active, and prominent in females, but slightly shrunken in males and should not be walled, i.e., the cornea should not have whiteness. Their necks are long and thin in females and thick and massive in males. Their ears are short, thin, and alert.

They typically have short and tightly curved horns. Bulls weigh around 550 kg (1,210 lb) and cows around 450 kg (990 lb). Average milk production is 2,200 L (480 imp gal; 580 US gal) in a lactation period of 310 days.

== Research institutes ==
These institutes have ongoing research programs to enhance and disseminate the Murrah breed:

- The Central Institute for Research on Buffaloes in Hisar is the premier research institute in India for improving the Murrah buffalo breed and for disseminating Murrah buffalo semen to farmers and buffalo breeders for fertilization of cows. It has cloned a Murrah buffalo to replicate the high quality breed.
- National Dairy Research Institute is an agro-dairy university in Karnal.
- The Philippine Carabao Center in the Philippines breeds Murrah buffaloes for adapting them to the local tropical conditions.

== Export to other nations ==
In Asia, Murrah buffaloes were first introduced in the Philippines from India in 1917 to cross breed with native Carabao breed. A few Nili-Ravi breed were also exported from India to the Philippines. Philippine Carabao Center was established in 1992 at Science City of Muñoz in Nueva Ecija province to breed and cross carabao based on high-yield Murrah buffalo in the Philippines as a multi-purpose animal that can be raised for milk, meat, hide, and draft. This project has now expected to more than 14 buffalo research centers, based on murrah breed, spread across the Philippines.

In Europe, the native breed were crossbred with the Indian Murrah breed in Bulgaria, and later in Romania, some were crossbred with Bulgarian Murrah.

In South America, starting from late 19th century Murrah & Jaffarabadi breeds were imported by Brazil to improve the breed there.

== See also ==
- List of water buffalo breeds
- List of Indian cattle breeds
- Indian Agricultural Research Institute (IARI)
- Government Livestock Farm, Hisar, research and dissemination institute to improve the feed for cattle to enhance the milk yield, situated next to the CIRB Hisar
