= Surti buffalo =

Breed of buffalo

Surti
- Other names: Deccani; Gujarati; Nadiadi; Surati
- Country of origin: India
- Distribution: Gujarat: Anand, Kaira and Baroda districts
- Use: Dairy

Traits
- Weight: Male: average 499 kg (1100 lb); Female: average 408 kg (899 lb)
- Height: Male: c. 130 cm (5.1 ft); Female: c. 125 cm (4.92 ft)
- Coat: rusty brown or silver-grey

The Surti is a breed of water buffalo found in the Kaira and Vadodara districts of Gujarat between the Mahi and Sabarmati rivers. Its average milk yield is 1,600–1,800 litres (350–400 imp gal; 420–480 US gal). The fat content of the milk is about 8–10 per cent. The best animals of this breed are found in Anand, Kaira and Baroda districts of Gujarat.

Sickle shape horn is its characteristic feature.

== Characteristics of the breed ==
The Surti buffalo is of medium size and docile temperament. The breed has got a fairly broad and long head with a convex shape at the top in between horns. Horns are sickle-shaped and flat which grow in a downward & backward direction and then upwards at the tip forming a hook. The skin is black or brown. Surti breed has a unique straight back. Good specimens have two white collars.

== Performance of the breed ==
Average milk production:-

- Ist Lactation:-1500-1600 kg
- Other than Ist Lactation:- 1900–2000 kg

Fat:- 7 to 7.5%

SNF:- 9 to 9.15%

Age at Ist calving:- 45 to 47 months

Calving interval:- 400 to 425 days

Breeding period:- Seasonal (Sept. to April)
