= List of water buffalo cheeses =

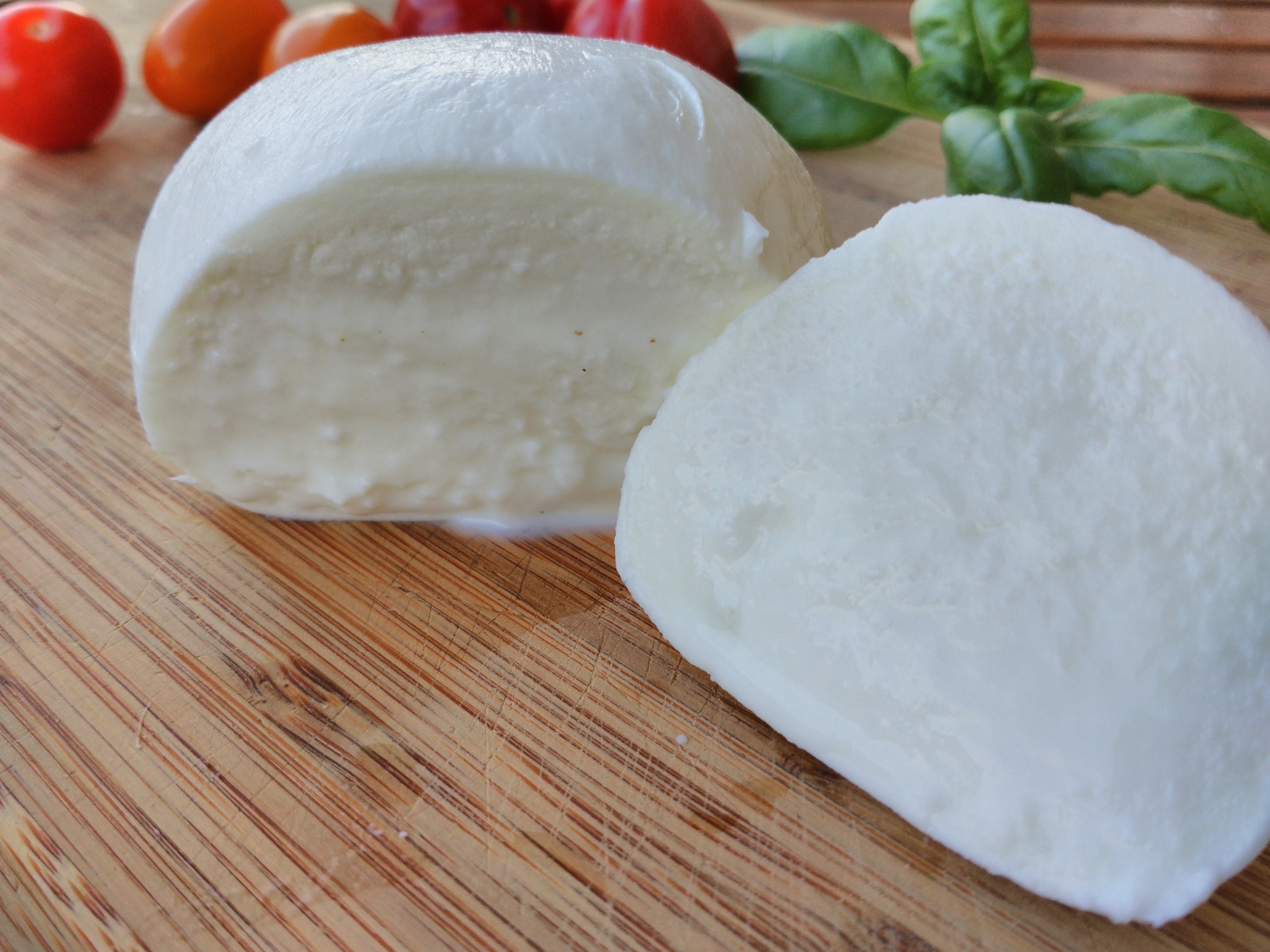
Buffalo mozzarella

This is a list of notable water buffalo cheeses. Water buffalo cheese is produced using the milk from the water buffalo. Some buffalo milk cheeses are produced using the milk from other animals as well, such as cow's milk.

== Water buffalo cheeses ==
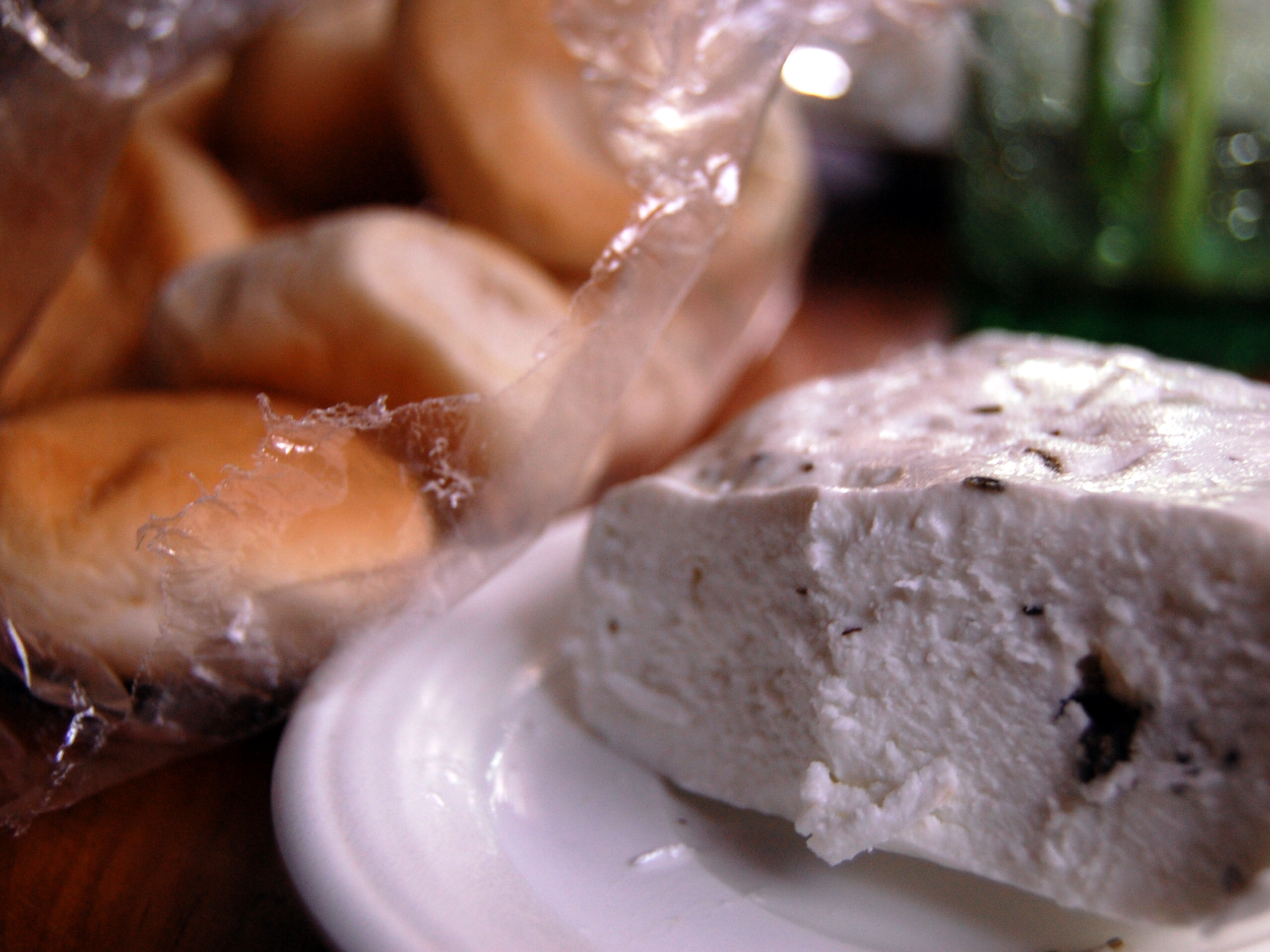
Kesong puti with bread

- Bagot ni horbo, dali ni horbo, or simply dali – a cheese-like traditional Batak dish from Tapanuli, North Sumatra, Indonesia, with a yellowish white appearance with tofu-like texture and milky flavor. Dali is made by boiling buffalo milk coagulated with papaya leaf or unripe pineapple juice.
- Buffalo mozzarella – a mozzarella made from the milk of Italian Mediterranean buffalo by the pasta filata method. It is traditionally manufactured in Campania, Italy, especially in the provinces of Caserta and Salerno. Mozzarella di bufala campana received a Traditional Specialities Guaranteed certification from the European Union in 1998.

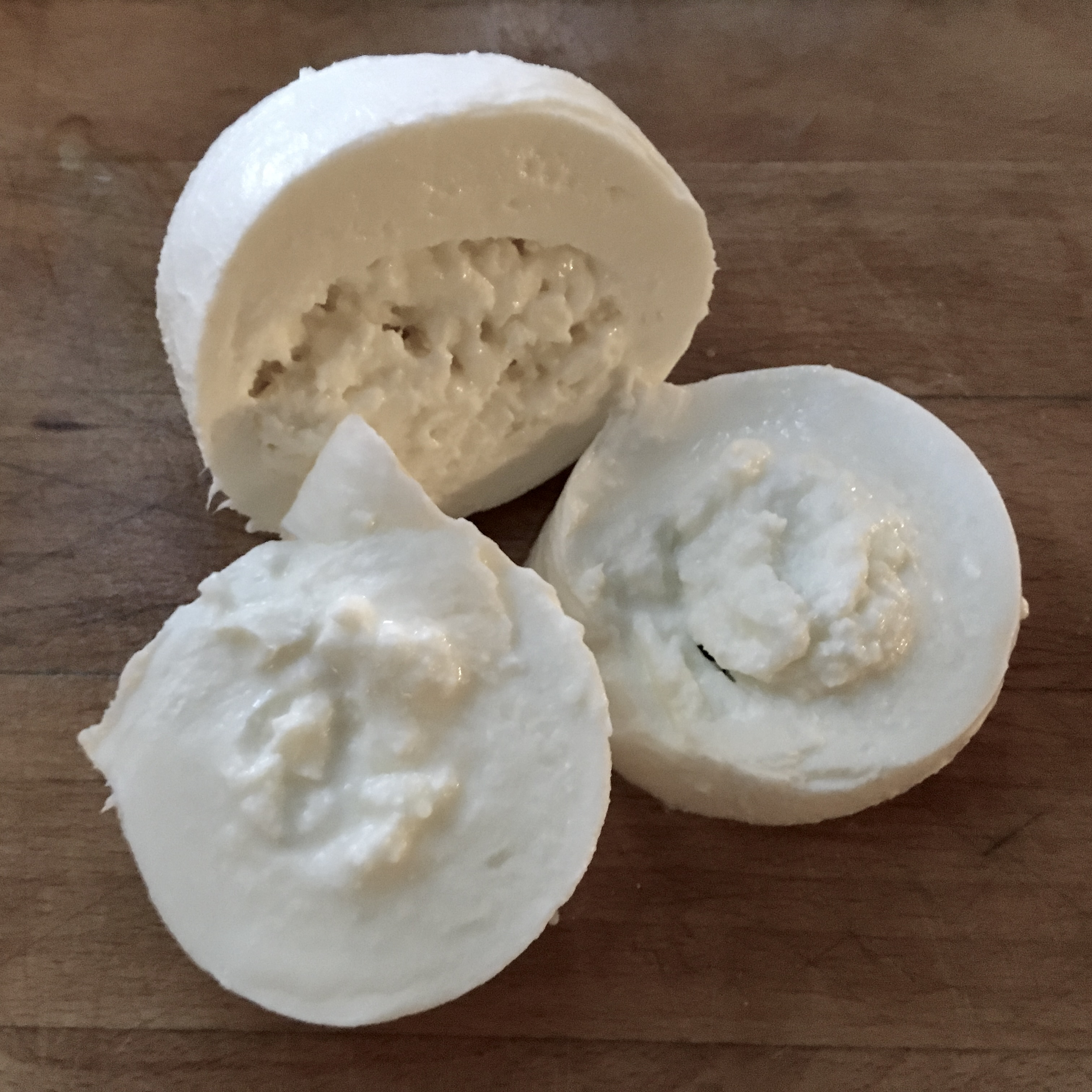
Burrata di bufala

- Burrata di bufala – a fresh Italian buffalo milk cheese prepared using the pasta filata method.
- Caciotta – a range of types of cheese produced especially in the central regions of Italy from the milk of cows, sheep, goats or water buffalo
- Casatica – a sweet rinded log-shaped cheese produced in Northern Italy.
- Dangke – a type of cheese produced in South Sulawesi, Indonesia, especially in Enrekang, Baraka, Anggeraja, and Alla districts. Dangke is processed by boiling fresh buffalo milk with sliced papaya leaves, stems, or unripe papaya fruits. Dangke is typically soaked in a brine solution overnight before being wrapped with banana leaves to mask the bitter taste caused by the addition of papaya leaves.
- Domiati – a soft white salty cheese made primarily in Egypt, but also in Sudan and other Middle Eastern countries. Typically made from buffalo milk, cow milk, or a mixture, it can also be made from other milks, such as sheep, goat or camel milk.
- Kesong puti – a Filipino soft, unaged, white cheese made from unskimmed carabao's milk, salt, and rennet.
- Khoa – a dairy product widely used in the cuisine of the Indian subcontinent, it is made using both cow's and water buffalo milk.
- Litsusu and cologanti – a type of cheese produced in East and West Nusa Tenggara, Indonesia, with enzymes from litsusu tree as coagulant.
- Nguri – a buffalo milk cheese of the Fujian province in China; it is prepared in a ball shape approximately the size of a table tennis ball, and has a soft, leathery texture.
- Provatura – a traditionally Lazian dairy product made from Italian buffalo milk by the pasta filata method.
- Rumi cheese – made from cow milk or buffalo milk.
- Stracciatella di bufala – produced from Italian buffalo milk in the Province of Foggia, located in the southern Italian region of Apulia. It is prepared using a stretching (pasta filata) and a shredding technique.
- Surti paneer – a soft cheese associated with Surat in India, it is a type of paneer prepared from buffalo milk which is coagulated using rennet.

== See also ==
- List of cheeses
- List of dairy products
- Lists of prepared foods
