= New Market, Kolkata =

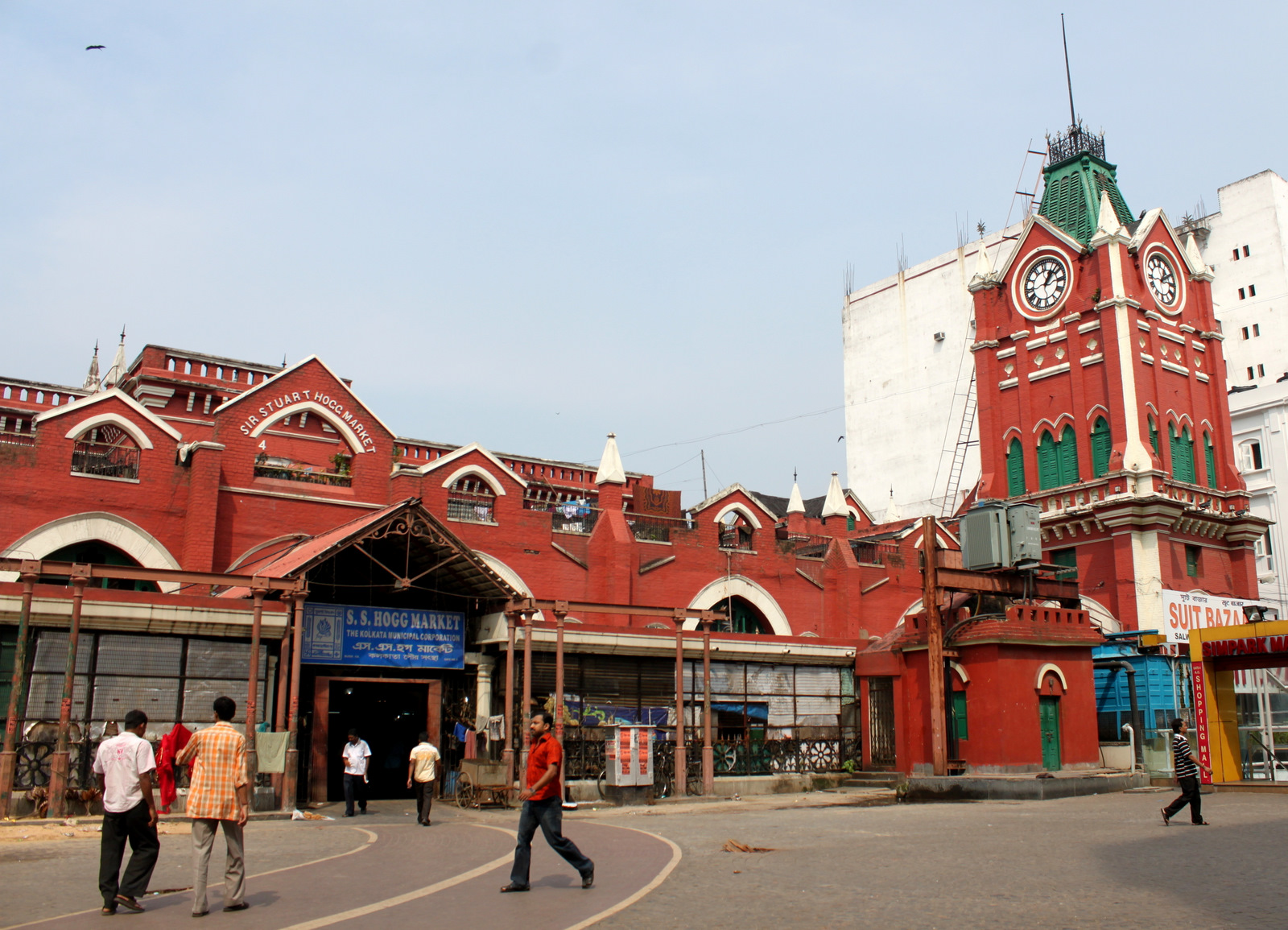
- New Market Entrance at Lindsey Street
- Location: Esplanade, Kolkata, India
- Coordinates: 22.5603°N 88.3531°E
- Address: Lindsay Street
- Opened: 1 January 1874; 152 years ago
- Developer: Mackintosh Burn & Co
- Owner: Kolkata Municipal Corporation
- Architect: Richard Roskell Bayne
- Num. of stores: 2,000
- Floors: 1

New Market, formally known as Sir Stuart Hogg Market, is a market complex in Kolkata situated on Lindsay Street at Dharmatala. Although primarily "New Market" referred to the original enclosed market, but in local parlance, the entire shopping area along with the market complex is known as "New Market".

== History ==
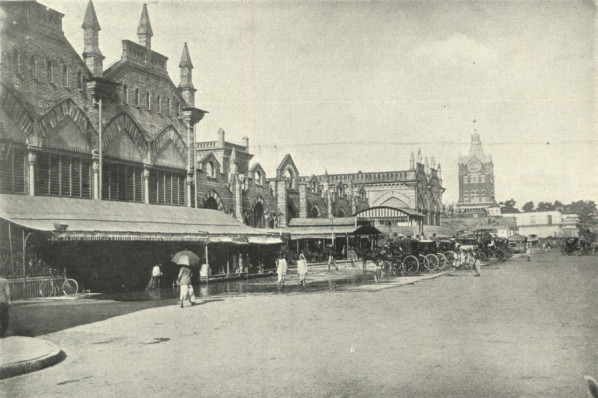
Sir Stuart Hogg Market, c. 1905

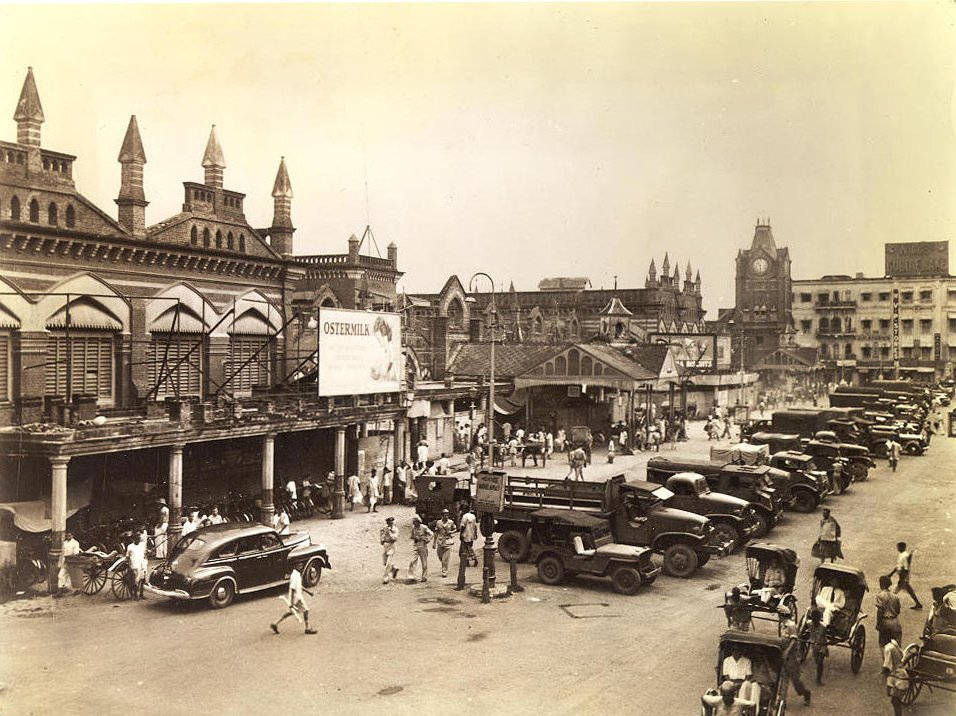
New Market, c. 1945

Some of the earliest English quarters of Calcutta were in an area known then as Dalhousie Square. Terretti and Lalbazar nearby were the customary shopping haunts of the British. Later settlements arose in Kashaitola, Dharmatala and Chowringhee. By the 1850s, British colonists held sway in Calcutta and displayed increasing contempt for the "natives" and an aversion to brushing shoulders with them at the bazaars. In 1871, moved by a well orchestrated outcry from English residents, a committee of the Calcutta Corporation began to contemplate a market which would be the preserve of Calcutta's British residents. Spurred by the committee's deliberations, the Corporation purchased Lindsay Street, made plans to raze the old Fenwick's Bazar located there, and commissioned Richard Roskell Bayne, an architect of the East Indian Railway Company, to design the Victorian Gothic market complex which would take its place. It began to take shape in 1873, and Bayne was honoured for his achievement with a Rs. 1,000 rupee award, a large sum in the 1870s. Mackintosh Burn was the builder.

The giant shopping arcade was thrown open to the English populace with some fanfare on 1 January 1874. News of Calcutta's first municipal market spread rapidly. Affluent colonials from all over India shopped at exclusive retailers like Ranken and Company (dressmakers), Cuthbertson and Harper (shoe-merchants) and R.W. Newman or Thacker Spink, the famous stationers and book-dealers.

Sir Stuart Hogg, then the Chairman of Calcutta Corporation, had shown tenacious support for the plans to build the New Market. So, 28 years later, on 2 December 1903, the market was officially named Sir Stuart Hogg Market and later shortened to Hogg Market. Bengali society, in the British era, called it Hogg Shaheber Bajaar, a name that is still in use, just as a painting of Sir Stuart Hogg still hangs in Calcutta Corporation's portrait gallery. But the earliest provisional nickname, New Market, which remained in use throughout, proved to have the most sticking power.

New Market's growth kept pace with the city until World War II. The northern portion of the market came up in 1909 at an expense of 6 lakh rupees. Despite the gathering storm of World War II, an extension was engineered on the south flank, and the historic clock tower on the southern end of the market was shipped over from Huddersfield and installed in the 1930s. Florists were located near the front entrance, and stalls selling fresh and preserved foods were placed towards the rear of the market. Beyond the vegetable stalls, fishmongers and slaughterhouse butchers plied their trade, and, until the mid-1970s, at the very back of the market, exotic animals from all over the British Empire could be bought as pets.

== Description ==
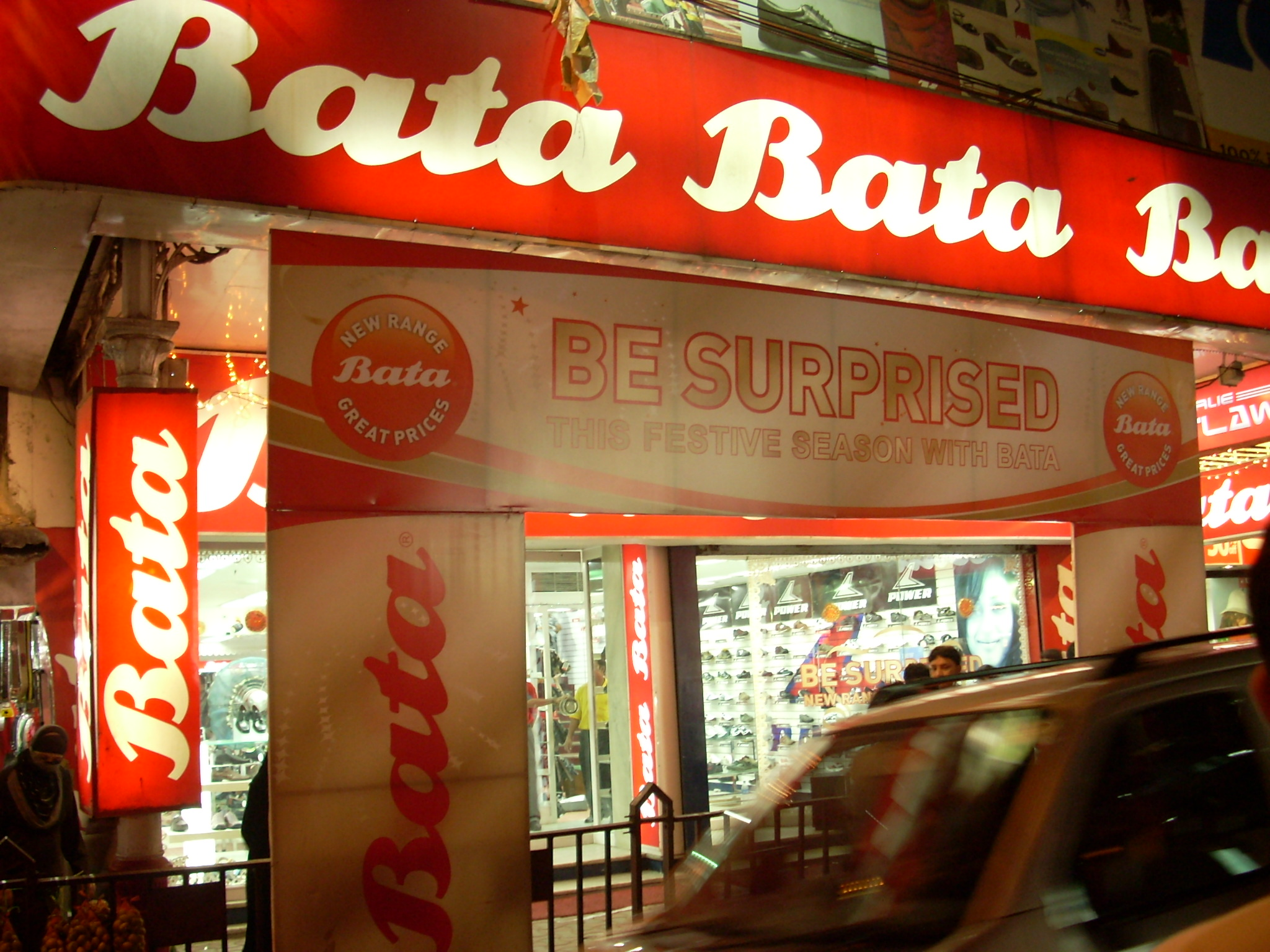
Bata Shoe Store in Linsday Street, near the market

Despite the appearance of air-conditioned, American-style, shopping malls all over Kolkata, New Market, which has survived two devastating fires and regular flooding, remains at the core of the shopping experience in the city.

Over 2000 stalls sell everything from clothing to wheeled luggage to electronics to cheese. Newmarket sells garments & accessories, flowers, different food items including raw meat, fish, vegetables and fruits and spices. There are crockeries and utensil stores. It also has a florist section dealing with exotic flowers. It is situated on Lindsay Street, Kolkata (Calcutta), just off Chowringhee Road, the market is open 10 a.m. until 8 p.m. Monday to Friday, until 7 p.m. on Saturdays, and closed on Sundays.

=== Food stores ===
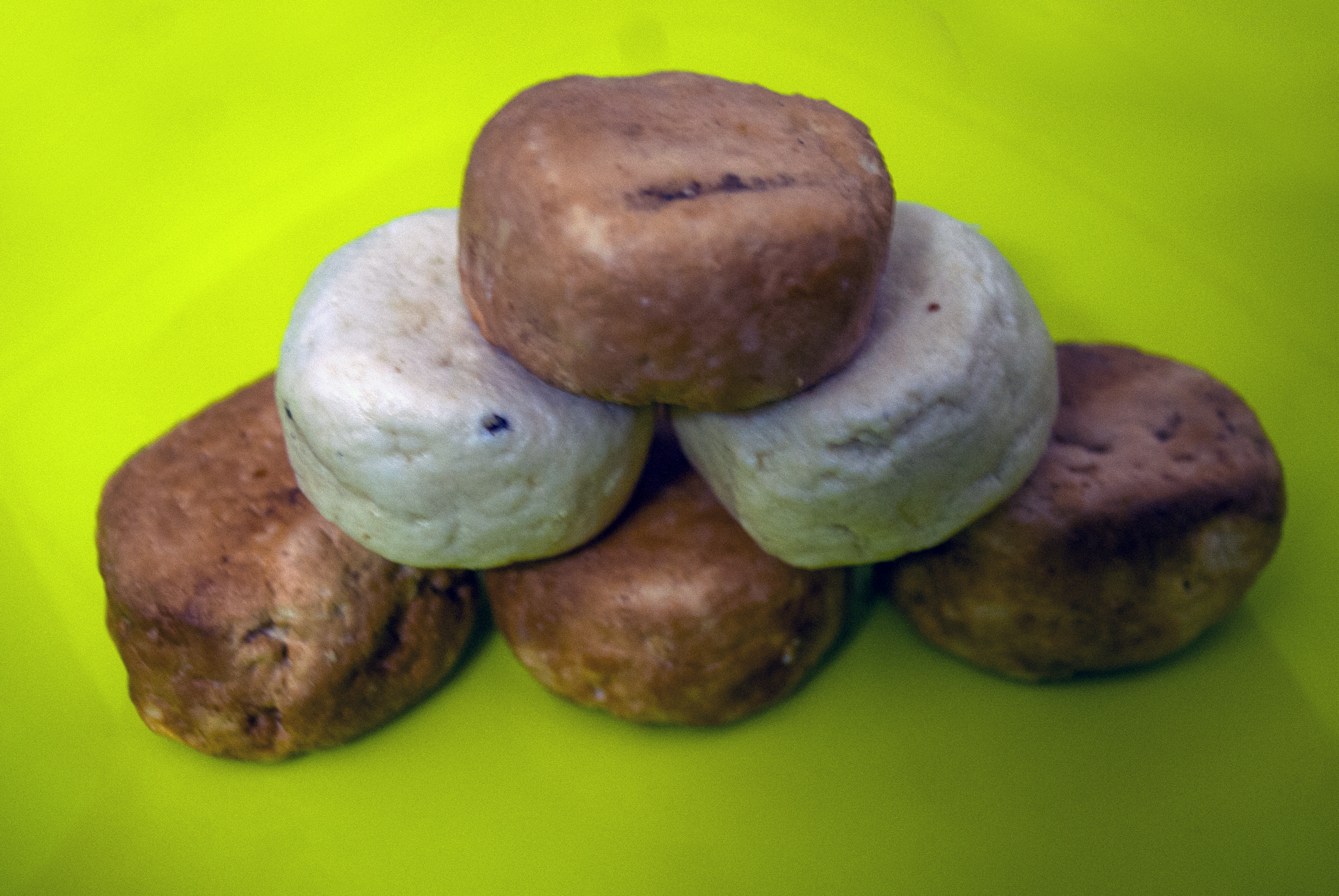
Bandel Cheese, Plain (White) & Brown (Smoked)

There are several renowned confectioners in New Market: Nahoum & Sons (estd. 1902) is historic, with its original mahogany cabinetry and marble counters. For over a century, a large number of customers have sworn by Nahoum's Fruit Cake, its brownies, marzipan, macaroons and much more. Imperial Confectioners and D Gama compete for a close second and third place.

Kalimpong Cheese and Bandel Cheese are local cheese available only in New Market. Kalimpong Cheese comes from the North Bengal tourist spot of Kalimpong, it can be crumbled into salad or eaten raw. Bandel Cheese is an Asian cheese originated in an erstwhile Portuguese colony, Bandel located in eastern India. It is an indigenous unripened, salted soft variety of cheese made in perforated pots. It is similar to Surti paneer but made from cow's milk. Available in two varieties, plain (white) and smoked (brown). Bandel cheese is well salted and can be stored.

=== Garments and accessories stores ===
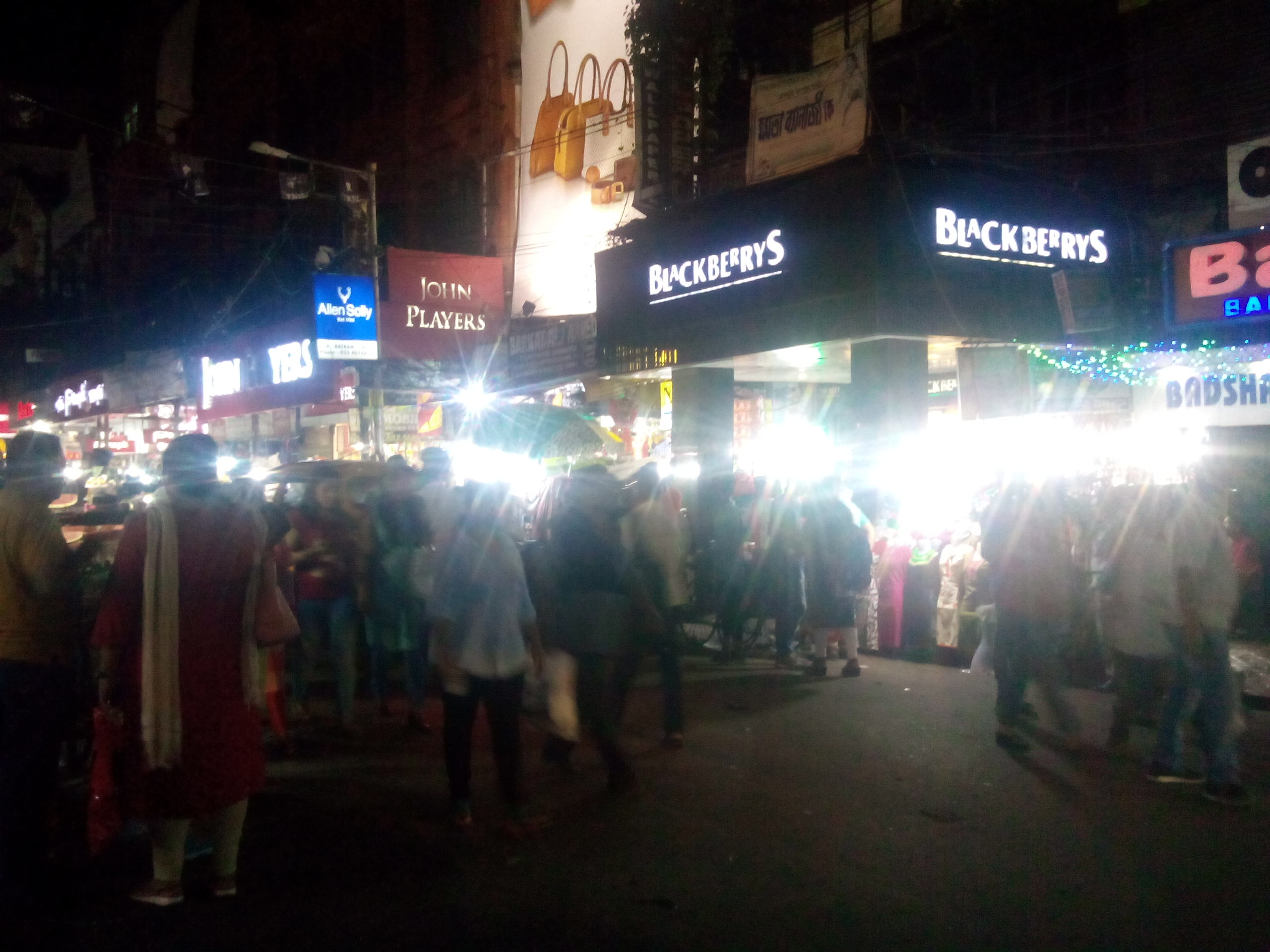
New market Garments and accessories stores

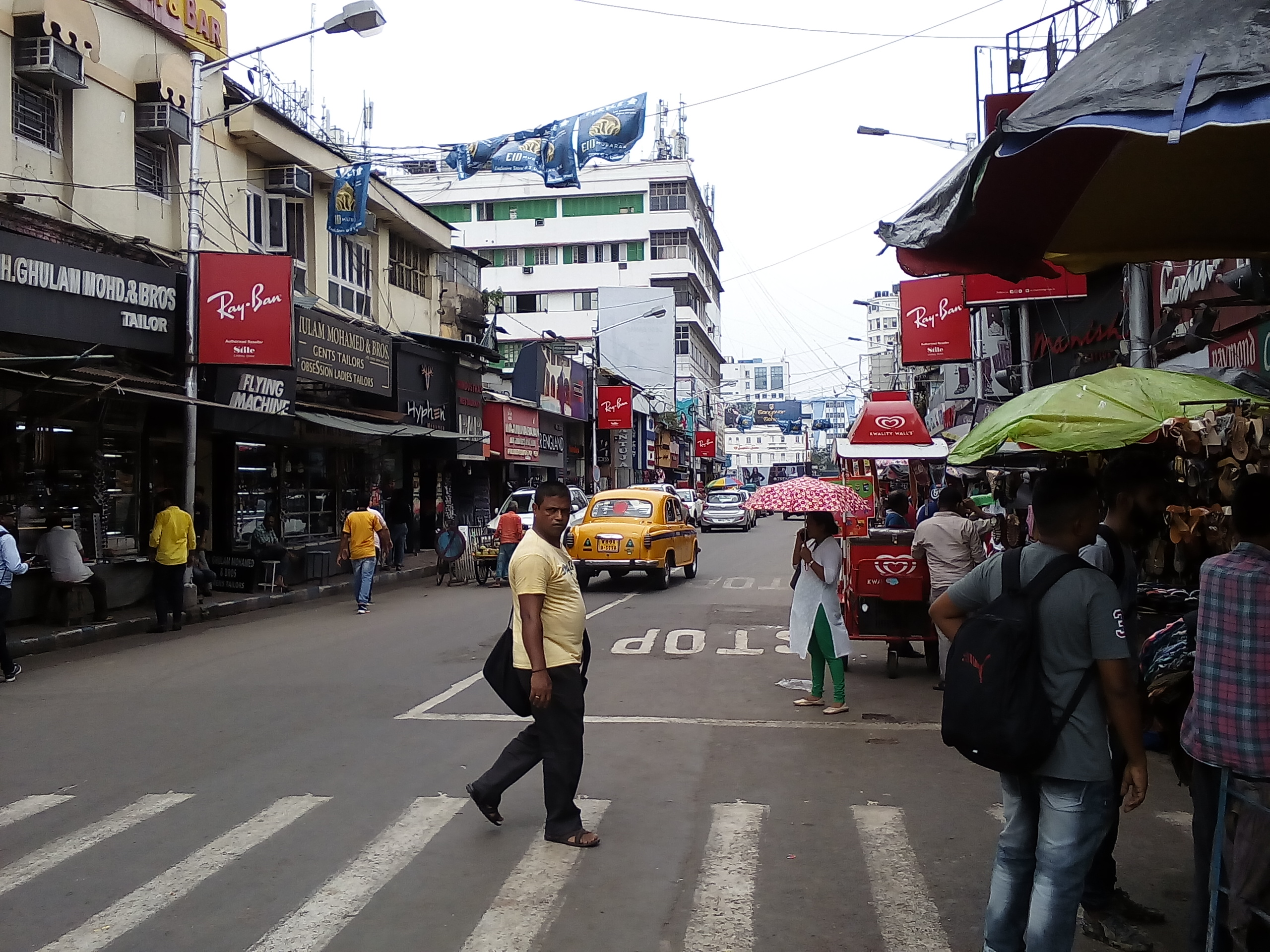
Lindsay Street

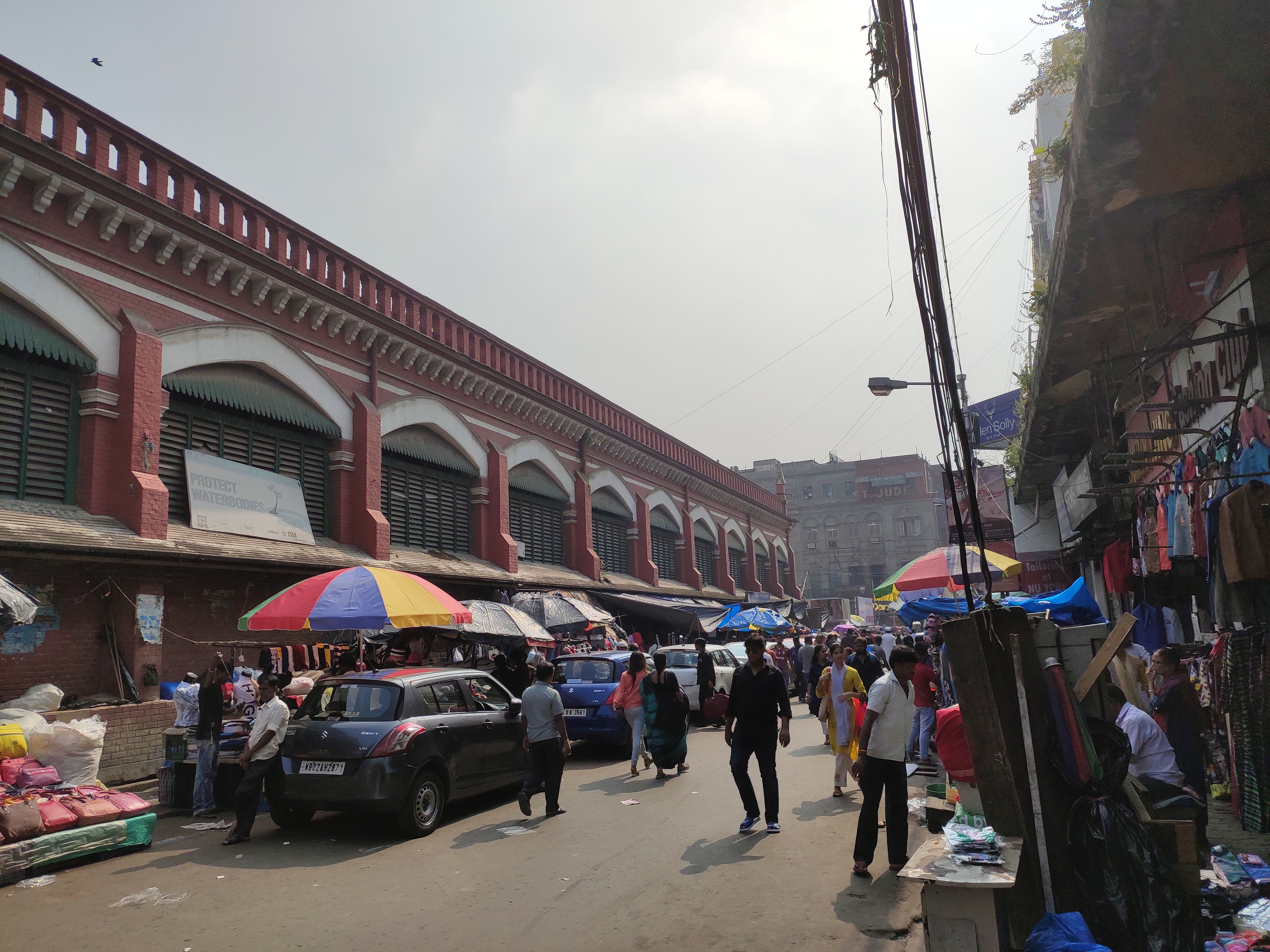
Bertram Street

New market (New complex) houses a world reputed 97 years old store "PUMPOSH" ..Kashmir Shawl Emporium, selling art and craft from Kashmir.

== Incidents ==
New Market witnessed two major fires, one on 13 December 1985 and the other one on 20 July 2011. There was also another massive fire on 18 May 2015.
