= Dangke =

Indonesian traditional cheese

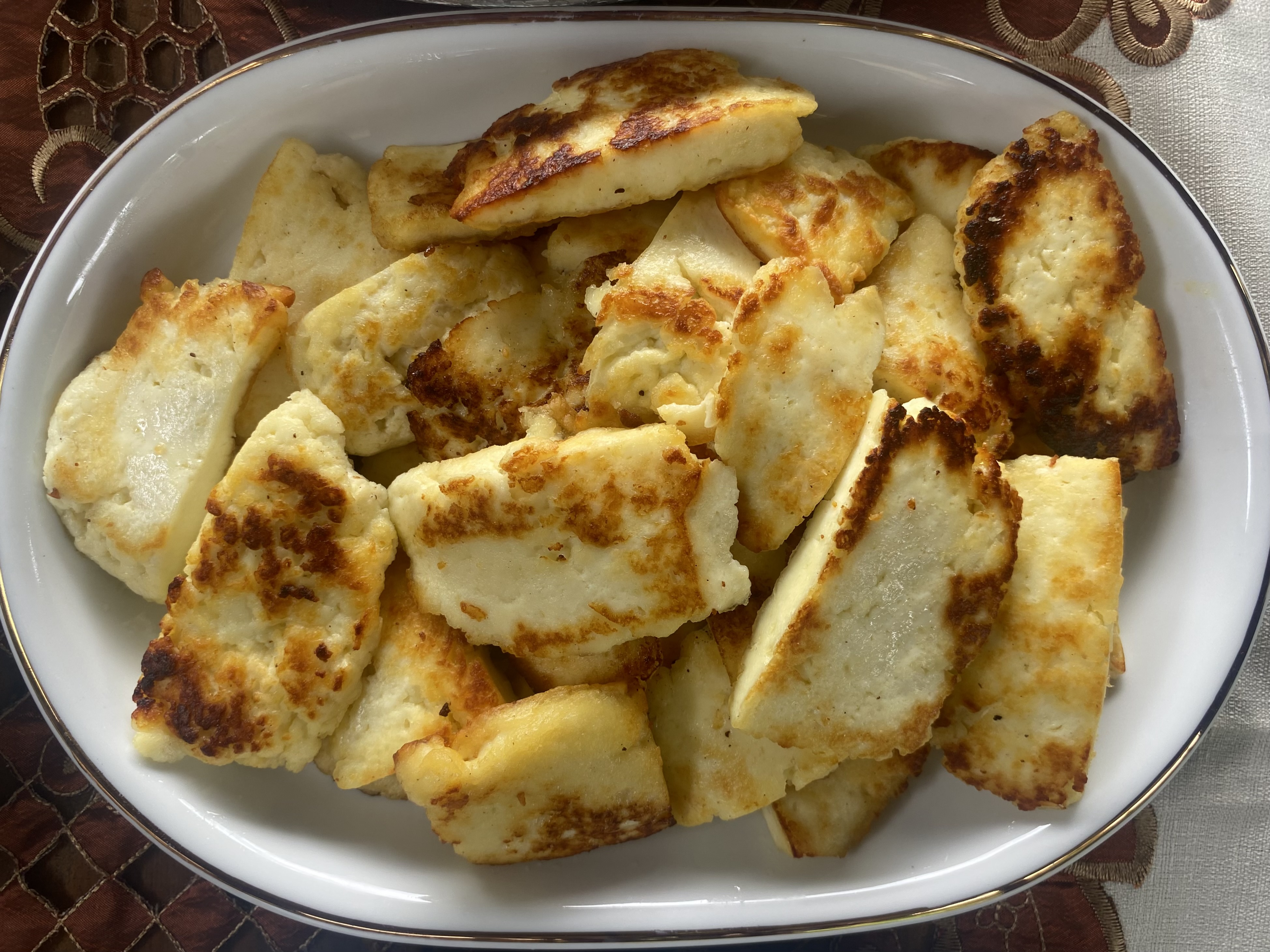
- Fried dangke served in a plate
- Place of origin: Indonesia
- Region or state: South Sulawesi
- Main ingredients: Water buffalo and cow milk

Dangke
- Country of origin: Indonesia
- Region: South Sulawesi
- Source of milk: Water buffalo and cow milk
- Texture: Soft

Dangke is a type of cottage cheese produced in Enrekang, South Sulawesi, Indonesia, especially in Enrekang, Baraka, Anggeraja, and Alla districts. Dangke is processed by boiling fresh cattle or buffalo milk with sliced papaya leaves, stems, or unripe papaya fruits. Dangke is typically soaked in a brine solution overnight before being wrapped with banana leaves for masking the bitter taste caused by the addition of papaya leaves.

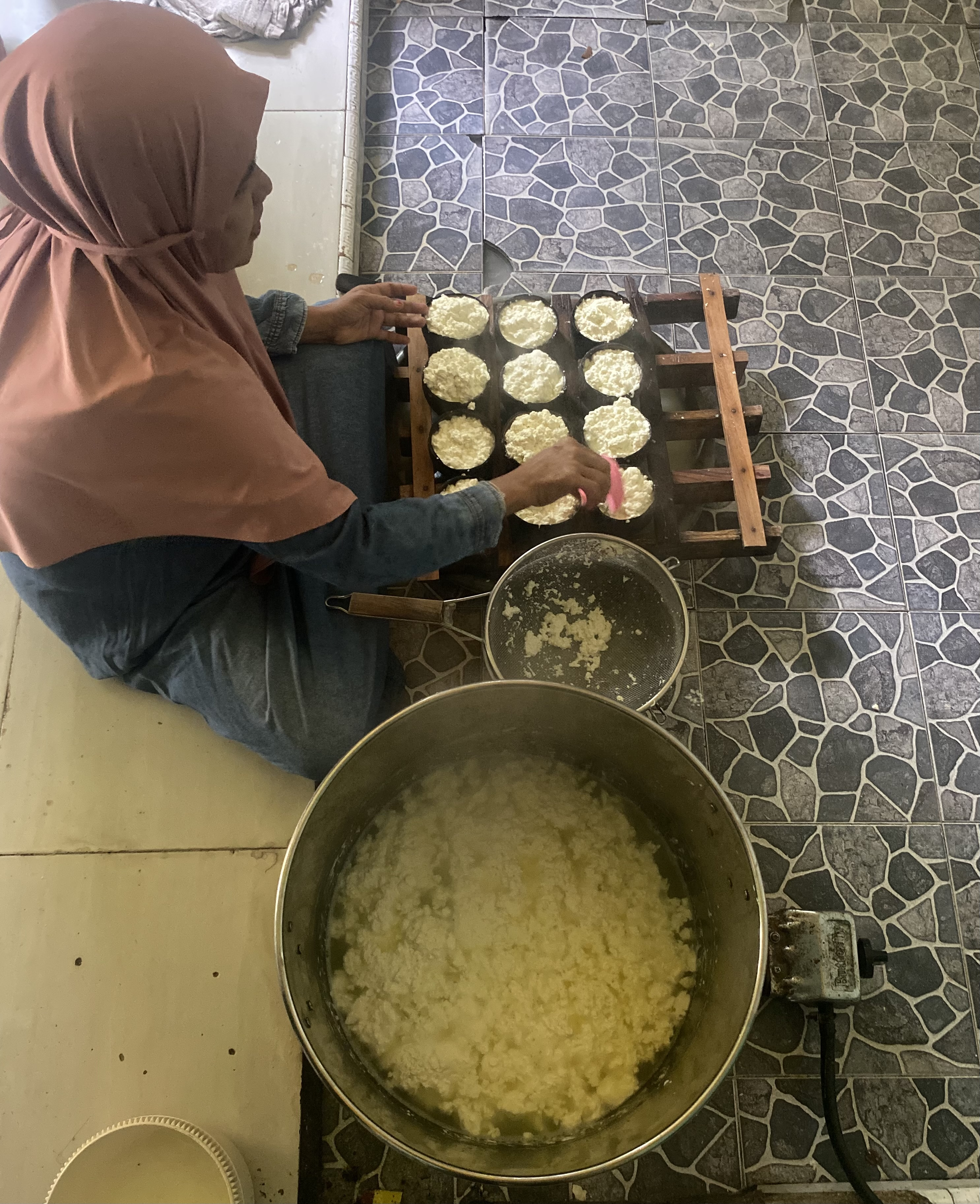
Dangke making process by boiling a mixture of cow's milk and papaya tree sap

Dangke can be served directly as a high-protein side dish or processed into other food variations such as grilled dangke, stir-fried dangke, dangke crackers and others.

== See also ==
- List of cheeses
- List of water buffalo cheeses
- List of dairy products
- List of Indonesian dishes

Other Indonesian cheeses:

- Dali ni horbo
- Edam
- Gouda
- Litsusu cologanti
