= Kalimpong cheese =

Cheese made in Kalimpong, in the Indian state of West Bengal

- Country of origin: India
- Region: East India, West Bengal
- Town: Kalimpong
- Source of milk: Cows
- Pasteurised: No
- Texture: Slightly crumbly on the inside, smooth rind
- Dimensions: Circular
- Weight: 1 kg and 12 kg

Kalimpong cheese is made in and named after Kalimpong, a hill station in the Indian state of West Bengal. When unripe, Kalimpong cheese is a little like a rustic Welsh Caerphilly: white, slightly acidic and a little crumbly in the centre with a relatively smooth (edible) rind that is yellowy on the inside, with a bit of a tang and not particularly strong-smelling.

Kalimpong cheese making was started by Father Andre Butty, a Jesuit parish priest in Kalimpong. It is still made in 12 kg and 1 kg wheels and is produced in limited quantities, like Gouda. While production of the nearby region Sikkim's Gouda has been taken over by Amul, a small amount of the local variety by Pappu Dairy Co-op, which shut down wholesale production a few years ago, is available occasionally. Kalimpong cheese and some variety of mozzarella is produced by Dairy Makarios Bous, Kalimpong (only 10 kg (22 lb) are made each day) in Kolkata's New Market.

If left to ripen for a few months in a refrigerator for a few months, the flavour of Kalimpong cheese slightly matures, and there is a change in coloration and increased moulding on the rind.

It can be eaten by itself, or with grapes and crackers, or melted in a cheese, ham and mustard toast. It can be crumbled into salads or eaten on its own with Guava cheese or Aam papad.

== See also ==
- Bandel cheese – Cheese that originated in the erstwhile Portuguese colony Bandel in eastern India
- Paneer – Type of fresh cheese in South Asian cuisine
- Chhena – Type of cheese curds originating in India
- Khoa – Indian dairy food
