= Stracciatella (cheese) =

Italian cheese

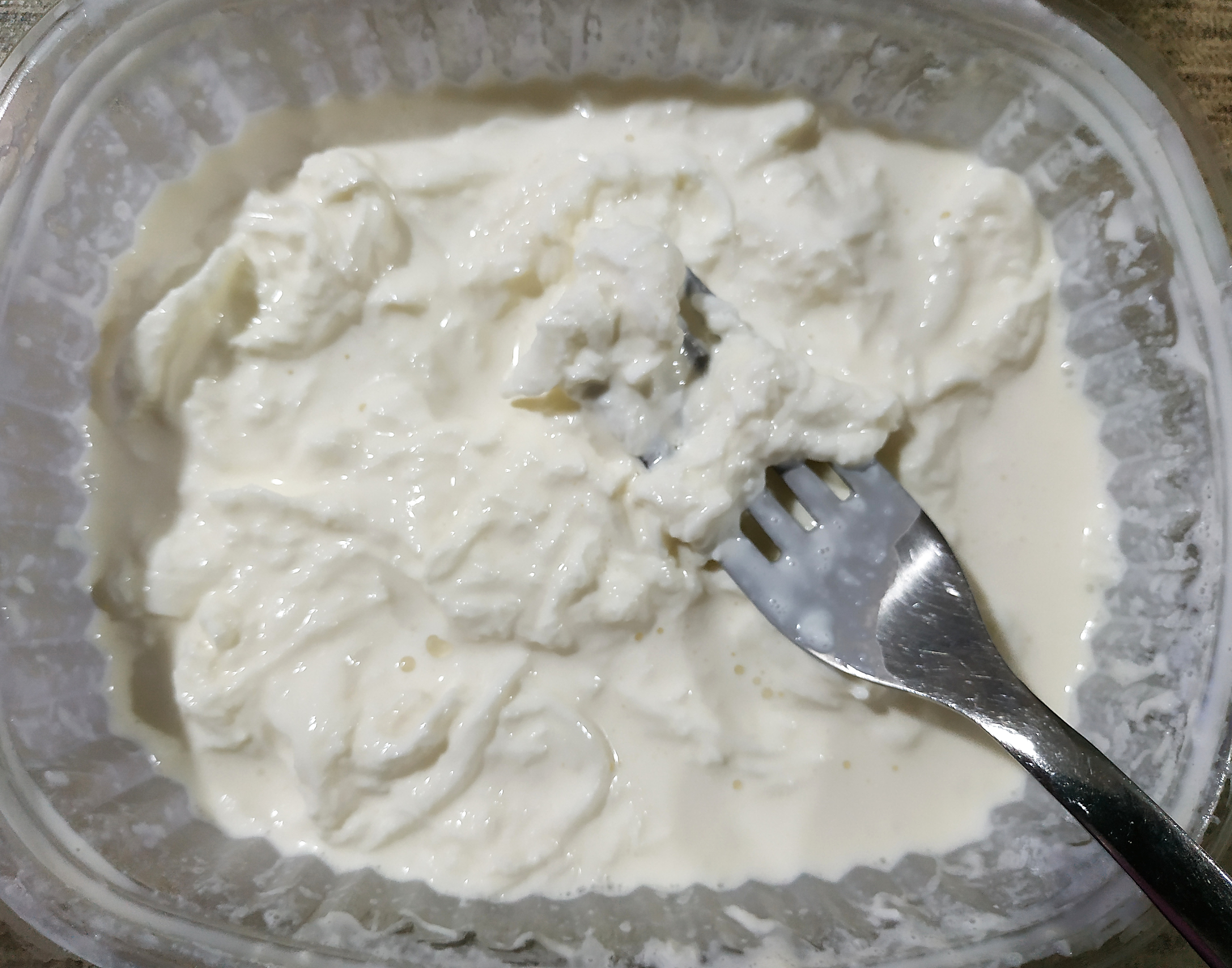
- Country of origin: Italy
- Region: Apulia
- Source of milk: Cow or Italian Mediterranean buffalo

Stracciatella (Italian: [strattʃaˈtɛlla]) is a fresh cheese originating from Apulia, Italy, made by shredding stretched curd (pasta filata) and, traditionally, mixing it with cream. It may be produced from either cow's milk or Italian buffalo milk, depending on the mozzarella used.

== Description ==
Stracciatella cheese is composed of small shreds—hence its name, which in Italian is a diminutive of straccia ('rag' or 'shred'), meaning 'a little shred'. It is a stretched curd fresh cheese, white in colour, and made the whole year round, but is thought to be at its best during the spring and summer months.

When produced from Italian buffalo milk, it is sometimes referred to as stracciatella di bufala. Buffalo herds and the cheeses made from their milk are much more common on the western side of the Apennines, in Lazio and Campania.

When mixed with thick cream, stracciatella forms the filling of burrata: this is a rich, buttery textured cheese, which comes enclosed in a bag of mozzarella and is thought to have been originally created in the early 20th century in Andria, on the Murgia plateau. It is also now made outside Italy, especially in the United States and Argentina. Since neither stracciatella nor burrata keep well even when refrigerated, these cheeses need to be consumed promptly, while they are still soft and fresh.

== See also ==
- Stracciatella (ice cream)
- Stracciatella (soup)
- List of Italian cheeses
- List of water buffalo cheeses
- List of stretch-curd cheeses
