= Burrata =

Italian cheese

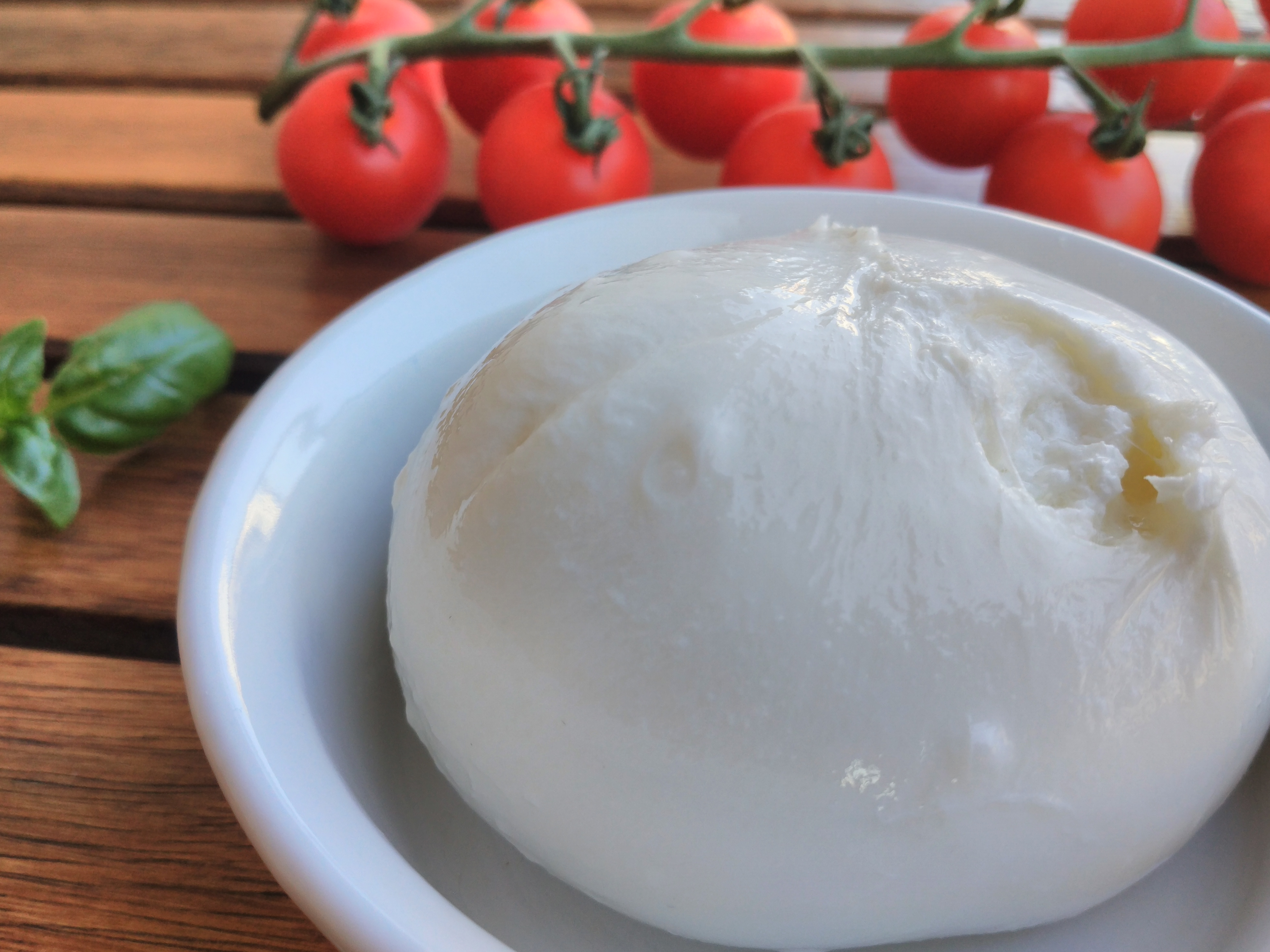
- Country of origin: Italy
- Region: Puglia
- Town: Andria
- Source of milk: Cow

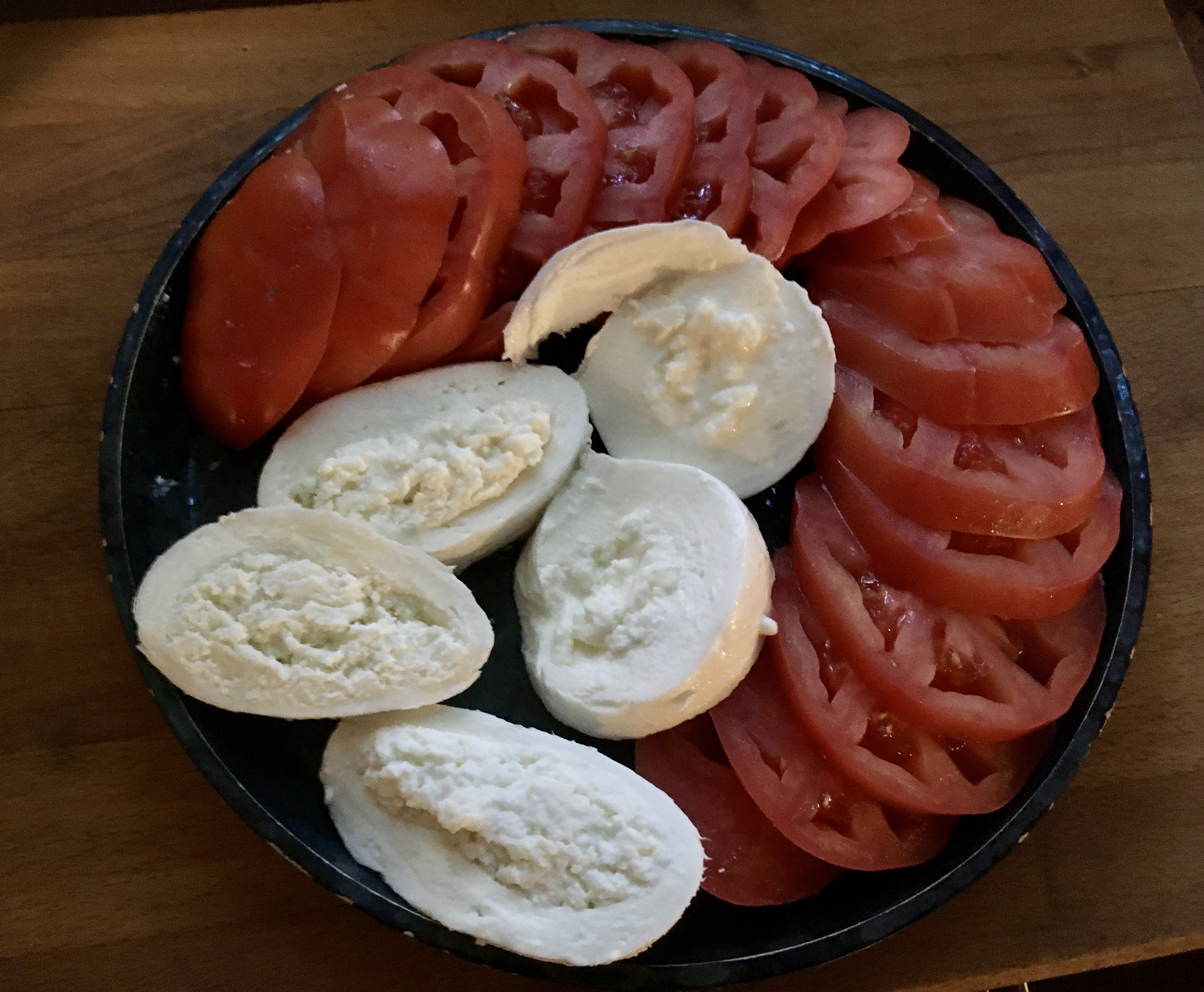
Burrata di bufala with sliced tomatoes

Burrata (Italian: [burˈrata]) is an Italian cow's milk (occasionally buffalo milk) cheese made from mozzarella and cream.

Burrata has its origins in the Apulia region of Italy. The dish was born out of a need to minimise food waste in the 1920s.

The outer casing is solid cheese, while the inside contains stracciatella and clotted cream, giving it an unusual, soft texture. It is a speciality of the Puglia region of southern Italy.

== History ==
Burrata is a dairy product of Murgia, in Puglia in southern Italy. It is produced from cow's milk, rennet, and cream, and may have origins dating back to about 1900, produced at the Bianchino brothers' (Lorenzo and Vincenzo) farm in the town of Andria. More recent records have shown that Lorenzo Bianchino, of the Piana Padura farm, first developed the product in 1956.

In November 2016, burrata di Andria became a protected geographical indication (PGI) product. To qualify as burrata di Andria all operations, from the processing of the raw materials up to the production of the finished product, must take place in the defined geographical area of the region of Puglia.

Established as an artisanal cheese, burrata maintained its premium-product status even after it began to be made commercially in factories throughout Puglia.

== Production ==
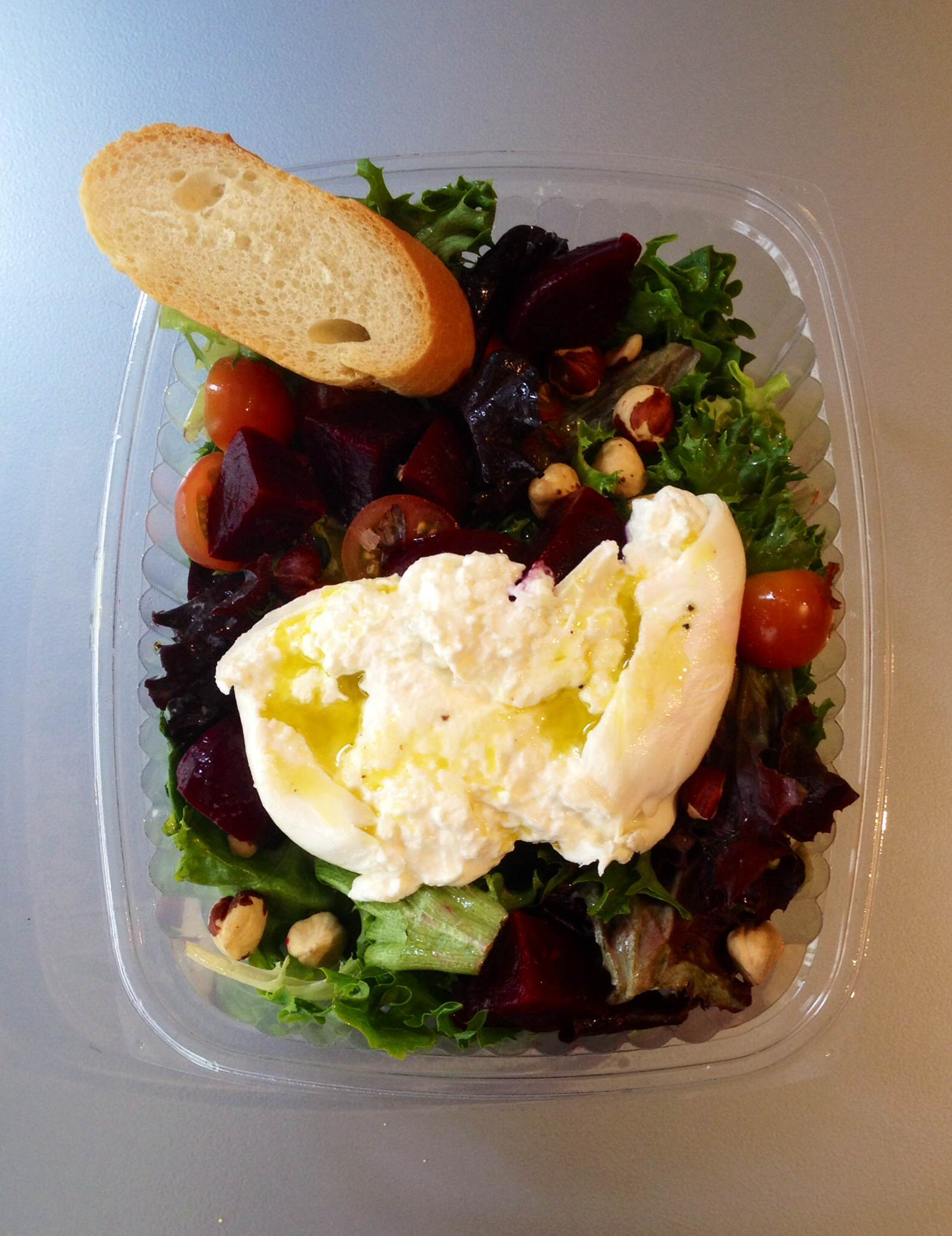
Burrata with the casing broken on a salad

Burrata starts out much like mozzarella and many other cheeses, with rennet used to curdle the warm milk. Unlike other cheeses, however, the fresh mozzarella curds are plunged into hot whey or lightly salted water, kneaded, and pulled to develop stretchy strings (pasta filata), then shaped.

When making burrata, the still-hot cheese is formed into a pouch, which is then filled with the scraps of leftover mozzarella and topped off with fresh cream before closing. The finished burrata is traditionally wrapped in the leaves of asphodel, tied to form a brioche-like topknot, and moistened with whey.

As burrata does not keep well, even when refrigerated, it is advisable to use it promptly while it is still fresh.

== See also ==
- List of Italian cheeses
- List of water buffalo cheeses
