= Provatura =

Italian fresh cheese

Provatura (pl.: provature) or provatura romana is a fresh Italian cheese from the Lazio region of Italy made from cow's milk or buffalo milk by the pasta filata method. It is similar to mozzarella and provola.

== Etymology ==
The name derives from the fact that the cheese is made from the prova (lit. 'test'), which is the part of the cheese mass used to test the quality of the pasta filata. It is ovoid or round in shape, about the size of an egg, so much so that in ancient recipes a portion is often described as a "provatura egg".

== History ==
The first mention of this cheese is found in a 12th-century document kept in the bishop's archives of Capua. The document, a medieval chronicle, states that the monks of the monastery of St. Lorenzo ad Septimum near Aversa offered the faithful a mozza or provatura with some bread on the feast of the patron saint.

An antipasto with provatura is described in La singolare dottrina, a gastronomic work by Domenico Romoli, a work known as "Panunto" or Il Panunto, published in 1560.

The cheese has often been confused with mozzarella, as in a medical work of the Schola Medica Salernitana, published several times in the 16th century, where it is said that with buffalo milk "one makes those balls tied with rushes that are called mozze here and provature in Rome".

According to Antonio Frugoli, a gastronome from Lucca who lived in the 17th century, author of the treatise Pratica e Scalcaria, mozzarella and provatura are two different cheeses. In his work, which was published in two editions in 1631 and 1638, Frugoli devotes two different chapters to mozzarella and provatura (entitled respectively Ravaggiuolo, buffalo eggs and mozzarella, and their qualities in cooking, and Large and small provature, and their qualities in cooking) in the fourth book of the work, which is dedicated, among others, to dairy products. Frugoli's description shows that this cheese can be fresh or matured, and that it has a lower water content and a higher amount of salt and rennet than mozzarella. Because of this, according to Frugoli, who followed the humoral theory, provatura lacks the therapeutic properties that he instead acknowledges in mozzarella.

As Ada Boni's classic Roman cookery manual La Cucina Romana shows, still in the early 20th century, provatura played in the Italian capital's cuisine the role that mozzarella plays today.

== Usage ==
Besides being eaten raw, in traditional Roman cuisine provatura is an ingredient of several typical dishes, such as crostini di provatura e alici and supplì.

== See also ==
- List of Italian cheeses
- List of water buffalo cheeses

== Sources ==
- Boni, Ada (1983) [1930]. La Cucina Romana (in Italian). Roma: Newton Compton Editori.
- Faccioli, Emilio (1987). L'Arte della cucina in Italia (in Italian). Milano: Einaudi.
