= Nguri =

Buffalo milk cheese of Fujian, China

Nguri (Chinese: 牛乳; pinyin: niúrǔ; lit. "bovine milk") is a buffalo's milk cheese of Fujian province, China. It is in a ball-shape approximately the size of a table tennis ball and has a soft, leathery texture. It is made by shaping with a cheese cloth the mixture of milk and vinegar that has been marinated in a salty brine. It is served as a condiment to plain rice congee. A small bite of this condiment could complement a large mouthful of plain congee, as it is very salty.

It is also sometimes referred to as Giam-ngu-ring (simplified Chinese: 咸牛奶; traditional Chinese: 鹹牛奶; pinyin: xiánniúnǎi; lit. "salty milk"), and is said to originate from the town of Jiaomei in Zhangzhou, Fujian.

== See also ==
- Fujian cuisine
- List of cheeses
- List of water buffalo cheeses
