= Nahoum & Sons =

Bakery in Kolkata, India

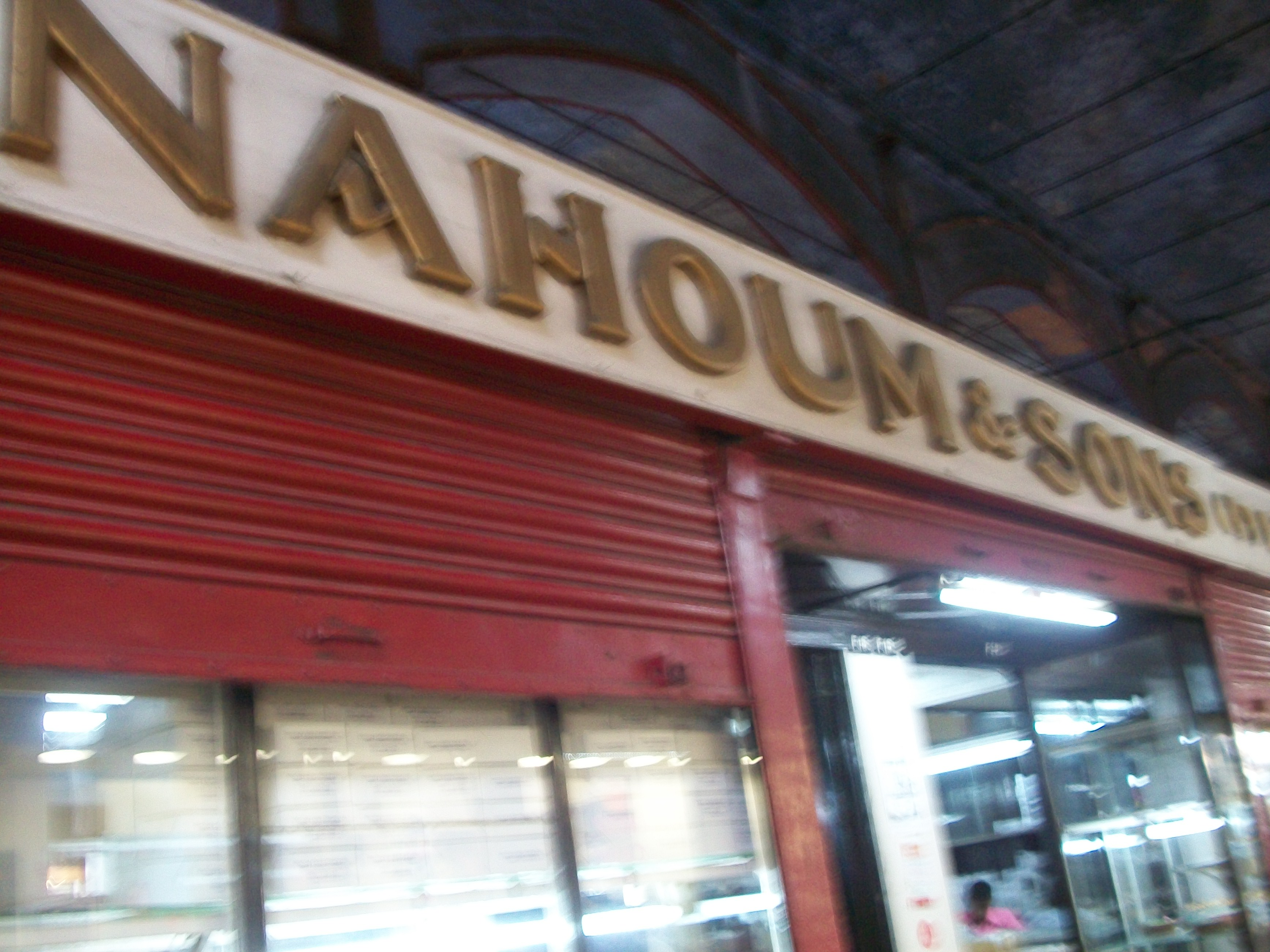
- Formation: 1902
- Type: Bakery
- Location: F-20, New Market, Kolkata, India
- Coordinates: 22.5602866°N 88.3530294°E

Nahoum & Sons Pvt. Limited (Bengali: নাহুম অ্যান্ড সন্স প্রাইভেট লিমিটেড) is an Indian bakery shop situated in West Bengal. It is one of the oldest surviving shops in Kolkata owned by the Jewish family. The products of Nahoum & Sons at Christmas are a part of the culture of Kolkata. Various famous personalities of India have eaten from this bakery.

== History ==
Nahoum Israel Mordecai was a Baghdadi Jew who was the founder of the shop. It was founded 26 years after the establishment of New Market in the city. The Hog Market could be seen from the front of the shop. He changed the location of the shop 14 years after the establishment of the bakery. His son Elias took the responsibility of the shop from second generation. After his death in 1964 his son David Nahoum from third generation of the family took up the responsibility to manage the shop. His brothers Norman and Solomon had the responsibility of store at various times. After death of David in 2013, his brother Issac took the responsibility.

== Ownership ==
- First generation: Nahoum Israel Mordecai
- Second generation: Elias Nahoum
- Third generation: Norman Elias Nahoum, Solomon Elias Nahoum, David Elias Nahoum (1964–2013), Issac Elias Nahoum (2013–present)

== Products ==
Nahoum & Sons offers:

- Biscuit
- Egg chap
- Pantras
- Macron cake
- Brownie cake
- Fragrant marzipan-fudge cake
- Plain cake Madeira
- Honey Light plum cake
- Royal special fruit cake
- Plum Pudding cake
- Rich plum cake
- Black forest cake
- Pizza
- Pizza puffs
- Minced pie tart
- Cheese Samosa
- Baklava
- Challah
- Rum balls
- Cheese puffs

== Legend ==
It is said that Geoffrey Fisher once visited the bakery in Kolkata, India. The archbishop of Canterbury ate the fruit cake of the shop and praised it. Although this story is considered as a legend.
