= Stracciatella (ice cream) =

Variety of gelato

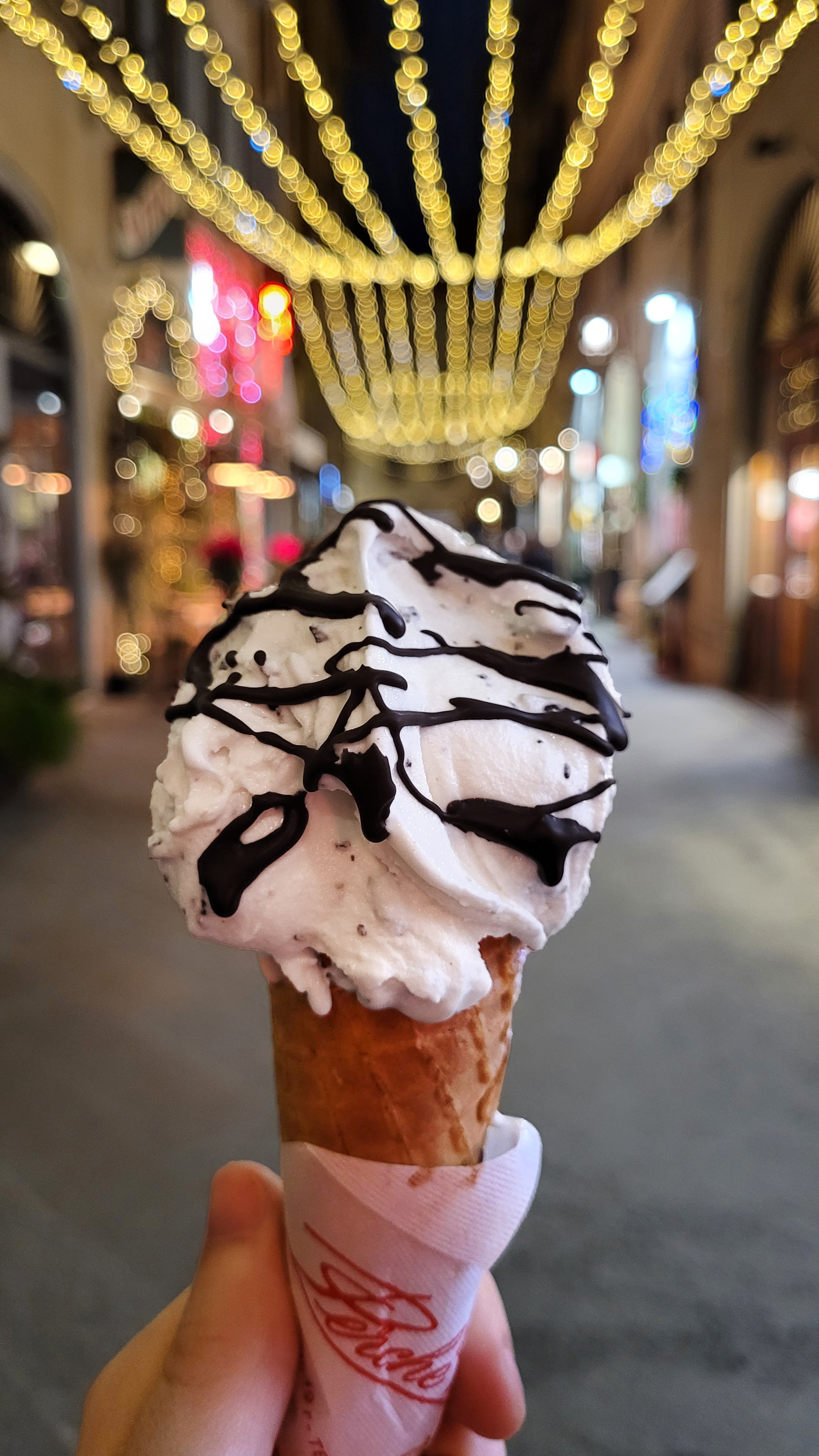
- Stracciatella ice cream cone
- Type: Ice cream
- Place of origin: Italy
- Region or state: Lombardy
- Created by: Enrico Panattoni
- Invented: 1961
- Main ingredients: Milk, cream, sugar, milk chocolate
- Ingredients generally used: Dark chocolate

Stracciatella (Italian: [strattʃaˈtɛlla]) is a variety of gelato with fine strands of drizzled chocolate stirred through it. It was originally created in Bergamo, northern Italy, at the Ristorante La Marianna in 1961. Stracciatella was inspired by stracciatella soup, made from broth into which beaten egg is drizzled, popular around Rome.

== Description ==
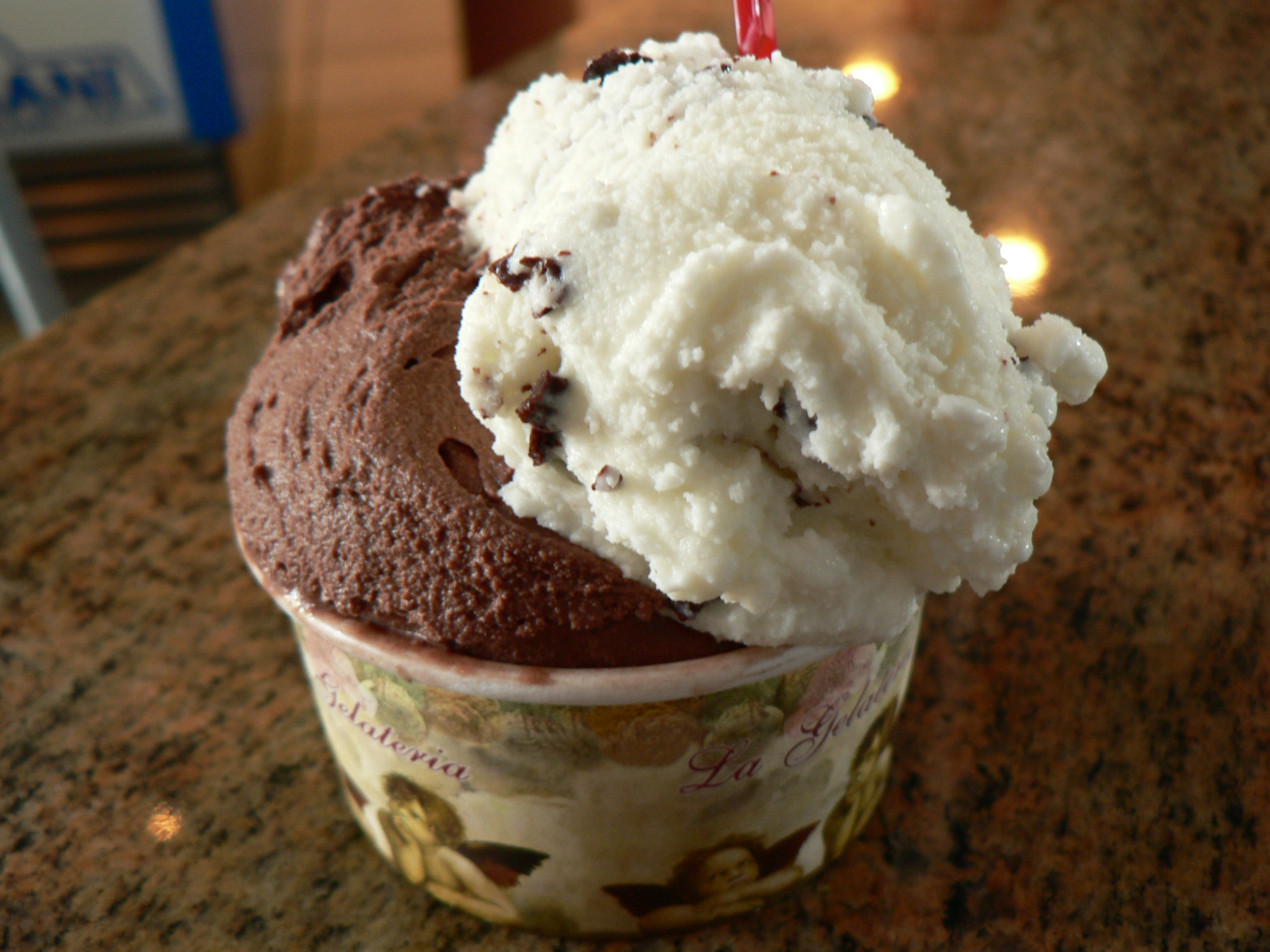
Stracciatella over chocolate ice cream

Makers produce the effect by drizzling melted chocolate into plain milk ice cream towards the end of the churning process; the chocolate solidifies immediately after coming in contact with the cold ice cream, and is then broken up and incorporated into the ice cream with a spatula. This process creates the shreds of chocolate that give stracciatella its name, the word meaning 'little shred' in Italian. While stracciatella ice cream traditionally involves milk ice cream and milk chocolate, modern variations can also be made with vanilla and dark chocolate.

== Origin ==
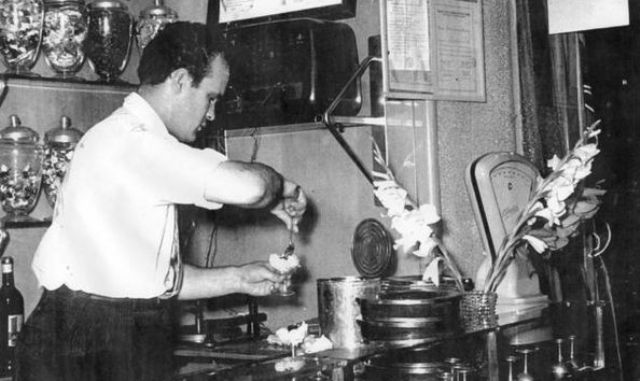
Enrico Panattoni

Enrico Panattoni, the owner of La Marianna, a gelateria in Bergamo, in northern Italy, invented the dish in 1961. (Note: The youngest member of a family of peasant farmers from Altopascio, in Tuscany, Enrico Panattoni (1927–2013) came to Bergamo in 1946 where, after initially managing to set up a bar selling castagnaccio (a simple chestnut-flour cake), he opened La Marianna, which became renowned for its gelato, including stracciatella, as well as its upper-storey Tuscan restaurant, then a novelty in Bergamo. In 1973, Panattoni's son Mirko was kidnapped and later released by an unknown criminal group—the first of a series of children held to ransom in Italy in recent decades.) According to Panattoni, the idea came to him after he had grown tired of stirring eggs into broth to satisfy customers of his restaurant who kept asking for stracciatella soup.

He was passionate about cooking and pastry and, after numerous experiments, he produced a white ice cream made of cream peppered with irregular pieces of dark chocolate. During the freezing process, he inserted a dose of melted dark chocolate that was instantly solidified and then shredded by the paddles of the ice-cream machine.

The melted chocolate that solidifies and shatters in the batch freezer is reminiscent of the egg that binds in the boiling broth of the stracciatella alla romana. "Stracciatella alla romana was the most famous consommé and, along with that soup, I was looking for an ice cream that could be loved and appreciated by my customers", said Panattoni.

== See also ==
- Stracciatella (cheese)
- List of ice cream flavors
