= Bandel cheese =

Cheese that originated in the erstwhile Portuguese colony Bandel in eastern India

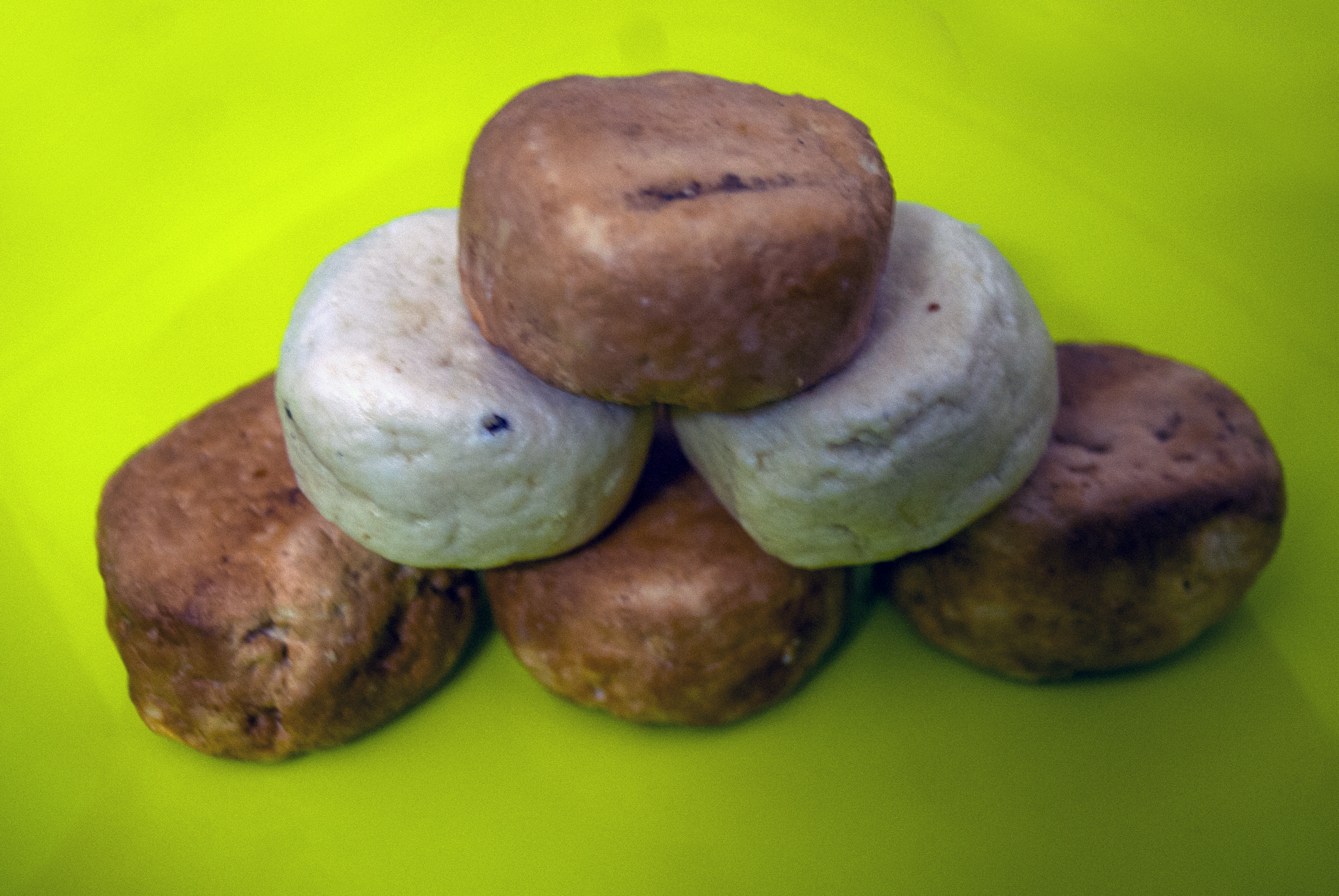
- Country of origin: India
- Region: East India, West Bengal
- Town: Bandel, Hooghly, Chinsurah, Chandannagar, Tarakeswar
- Source of milk: Cows
- Pasteurized: No
- Texture: Crumbly Semi-Soft
- Dimensions: Circular, Diameter=1 in, Height=1/4 in
- Weight: Variable
- Named after: Bandel

Bandel cheese is a cheese that originated in the erstwhile Portuguese colony Bandel in eastern India. It was introduced by the Portuguese and was made by the Mog (Burmese) under Portuguese supervision.

Today it is also sold in a couple of shops in New Market, Kolkata, though its originality and authenticity is unknown.

== Production ==
It is made by separating the curds from whey with lemon juice. It is then molded and drained in small baskets and smoked. Bandel cheese is known for its dry, crumbly texture and smoky flavor. Also, it is highly aromatic and fresh as it is sold in circular flats straight away after production. It is available in two varieties: plain (white) and smoked (brown). Bandel cheese is well salted and can be stored. It is an indigenous unripened, salted soft variety of cheese made in perforated pots. Today, the production is concentrated in the towns of Tarakeswar and Bishnupur, Bankura, near Kolkata, West Bengal, India. It is similar to Surti paneer, a goat milk cheese introduced by the Portuguese in Surat, Gujarat, India. but made from cow's milk.

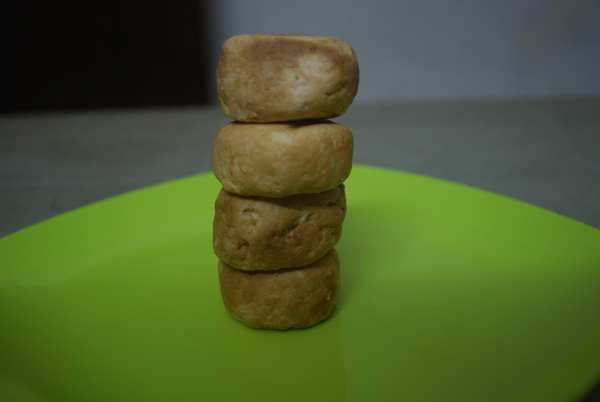
Bandel cheese (smoked)

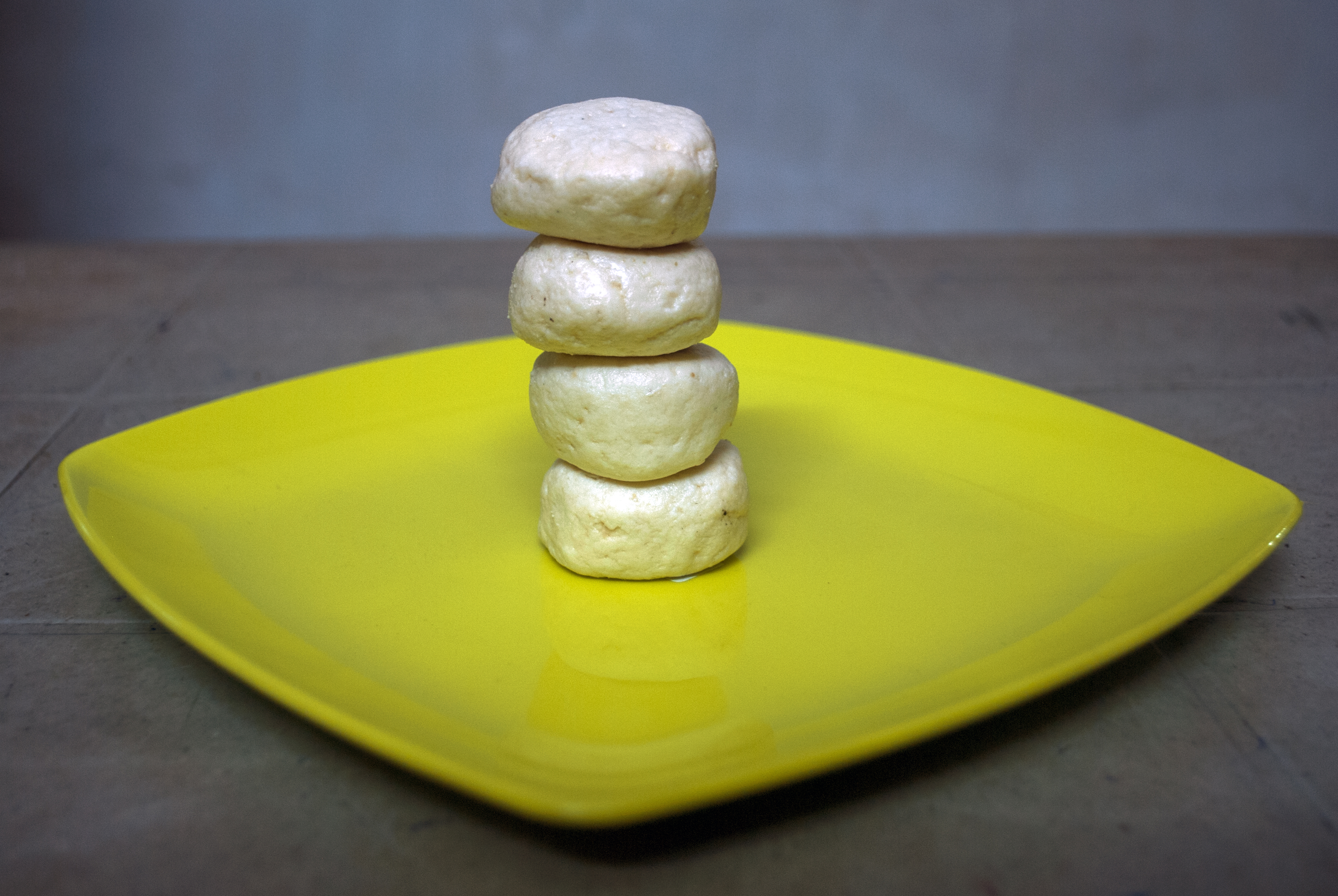
Bandel cheese (plain)

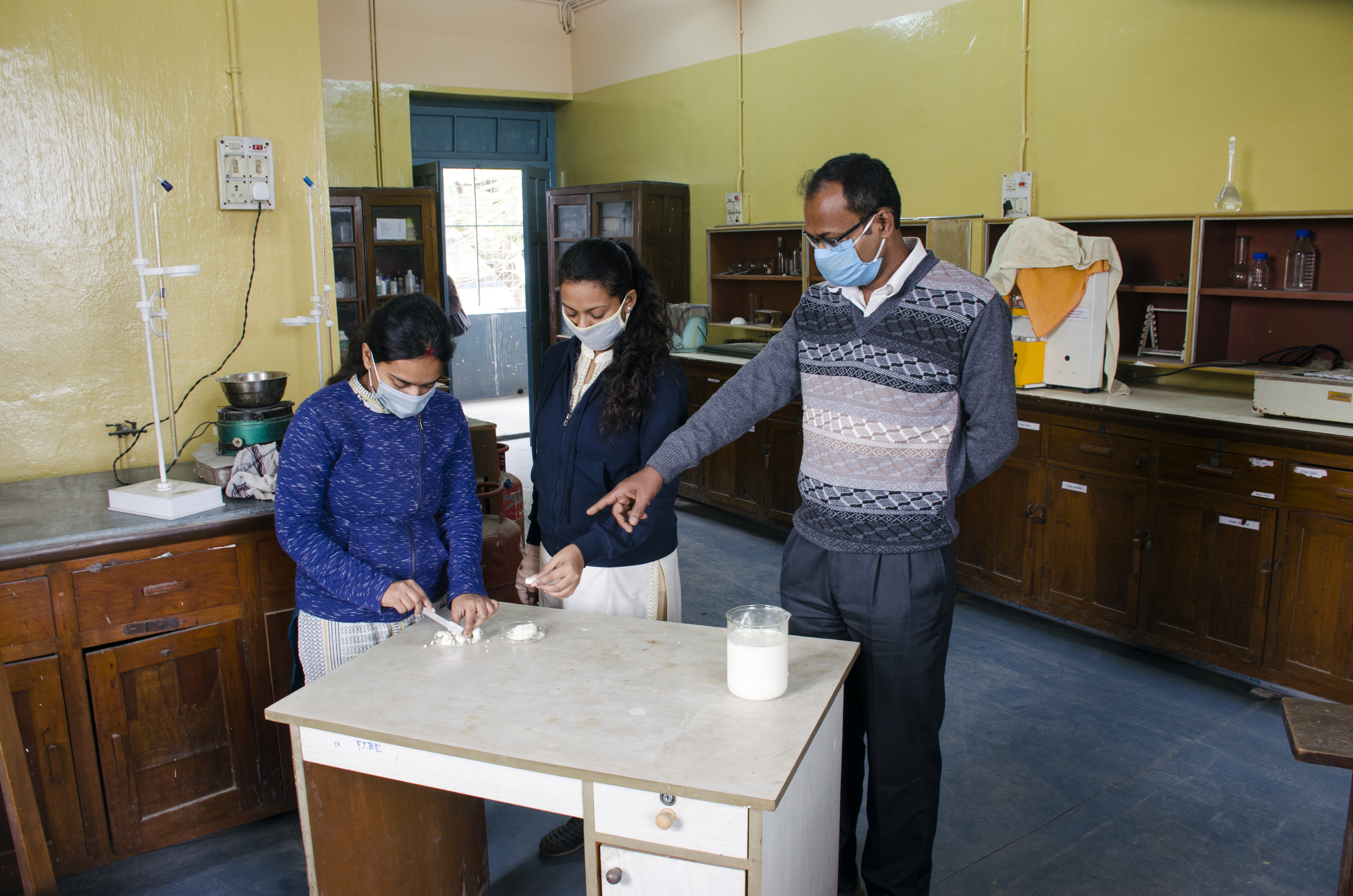
Prof. Debabrata Bera and two research scholars, Bedotroyee Chowdhury and Minakshi Chakraborty at the lab of Food Technology and Biochemical Engineering Department of Jadavpur University

Saurav Gupta, the owner of The Whole Hog Deli, is actively involved with the efforts to get the coveted GI Tag for the Bandel Cheese.

Saurav Gupta with Palash Ghosh, the Bandel Cheese maker.

== Culinary uses ==
Widely used in Anglo-Indian cuisine in Kolkata but Bandel cheese is hardly used as an ingredient in Bengali household. It is used as a salad dressing. The plain or non smoked version can be eaten on its own. The smoked version, which has more intense notes is used as pasta, risotto and salad topping. Home chefs and menu consultants have started using Bandel Cheese as an ingredient. It is deep fried and served with gooseberry chutney. Smoked Bandel Cheese is added as a topping to fig and almond tart. Even chefs outside Kolkata are using Bandel Cheese as an ingredient.

== Scientific study ==
In 2017 the Food Technology and Biochemical Engineering Department of Jadavpur University has started a scientific study of the Bandel Cheese under Debabrata Bera. The project funded by the Department of Science and Technology, Govt. of West Bengal aims at the hygienic production of Bandel Cheese in a controlled environment. The project also aims at measuring the economic potential of the cheese both in the domestic and international markets. The project also aims at training the artisans who presently making the cheese. Presently the cheese is being made by a single family in a village near Arambagh in Hooghly District. Finally the project aims at exploring the opportunities of getting a Geographical indication tag for Bandel Cheese. The project also aims at developing several by-products with medical and pharmaceutical values, including probiotic drinks.

== See also ==
- Paneer – Type of fresh cheese in South Asian cuisine
- Chhena – Type of cheese curds originating in India
- Khoa – Indian dairy food
- List of smoked foods
