= Stracciatella (soup) =

Italian soup

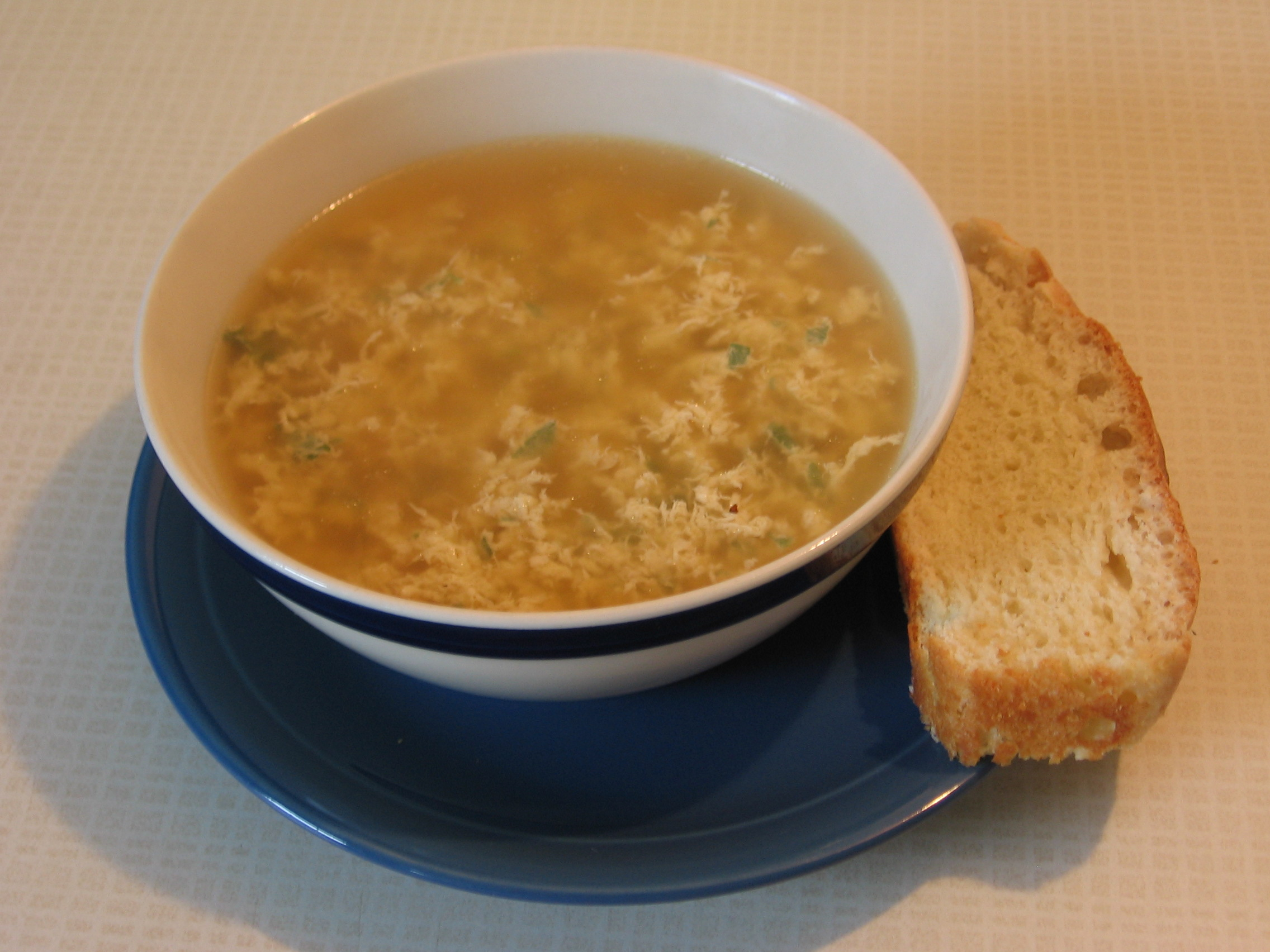
- Type: Soup
- Course: Primo (Italian course)
- Place of origin: Italy
- Region or state: Lazio; Marche; Abruzzo
- Main ingredients: Meat broth, beaten egg

Stracciatella (Italian: [strattʃaˈtɛlla]; in Italian, a diminutive derived from the verb stracciare ('to shred')), also known as stracciatella alla romana, is an Italian soup consisting of meat broth and small shreds of an egg-based mixture, prepared by drizzling the mixture into boiling broth and stirring. It is popular around the city of Rome, in Lazio. A similar soup, called zanzarelli, was described by Martino da Como in his 15th-century manual The Art of Cooking. Other variants exist.

== Description ==
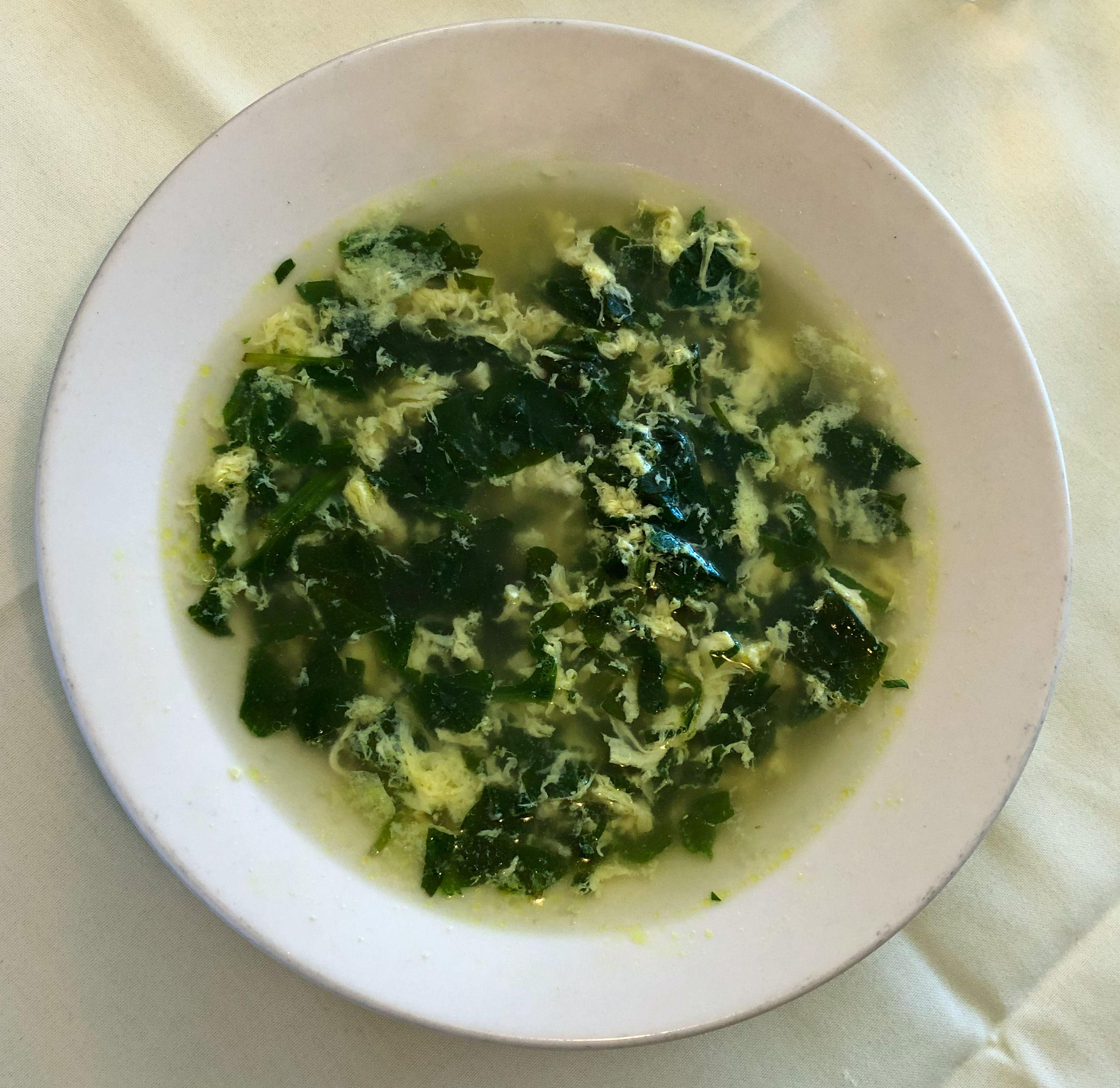
Stracciatella soup with spinach

Traditionally stracciatella alla romana used to be served at the start of Easter lunches. Stracciatella alla romana is traditionally prepared by beating eggs and mixing in grated Parmesan cheese, salt, pepper, nutmeg, lemon zest, and sometimes semolina; this mixture is then gently drizzled into boiling meat broth, while stirring so as to produce little shreds (stracciatelle) of cooked egg in the soup. The resulting soup can be served in bowls containing a few thin slices of toasted bread, with additional parmesan grated on top.

According to Ada Boni, stracciatella alla romana used to be scented with marjoram. Other traditional Italian and Italian-American recipes suggest garnishing with chopped parsley. Some American variations of the soup incorporate spinach as a main ingredient.

A recipe for a spicy soup made with eggs and broth that bears similarities to the modern-day stracciatella was recorded as early as the 15th century by Martino da Como in his Libro de Arte Coquinaria (The Art of Cooking) under the name of zanzarelli. (Note: Martino worked in Rome for some time for Cardinal Ludovico Trevisan, a purveyor of lavish banquets. As translated by Jeremy Parzen, Martino's recipe for zanzarelli reads: "To make ten servings: take eight eggs and a half libra of grated cheese, and a grated loaf of bread and mix together. Then take a pot of meat broth made yellow with saffron and place over heat; and when it begins to boil, pour the mixture into a pot and stir with a spoon. When the dish has begun to thicken, remove from heat and serve in bowls, topped with spices." A "green" variant of the soup omits the saffron.) The traditional preparation of stracciatella is also rather similar to that of sciusceddu, a rich festive soup from Messina, Sicily, that may be a cousin of the Roman dish. (Note: Another soup dish traditionally served at Easter, sciusceddu (also known as sciuscellu or ciuscello), is prepared by dropping a mixture of beaten eggs and sieved ricotta cheese into broth containing small meatballs made with minced veal, caciocavallo cheese, breadcrumbs and parsley.)

== Legacy ==
Stracciatella soup inspired the gelato flavour of the same name, which was created in 1961 by a restaurateur in the northern city of Bergamo, who claimed he had grown tired of stirring eggs into broth to satisfy customers from Rome.

== See also ==
- List of Italian soups
- Egg drop soup
