= Dali ni horbo =

Indonesian cuisine

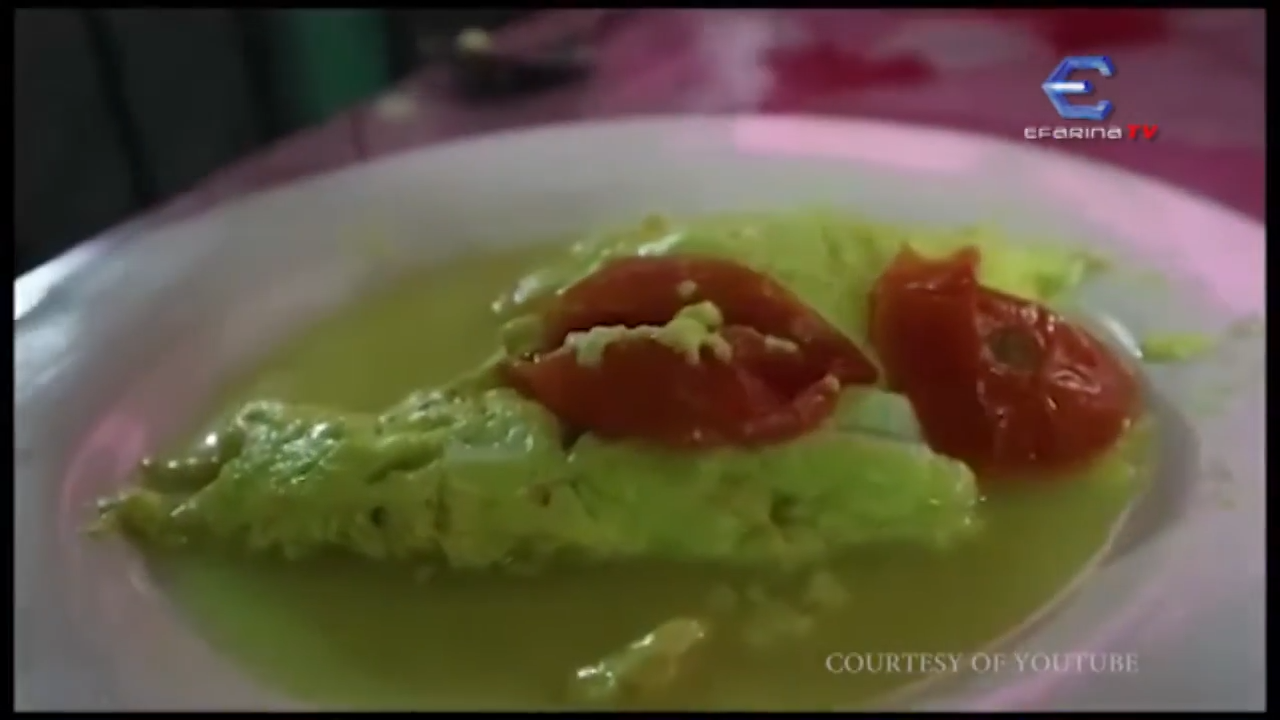
Dali ni horbo

Dali ni horbo, bagot ni horbo (water buffalo milk) is a Batak dish from Tapanuli, North Sumatra, Indonesia.

== History ==
Dali no horbo is a mainstay of diet of the Batak people.

Dali is traded as a commodity in the onan (markets) of Tapanuli.

== Nutrition ==
Water buffalo milk contains 40% more protein than that of the domestic dairy cow and twice the butterfat. It has 43% less cholesterol. In some cases it is tolerated by individuals who have a cow milk allergy. The Batak boil the milk and process it into dali ni horbo by clabbering it with pineapple juice or papaya leaf juice.

The water buffalo is milked early in the morning. About two liters a day are drawn from each cow for human consumption, leaving the balance for the nursing calf.

== See also ==
- Batak cuisine
