= Surti paneer =

Indian soft cheese prepared from buffalo milk

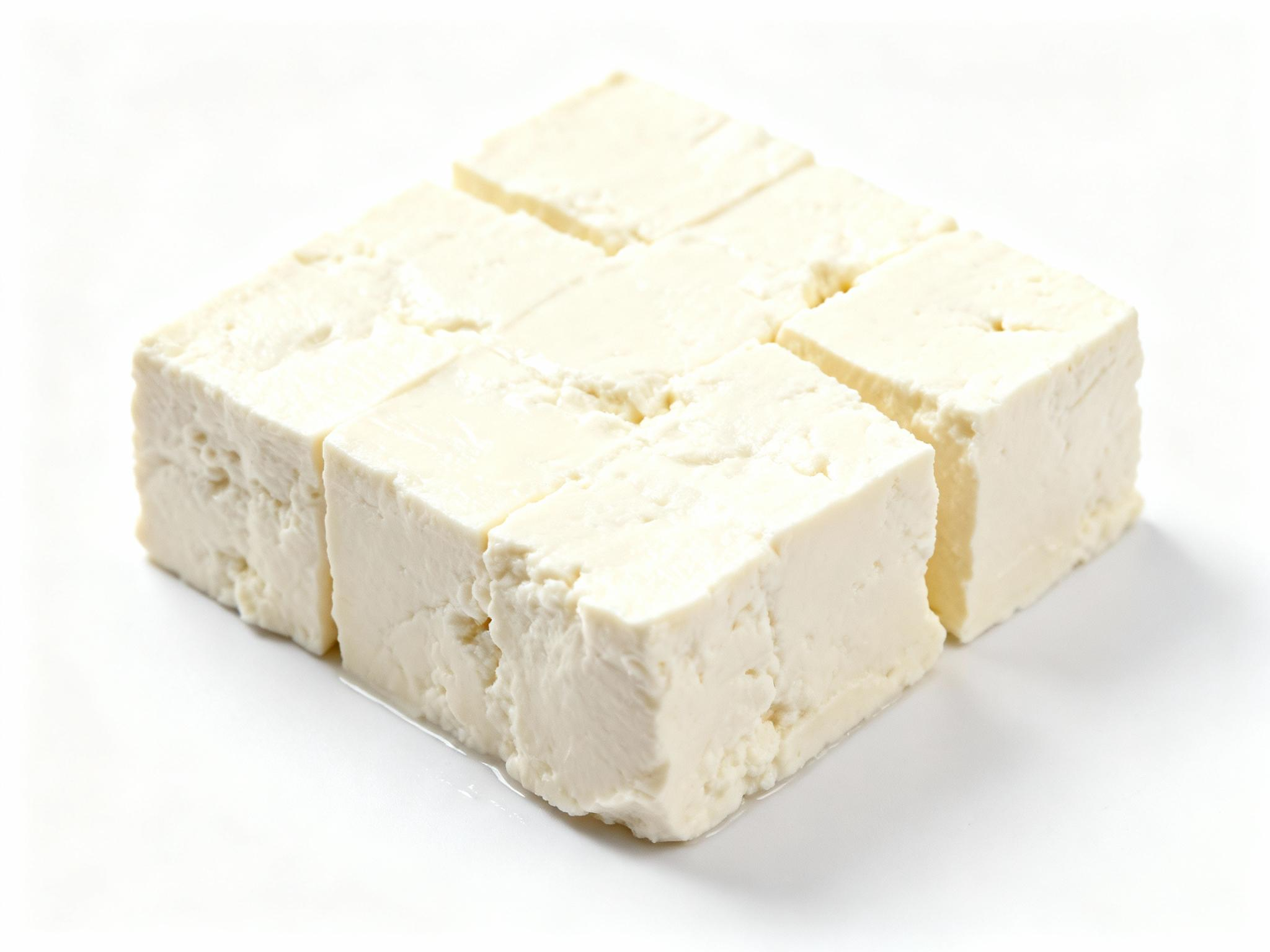
- Country of origin: India
- Region: Gujarat, Western India
- Town: Surat
- Source of milk: Water buffalo
- Pasteurised: no
- Texture: firm

Surti paneer is a soft cheese associated with Surat in India. It is a type of paneer that is prepared from buffalo milk which is coagulated using rennet. The cheese is then ripened in whey for up to 36 hours. The cheese has a Portuguese influence. The name is derived from the town of Surat in the state of Gujarat, Western India, where it is thought to originate from.

== See also ==
- List of water buffalo cheeses
