= Shirazi salad =

Iranian salad

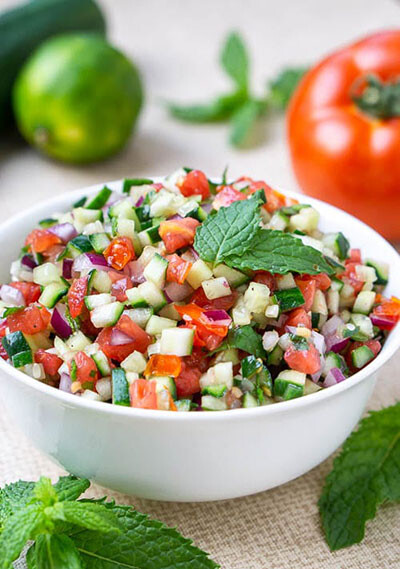
- Type: Salad
- Course: Entrée, side dish
- Place of origin: Iran
- Region or state: Iran (Shiraz)
- Associated cuisine: Iranian cuisine
- Created by: Shirazis
- Serving temperature: Cold
- Main ingredients: Cucumber, tomato, onion, mint, parsley, lime juice, Verjuice
- Food energy (per serving): 50 kcal (210 kJ)

Shirazi salad (Persian: سالاد شیرازی sālād shirāzi) is a Persian salad that originated from and is named after Shiraz in southern Iran. It is a relatively modern dish, dating to sometime after the introduction of the tomato to Iran at the end of the nineteenth century in the Qajar era. Its primary ingredients are cucumber, tomato, onion, olive oil, herbal spices and verjuice, although lime juice is sometimes used in its preparation. In Iran, it is eaten in the summer as a side dish on its own, and year-round as a side dish alongside meat-based foods such as Persian kabob and as a side dish before and after meals. Shirazi salad is sometimes served as an accompaniment to rice such as loobia polo, an Iranian rice dish made with green beans and tomatoes. Cookbook author Jila Dana-Haeri describes it as a refreshing dish during the summer.

== National salad in Iran ==
Shirazi salad has been described as being akin to a national salad in Iran, and it is a common meal accompaniment. It may also be used in a manner similar to that of a condiment, to reduce the herbal flavor of stews. It typically has a crisp and moist texture, and is somewhat similar to pico de gallo and Mediterranean salad.

The primary ingredients of Shirazi salad are finely diced cucumber, tomato, and onion, which are mixed with verjuice (primarily in the north of Iran (Gilan and Mazandaran) and the Azerbaijan region), sometimes fresh lemon or lime juice . Olive oil, salt, and pepper may be used, and additional ingredients may include chopped mint, parsley, Delal, scallions, dill, sumac, and red vinegar. The salad may have a sour and salty flavor, and its flavor may increase after being set for an hour or longer before serving, which allows time for the flavors to intermingle. It may be served with breads such as pita and lavash, or with cheese and/or walnuts.

=== Spices ===
It is not recommended to eat Shirazi salad with sour spices. It is preferable to add spices with a mild flavor to Shirazi salad.

== See also ==
- Afghan salad, a similar salad from Afghanistan
- Arab salad, a similar salad from the Arab world
- Armenian salad, a similar salad from Armenia
- Çoban salatası, a similar salad from Turkey
- Greek salad, a similar salad from Greece
- Israeli salad, a similar salad from Israel
- Kachumbari, a similar salad from East Africa
- Kachumber, a similar salad from India
- Pico de gallo, a similar salsa from Mexico
- Salata baladi, a similar salad from Egypt
- Serbian salad, a similar salad from Serbia
- Shopska salad, a similar salad from Bulgaria
