= Fattoush =

Lebanese salad with toasted flatbread

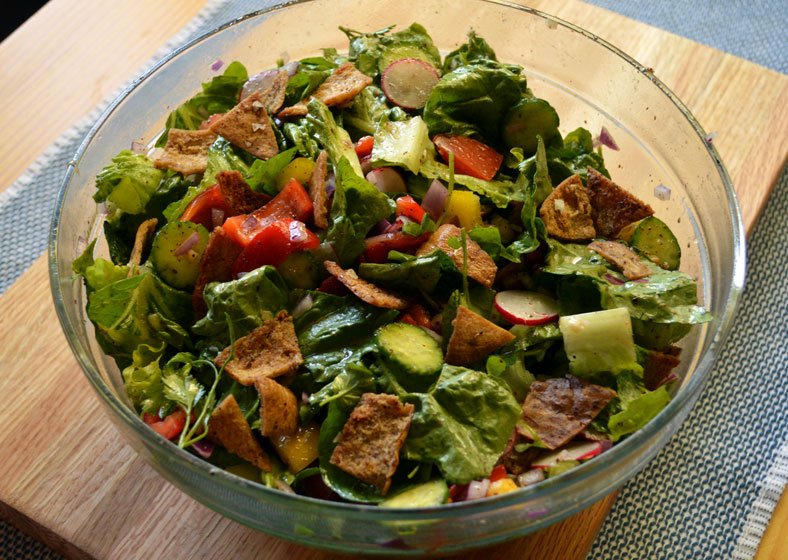
- Type: Salad
- Region or state: Levant
- Main ingredients: Pita, mixed greens, vegetables Dressing: olive oil, lemon juice

Fattoush (Arabic: فتّوش; also fattush, fatush, fattoosh, and fattouche) is a Levantine salad made from toasted or fried pieces of pita combined with mixed greens and other vegetables, such as radishes, cucumber and tomatoes. Fattoush is a common part of meals in communities in the Levant.

== Etymology ==
Fattūsh is derived from the Arabic fatt "crush" and the suffix of Turkic origin -ūsh. Coining words this way was common in Levantine Arabic.

According to Oxford English Dictionary, the earliest English use of the word fattoush was in 1955 by Stevens Point Journal.

== History ==
According to historian Nawal Nasrallah, recipes of vegetarian tharid reminiscent of fattoush can be found in a 10th-century Arabic cookbook by Ibn Sayyar al-Warraq, using dried and crumbled bread, cucumbers, herbs, and olive oil.

Late 19th-century Orientalist Reinhart Dozy described fettush or fetush (فتّوش) as a dish prepared from stale, dried bread that is soaked in water and then squeezed dry before being mixed with finely chopped cucumbers or onions, mint, purslane, olives, salt, vinegar, and oil. This description appears in materials published by the International Congress of Orientalists between 1889 and 1891.

== Ingredients ==
Fattoush belongs to the family of dishes known as fattat (plural of fatteh), which use stale flatbread as a base. Fattoush includes vegetables and herbs varying by season and taste. The vegetables are cut into relatively large pieces compared to tabbouleh which requires ingredients to be finely chopped. Sumac is usually used to give fattoush its sour taste, while some recipes also add pomegranate molasses along with the sumac.

== Variations ==
In Palestinian cuisine, fattoush is prepared by crushing garlic, salt, chili pepper (or any hot pepper), and fresh basil leaves together in a pestle and mortar, then mixing them with a generous amount of lemon juice and tahini, and occasionally yogurt. Bite-sized pieces of untoasted pita bread are dipped into this mixture to absorb the liquid. Vegetables are added afterward, and the dish is finished with olive oil. A distinctive feature of the Palestinian version is the inclusion of white onions, which are absent in the Lebanese version. In Jordan, a similar method is followed, but jameed is used in place of the tahini mixture.

== In culture ==
Fattoush is a frequent item of discussion about cultural appropriation within the politics of food in the Arab–Israeli conflict. Fattoush being labelled as "Israeli" is considered by some to be cultural appropriation. Jake Wallis Simons argued in Spiked Magazine that Jews originating from the region have also been making fattoush for a long time.

In 2025, fattoush ranked 5th in the "100 Best Foods by Category" list published by Taste Atlas in the salads category based on user ratings.

== See also ==
- Arabic salad
- Dakos
- Israeli salad
- List of bread dishes
- List of hors d'oeuvre
- List of salads
- Panzanella, an Italian bread salad

== Bibliography ==
- Wright, Clifford A. (2003). information Title Little foods of the Mediterranean: 500 fabulous recipes for antipasti, tapas, hors d'oeuvre, meze, and more (Illustrated ed.). Harvard Common Press. ISBN 1-55832-227-2.
