= Nyama choma =

Grilled goat meat

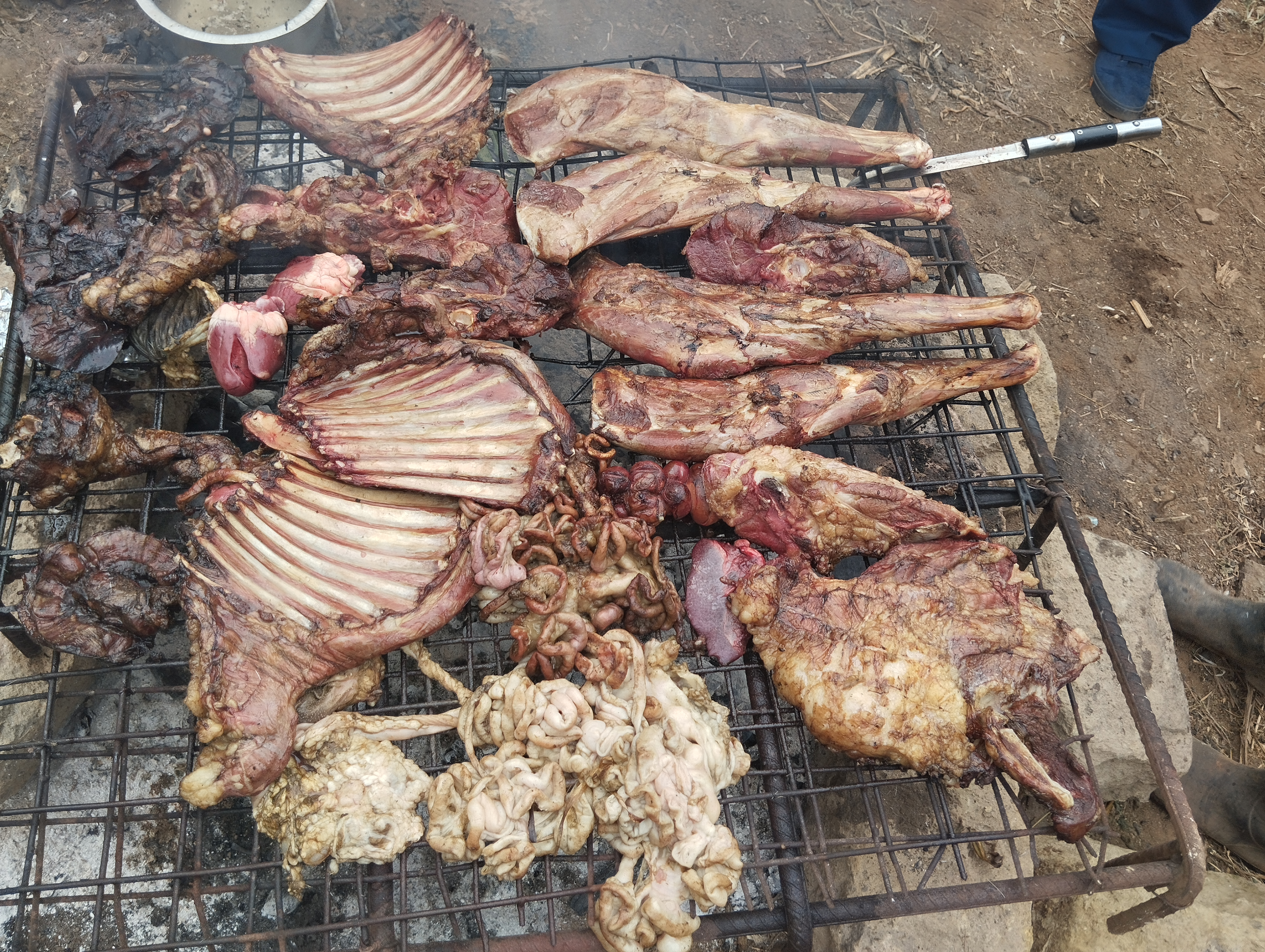
- Traditional Nyama choma barbecue grilling over coals
- Course: Main course, social dining
- Place of origin: Kenya
- Region or state: Nationwide
- Created by: Informal community practice
- Serving temperature: Hot
- Main ingredients: Various cuts of meat

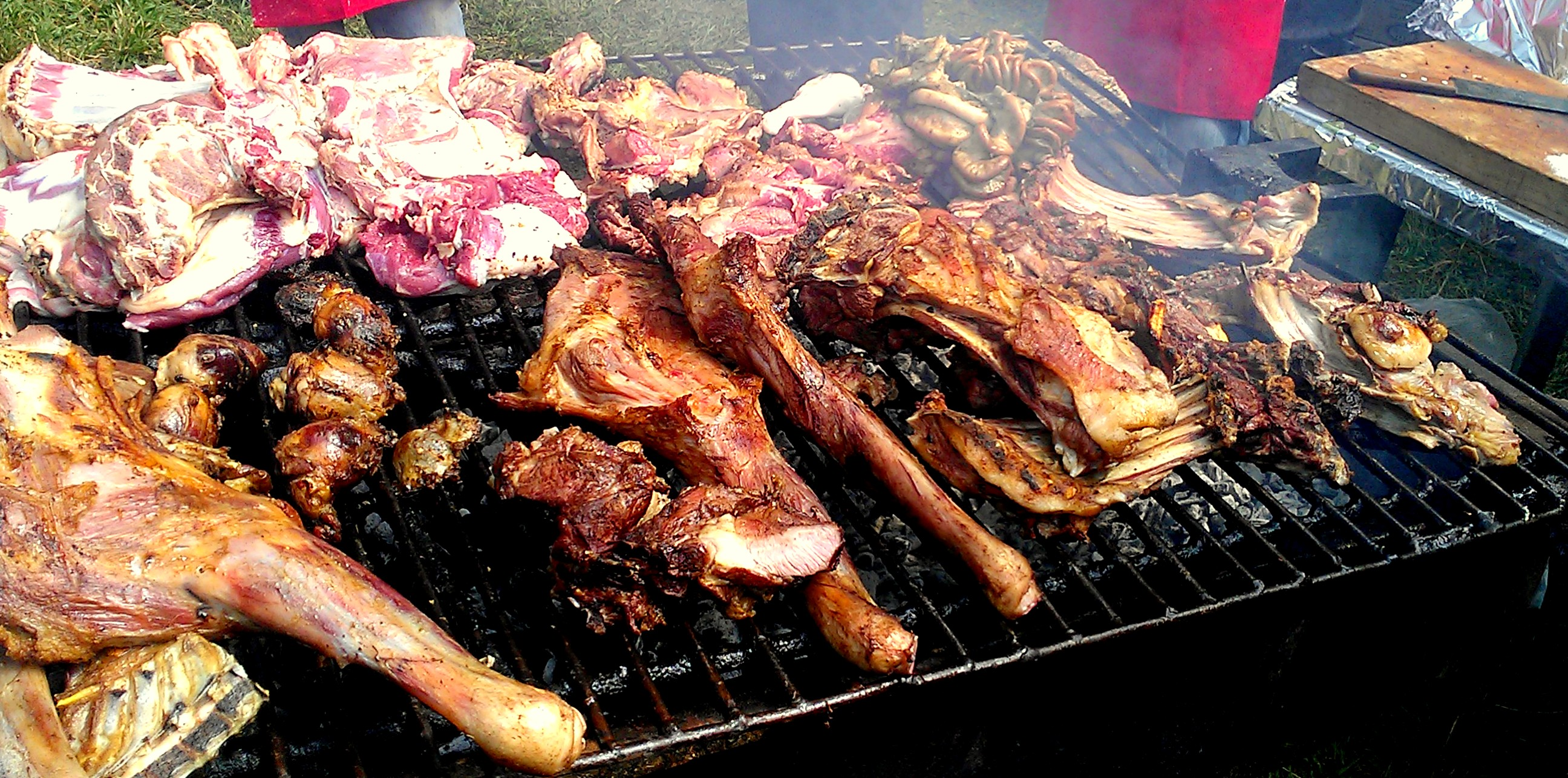
Nyama choma (Koroga Festival at Nairobi).

Nyama Choma is a specialty of grilled or barbecued goat meat or cattle meat. Roasted meat is very popular in Tanzania and Kenya, where it is considered the national dish. The expression nyama choma means "barbecue meat" in Kiswahili. Nyama choma gatherings are informal with people convening around an open fire for any special occasion and at any occasion with a grill. Thus it is a social custom in much of Eastern Africa.

== Preparation ==
Nyama choma traditions are very different from that of a barbecue, even if the method of food preparation is much similar. In Kenya, goat meat is preferred, but beef is also used. Wood and charcoal is seen as the best method to cook the meat as compared to gas grills.

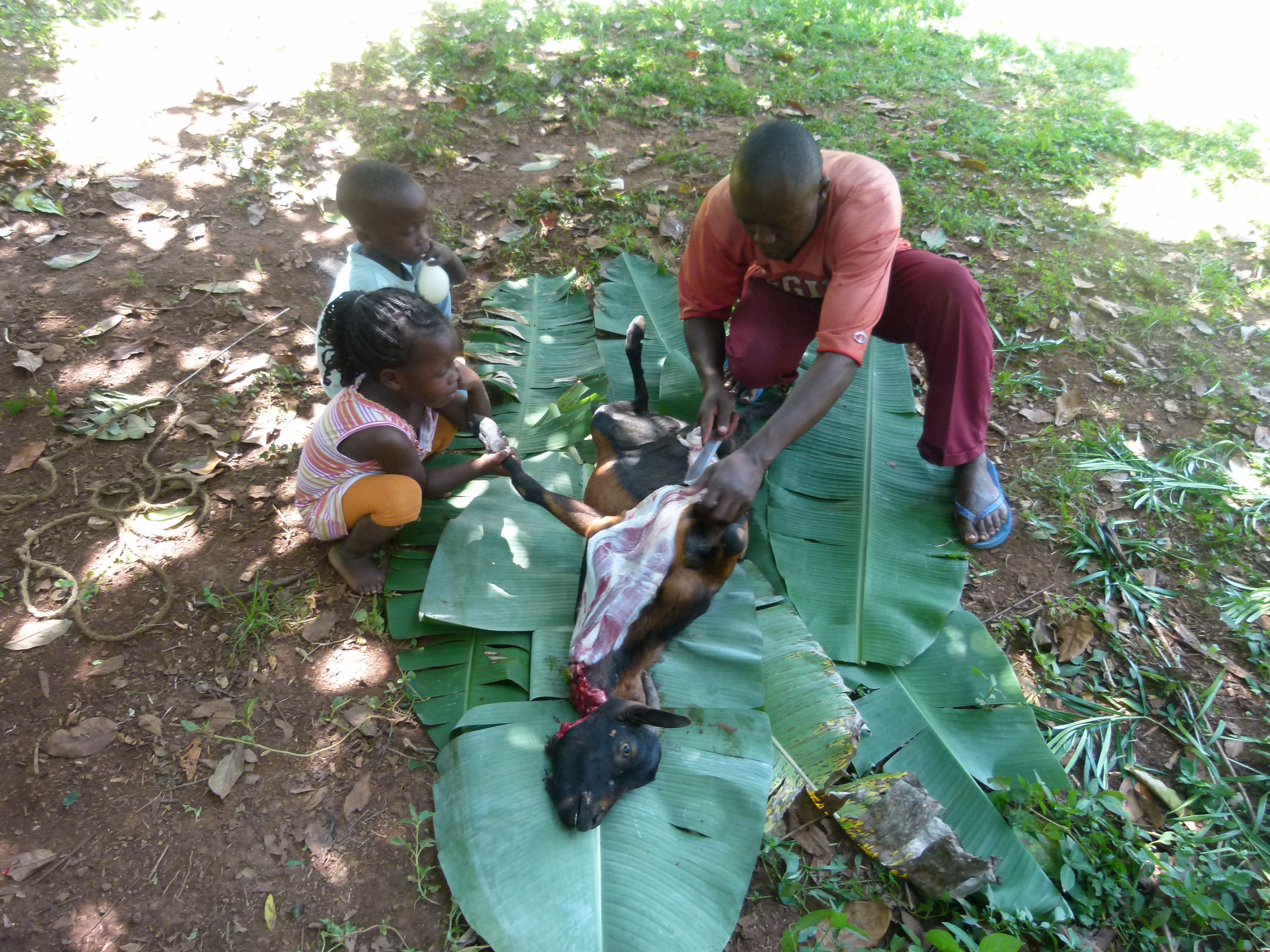

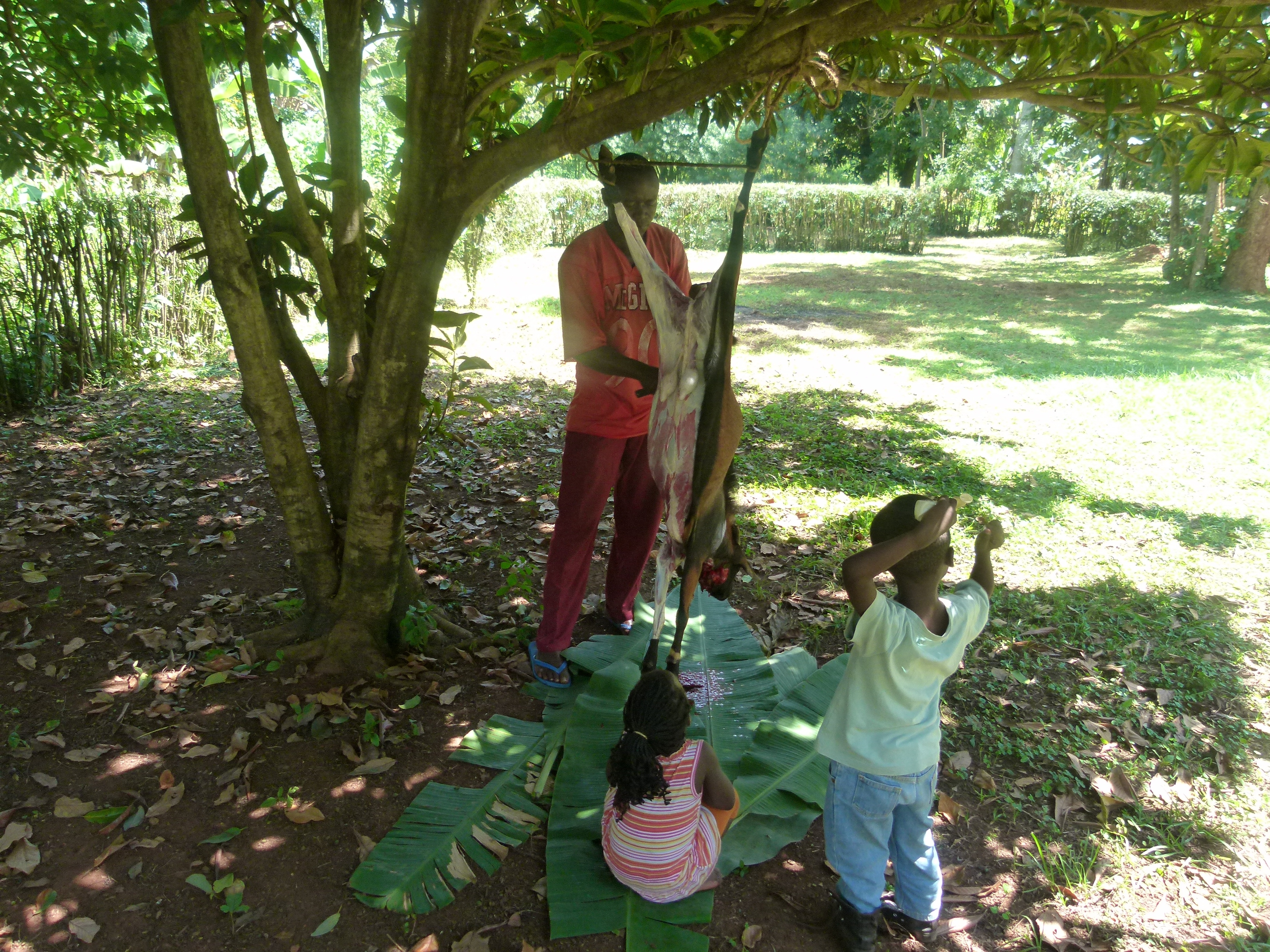

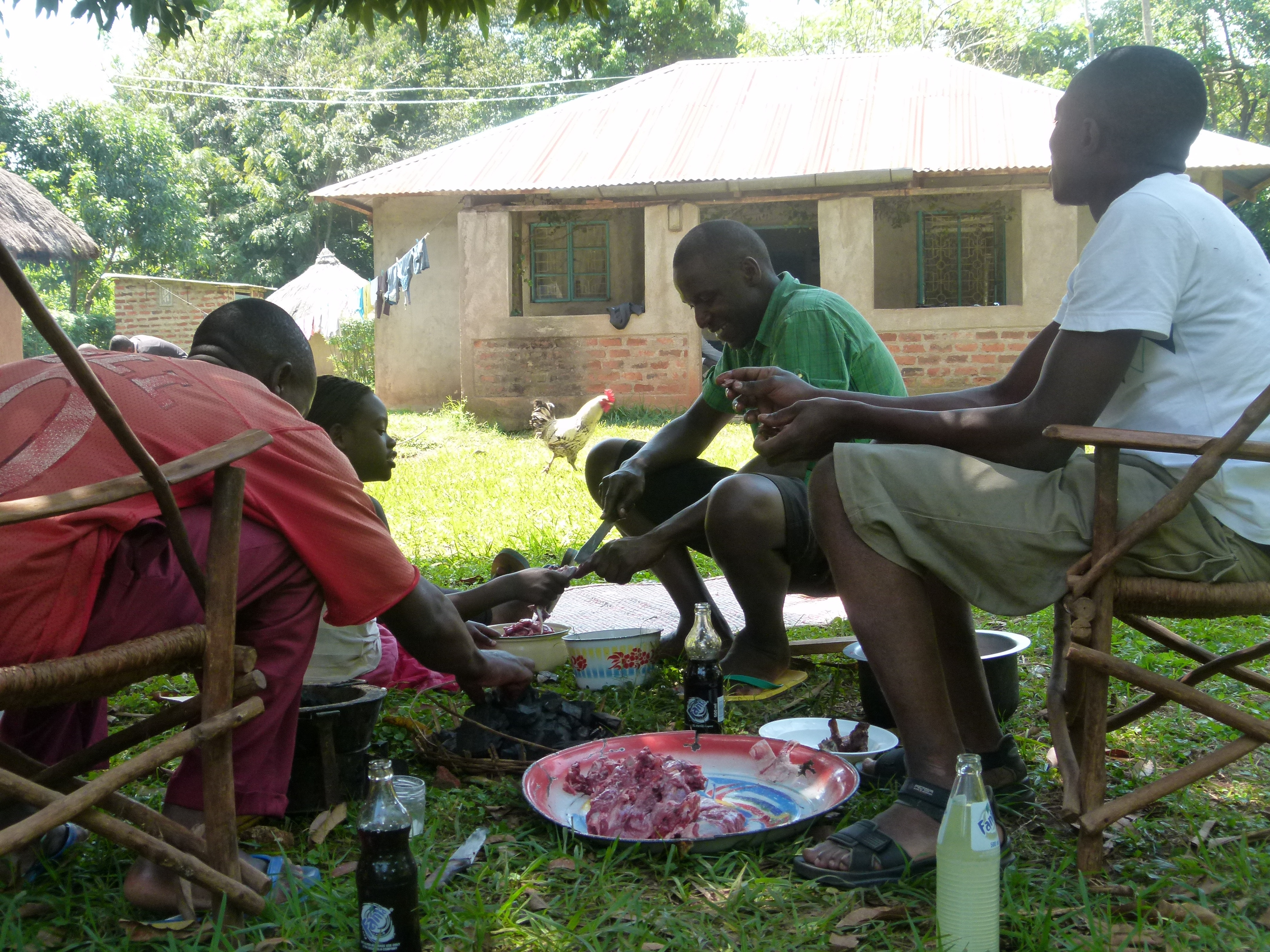

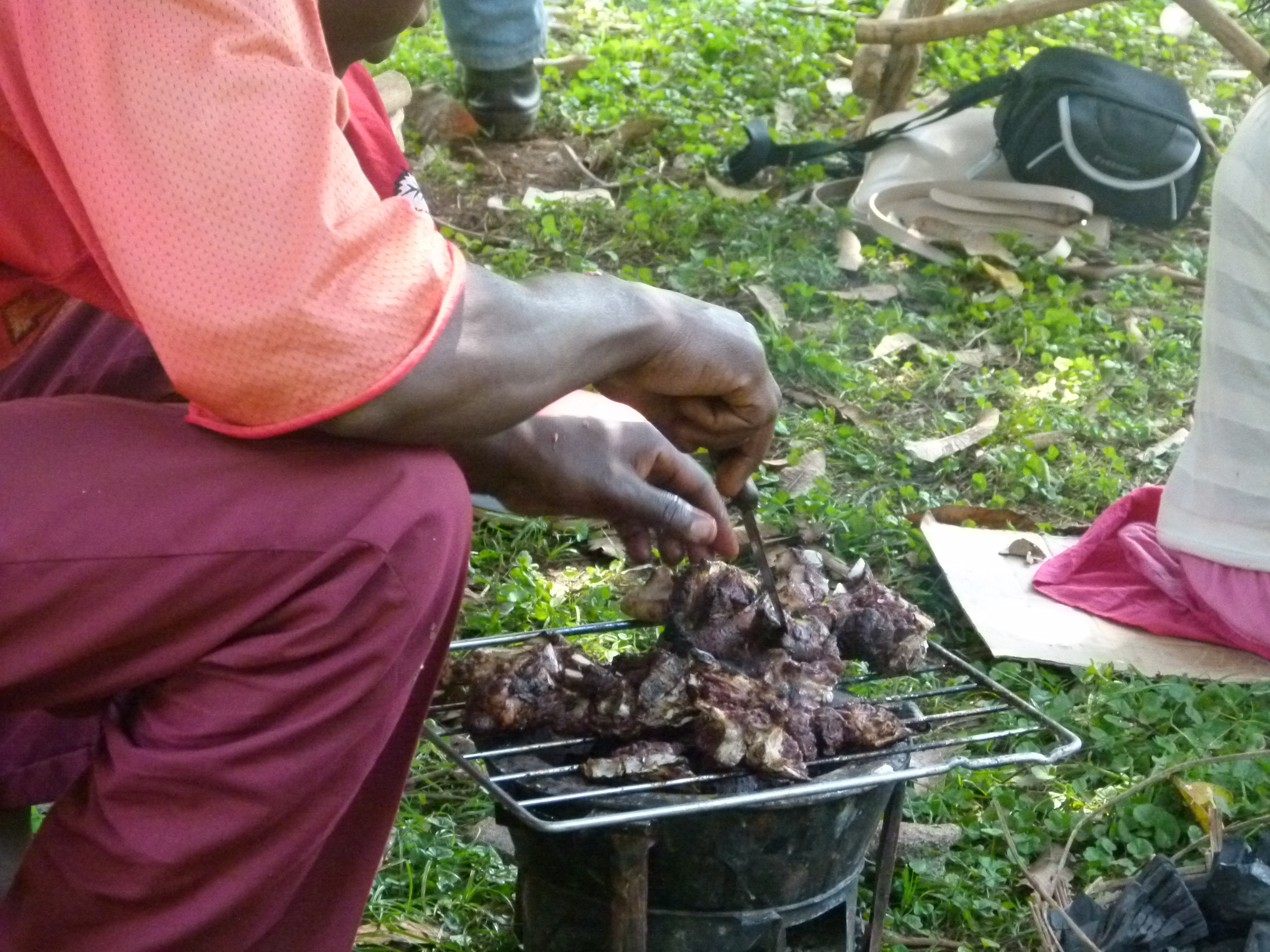

== Consumption ==
It is available in both roadside inns and larger restaurants. It is traditionally eaten with hands.

The side dishes are varied, but the most classic are salad kachumbari and ugali.

== Bibliography ==
- Juliana Letara, James MacGregor et Ced Hesse, Estimating the Economic Significance of Pastoralism: The example of the « nyama choma » sector in Tanzania, International Institute for Environment and Development (IIED), Edinburgh, November 2006, 20 p. [lire en ligne].
- Coco Wiseman, « Nyama choma (Kenyan grilled meat) », in African Cookbook: Coco Cooks Kenya, Springwood emedia ISBN 9781301841554.

== Annexes ==
- Braai
