= Shopska salad =

Bulgarian salad popular in Southeastern Europe

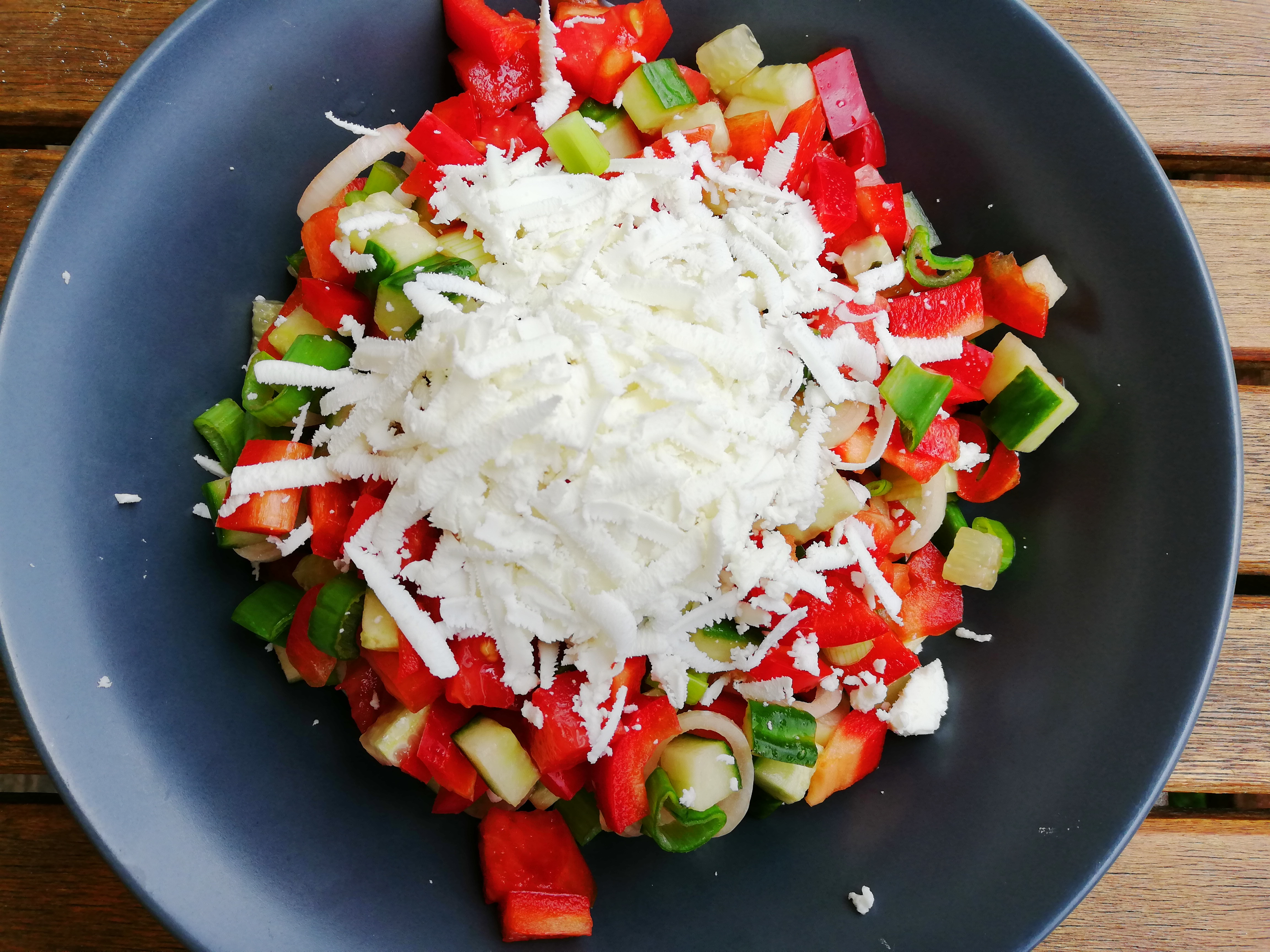
- Shopska salad as served in Bulgaria
- Alternative names: Bulgarian salad
- Type: Salad
- Place of origin: Bulgaria
- Main ingredients: Tomatoes, cucumbers, onions, peppers, sirene

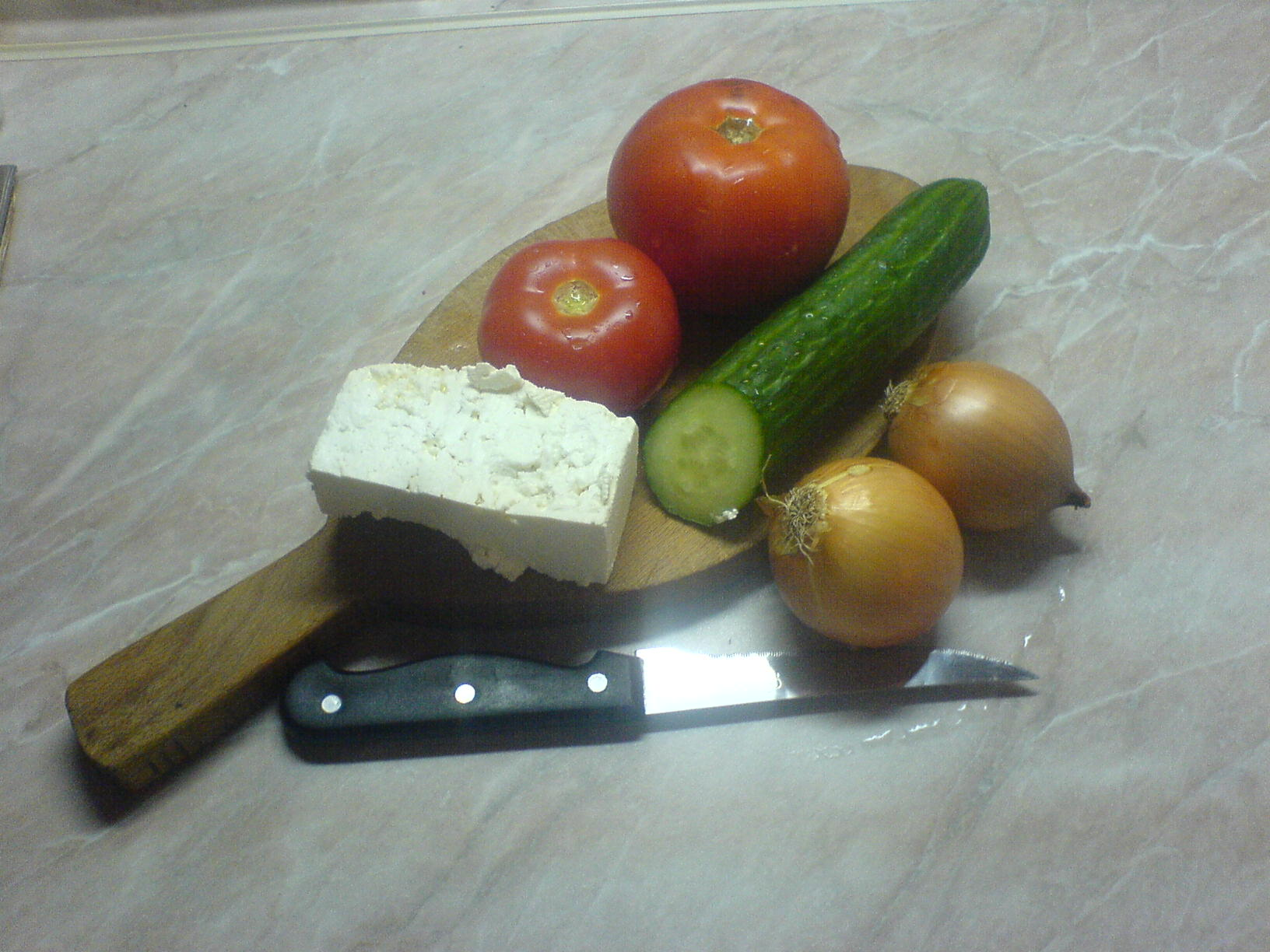
Ingredients for Shopska salad

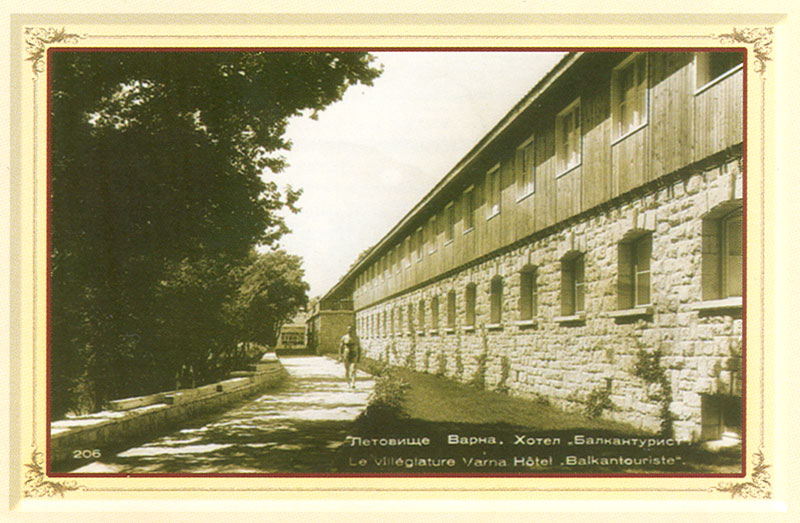
One of the first Balkantourist hotels in the Black Sea resort where the salad was invented (early 1950s)

Shopska salad (Note: Bulgarian, Macedonian and Serbian: Шопска салата; Croatian: Šopska salata; Romanian: Salata bulgărească; Czech: Šopský salát; Albanian: Sallatë Fshati; Hungarian: Sopszka saláta; Greek: Σαλάτα σόπσκα) is a cold salad popular throughout Southeastern Europe. It is Bulgaria's most famous salad and national dish.

== Ingredients and serving ==
The dish is made from tomatoes, cucumbers, onion/scallions, raw or roasted peppers, and sirene, a white brined cheese similar to feta, but much milder in taste. The vegetables are usually diced and salted, followed by a light dressing of sunflower oil (or olive oil), which is occasionally complemented by vinegar. The addition of vinegar contributes, however, to the sour flavour that the tomatoes impart. In restaurants, the dressings are provided separately. Finally, the vegetables are covered in a thick layer of grated or diced sirene cheese. This salad is often consumed as an appetizer with rakia.

According to food anthropologist Rayna Gavrilova, the dish is commonly accompanied by a shot of apricot or other fruit brandy.

== Background and history ==
Tomatoes appeared in Southeastern Europe in the mid-1800s. According to historical sources, in the last decades of the 19th century, Bulgarians had a vague idea of what a salad was. The import of vegetable seeds to Bulgaria was established only in the 1930s. Then salads were first adopted by the urban population and later recipes for them began to be published in cookbooks. The term "Shopska salad" first appeared in a Bulgarian cookbook from 1940, but it referred to a recipe for some kind of lyutenitsa.

In the post-war socialist era, Balkantourist focused on marketing Bulgaria's Black Sea coast as a tourist destination for Bulgarians and for western tourists as a way of showcasing the socialist "good life". This included reinventing and remarketing regional dishes to identify them as Bulgarian rather than simply Eastern European. The Shopska salad is a variation on a Greek salad of cucumbers, tomatoes, and feta; Balkantourist in 1956 named their version Shopska salad. The salad's colors, which mimic those of the Bulgarian flag, were coincidences which were seen as a positive for evoking national sentiment.

Despite the fact that the salad's name comes from the westernmost Bulgarian region called Shopluk, it first appeared at the Black Sea coast, in a resort near Varna, called Druzhba in the restaurant "Chernomorets". It can be found in one of the first state-approved cookbooks from 1956 (Sbornik recepti 1956, vol. 1, p. 50). The development and popularization of the salad is attributed to a leader in Bulgarian tourism Petar Doychev (1924–2019). According to Doychev, the Shopska salad was a continuation of the "Harvest salad", developed earlier by "Balkantourist".

The dish was initially served in Bulgaria only in the hotels of Balkantourist. It is the only survivor of five or six recipes similarly created for and marketed by the tourism industry. It became an emblem of Bulgarian tourism. It was approved as a national culinary symbol during the 1970s and 1980s. In 2014 Shopska salad was Bulgaria's most recognizable dish in Europe. It was the most popular recipe in a European Parliament initiative called A Taste of Europe. In 2025, CNN ranked Shopska salad among the 24 best salads in the world.

=== Origin dispute ===
According to the Bulgarian edition of Deutsche Welle, the Balkantourist recipe spread from Bulgaria to the cuisine of neighboring countries. Deutsche Welle noted a restaurant in Croatia claimed the salad as a Croatian national dish. According to Radio Bulgaria and the Sofia News Agency, Serbian newspaper Politika in the 2000s claimed the salad as Serbian rather than Bulgarian, Macedonian or Czech. According to the Bulgarian weekly 168 hours, in North Macedonia, they also claim the Shopska salad as a local product.

== Similar dishes in other cuisines ==
- Afghan salad, a similar salad from Afghanistan
- Arab salad, a similar salad from the Arab world
- Armenian salad, a similar salad from Armenia
- Çoban salatası, a similar salad from Turkey
- Greek salad, a similar salad from Greece
- Israeli salad, a similar salad from Israel
- Kachumbari, a similar salad from East Africa
- Kachumber, a similar salad from India
- Pico de gallo, a similar salsa from Mexico
- Serbian salad, a similar salad from Serbia
- Shirazi salad, a similar salad from Iran
