= Çoban salatası =

Turkish salad

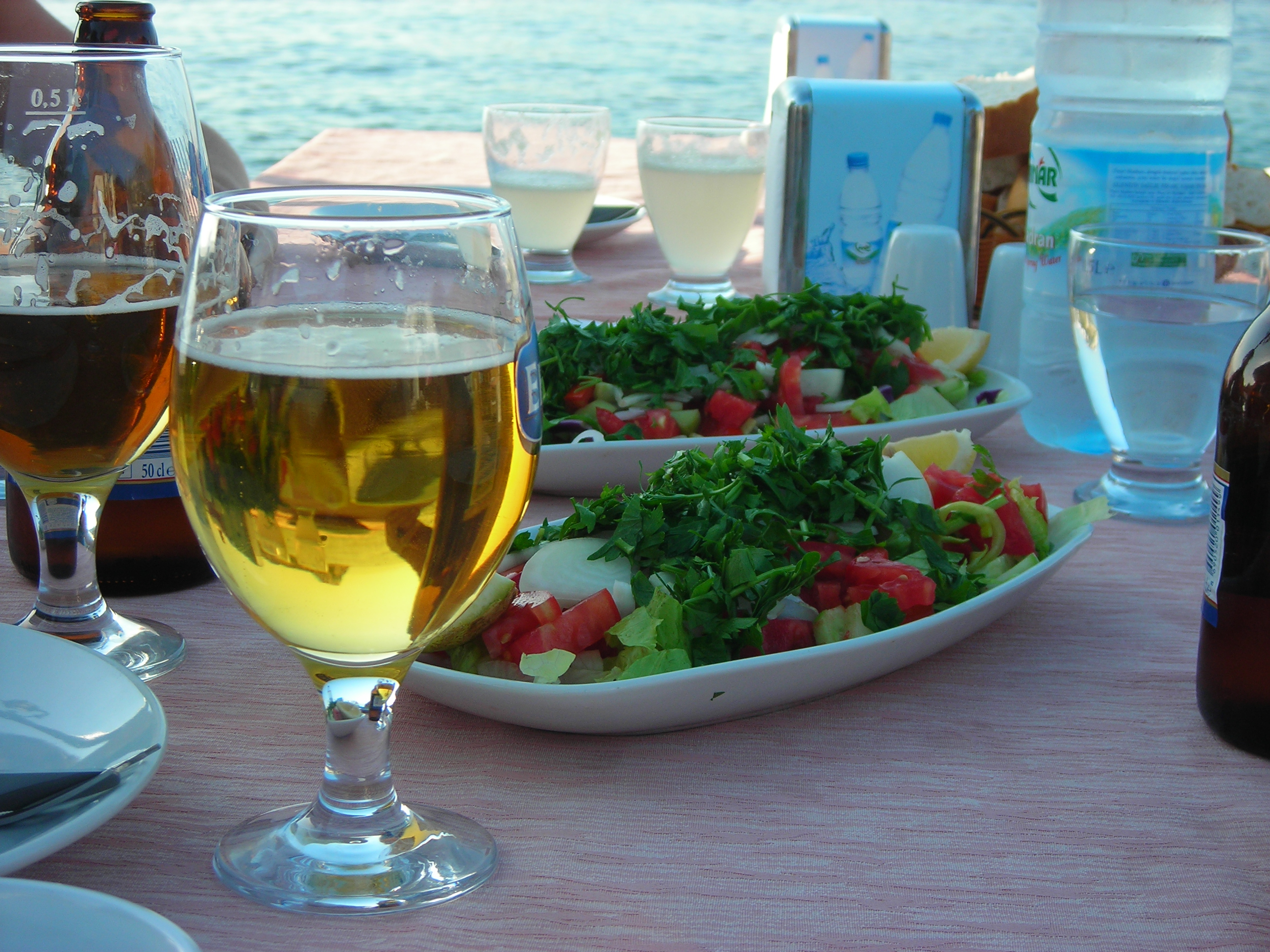
- Choban salad served with beer
- Alternative names: Shepherd's salad
- Type: Salad
- Place of origin: Turkey
- Main ingredients: Tomatoes, cucumbers, onions, green peppers and flat-leaf parsley

Çoban salatası or choban salad (Turkish for "shepherd's salad") is a salad that originated from Turkish cuisine, consisting of finely chopped tomatoes (preferably peeled), cucumbers, long green peppers, onion, and flat-leaf parsley. The dressing consists of lemon juice, olive oil, and salt.

== See also ==
Similar salads

- Afghan salad, from Afghanistan
- Arab salad, from the Arab world
- Armenian salad, a similar salad from Armenia
- Greek salad, from Greece
- Israeli salad, from Israel
- Kachumbari, from East Africa
- Kachumber, from India
- Serbian salad, from Serbia
- Shirazi salad, from Iran
- Shopska salad, from Bulgaria

Similar salsas

- Pico de gallo, from Mexico
