= Pico de gallo =

Mexican condiment

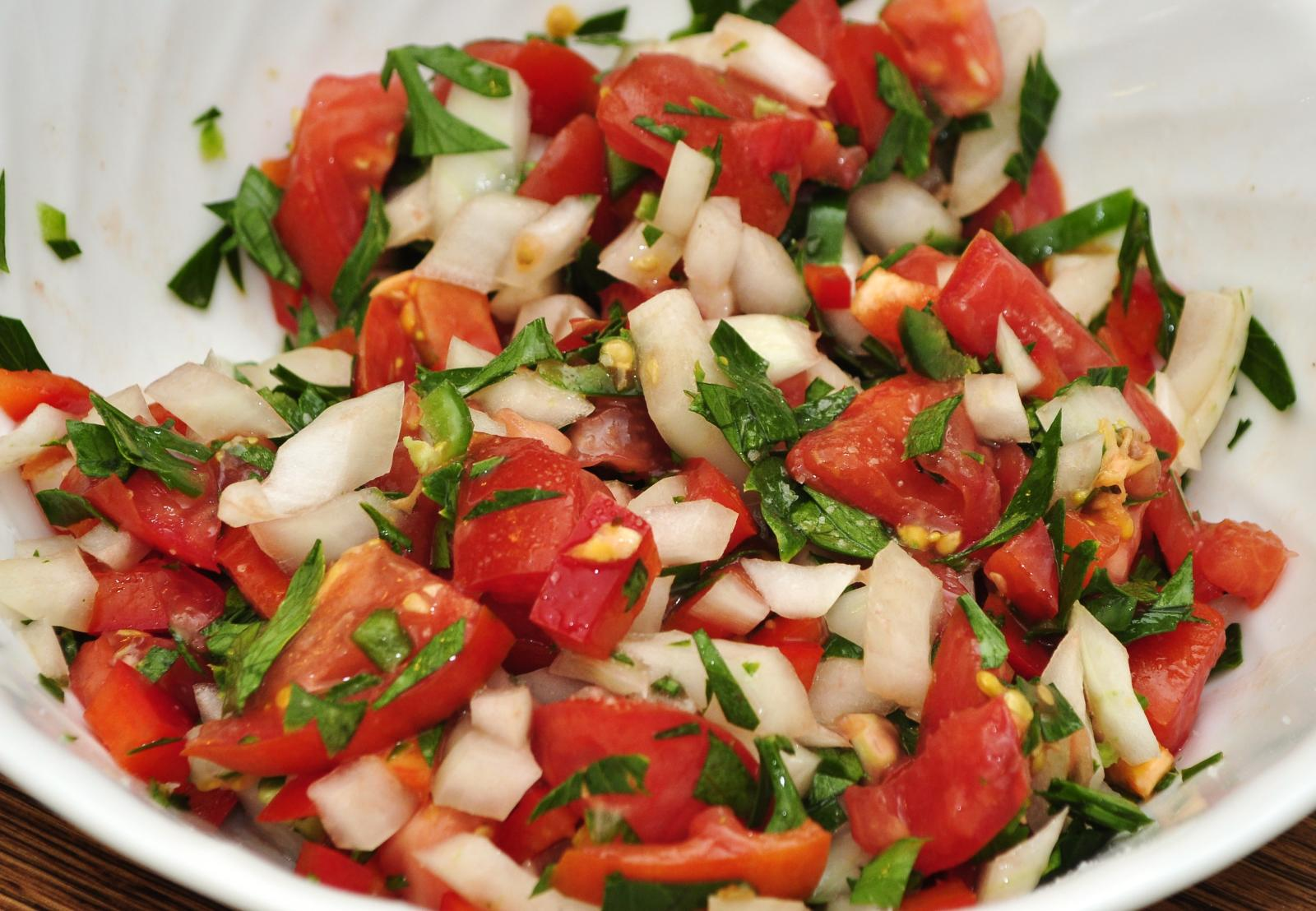
Pico de gallo made with tomato, onion, and cilantro/coriander

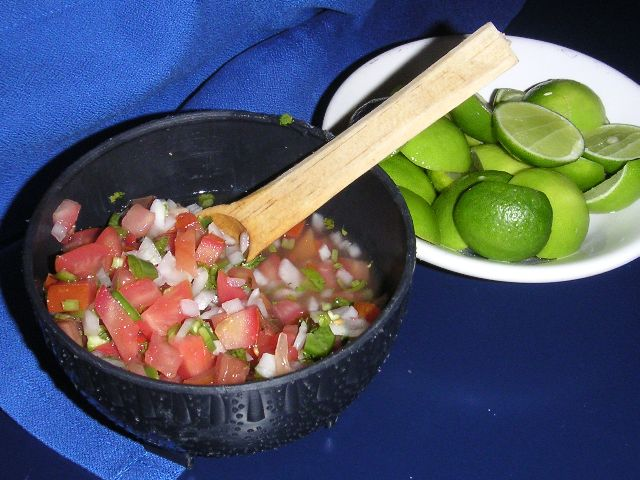
Limes sometimes accompany the sauce.

Pico de gallo (Spanish: [ˈpiko ðe ˈɣaʝo]; lit. 'rooster's beak'), also called salsa fresca ('fresh sauce'), salsa cruda ('raw sauce'), or just pico, is a type of salsa commonly used in Mexican cuisine. It is traditionally made from chopped tomato, onion, and serrano peppers (jalapeños or habaneros may be used as alternatives), with salt, lime juice, and cilantro.

Pico de gallo can be used in much the same way as Mexican liquid salsas. Because it contains less liquid, it also can be used as a main ingredient in dishes such as tacos and fajitas.

The tomato-based variety is widely known as salsa picada ('minced/chopped sauce'). In Mexico it is normally called salsa mexicana ('Mexican sauce'). Because the colors of the red tomato, white onion, and green chili and cilantro are reminiscent of the colors of the Mexican flag, it is also called salsa bandera ('flag sauce').

In many regions of Mexico the term pico de gallo describes any of a variety of salads (including fruit salads), salsa, or fillings made with tomato, tomatillo, avocado, orange, jícama, cucumber, papaya, or mild chilies. The ingredients are tossed in lime juice and optionally with either hot sauce or chamoy, then sprinkled with a salty chili powder.

== Etymology ==
Many native residents of the Sonoran Mexico region say that the salsa is named after the serrano pepper's resemblance to a rooster's beak in shape. Food writer Sharon Tyler Herbst attributes the name to the dish originally being eaten by pinching pieces between the thumb and forefinger. Food writers Rick Bayless and Deann Groen speculate that the name might reference the dish's resemblance to bird-feed in texture and appearance.

== Similar dishes ==
- Afghan salad
- Arab salad
- Çoban salatası from Turkey
- Greek salad
- Israeli salad
- Kachumbari from East Africa
- Kachumber from India
- Serbian salad
- Shirazi salad from Iran
- Shopska salad from Bulgaria

== See also ==
- List of Mexican dishes
- List of tomato dishes
- Dabu-dabu
- Lomi salmon
- Pebre
- Salsa criolla
- Vinagrete
- Xnipec
