= Kachumber =

Indian and Pakistani salad dish

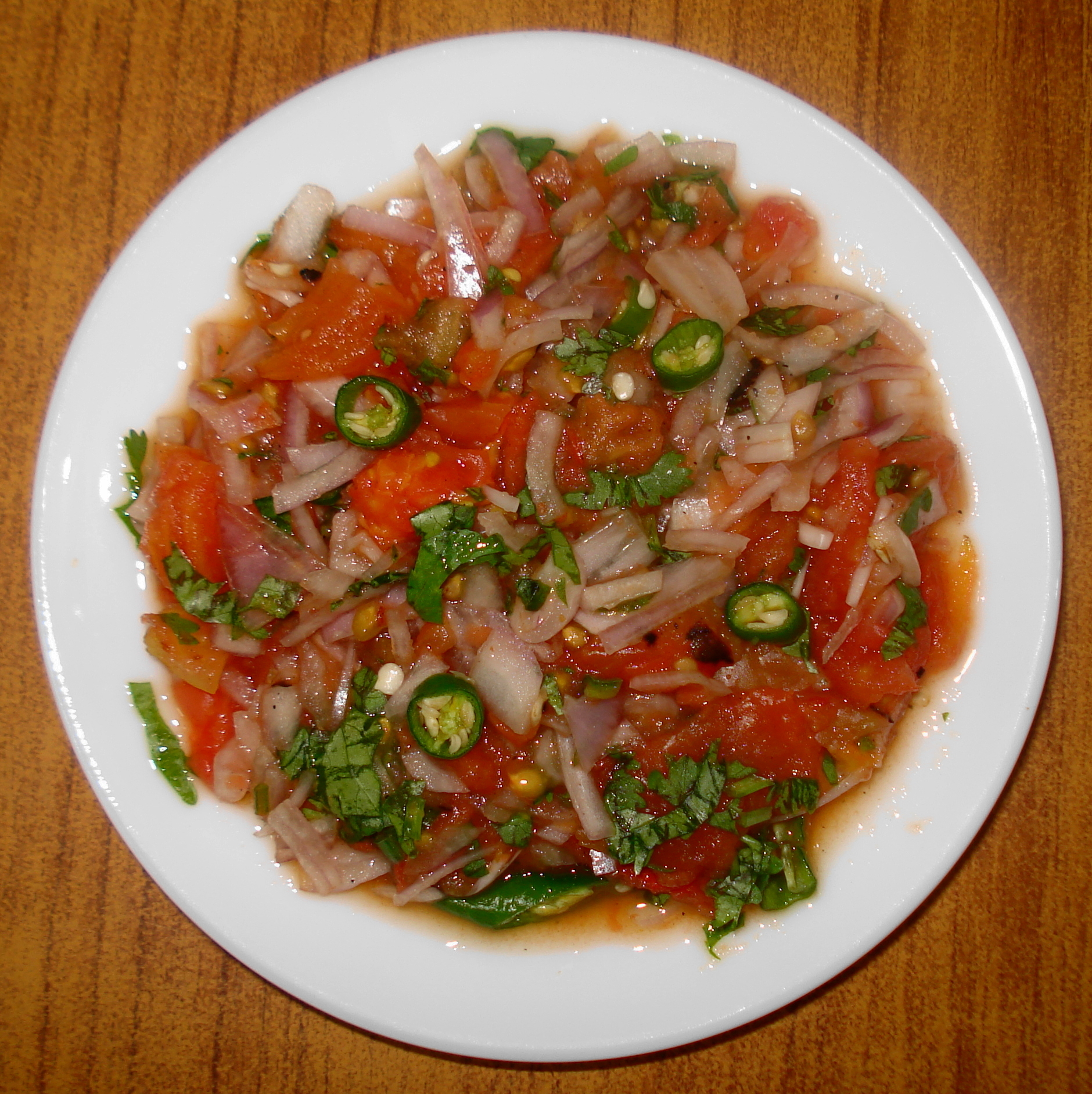
- Type: Salad
- Place of origin: India; Pakistan; Bangladesh
- Main ingredients: Tomatoes, cucumbers, onions, unripe mangoes, and chili peppers
- Variations: Kosambari; Singju

Kachumber, or cachumber, is a salad dish in South Asian cuisine consisting of fresh chopped tomatoes, cucumbers, onions, unripe mangoes, coriander leaves, lemon juice, and sometimes, chili peppers.

Kachumber is one of several salads which are common in the region. Others include the salad of Southern India known as kosambari and the salad of Northeast India known as singju. Sometimes, cucumber raita, a dish made with cucumber and curd, is also called kachumber.

== See also ==
=== South Asian salads ===
- Kosambari, a South Indian salad made with pulses
- Raita, a South Asian side dish made with yogurt
- Singju, a Northeastern Indian salad

=== Similar salads ===
- Afghan salad, a salad from Afghanistan
- Arab salad, a salad from the Arab world
- Armenian salad, a salad from Armenia
- Çoban salatası, a salad from Turkey
- Greek salad, a salad from Greece
- Israeli salad, a salad from Israel
- Kachumbari, a salad from East Africa
- Pico de gallo, a salsa from Mexico
- Serbian salad, a salad from Serbia
- Shirazi salad, a salad from Iran
- Shopska salad, a salad from Bulgaria
