= Kosambari =

Seasoned split pulses salad

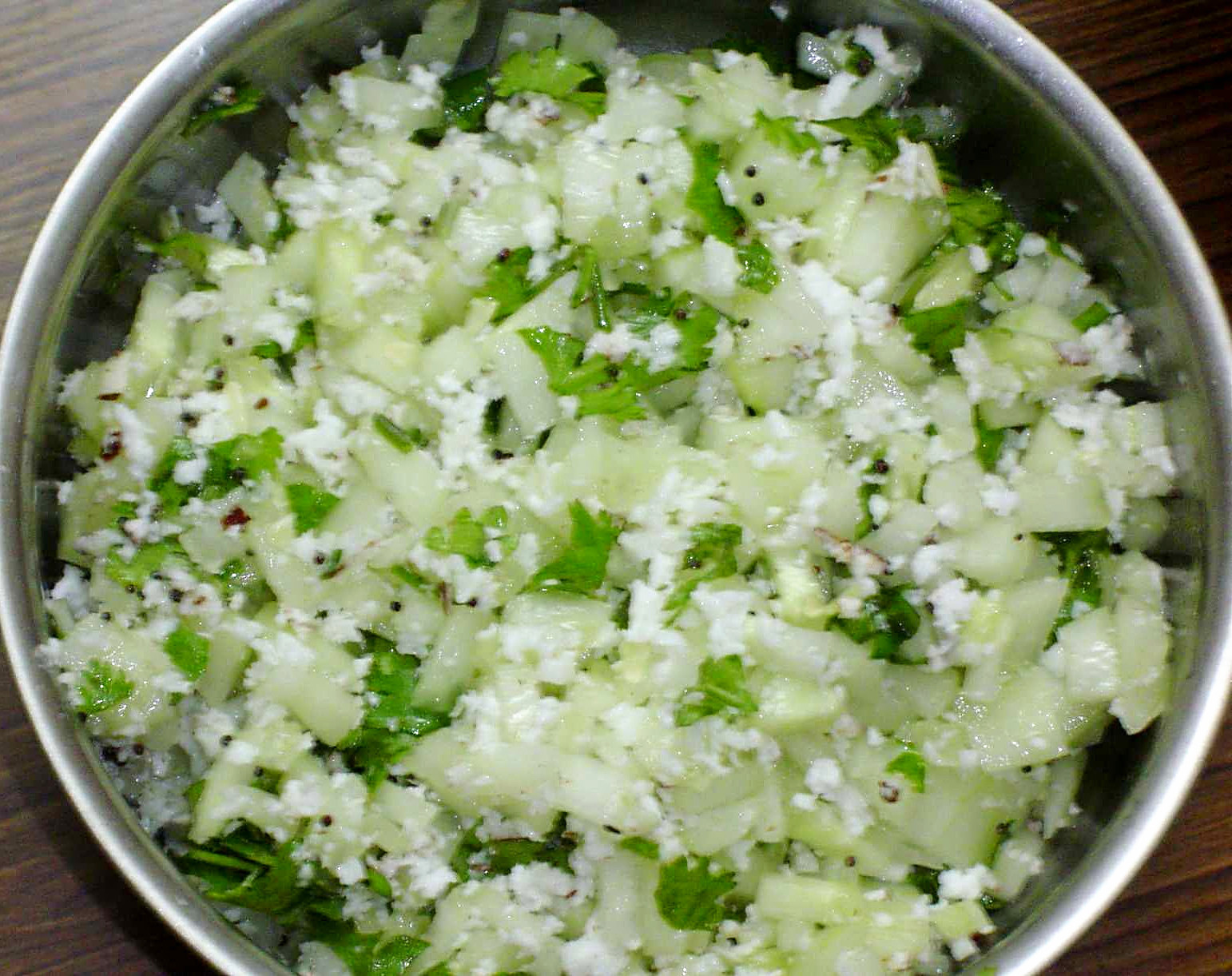
- Alternative names: Koshambari, Kosumalli
- Type: Salad
- Place of origin: India
- Region or state: South India
- Main ingredients: Cucumber, soaked Pulses, mustard seeds
- Variations: Kachumber; Singju

Kosambari, Kosumalli or Koshambari is a typical South Indian salad made from pulses (split legumes), cucumber and seasoned with mustard seeds. The pulses generally used are split mung beans (hesaru bele in Kannada). These salads are sometimes eaten as snacks, but usually as a part of full course meal. Its regional variation in northern India is known as kachumber while in northeastern India, it is known as singju.

== Ingredients ==
Traditionally, kosambari is made of cucumber, mung bean, and coriander. Optionally, ash gourd, green mango, and carrots are also used in some recipes. Kosambari is tempered with sesame oil, mustard seeds, curry leaves, lemon juice, salt and asafoetida for seasoning. Kosambari is also made from split chickpea. In Tamil Nadu, Kosumalli is made with Cucumber, Carrot or Banana Stem.

== Tradition ==
Kosambari is distributed during festivals and on special occasions. It is distributed to masses during Ganesha Chaturthi and Sri Rama Navami. During Varamahalakshmi and Gowri festivals women invite each other and exchange kosambari along with turmeric and vermilion to celebrate divinity in the feminine.

== Gallery ==
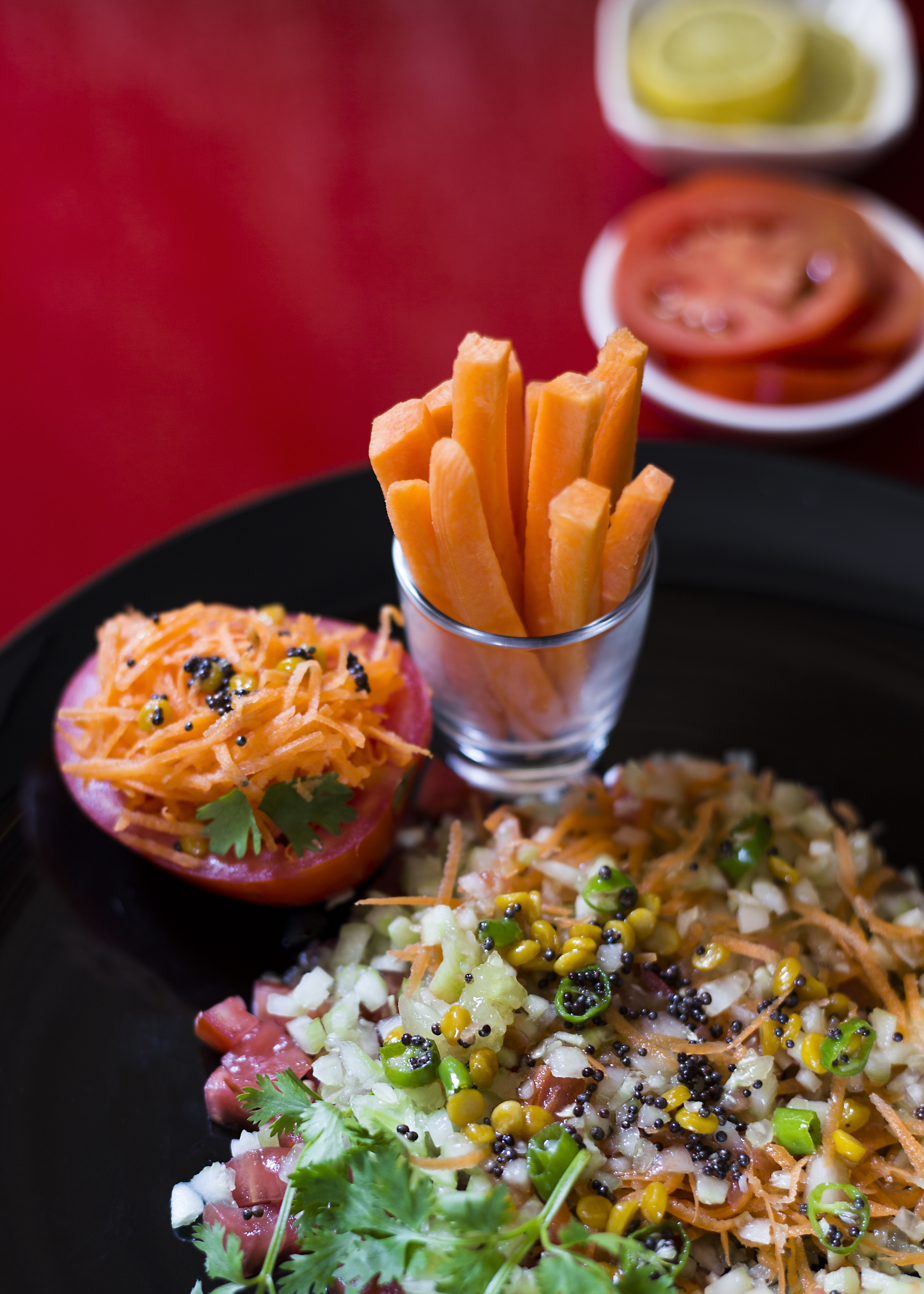
Mixed salad (Kosambri or Kachumber)

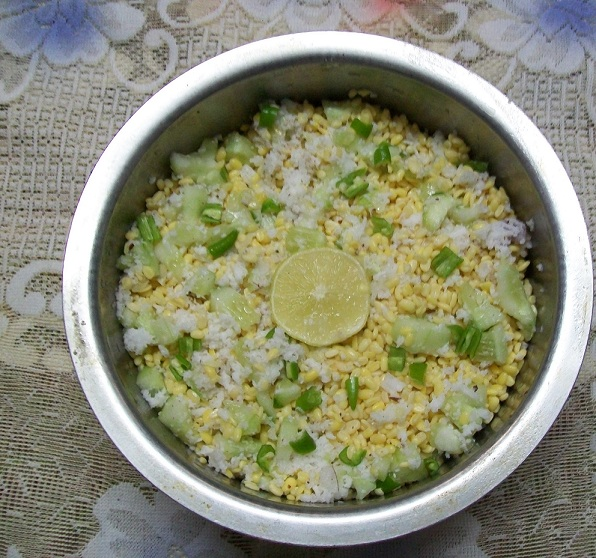
Moong dal kosambari

== See also ==
- List of salads
