= Serbian salad =

Balkan vegetable salad

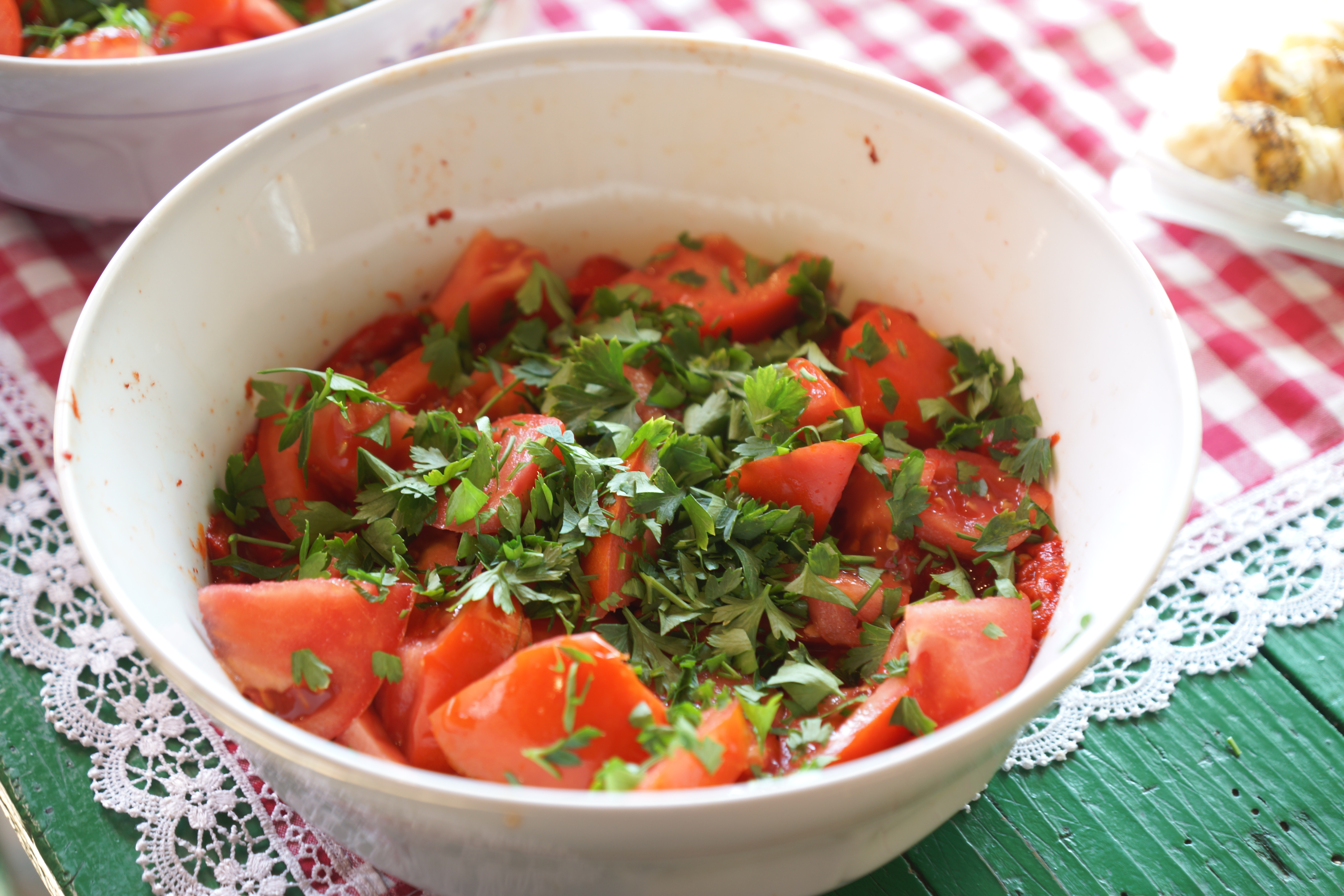
- Serbian salad
- Type: Salad
- Place of origin: Serbia
- Main ingredients: Tomatoes, cucumbers, onions, sunflower oil or olive oil, salt, feferon (variety of hot pepper similar to cayenne pepper)

Serbian salad (Serbian: Српска салата / Srpska salata) is a vegetable salad, usually served during summer with roast meat and other dishes. It is made from diced fresh tomatoes, cucumber and onions, usually seasoned with sunflower oil or olive oil, salt and commonly with a variety of hot pepper similar to cayenne pepper and called feferon. It is similar to the traditional salads of other Balkan countries and the Eastern Mediterranean, such as shopska salad, Greek salad, Arab salad, and Turkish shepherd's salad.

== See also ==
- Afghan salad, a similar salad from Afghanistan
- Arab salad, a similar salad from the Arab world
- Armenian salad, a similar salad from Armenia
- Çoban salatası, a similar salad from Turkey
- Greek salad, a similar salad from Greece
- Israeli salad, a similar salad from Israel
- Kachumbari, a similar salad from East Africa
- Kachumber, a similar salad from India
- Pico de gallo, a similar salsa from Mexico
- Shirazi salad, a similar salad from Iran
- Shopska salad, a similar salad from Bulgaria
