= Xnipek =

Spicy sauce native to Yucatán peninsula

Xnipec
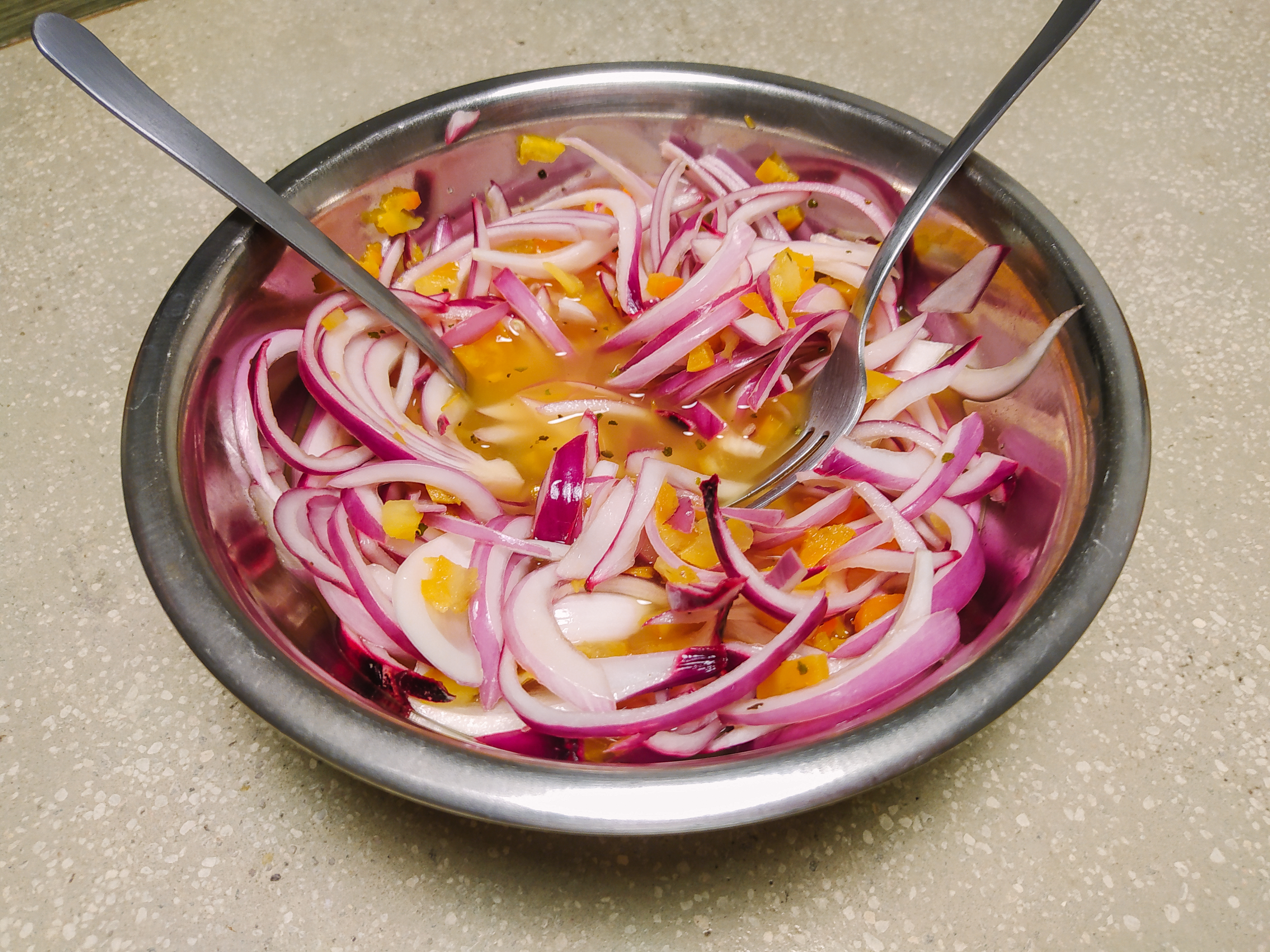
- Type: Mexican sauce
- Place of origin: Mexico
- Associated cuisine: Cuisine of Yucatán
- Main ingredients: habanero pepper · orange juice · onion

Xnipec (Mayan pronunciation: [ʃni'pek]; meaning 'dog snout') is a spicy sauce native to the Yucatán peninsula, made with habanero pepper, purple onion, bitter orange juice and salt. Sometimes oregano, vinegar, bay leaf, coriander or pepper are also used. If sweet orange is used, lemon juice can be added to acidify it; if sour orange is used, it is not necessary.

It is also called in a generic way Yucatecan sauce (salsa yucateca) or pickled onions (cebollas encurtidas). Since the Mayan-Spanish transliteration is not standardized, the ways of writing are various; other common spellings are ixnipec, xnepec, xni'pek, ni'peek, x-ni-pec, xnepek, etc., where peek means 'dog' and ni means 'nose'.

It is similar to another very popular sauce in Mexico, pico de gallo, and it is common in the peninsular cuisine, where it is used regularly to accompany various typical dishes, including chocolomo, salpicón, poc chuc, and tikin xic. It is the traditional accompaniment to cochinita pibil, as well as panuchos.

The habanero chili is considered one of the hottest according to the Scoville scale, although the amount of chili added is to taste. Because it is so spicy, anyone who dares to try it is warned that their nose will sweat like a dog's, hence its name.
