= Afghan salad =

Afghan cuisine

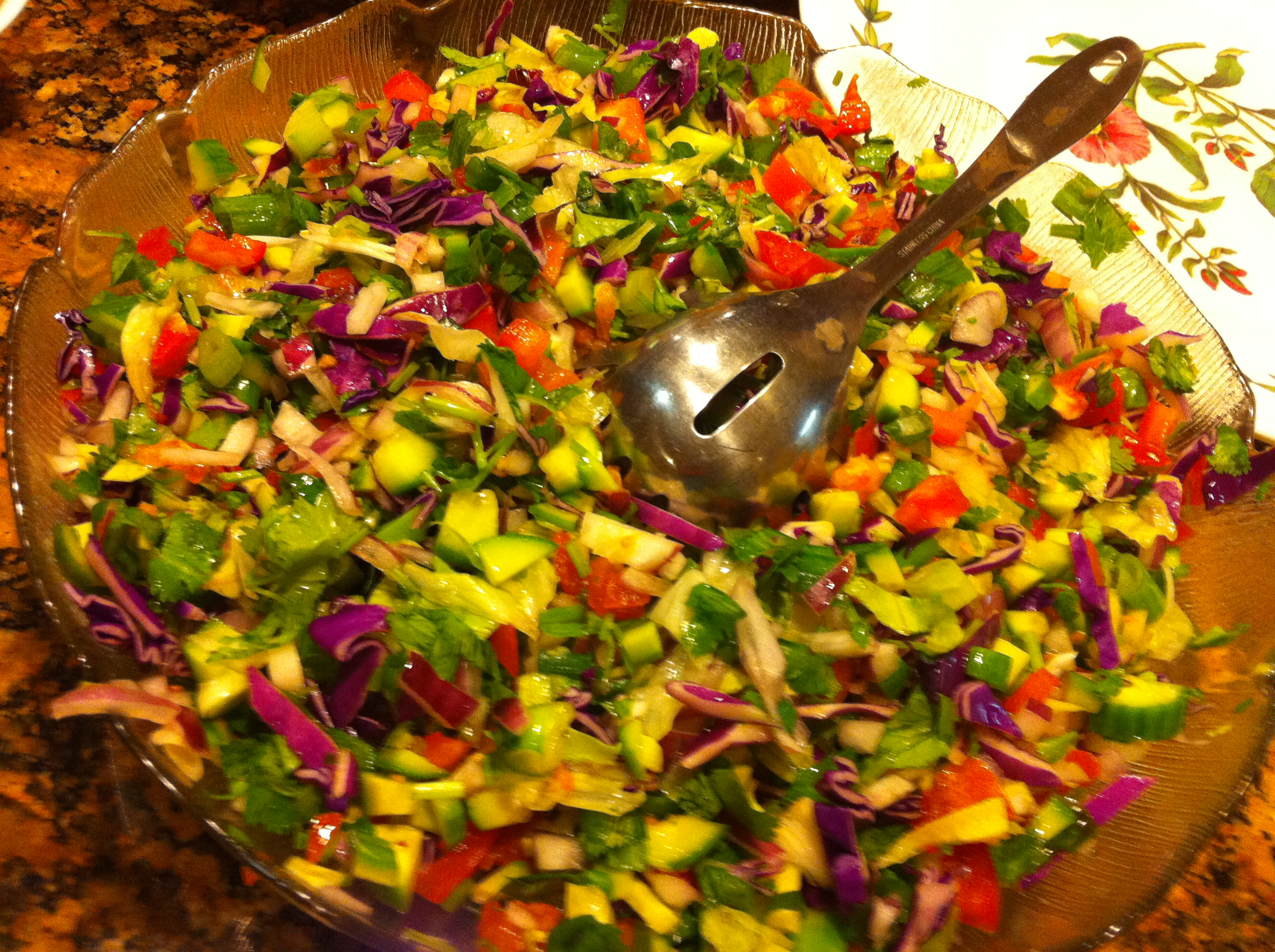
An Afghan salad prepared with tomato, cucumber, onion and many additional ingredients

Afghan salad is a salad in Afghan cuisine that is prepared with the primary ingredients of diced tomato, cucumber, onion, carrot, cilantro, mint and lime or sometimes lemon juice. Salt and pepper may be used to season the dish. Additional ingredients may be used, such as bell peppers, parsley, radish and herbs, among others.

== See also ==
- Arab salad, a similar salad from the Arab world
- Armenian salad, a similar salad from Armenia
- Çoban salatası, a similar salad from Turkey
- Greek salad, a similar salad from Greece
- Israeli salad, a similar salad from Israel
- Kachumbari, a similar salad from East Africa
- Kachumber, a similar salad from India
- Pico de gallo, a similar salsa from Mexico
- Serbian salad, a similar salad from Serbia
- Shirazi salad, a similar salad from Iran
- Shopska salad, a similar salad from Bulgaria
- List of salads
