= Arab salad =

Salad dishes within Arabic cuisine

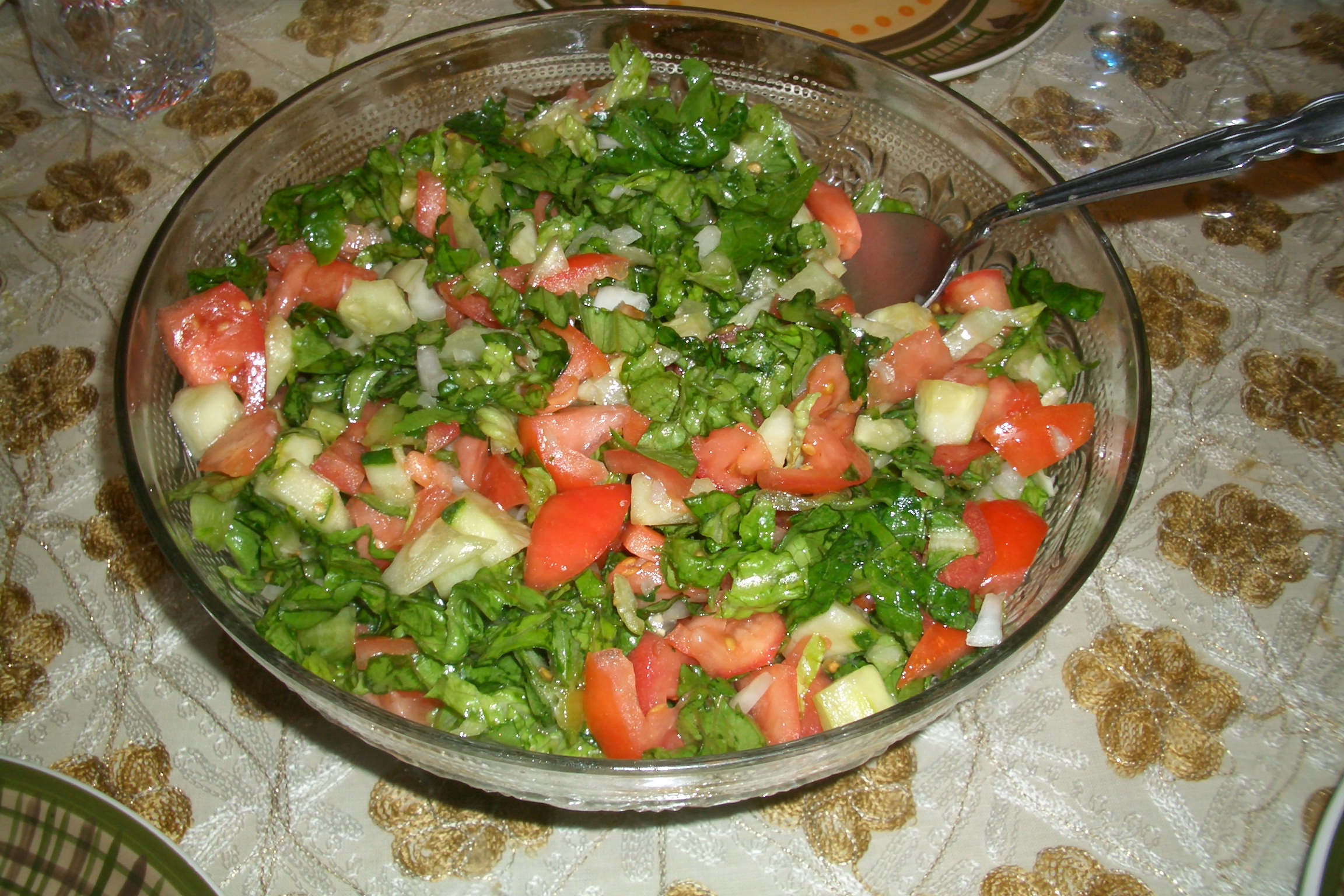
- Type: Salad
- Course: Mezze
- Main ingredients: Vegetables, spices

Arab salad or Arabic salad is any of a variety of salad dishes that form part of Arab cuisine. Combining many different fruits and spices, and often served as part of a mezze, Arab salads include those from Libya and Tunisia such as the "Tunisian salad" and "black olive and orange salad" (salatat zaytoon) and from Tunisia salata machwiya is a grilled salad made from peppers, tomatoes, garlic and onions with olives and tuna on top, those from Syria and Lebanon such as "artichoke salad" (salataf khurshoof) and "beet salad" (salatat shamandar), and those from Palestine and Jordan. Other popular Arab salads eaten throughout the Arab world include fattoush and tabouli.

A recipe for Arab salad in Woman's Day magazine includes diced tomato, cucumber and onion. Often mixed with fresh parsley, mint, basil, or thyme and combined with the juice of freshly squeezed lemon and olive oil, Arabic salad contains no lettuce. All the vegetables, except the onion, are left unpeeled, and the salad should be served immediately. Other variations include serving with fried pita slices or adding sumac to the lemon and oil dressing.

== Regional variations ==
=== Syria ===
Shʿifurah is a Syrian salad typically made from crumbled shanklish, chopped tomatoes and onions, and other ingredients. It is also called "shanklish salad" and is popular elsewhere in the Levant.

=== Palestine ===
Among Palestinians, this Arabic salad is known as Salatat al-Bundura ("tomato salad") and is popularly served alongside rice dishes. It is also called salata falahiyeh (Levantine Arabic: سلطة فلاحية, lit. 'farmers salad'), or "finely chopped salad". A version with tahini dressing is also popular. Dagga is a salad popular in the Gaza Strip, made in a mortar and pestle from dill seeds, chilies, and tomatoes.

=== Egypt ===
Salata baladi is an Egyptian salad made with cucumber, tomato, mint, onions, and vinegar.

== Similar dishes ==
Similar salads in the Middle East include the Persian salad shirazi, Israeli salad, Turkish choban salad and Greek salad.

== See also ==
- Afghan salad, a similar salad from Afghanistan
- Çoban salatası, a similar salad from Turkey
- Greek salad, a similar salad from Greece
- Israeli salad, a similar salad from Israel
- Kachumbari, a similar salad from East Africa
- Kachumber, a similar salad from India
- Pico de gallo, a similar salsa from Mexico
- Salata baladi, a similar salad from Egypt
- Serbian salad, a similar salad from Serbia
- Shirazi salad, a similar salad from Iran
- Shopska salad, a similar salad from Bulgaria
- List of Arabic salads
- List of hors d'oeuvre

== Bibliography ==
- Farsoun, Samih K. (2004), Culture and Customs of the Palestinians (Illustrated ed.), Greenwood Publishing Group, ISBN 978-0-313-32051-4
- Salloum, Habeeb; Peters, James; Cassidy, Neal (1997), From the Lands of Figs and Olives: Over 300 Delicious and Unusual Recipes from the Middle East and North Africa (Illustrated ed.), I.B.Tauris, ISBN 978-1-86064-038-4
- Shulman, Martha Rose (2007), Mediterranean Harvest: Vegetarian Recipes from the World's Healthiest Cuisine (Illustrated ed.), Rodale, ISBN 978-1-59486-234-2
- Wright, Clifford A. (2001), Mediterranean Vegetables: A Cook's ABC of Vegetables and Their Preparation in Spain, France, Italy, Greece, Turkey, the Middle East, and North Africa with More Than 200 Authentic Recipes for the Home Cook (Illustrated ed.), Harvard Common Press, ISBN 978-1-55832-196-0
