= Greek salad =

Salad of tomatoes, cucumbers, and feta

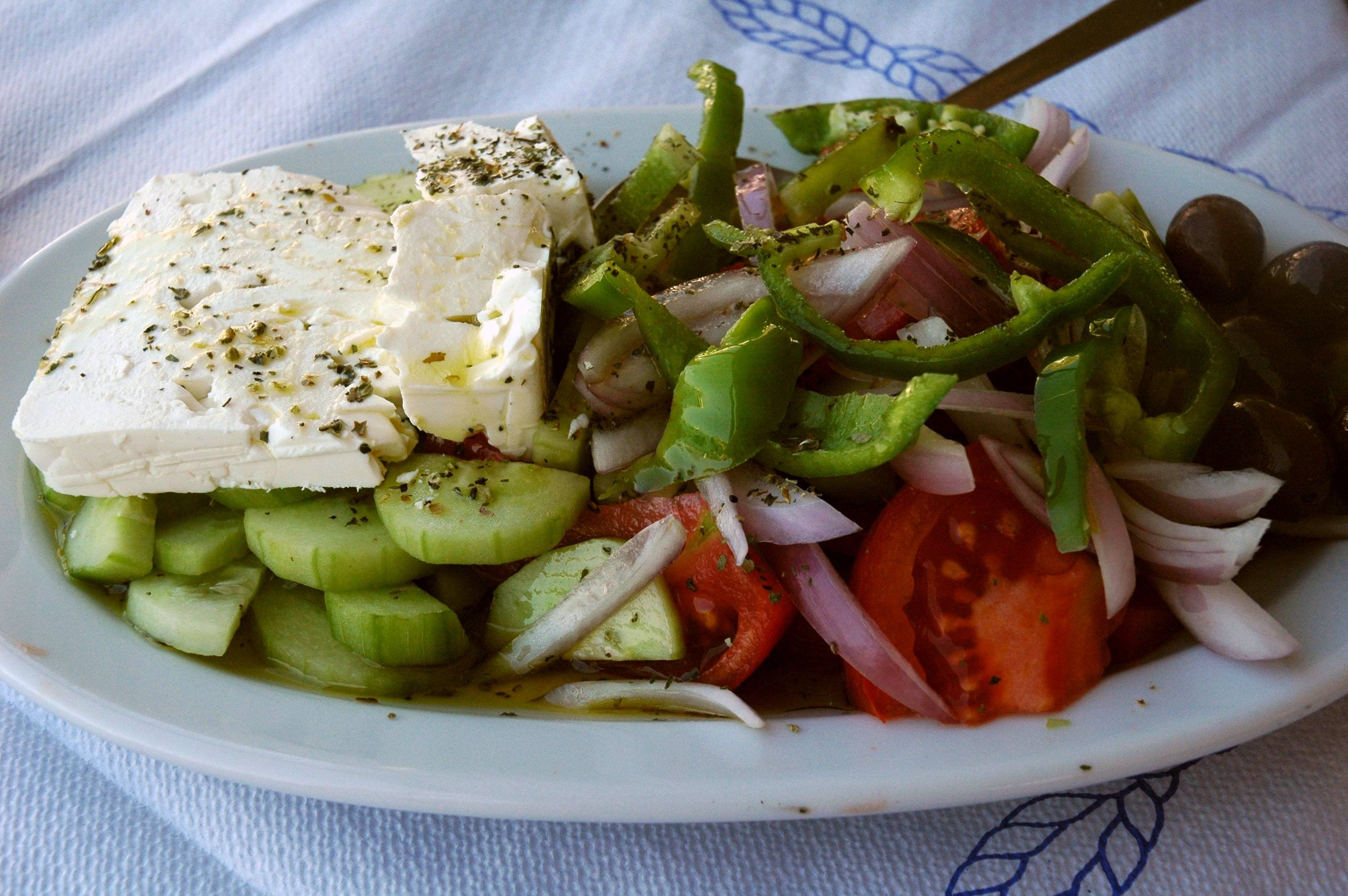
- Horiatiki salad with feta cheese as served on Hydra Island, where cucumber is peeled. In other regions, cucumbers are left unpeeled.
- Place of origin: Greece
- Region or state: Greece; Cyprus
- Created by: Greeks
- Main ingredients: Tomatoes, cucumbers, onions, feta cheese, olives (usually Kalamata olives), salt, oregano, olive oil

Greek salad, choriatiki (Note: Romanized chōriátiki saláta, pronounced [xorˈʝatici saˈlata], lit. 'village salad' or 'rustic salad'.) or Horiatiki (Note: Pronounced /ˌhɔːriəˈtiːki/ HOR-ee-ə-TEE-kee in British English, /ˌhɔːriˈɑːtɪki/ HOR-ee-AH-tik-ee in American English.) (Greek: χωριάτικη σαλάτα (Note: Romanized chōriátiki saláta, pronounced [xorˈʝatici saˈlata], lit. 'village salad' or 'rustic salad'.) or θερινή σαλάτα (Note: Romanized theriní saláta, pronounced [θeriˈni saˈlata], lit. 'summer salad'.)) is a salad in Greek cuisine generally made with pieces of tomatoes, cucumbers, onion, feta cheese, and olives (typically Kalamata olives) and dressed with salt, Greek oregano, and olive oil. Common additions include lemon juice, green bell pepper, caper berries (especially on the Cyclades islands), and mint or parsley for decoration (mainly in Northern Greece). Greek salad is often imagined as a farmer's breakfast or lunch, as its ingredients resemble those that a Greek farmer might have on hand.

== In Greece ==
=== Preparation and Serving ===
The tomatoes are commonly cut into symmetrical wedge-shaped pieces, while the cucumber, onion and green pepper are cut into thin slices. The feta cheese, olives, olive oil, salt, and Greek oregano are then added. It is conventionally left unmixed prior to serving.

=== Consumption ===
The salad is consumed either from the same plate or, after mixing, is shared among diners.

A substantial quantity of juice from the tomatoes and other vegetables, as well as olive oil, often remains on the plate or plates after the salad has been consumed. Particularly in informal settings, bread is not uncommonly dipped into this juice-and-oil mixture.

== Outside Greece ==
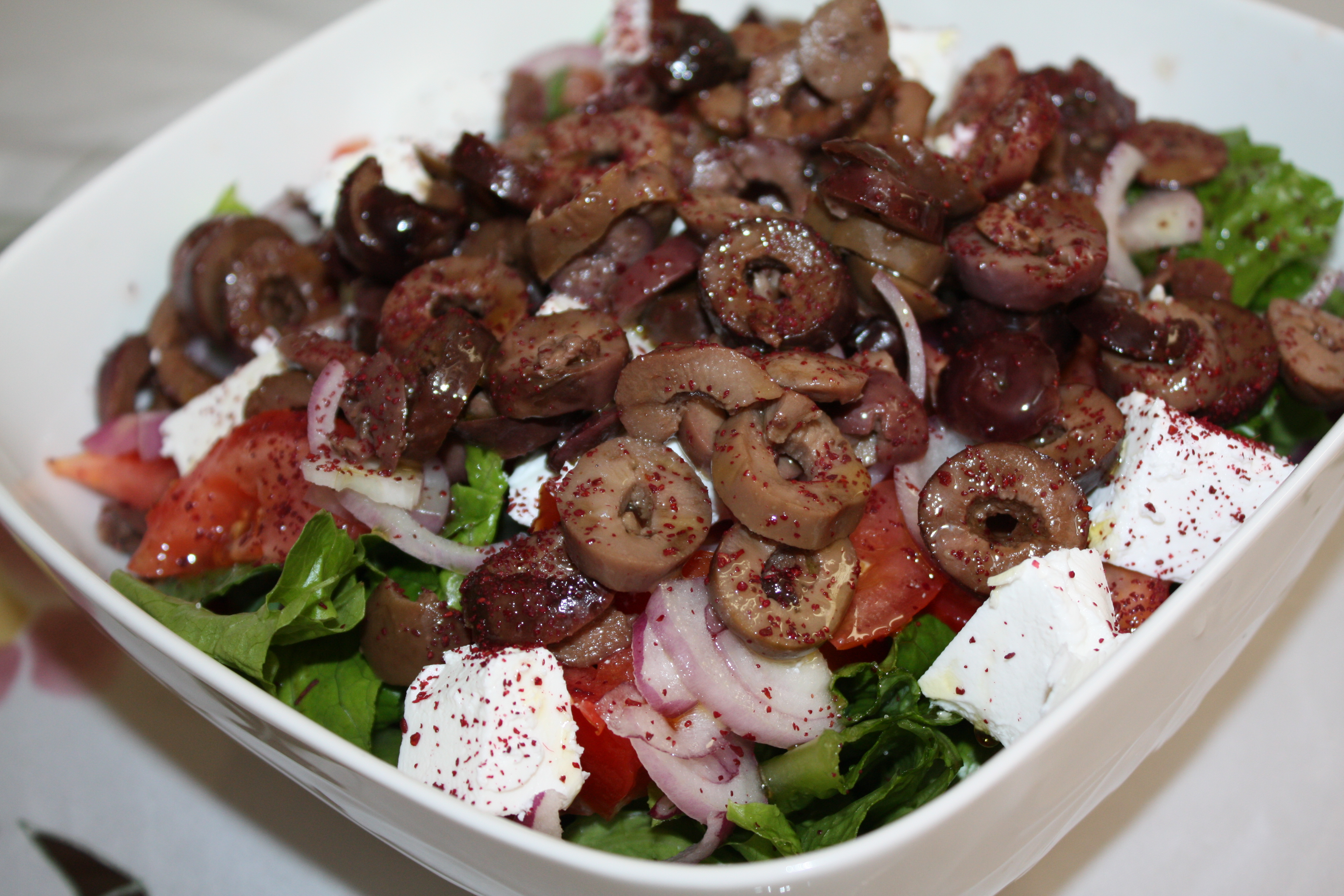
An American-style Greek salad with lettuce

Outside Greece, "Greek salad" may be a lettuce salad with Greek-inspired ingredients, even though the original dish is distinguished by the absence of lettuce. Meanwhile, the variant without lettuce may be called horiatiki, 'peasant salad', or 'village salad'. However, in most European countries, including the UK, the dish broadly resembles the original.

In an American-style Greek salad, lettuce, tomatoes, feta (often served in multiple cube-shaped cuttings mixed with the vegetables), and olives are the most standard elements, but cucumbers, peperoncini (pickled hot peppers), bell peppers, onions, radishes, dolmades, and anchovies/sardines are common. Regional variants may include unusual components, e.g. in Detroit, beets, and in the Tampa Bay area, potato salad. Dressings containing various herbs and seasonings are frequently used in the U.S. These styles of Greek salad are rarely encountered in Greece.

Various other salads have also been called "Greek" in the English language in the last century, including some with no apparent connection to Greek cuisine. A 1925 Australian newspaper described a Greek salad of boiled squash dressed with sour milk; a 1934 American newspaper described a mayonnaise-dressed lettuce salad with shredded cabbage and carrots.

Some spreads and dips found in the meze of Greek cuisine are also called "salads" in Greek, such as melitzanosalata, taramasalata and tzatziki.

== Gallery ==
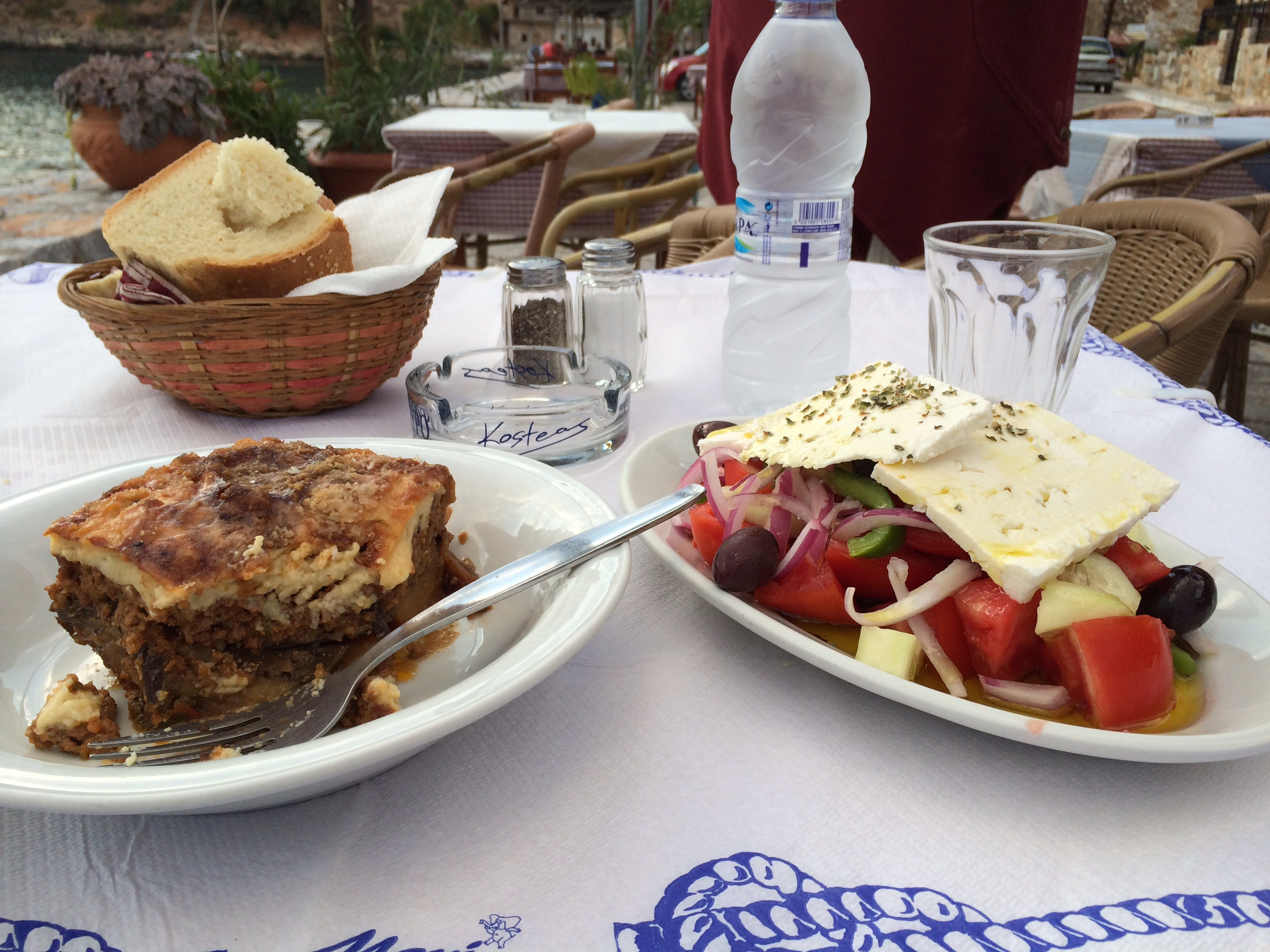
Horiatiki salad served with moussaka in Laconia, Peloponnesus

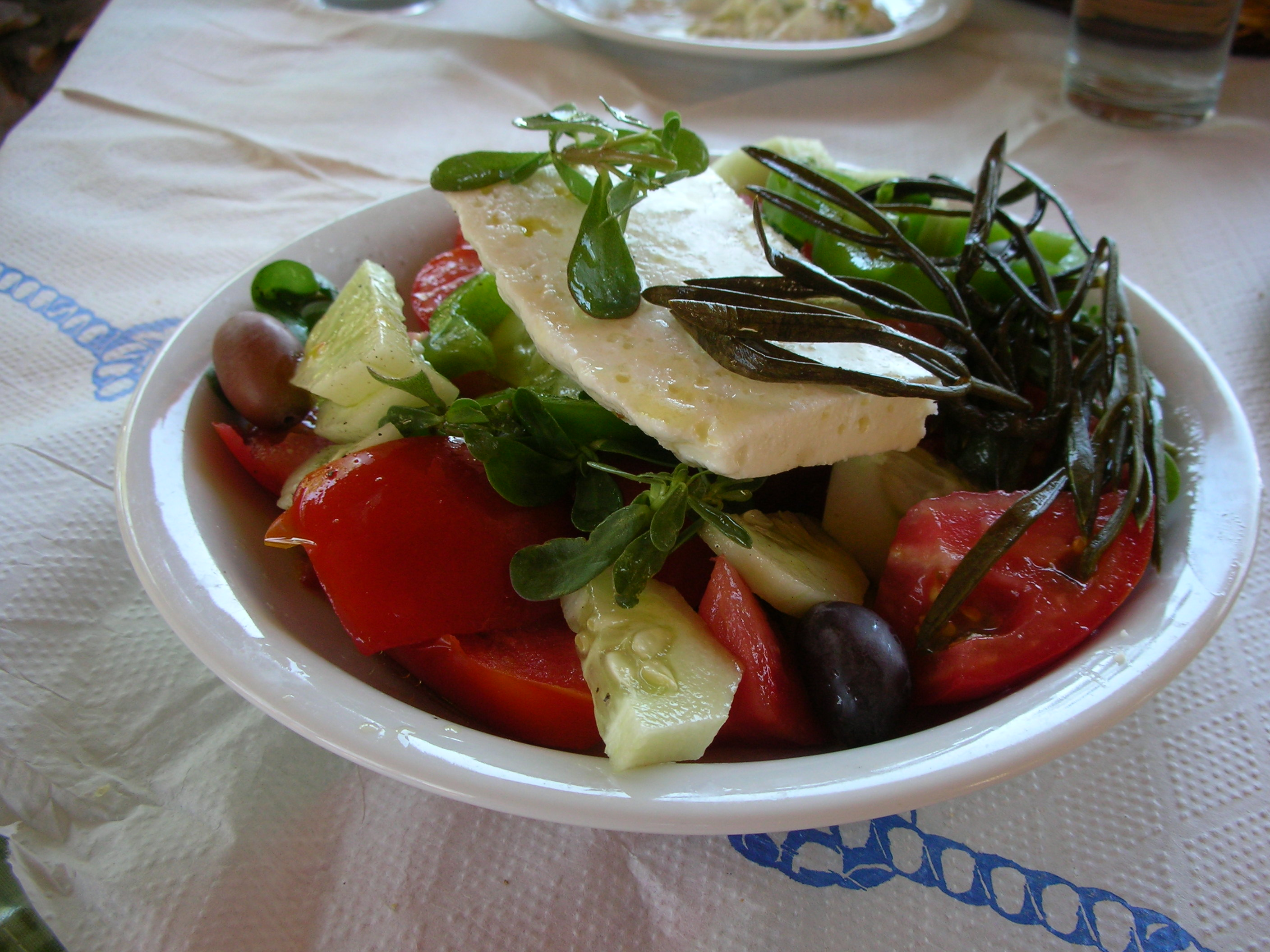
Horiatiki salad as served in the Dodecanese islands

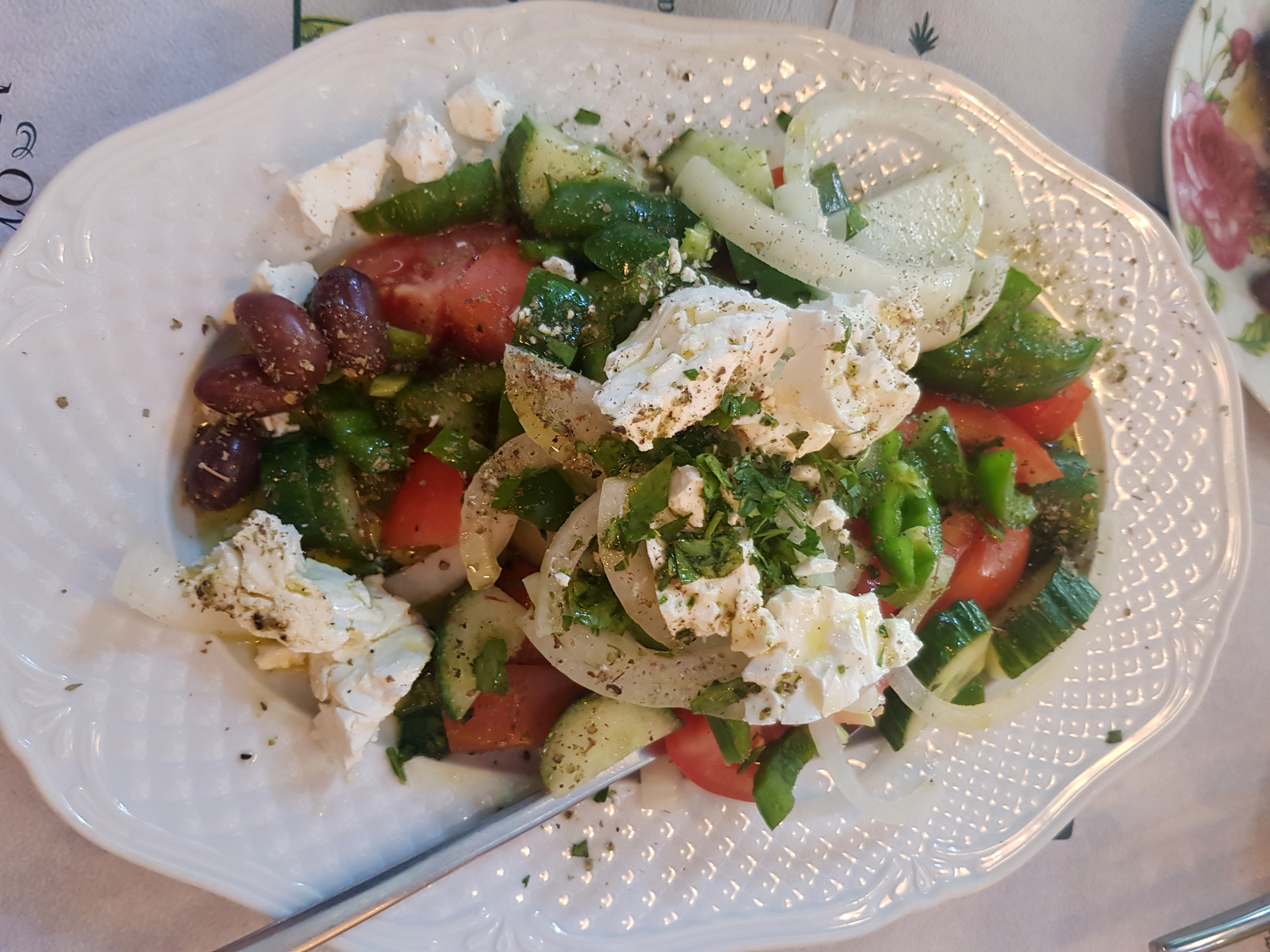
Greek salad in Thessaloniki

Greek salad in Oia, Santorini

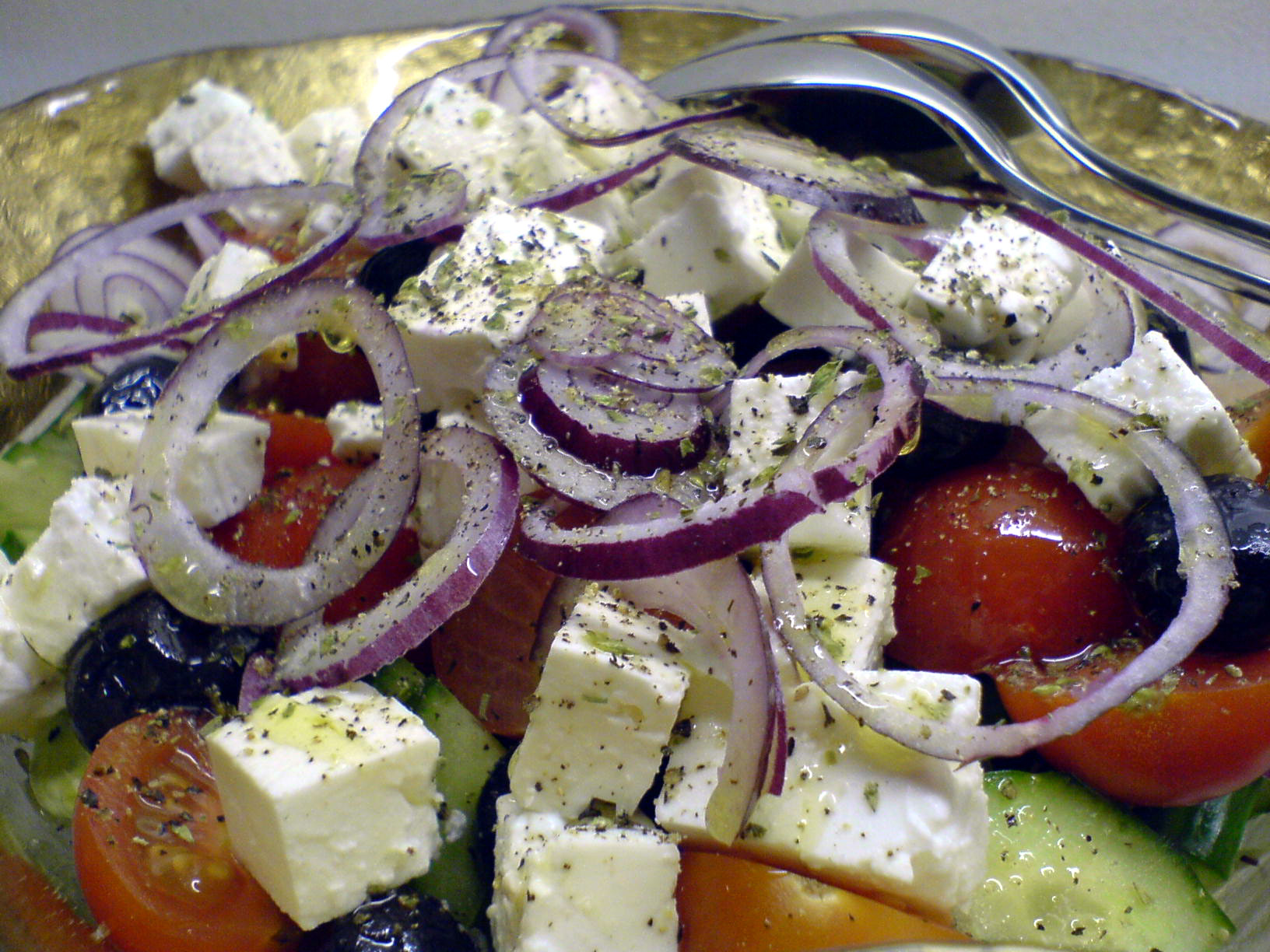
Greek salad as served in other countries. The main differences are the serving of the feta cheese in multiple cube-shaped cuttings instead of a single rectangular-piece and the more liberal supply of onion.

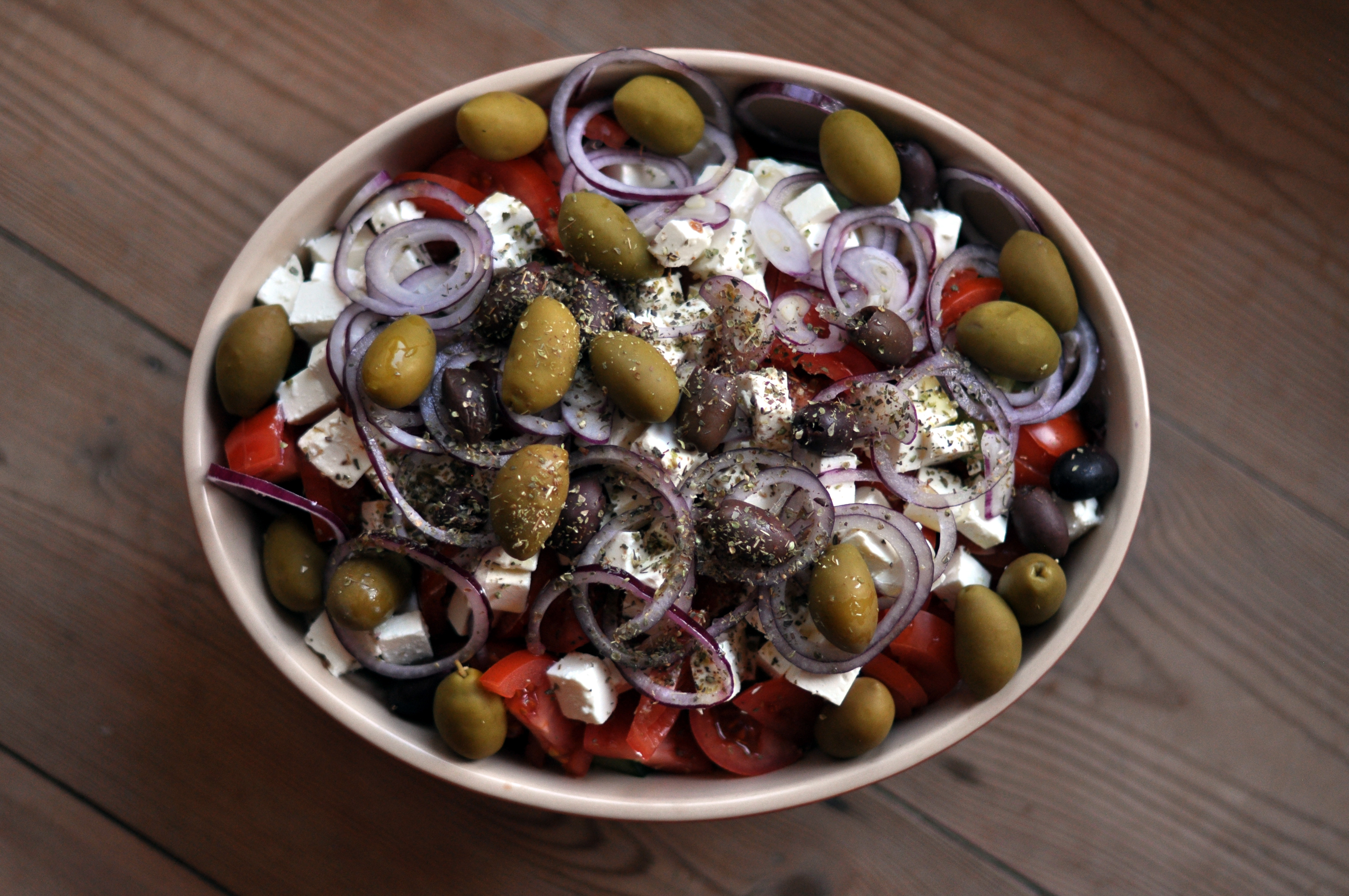
Greek-inspired salad as served in Copenhagen, Denmark

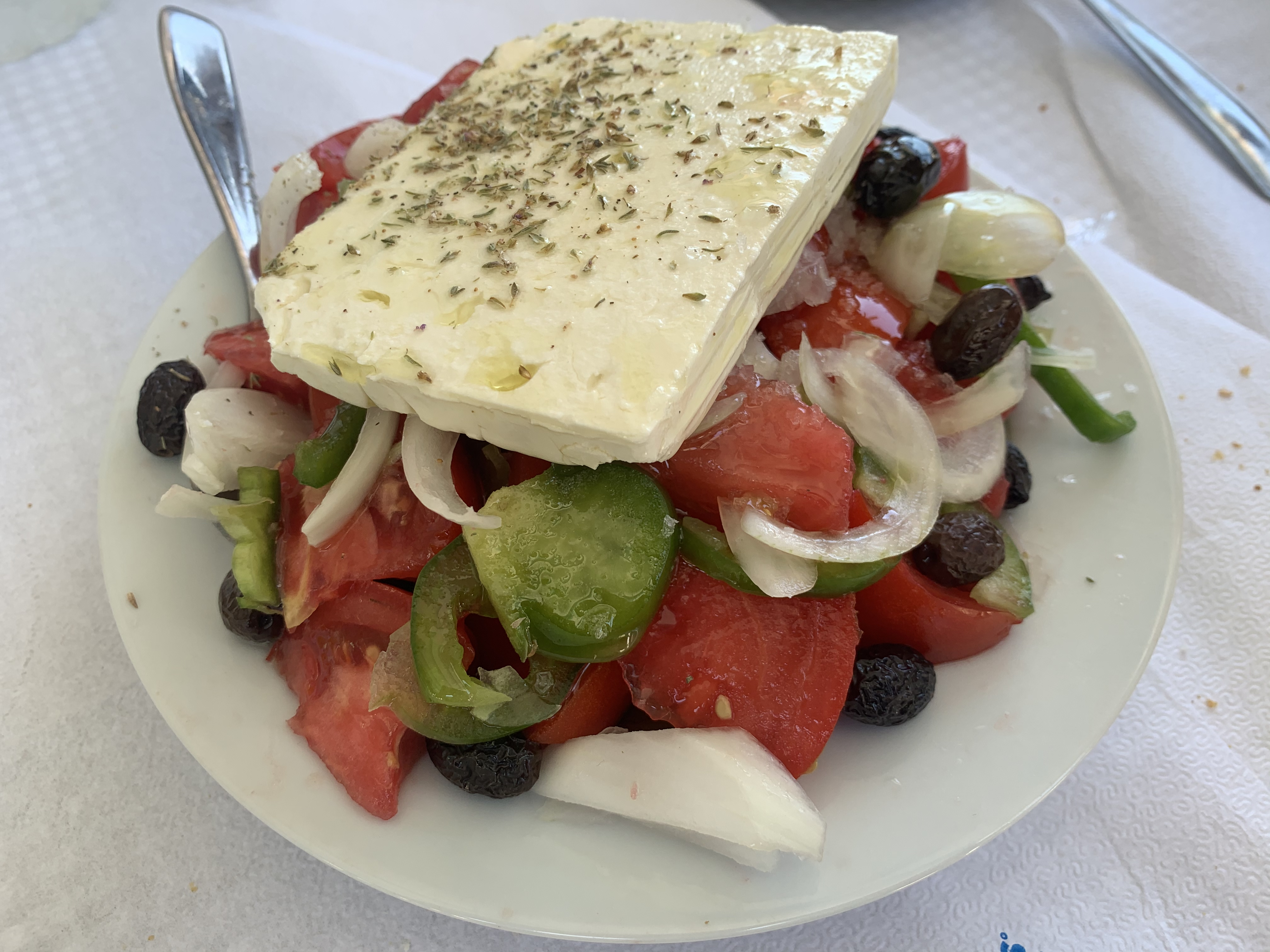

== See also ==
- Afghan salad, a similar salad from Afghanistan
- Arab salad, a similar salad from the Arab world
- Armenian salad, a similar salad from Armenia
- Çoban salatası, a similar salad from Turkey
- Israeli salad, a similar salad from Israel
- Kachumbari, a similar salad from East Africa
- Kachumber, a similar salad from India
- Pico de gallo, a similar salsa from Mexico
- Serbian salad, a similar salad from Serbia
- Shirazi salad, a similar salad from Iran
- Shopska salad, a similar salad from the Balkans
