= Verjuice =

Type of juice

- Alternative names: Verjus
- Type: Juice
- Course: Condiment
- Region or state: Western Europe, Middle East
- Main ingredients: Unripe grapes, crab-apples or other sour fruit
- Variations: White, red

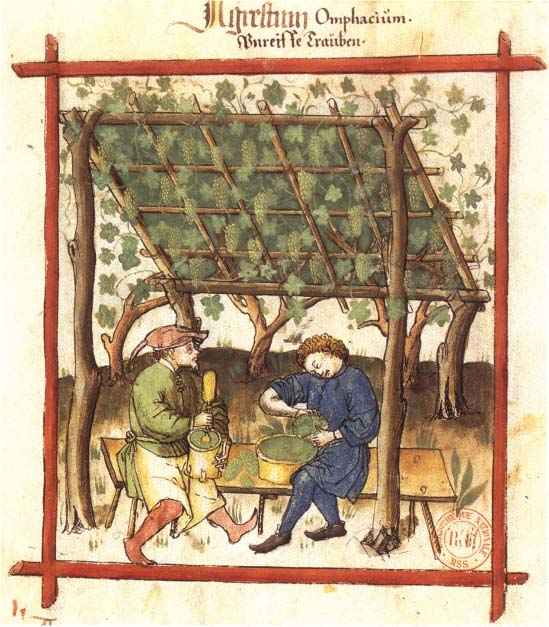
Picking green grapes for making verjuice. Tacuinum Sanitatis (1474). Paris, Bibliothèque nationale.

Verjuice is a highly acidic juice made by pressing unripe grapes, crab-apples or other sour fruit. Sometimes lemon or sorrel juice, herbs or spices are added to change the flavor. It also goes by the name verjus.

== Etymology ==
The word verjuice (/ˈvɜːrˌdʒuːs/ VUR-jooss) comes from the Middle French vert jus (lit. 'green juice'), which refers to its sour grape source. The authors of The Medieval Kitchen: Recipes from France and Italy (1998) write that the grape seeds preserved in salts were also called verjus during the Middle Ages.

== History ==
From the Middle Ages through the Renaissance, verjus was widely used all over Western Europe as an ingredient in sauces, as a condiment, or to deglaze preparations. The modern form of dijon mustard was established in 1856 when Jean Naigeon of Dijon replaced the vinegar usually used in prepared mustard with verjuice.

Verjus is called husroum (حصرم) in Arabic; it is used extensively in Lebanese and Syrian cuisine. Verjus is known as ab-ghooreh (آب‌غوره) in Persian, and it is used extensively in Persian cuisine, such as in Shirazi salad.

=== Modern resurgence ===
Maggie Beer, a South Australian cook, vintner and food writer, started commercial production in 1984, after a harvest of Rhine Riesling grapes could not be sold. She persuaded a winemaker who was a friend to assist her in turning the juice into verjuice. After slow national sales, 15 years later came international sales, that were then followed in France and elsewhere by local product. Niagara Oast House Brewers in Niagara-on-the-Lake, Ontario, Canada, developed a farmhouse ale around the use of local Niagara Pinot Noir Verjus, with the first release in fall 2015.

== Usage ==
Verjus comes in two colors, white and red. The red varies from gentle and floral, to rich and hearty; the white varies from light and mild, to tangy and aggressive.

It was once used in many contexts where modern cooks would use either wine or some variety of vinegar, but has become much less widely used as wines and variously flavored vinegars became more accessible. Nonetheless, it is still used in a number of dishes as well as in recipes from various cuisines, and can be purchased at some gourmet grocery stores or by local producers.

Modern cooks use verjuice most often in salad dressings as the acidic ingredient when wine is going to be served with the salad. This is because it provides a comparable sour taste component, yet without "competing with" (altering the taste of) the wine, the way vinegar or lemon juice would. Some people will drink verjus with sparkling water and ice, which tastes similar to lemonade.

In the Middle East, verjus is thought to have medicinal properties, and can help diagnose illnesses (as it relates to Iranian traditional medicine).

== See also ==
- Vinho Verde
