= Kachumbari =

Tomato-onion salad

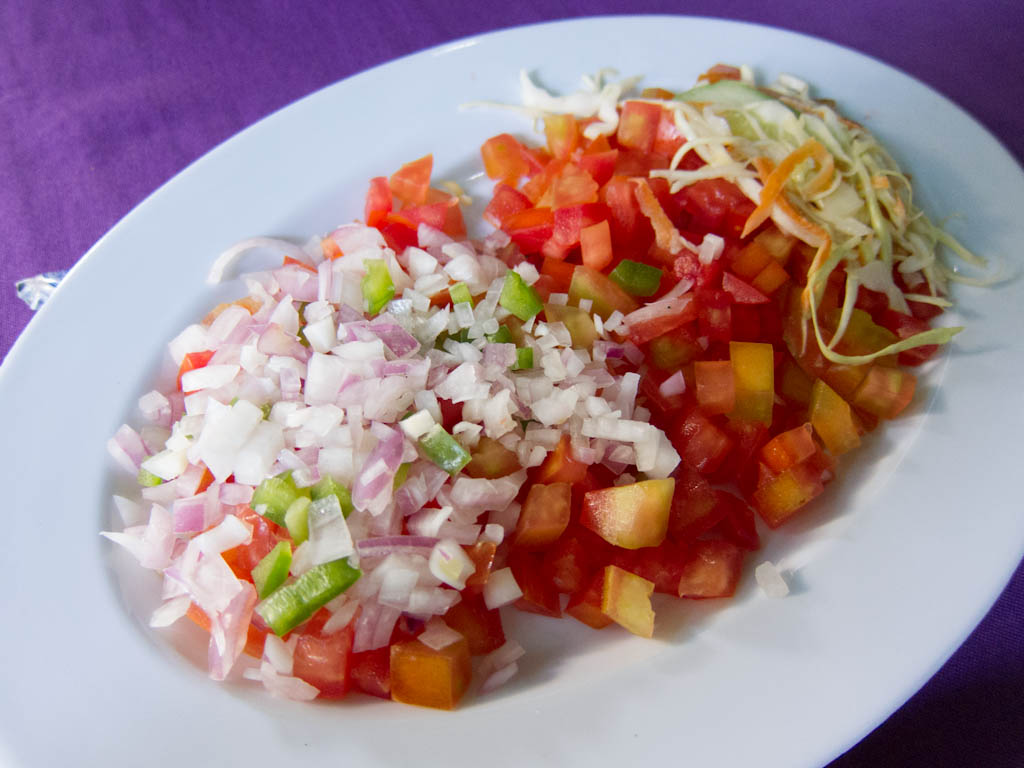
- Kachumbari
- Course: Salad
- Region or state: African Great Lakes
- Main ingredients: Tomato, onion
- Ingredients generally used: Chilli and salt
- Variations: Lime/lemon juice, coriander, parsley, cucumber, avocado, gin, vodka
- Similar dishes: Cachumber, Pico de gallo, Salsa fresca

Kachumbari is a fresh tomato and onion salad relish that is popular in the cuisines of the African Great Lakes region. It is an uncooked salad dish consisting of chopped tomatoes, onions, and chili peppers. Variations of kachumbari can be found in Kenya, Tanzania, Rwanda, Uganda, Burundi and in the Southern African countries of Malawi and Congo.

The Swahili word kachumbari originated from the Indian word cachumber. Kacuhumbali is made from raw sliced onions mixed with fresh raw tomatoes, sprinkles of lemon juice or vinegar and small pitches of table salt.

== Uses ==
Kachumbari is used as a salad side dish for a main meal. In Kenya, it is used as a condiment served with pilau (pilaf), mukimo, or a meal of nyama choma (roasted meat) and ugali. In Tanzania, it is eaten with rice pilau or biryani. In Malawi, it is usually eaten on its own like any other salad dish, while in Uganda it is normally eaten with nyama choma.

== Variations ==
Other ingredients, such as lime or lemon juice, fresh cilantro (coriander or dhania), parsley, avocado, or cucumber, and in some cases gin or vodka, can also be added. Some recipe variations also call for habanero or Scotch bonnet peppers, with a touch of ground cayenne pepper.

Kachumbari is popular throughout the African Great Lakes region and can be eaten with African pilaf and African biryani. In Malawi, it is called sumu or shum or simply "tomato and onion salad".

== See also ==
- Afghan salad, a similar salad from Afghanistan
- Arab salad, a similar salad from the Arab world
- Armenian salad, a similar salad from Armenia
- Çoban salatası, a similar salad from Turkey
- Greek salad, a similar salad from Greece
- Israeli salad, a similar salad from Israel
- Kachumber, a similar salad from India
- Pico de gallo, a similar salsa from Mexico
- Serbian salad, a similar salad from Serbia
- Shirazi salad, a similar salad from Iran
- Shopska salad, a similar salad from Bulgaria
- List of African dishes
- List of onion dishes
