= Salata baladi =

Traditional Egyptian salad

Salata baladi سلطة بلدي
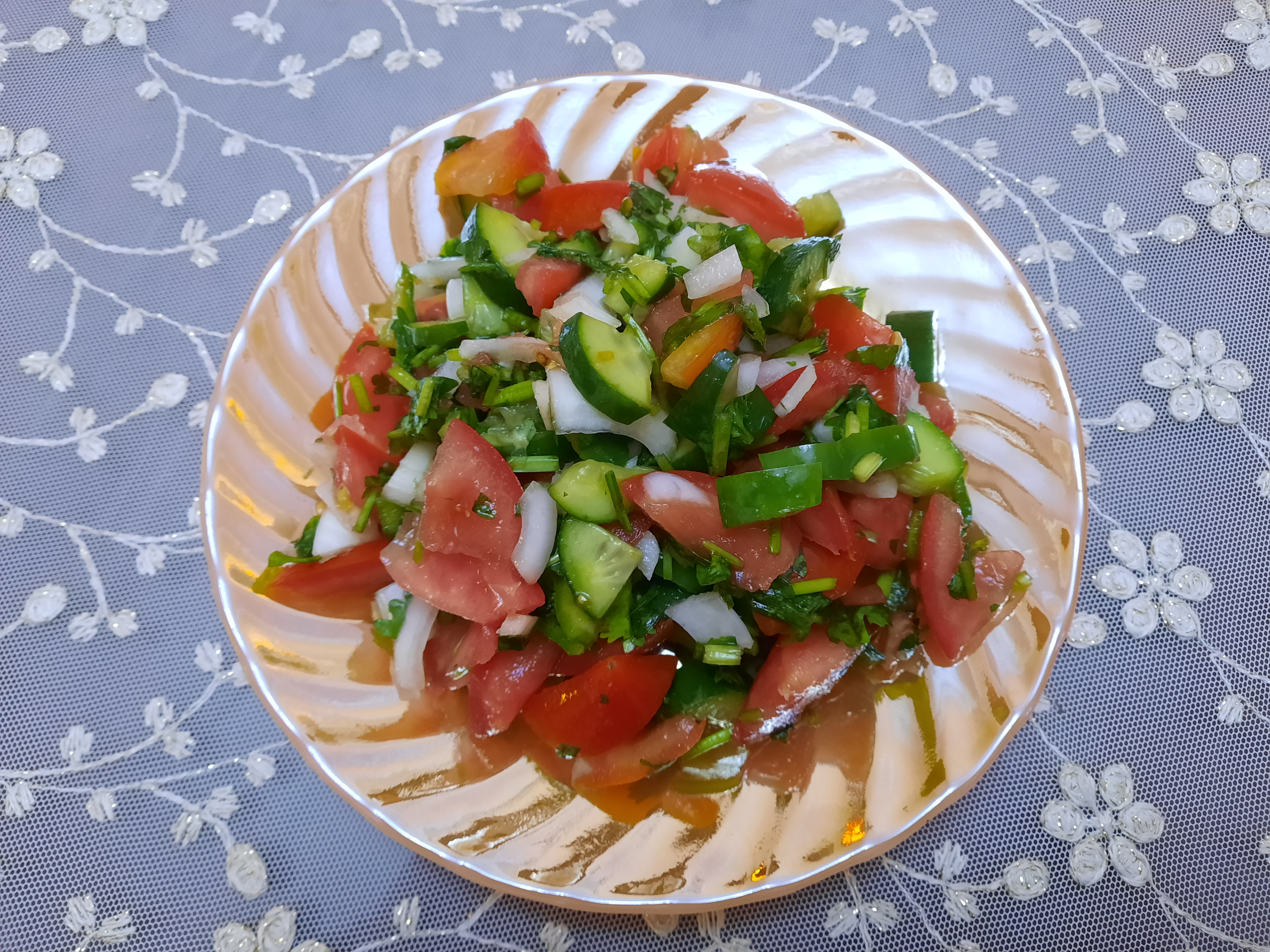
- Place of origin: Egypt
- Main ingredients: Salad: Tomatoes, cucumbers, onions and parsley Dressing: Vinegar, lime juice, olive oil
- Ingredients generally used: Mint, cumin

Salata baladi (Egyptian Arabic: سلطة بلدي) is a staple Egyptian salad, found on nearly every table spread in the country.

The term "baladi" (بلدي), from the Arabic "balad" (بلد) meaning "country" or "homeland," signifies something rooted in local culture and identity in Egypt, encompassing everything from food, dance, clothing, behavior, and language. The name reflects the salad's deep roots in Egyptian culinary culture. It is commonly served alongside various dishes, particularly grilled meats and stews.

== Preparation ==
The classic ingredients of salata baladi include tomatoes, cucumbers, yellow or red onions, and fresh parsley. These vegetables are finely diced and combined in a bowl. The dressing typically consists of lime juice, olive oil, salt, and black pepper, which are mixed and poured over the chopped vegetables. Some variations of the salad incorporate additional herbs such as mint, cumin or cilantro to enhance the flavor profile.

To prepare the salad, the cucumbers are often deseeded to reduce excess moisture, and the parsley is finely chopped, with minimal stems included. After combining all the ingredients, the salad is tossed gently to ensure even distribution of the dressing.

Salata baladi is traditionally served chilled and can be served with nearly all Egyptian dishes.

== See also ==
- Arab salad
- Egyptian cuisine
- List of Middle Eastern dishes
- List of African dishes
