= Israeli salad =

Vegetable salad made in Israel

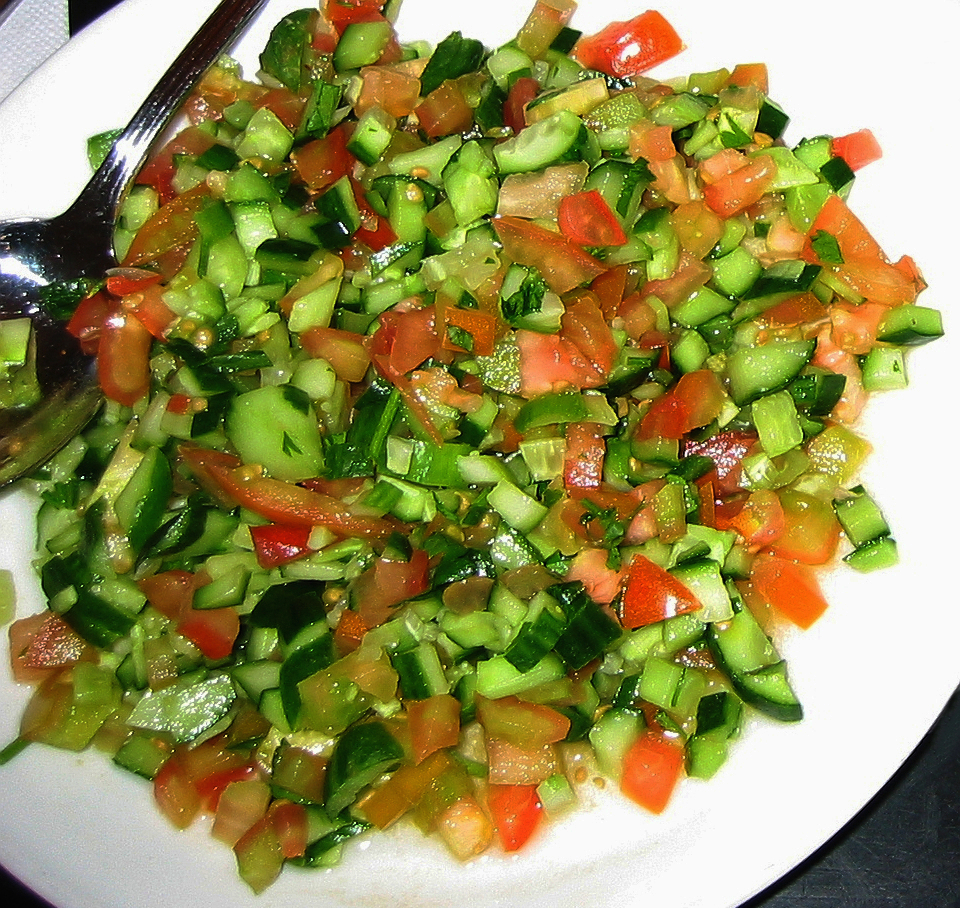
- Alternative names: salat katzutz (chopped salad), salat aravi (Arab salad), salat yerakot (vegetable salad)
- Type: Salad
- Main ingredients: Tomato, cucumber, onions, parsley, bell or chili peppers
- Variations: spring onions, radish, carrot, cabbage, mint

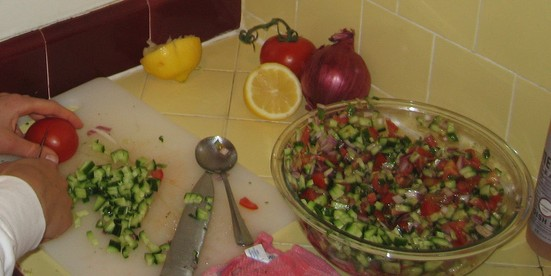
Israeli salad being prepared

Israeli salad (Hebrew: סָלָט יְרָקוֹת יִשְׂרְאֵלִי, romanized: salat yerakot yisra'eli, lit. 'Israeli vegetable salad') is a chopped salad of finely diced tomato, onion, cucumber, and bell or chili peppers. It has been described as the "most well-known national dish of Israel", and is a standard accompaniment to most Israeli meals. Salads following similar recipes, with different names, are widespread and popular throughout the Eastern Mediterranean.

It was adopted by Jewish immigrants to the Levant in the late 19th century, who found the locally grown Kirby cucumbers and tomatoes in popular local salad. It was popularized in the kibbutzim, where the Jewish farmers had local fresh produce at hand.

The name Israeli Salad is used mainly outside of Israel. Within Israel, it is commonly referred to as salat katzutz (Hebrew: סָלָט קָצוּץ, "chopped salad"), as well as salat aravi (Hebrew: סָלָט עֲרָבִי, "Arab salad"), or salat yerakot (Hebrew: סָלָט יְרָקוֹת, "vegetable salad").

== Description ==
Israeli salad is made of chopped raw tomato, onion and cucumber, and can also include pepper, carrot, scallion, leafy greens and parsley. The salad is dressed with either fresh lemon juice or olive oil, or both. Za'atar and yogurt are very common dressings at breakfast while sumac and tahini are common the rest of the day. Generally, the cucumbers are not peeled. The ability to chop the tomatoes and cucumbers into the "finest, most perfect dice" is considered a mark of status among many kibbutz cooks. Traditional recipes do not include lettuce.

In Israeli restaurants and cafes, Israeli salad is served as an independent side dish, as an accompaniment to main dishes, or stuffed in a pita with falafel or shawarma. It was a major part of the traditional Israeli breakfast at home before Western-style breakfast cereals became popular, and today it remains a standard feature at buffet breakfasts at Israeli hotels, as well as in many homes.

== History ==
Although cucumbers have an ancient history in the Middle East, tomatoes, native to South America, were not cultivated in the Syria region until possibly as late as the 19th century, during the Ottoman Empire. In the 1940, Kibbutz Beit Alfa pioneered a variety of cucumber named after the Kibbutz, which became the standard Israeli cucumber used in this salad.

Food historian Gil Marks describes how Jewish immigrants in the late 19th century first encountered the cucumber and tomato salad in then-Ottoman Palestine, and traces its presence there back to the Turkish çoban salatası (shepherd's salad). Since the cucumbers and tomatoes were familiar vegetables to both European and Middle Eastern immigrants, they were quickly incorporated into their common diet. The Kibbutz breakfast incorporated a variety of salad and fresh vegetables. Adopted and popularized by the kibbutzim across the land, this salad latter migrated to all areas of the Israeli cuisine. Variations on the basic recipe have been made by the different Jewish communities that immigrated to the country. For example, Jews from India prepare it with the addition of finely chopped ginger and green chili peppers, North African Jews may add preserved lemon peel and cayenne pepper, and Bukharan Jews chop the vegetables extremely finely and use vinegar, without oil, in the dressing.

In an interview with the BBC, Israeli culinary journalist Gil Hovav said that the Israeli salad is in fact a Palestinian Arab salad. The idea that what is known in New York delis as "Israeli salad" stems from a Palestinian rural salad is agreed on by Joseph Massad, a Palestinian professor of Arab Politics at Columbia University, as an example of the appropriation of Palestinian and Syrian foods such as hummus, falafel, and tabbouleh by Israel as "national dishes".

== Similar salads ==
Israeli Arabs or Palestinians may call their traditional cucumber and tomato salad salatat al-bandura or salatat banadura ("tomato salad"), or salata na'meh. Other similar salads found in the Middle East, include the Persian salad shirazi سالاد شيرازي (which includes mint, diced onions, and peeled cucumbers), and the Turkish çoban salatası; among others found throughout the eastern Mediterranean area in Turkey, Lebanon, and Egypt. The Indian subcontinent cuisine also includes a variant of this salad, called "kachumber".

== See also ==
- Afghan salad, a similar salad from Afghanistan
- Arab salad, a similar salad from the Arab world
- Armenian salad, a similar salad from Armenia
- Çoban salatası, a similar salad from Turkey
- Greek salad, a similar salad from Greece
- Kachumbari, a similar salad from East Africa
- Kachumber, a similar salad from India
- Pico de gallo, a similar salsa from Mexico
- Serbian salad, a similar salad from Serbia
- Shirazi salad, a similar salad from Iran
- Shopska salad, a similar salad from Bulgaria
