= List of salads =

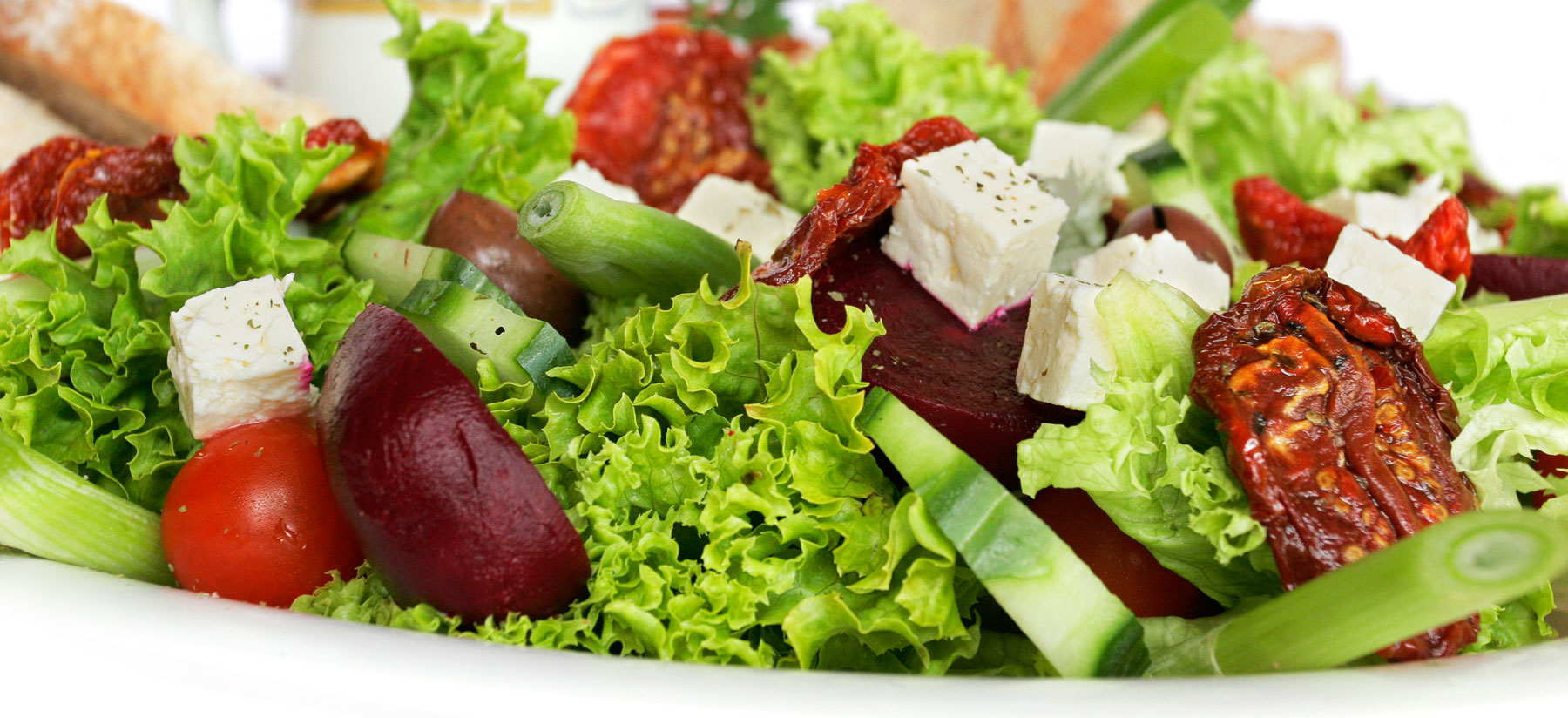
A garden salad with lettuce, sun-dried tomatoes, cherry tomatoes, beets, cucumber and feta cheese

Salad is any of a wide variety of dishes including green salads; vegetable salads; long beans; salads of pasta, legumes, or grains; mixed salads incorporating meat, poultry, or seafood; and fruit salads. They often include vegetables and fruits.

== Varieties of salad ==
Name	Image	Origin	Type	Description
Acar		Indonesia, Brunei, Malaysia, and Singapore	Vegetable salad	Made from yardlong beans, carrots and cabbage which are pickled in vinegar and dried chili peppers. The vegetables are then tossed in ground peanuts.
Afghan salad		Afghanistan	Vegetable salad	Prepared with the primary ingredients of tomato, cucumber, onion, carrot, cilantro, mint and lemon juice
African salad		Nigeria	Vegetable salad	Dried shredded cassava mixed with palm oil and spiced
Ambrosia		United States	Fruit salad	Mixed with sour cream or sweetened whipped cream, miniature marshmallows, pineapple, mandarin oranges and coconut. Variations include raspberries and strawberries.
Arab salad		Middle East	Vegetable salad	Combines many different vegetables and spices, and often served as part of a mezze
Asinan		Indonesia	Vegetable or fruit salad	A pickled (through brined or vinegared) vegetable or fruit dish, commonly found in Indonesia. The vegetable asinan is preserved vegetables served in a thin, hot, peanut sauce with vinegar, topped with peanuts and krupuk. The fruit asinan is preserved tropical fruits served in sweet, hot and sour vinegar and chili sauce, sprinkled with peanuts.
Atum com feijão-frade		Portugal	Seafood salad	Made from tuna, black-eyed peas, and finely chopped onions. It is seasoned with olive oil and white vinegar, and sparkled with minced parsley or coriander. Sliced hard-boiled eggs are often added.
Banana salad		South Africa	Fruit salad	Composed of condensed milk, mayonnaise and mild curry powder.
Bean salad		Worldwide	Bean salad	Mainly composed of cooked pole beans (green beans or yellow wax beans), cooked chickpeas (garbanzo beans), cooked kidney beans and sliced or diced fresh beetroot. The beans are marinated in an oil/vinegar vinaigrette, sometimes sweetened with sugar.
Beet salad		Quebec, Canada	Vegetable salad	Primarily made of beets. May include arugula. One well-known recipe dating back to the 18th century includes beets, capers, and olive oil.
Bok l'hong bok lahong		Cambodia	Fruit salad	A papaya salad. Herbs added to the salad either as ingredients or garnishes might include kantrop, lime leaves and basil. The dressing may include fish sauce, shrimp paste, dried shrimp, preserved crabs, crushed peanuts or lime juice. Other vegetables used may include diced tomatoes and shredded carrots.
Caesar salad		Mexico	Green salad	Romaine lettuce and croutons dressed with parmesan cheese, lemon juice, olive oil, egg, Worcestershire sauce, anchovies, and black pepper
Cappon magro		Genoa, Italy	Seafood salad	Seafood and vegetables over hard tack arranged into a decorative pyramid and dressed with a rich sauce
Celery Victor		United States	Vegetable salad	Celery hearts simmered in a veal or chicken stock, chilled (often in a citrus or vinegar marinade), tossed with mild peppers, then served with Romaine lettuce. Invented in 1910 by Victor Hertzler who is also credited by some for inventing crab Louis.
Ceviche		South America	Fish salad	A South American seafood dish that originated in Peru, typically made from fresh raw fish cured in fresh citrus juices, most commonly lemon or lime, but historically made with the juice of bitter orange. It is also spiced with ají, chili peppers or other seasonings and chopped onions, salt, and coriander are also added
Cheese slaw		Australia	Cheese salad	A salad consisting of grated cheese, grated carrot and a mayonnaise dressing.
Chef salad		United States	Vegetable and meat salad	Usually made with hard-boiled eggs, strips of ham or another cold cut (such as roast beef, turkey, or chicken), croutons, tomatoes, cucumbers, and cheese (often crumbled), all placed upon a bed of tossed lettuce or other leaf vegetables. Several early recipes also include anchovies. It may be served with a variety of dressings.
Chicken salad		Worldwide	Meat salad	Any salad that contains chicken as a main ingredient. Other common ingredients include boiled eggs, mayonnaise, and a variety of mustards.
Chilean salad		Chile	Vegetable salad	Contains tomato, onion, coriander and olive oil, and sometimes with chili peppers
Chinese chicken salad		United States	Meat salad	A salad with chicken flavored by Chinese seasonings, popular in the United States.
Çoban salatası		Turkey	Vegetable salad	A combination of finely chopped tomatoes, cucumbers, onions, green peppers and flat-leaf parsley. The dressing consists of a simple mix of lemon juice, extra virgin olive oil and salt.
Cobb salad		United States	Vegetable salad	The original recipe contained: lettuce (head lettuce, watercress, chicory, and romaine), tomatoes, crisp bacon, chicken breast, hard-cooked eggs, avocado, Roquefort cheese, chives and vinaigrette.
Coleslaw		Netherlands	Cabbage	Coleslaw, sometimes is a type of salad consisting primarily of shredded raw cabbage. It may also include shredded carrots.
Cookie salad		Minnesota, United States	Dessert salad	A salad from the U.S. state of Minnesota made with buttermilk or sour cream, vanilla pudding, whipped cream, mandarin oranges, and fudge stripe shortbread cookies. It is popular with children and for potlucks. Berries can also be added. The salad is also prepared in other areas of the Midwestern United States.
Crab Louie		United States	Seafood salad	The "King of Salads." A typical Crab Louie salad consists of crab meat, hard boiled eggs, tomato, asparagus, cucumber and is served on a bed of Romaine lettuce with a Louie dressing based on mayonnaise, chili sauce and peppers on the side. Some recipes include olives and scallions.
Curtido		Central America	Cabbage	A lightly fermented cabbage relish.
Dressed herring		Russia	Herring and vegetable salad	Diced, salted herring covered with layers of grated, boiled vegetables (potatoes, carrots, beet roots), chopped onions, and mayonnaise.
Đurđevac salad		Croatia	Vegetable salad	Đurđevac salad consists of beans, onions, cabbage, pumpkin seed oil, and vinegar.
Egg salad		Worldwide	Egg salad	Egg salad is often used as a sandwich spread, typically made of chopped hard-boiled eggs, mayonnaise, mustard, minced celery or onion, salt, pepper and paprika.
Fattoush		Levant	Bread salad	A bread salad made from toasted or fried pieces of pita bread (khubz 'Arabi) combined with mixed greens and other vegetables.
Fiambre		Guatemala	Meat salad	A traditional Guatemalan salad eaten on November 1 and 2, to celebrate the Day of the Dead (Día de los Difuntos) and the All Saints Day (Día de los Santos). It is a salad, served chilled, and may be made up from over 50 ingredients.
Fruit salad		Worldwide	Fruit salad	Made with various types of fruit, served either in their own juices or a syrup. Also known as a fruit cocktail.
Gado-gado		Indonesia	Vegetable salad	A traditional dish in Indonesian cuisine, and is a vegetable salad served with a peanut sauce dressing, eaten as a main dish.
Garden salad		Worldwide	Green salad	Made with lettuce such as iceberg, romaine or mesclun greens. Other toppings may include: tomatoes, carrots, onions, cucumbers, mushrooms, bell peppers.
Glasswort salad		Turkey	Green salad	Prepared with glasswort, lemon juice, olive oil and garlic
Glorified rice		United States	Fruit salad	Made from rice, crushed pineapple, egg, sugar, vinegar, flour and whipped cream. It may be decorated with maraschino cherries.
Golbaengi muchim		Korea	Fish salad	Made with Neverita didyma, (a sea snail), dried shredded squid or dried Alaska pollack, vegetables such as sliced cucumber, and shredded scallions, and mixed with a hot and spicy sauce. The sauce is generally made with gochujang (chili pepper paste), chili pepper powder, vinegar, sugar, salt, minced garlic, and sesame oil.
Greek salad		Greece	Vegetable salad	Made with wedges of tomatoes, cucumber, green bell peppers, red onion, sliced or cubed feta cheese, and kalamata olives, typically seasoned with salt, black pepper and dried oregano, and dressed with olive oil and red wine vinegar.
Green papaya salad		Laos	Fruit salad	A spicy salad made from shredded green papaya, halved cherry tomatoes, dried shrimps, Chinese long beans or green beans, sliced green onions, sliced birds eye chillies and chopped peanuts. Seasoned with lime juice, palm sugar, fish sauce, chopped coriander (cilantro) and minced garlic. Thai papaya salad is referred to as som tam while Laos papaya salad is referred to as dtam mak huhng
Ham salad			Meat salad	Includes ham, mayonnaise or salad dressing, diced dill or sweet pickles or pickle relish, chopped hard boiled egg, and perhaps onions, celery, cucumber or tomatoes.
Herring salad		Sweden	Fish salad	Made of cut and salted herring with beetroot, onion and potato.
Insalata Caprese		Campania, Italy	Tomato and cheese salad	Made of sliced fresh buffalo mozzarella, tomatoes and basil, and seasoned with salt, pepper, and olive oil.
Israeli salad		Middle East	Vegetable salad	Chopped salad of finely diced tomato and cucumber. Usually made of tomatoes, cucumbers, onions and parsley, and dressed with fresh lemon juice, olive oil and black pepper. Generally, the cucumbers are not peeled. The key is using very fresh vegetables and chopping them as finely as possible.
Jello salad		United States	Fruit salad	Made with flavored gelatin, fruit and sometimes grated carrots or, more rarely, other vegetables. Other ingredients may include cottage cheese, cream cheese, marshmallows, nuts or pretzels.
Kachumbari		Africa	Vegetable salad	Uncooked salad dish consisting of chopped tomatoes, onions, and chili peppers.
Kachumber		India	Vegetable salad	A raw vegetable salad consisting of fresh chopped tomatoes, cucumbers, onions, lemon juice, and sometimes, chili peppers.
Kani salad		Japan	Fish salad	Made with imitation crab meat, vegetables, and a mayonnaise-based dressing.
Karedok		West Java, Indonesia	Vegetable salad	A raw vegetable salad made from cucumbers, bean sprouts, cabbage, legumes, Thai basil, and small green eggplant.
Khao yam		Thailand	Rice salad	A rice salad made with fruit (in this case pomelo), herbs, vegetables, roasted coconut, and dried prawns.
Kinilnat		Philippines	Vegetable salad	The leaves, shoots, blossoms, or the other parts of sweet potato, bitter melon or other edible plants are boiled and drained and dressed with bagoong (preferably) or patis, and sometimes souring agents like calamansi or cherry tomatoes are added, as well as freshly ground ginger.
Kısır		Turkey	Grain salad	A side dish made from fine bulgur, parsley, and tomato paste.
Kosambari		India	Vegetable salad	A side dish made from soaked split green gram dal, minced cucumber, grated carrot, radish, lemon, cilantro.
Lalab		Java, Indonesia	Mostly raw vegetable salad	Assorted raw vegetables; tomato, cucumber, lettuces, lemon basil, etc. (except chayote are boiled, and petai stinky green bean are fried). Served with sambal terasi (chili with shrimp paste).
Larb		Laos	Meat salad	A spicy meat salad usually made with chicken, beef, duck, turkey, pork or sometimes fish, flavored with fish sauce, lime juice and herbs.
Lyutika		Bulgaria	Vegetable salad	Made from roasted peppers, tomatoes, garlic, onions, and vegetable oil, usually crushed with a pestle in a mortar.
Macaroni salad		Worldwide	Pasta salad	Made with cooked elbow macaroni pasta served cold and usually prepared with mayonnaise.
Macedonia salad		France	Fruit salad	Composed of small pieces of fruit or vegetables. The former is eaten as a dessert, the latter as a cold salad.
Mallung		Sri Lanka	Vegetable salad	Chopped greens or vegetables, mixed with grated coconut, cooked with spices and chillies
Matbucha		Morocco	Vegetable salad	Mainly made with tomatoes, roasted peppers, oil and garlic which are cooked together.
Mesclun		Provence, France	Vegetable salad	A salad mix that traditionally mix includes chervil, arugula, leafy lettuces and endive in equal proportions, but modern iterations may include an undetermined mix of fresh and available lettuces and greens.
Michigan salad		United States	Vegetable salad	Green salad usually topped with dried cherries, blue cheese, and a vinaigrette salad dressing.
Mimosa salad		Russia	Fish, egg and cheese salad	Canned fish, hard boiled eggs, cheese, onion, with mayonnaise.
Mišanca		Dalmatia, Croatia	Wild herbs	Mišanca is a mixture of wild herbs. It can be consumed shortly boiled in salted water, mixed with spinach or swiss chard in order to improve mišanca's bitter flavors, or as a side dish accompanying numerous fish and meat dishes.
Mushroom salad		Finland	Mushroom salad	Fresh or salted mushrooms, onion, crème fraîche or smetana.
Nam khao		Laos	Meat salad	Crumbled, deep-fried balls of sticky rice and naem (fermented sausage of pork skin mixed with sticky rice) are mixed with sliced shallots, dried chillies, fish sauce and lime juice. It is served with raw vegetables and fresh herbs.
Niçoise salad		Côte d'Azur, France	Vegetable salad	A salad that originated in and named for the city of Nice and consists of tomatoes, native Nicoise olives, young raw fava beans, young raw artichokes, hard-boiled eggs, radish, green onions, green peppers and garnished with tinned anchovies. It is served with black pepper and olive oil.
Olivier salad Russian salad		Russia	Potato and meat salad	Diced potato, hard boiled eggs, green peas, pickles, meat (sometimes fish or seafood), with mayonnaise.
Panzanella		Florence, Italy	Bread salad	A bread salad that includes sliced bread and fresh tomatoes flavored with basil, olive oil, and vinegar, often with salt and Black pepper.
Pao cai		Sichuan, China	Vegetable salad	A pickled cabbage salad.
Pasembur		Malaysia	Fish salad	Shredded cucumber, turnip, potato, beancurd, bean sprouts, prawn fritters, spicy fried crab, fried octopus, etc. served with a sweet and spicy nut sauce.
Pasta salad		Worldwide	Pasta salad	Prepared with one or more types of pasta, usually chilled, and most often tossed in a vinegar, oil or mayonnaise-based dressing.
Pecel		Java, Indonesia	Vegetable salad	Mixed vegetables in a peanut sauce dressing.
Perigourdine		Périgord, France	Vegetable salad	Lettuce with croutons, duck gesiers (gizzards), walnut and a vinaigrette dressing made with walnut oil.
Phla mu		Thailand	Meat salad	A spicy Thai salad of grilled pork, lemongrass, mint, culantro and shallots, with a dressing of lime juice, sweet chilli paste (nam phrik phao), fish sauce, pounded garlic and bird's eye chili.
Pittsburgh salad		Pennsylvania, United States	Vegetable salad	Salad with French fries.
Piyaz		Turkey	Bean salad	Made from any kind of dry beans with hard-boiled egg and dry onions. (Sometimes lettuce is also added for freshness.)
Potato salad		Worldwide	Potato salad	Made from potatoes, and varies throughout different regions of the world. American versions often use mayonnaise, sour cream or milk dressing.
Raheb		Lebanon	Vegetable salad	Made with eggplant (aubergine) and tomatoes.
Ramen salad	Ramen salad 20151103	Hokkaido, Japan	Noodle salad	Made with lettuce, tomato, sweetcorn, cucumber, and egg. It is dressed with sesame dressing and Japanese mayonnaise. It is often served in Izakayas in the region as a light snack.
Rojak		Malaysia, Singapore and Indonesia	Fruit salad	A fruit and vegetable salad dish
Rosolli		Finland	Vegetable salad	A salad typically made with potato, carrot, and beetroot. Sometimes it also includes pickled cucumber, onion or apple. The salad is a traditional part of the Finnish Christmas meal.
Seven-layer salad		United States	Vegetable salad	Usually includes Iceberg lettuce, tomato, cucumber, onion, sweet peas, hard boiled eggs, sharp cheddar cheese, and bacon pieces.
Sabich salad		Israel	Egg salad	A salad variation of Sabich dish, made from eggplant, boiled eggs/hard boiled eggs, tahini, Israeli salad, potato, parsley and amba. sumac and za'atar can also be added to the dish.
Salat avocado		Israel	Avocado salad	Made with avocados, with lemon juice and chopped scallions (spring onions)
Salat kharif		Israel	Vegetable salad	Made finely chopped tomatoes, thinly chopped green hot chili peppers, chopped garlic, olive oil and salt.
Serbian salad		Serbia	Vegetable salad	Usually served during summer with roast meat and other dishes. It is made from diced fresh tomatoes, cucumber and onions, usually seasoned with sunflower or olive oil, salt and commonly with a variety of hot pepper similar to cayenne pepper and called feferon.
Shepherd's salad		Bulgaria	Vegetable and meat salad	Includes tomatoes, cucumbers, onion, roasted red peppers, parsley, sirene (white brine cheese), eggs, kashkaval (yellow cheese), mushrooms and ham
Shopska salad		Bulgaria	Vegetable salad	Made with tomatoes, cucumbers, onion, raw green or roasted red peppers, parsley, and sirene (white brine cheese).
Snow White Salad		Bulgaria	Vegetable and milk salad	Made of strained yogurt, cucumber, garlic, salt, usually cooking oil, dill, sometimes roasted peppers, walnuts and parsley
Shirazi salad		Iran	Vegetable salad	A very common and popular salad in Iran prepared with finely chopped tomatoes, cucumbers, onions, verjuice and mint.
Singju		Manipur, India	Vegetable, herbal and fish salad	A salad made from Ngari (fermented fish), chilies, food powders, vegetables and herbs.
Skagenröra		Sweden	Seafood salad	Shrimp salad made with mayonnaise, crème fraîche, dill and onion, and garnished with roe.
Slavonian hen salad		Slavonia, Croatia	Meat salad	Made with a combination of hen meat, celery, carrots, potatoes, cauliflower, peas, parsley, mayonnaise, salt, and pepper.
Snickers salad		Iowa, United States	Dessert salad	A mix of Snickers bars, Granny Smith apples, and whipped cream or whipped topping (such as Cool Whip) served in a bowl.
Szałot		Poland	Potato salad	Made from boiled potatoes, carrots, peas, ham, various sausages, pickled fish, boiled eggs, and dressed with olive oil or mayonnaise.
Šokačka salad		Slavonia, Croatia	Meat salad	It's made with a combination of homecooked ham, cooked and chilled chicken breast, tomatoes, peppers, spring onions, pickles, pumpkin seeds, sunflower seeds, and boiled quail eggs.
Tabbouleh		Levant	Herb salad	Finely chopped parsley, bulgur, mint, tomato, scallion, and other herbs with lemon juice, olive oil and various seasonings, generally including black pepper and sometimes cinnamon and allspice.
Taco salad		United States	Meat salad	A fried tortilla shell stuffed with shredded iceberg lettuce and topped with tomato, Cheddar cheese, sour cream, guacamole or taco sauce, then topped with taco meat (ground beef) or seasoned shredded chicken. The salad may also include a base of refried beans on the shell before the lettuce is added.
Gỏi nhệch		Vietnam	Rice paddy eel salad	A Vietnamese salad made from small fry and usual condiments of Gỏi.
Tam mu yo		Thailand	Meat salad	A spicy Thai salad made with mu yo, a Thai pork sausage which is often also described in Thailand as "Vietnamese sausage". The dressing is somewhat similar to that of som tam.
Tam phonlamai ruam		Thailand	Fruit salad	The fruits used in this particular salad show the fusion aspect of Thai cuisine, as it incorporates "modern" (for Thais) fruit such as apples and grapes besides traditional fruit such as pineapple and guava. The dressing is made with pounded garlic, sugar, chillies, dried shrimp, lime juice and fish sauce, and is similar to that of som tam.
Taramosalata		Greece and Turkey	Fish roe	A Greek and Turkish meze. It is traditionally made from taramas, the salted and cured roe of the carp or cod. The roe is mixed with either bread crumbs or mashed potato, and lemon juice, vinegar and olive oil.
Tuna salad			Fish salad	Usually a blend of canned tuna, and some form of mayonnaise and/or mustard.
Urap		Java, Indonesia	Vegetable salad	Salad dish of steamed vegetables mixed with seasoned and spiced grated coconut for dressing
Urnebes		Serbia	Cheese salad	Made of pavlaka, a dairy product that is produced by souring heavy cream and hot chili peppers, with salt and other spices.
Vinegret		Russia	Vegetable salad	Diced boiled vegetables (beet roots, potatoes, carrots), chopped onions, and sauerkraut or pickled cucumbers. Other ingredients, such as green peas or beans, are sometimes also added. Dressed with vinaigrette or simply with sunflower or other vegetable oil.
Waldorf salad		New York, United States	Fruit salad	The salad was created by the Waldorf Hotel in New York City. It comprises julienned apples and celery, chopped walnuts, grapes, and mayonnaise.
Watergate salad		Midwestern United States	Dessert salad	Also known variously as Pistachio salad, Hawaiian Surprise, Pistachio Delight, and Picnic Passion. It is made from pistachio pudding, canned fruit, and whipped topping.
Wedge salad		United States	Vegetable salad	Made from cutting a solid non-shredded head of lettuce into a wedge shape, topped with blue cheese dressing and pieces of cooked bacon.
Wurstsalat		Germany, France, Switzerland and Austria	Meat salad	A tart sausage salad prepared with vinegar, oil and onions.
Yam khai dao		Thailand	Egg salad	A spicy Thai salad made with fried egg (khai dao).
Yam khamin khao kung		Thailand	Spice salad	A spicy Thai salad made with finely sliced "white curcuma" (Curcuma zedoaria), shredded coconut, cooked prawns, sliced shallots, dried chillies, fresh green bird's eye chilies, roasted cashew nuts, and crispy fried onion rings.
Yam kun chiang		Thailand	Meat salad	A Thai salad made with a dried pork sausage of Chinese origin called kun chiang. This dish is often eaten with plain rice congee.
Yam naem		Thailand	Meat salad	A Thai salad containing sausage made from fermented raw pork and sticky rice (naem).
Yam pla duk fu		Thailand	Fish salad	Crispy fried shredded catfish served with a spicy and tangy green mango salad.
Yam thua phu		Thailand	Vegetable salad	A Thai salad with winged beans, salted eggs, toasted coconut, shallots, fish sauce, lime juice and chillies. Other ingredients, such as squid, can be added to the basic recipe.
Yusheng		Guangdong, China, Malaysia and Singapore	Fish salad	A Lunar New Year salad with sliced raw fish. Pictured: South East Asian version with juliened carrots, radishes, peppers, pickled ginger, peanuts, pomelo, crackers, spices, and sauces. The customary tossing of ingredients during gatherings symbolizes rising prosperity.

=== Unsorted ===
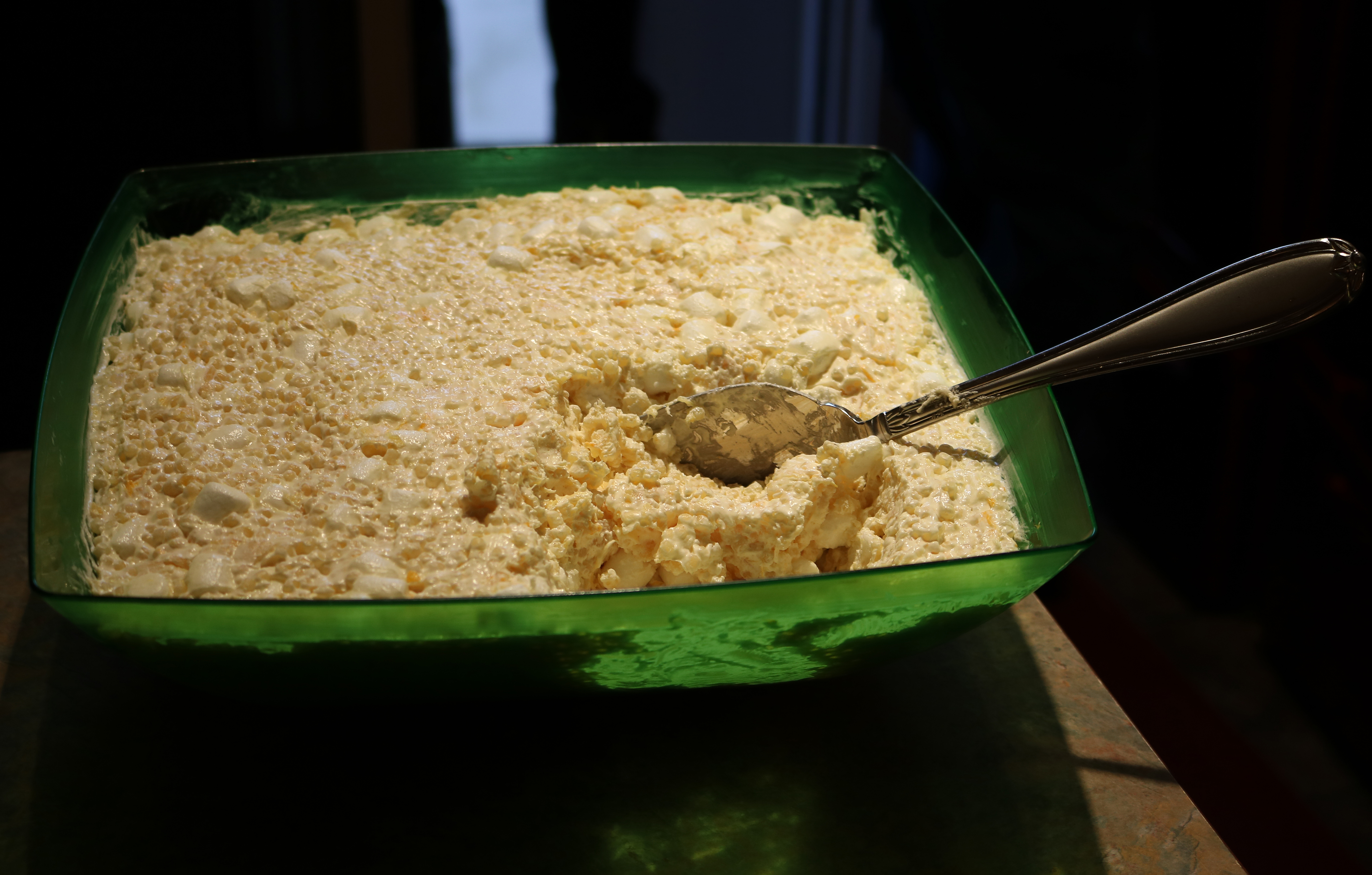
Frogeye salad

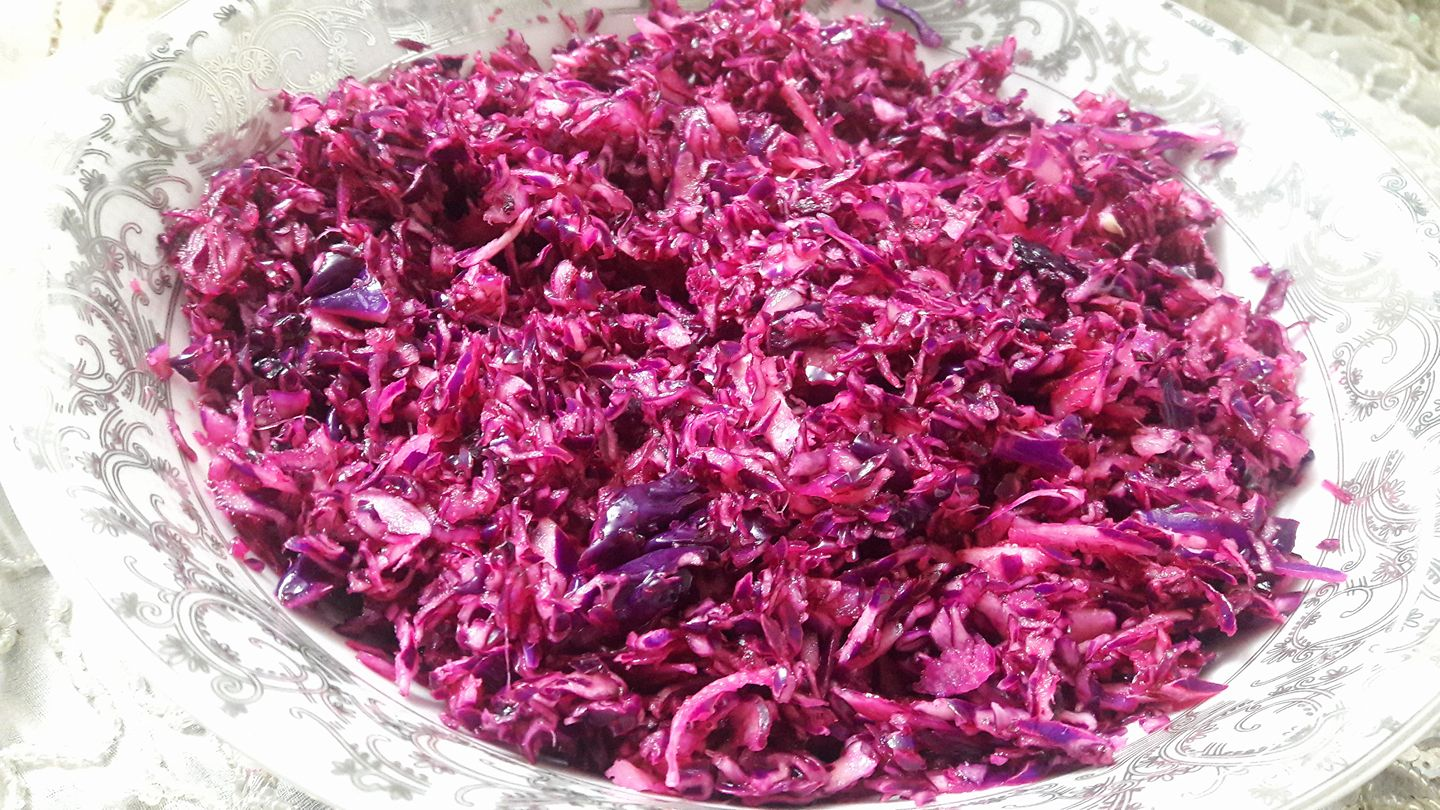
Malfouf salad

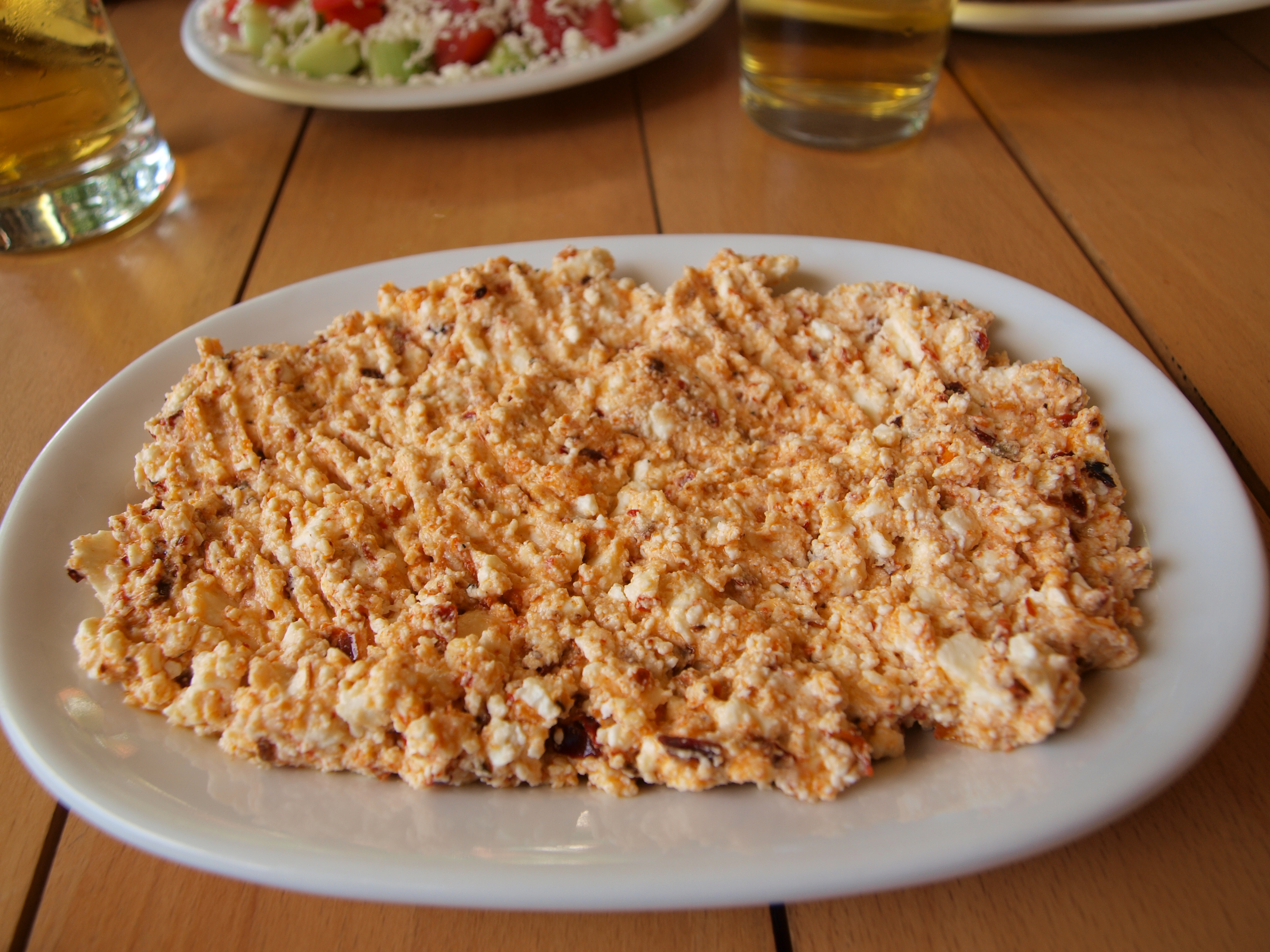
Urnebes

- Baba ghanoush
- Bionico
- Blunkett salad
- Buljol
- Candle salad
- Carrot salad
- Dessert salad
- Esgarrat
- Esqueixada
- Frogeye salad
- Frozen salad
- Goma-ae
- Hummus salad
- Kısır
- Koi
- Kuluban
- Kung chae nampla
- Malfouf salad
- Masmouta salad
- Matbukha
- Mechouia salad
- Mizeria
- Nam khao
- Nam tok
- Nan gyi thohk
- Nộm
- Nopalito
- Olive salad
- Pantesca salad
- Papaya salad
- Rubiyan salad
- Sabzi khordan
- Salade cauchoise
- Salată de boeuf
- Salmagundi
- Seafoam salad
- Shalgam
- Shʿifurah
- Sicilian orange salad
- Snow white salad
- Sōmen salad
- Spinach salad
- Strawberry Delight – a dessert salad
- Sweet potato salad
- Taktouka
- Ulam
- Urnebes
- Ummak huriyya
- Wheat salad
- Yum sen lon

== Salad dressings ==
Making vinaigrette – pouring oil into vinegar and mustard prior to whipping into emulsion

The following are examples of common salad dressings:

- Blue cheese dressing
- Caesar dressing
- Extra virgin olive oil
- French dressing
- Green goddess dressing
- Honey Dijon
- Italian dressing
- Louis dressing
- Ranch dressing
- Rice vinegar
- Russian dressing
- Salad cream
- Tahini
- Thousand Island dressing
- Vinaigrette
- Sesame dressing
- Wafu dressing

== See also ==
- Anju
- Cuisine
- Eggplant salads and appetizers
- Hors d'oeuvre
- List of Arab salads
- List of vegetable dishes
- Meze
- Salad bar
- Thai salads
- Zakuski
