= Nộm =

Type of salad in Vietnamese cuisine

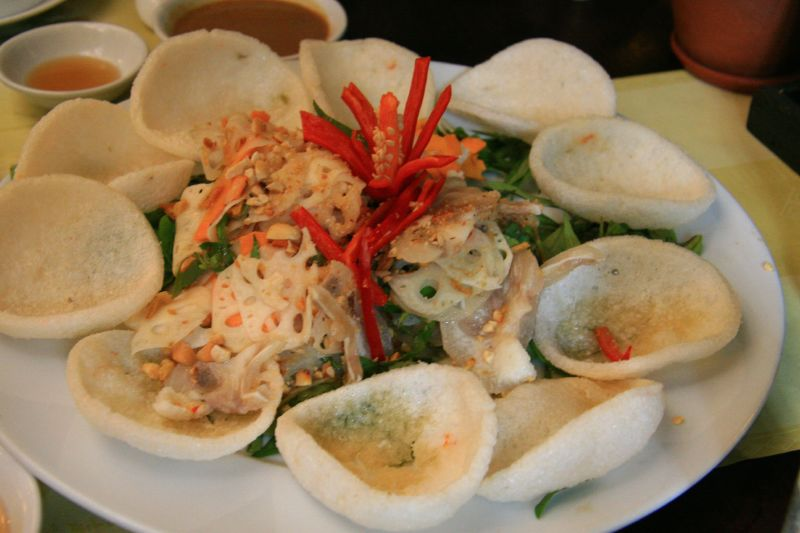
Gỏi tai heo (pig ear salad), made with lotus and shrimp puffs, phồng tôm.

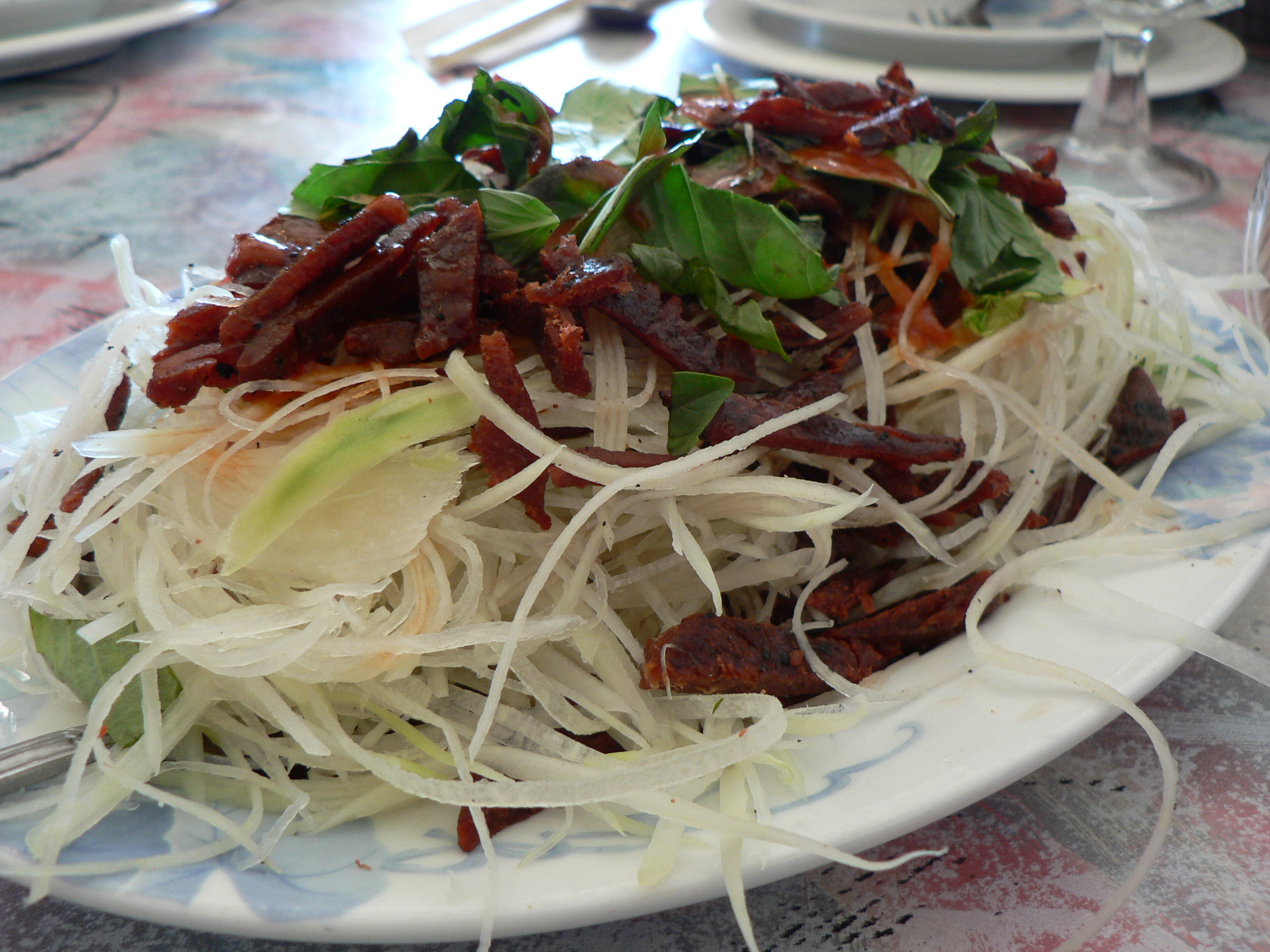
Gỏi đu đủ khô bò

Nộm or Gỏi (in Southern Vietnam) is the indigenous salad of Vietnamese cuisine. It is to be distinguished from sa lát (from the French for salad), and sa lát Nga ("Russian salad") found in Western style restaurants.

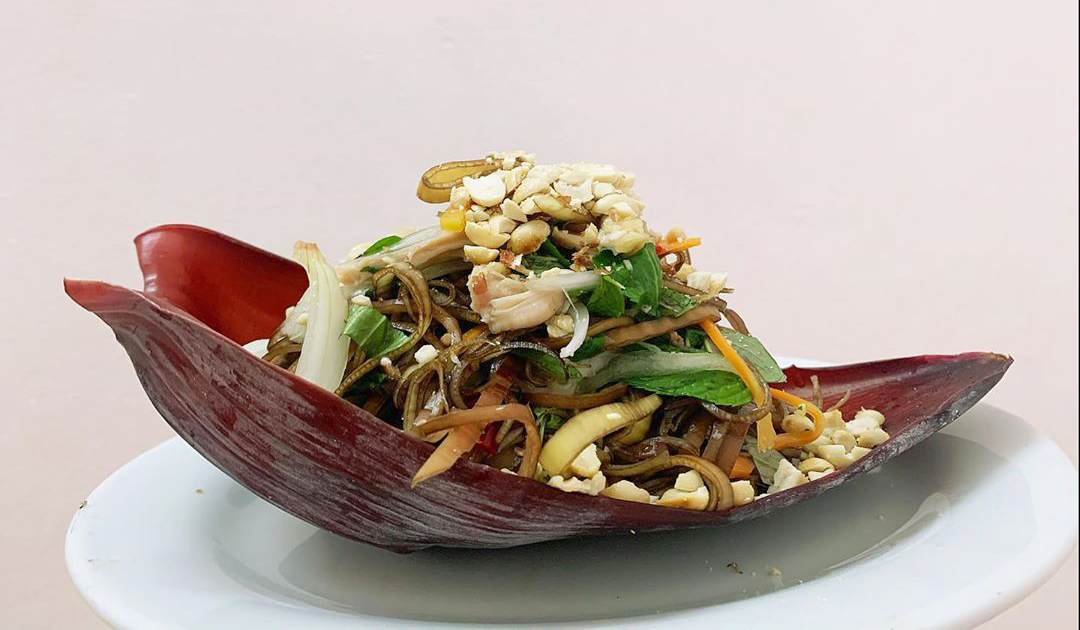
Nộm hoa chuối

This salad is a combination of a variety of fresh vegetables, grated turnip, kohlrabi, cabbage, or papaya, and slices of cucumber often with meat - either grated, boiled, lean pork, beef, shrimp or small fry. Other ingredients and condiments include spice, herbs, and peanut. The salad is mixed, soaked in vinegar, sugar, garlic, chili pepper, and seasoned with salt.

One of the best known is gỏi gà, chicken salad. Other varieties include bánh đúc nộm salad made with bánh đúc, gỏi bò khô dried beef salad with Vietnamese balm, the popular gỏi đu đủ xanh green papaya salad and gỏi tôm prawn salad and local specialities such as rice-paddy eel salad, gỏi nhệch.

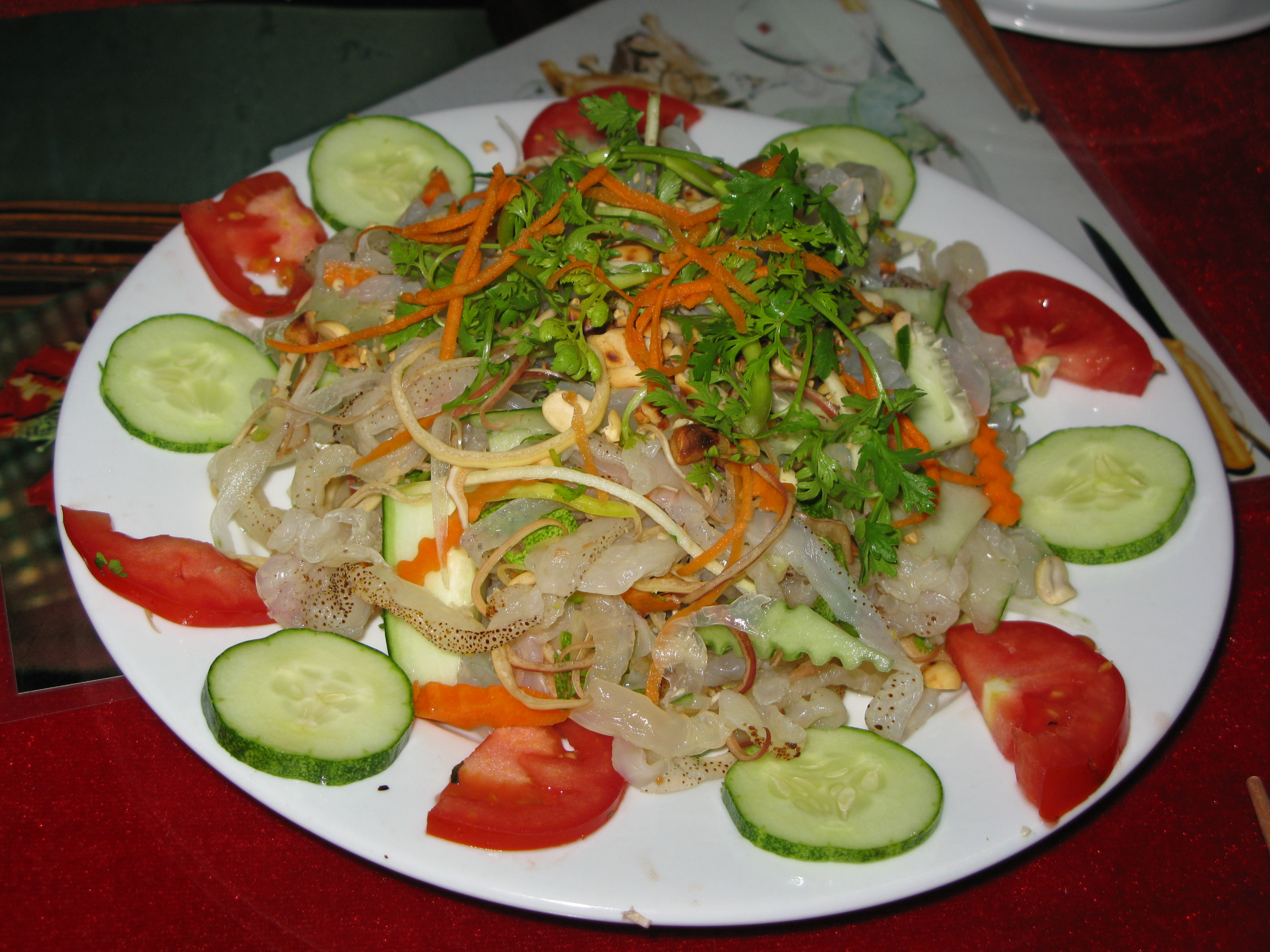
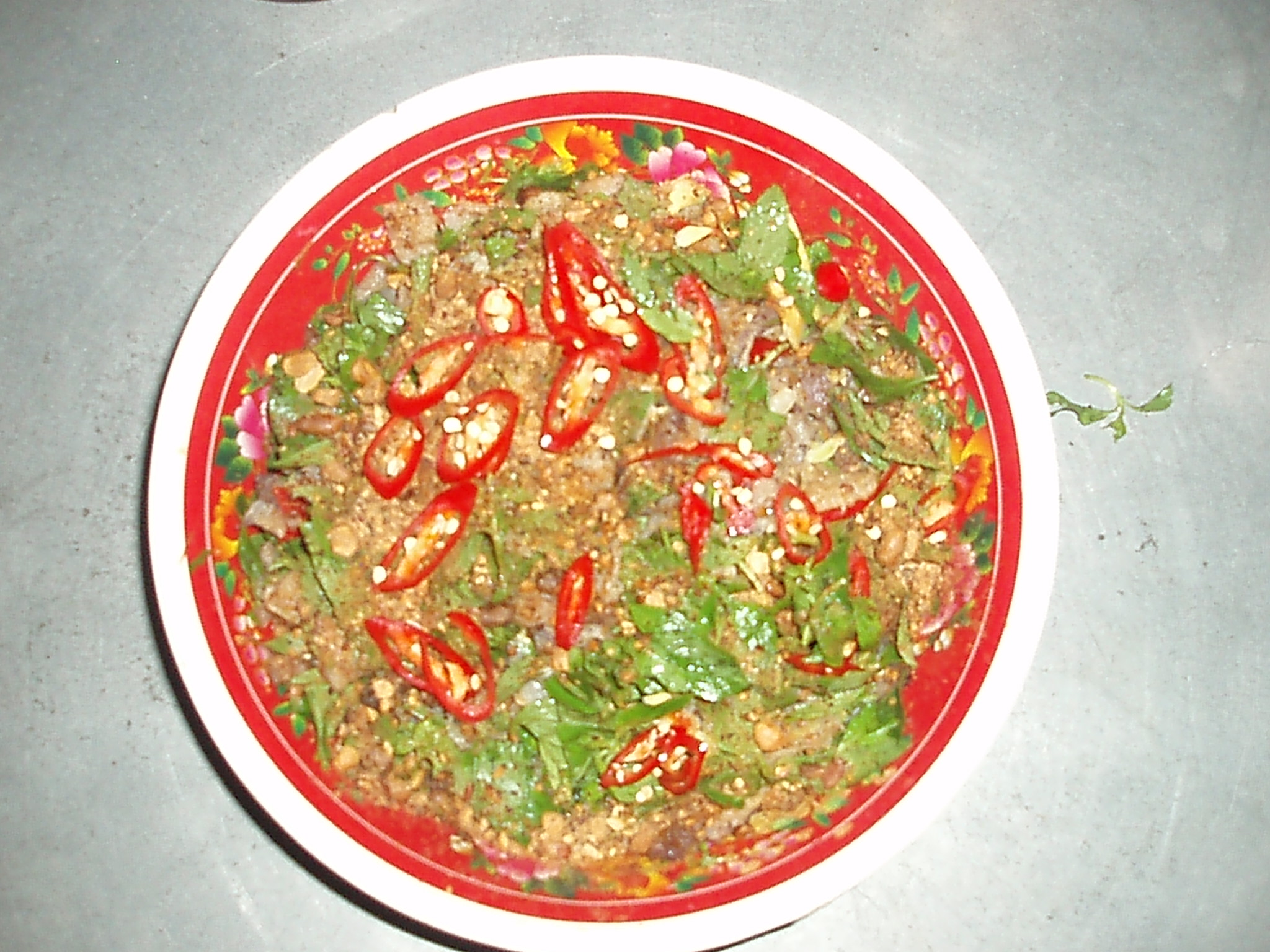
Nộm sứa

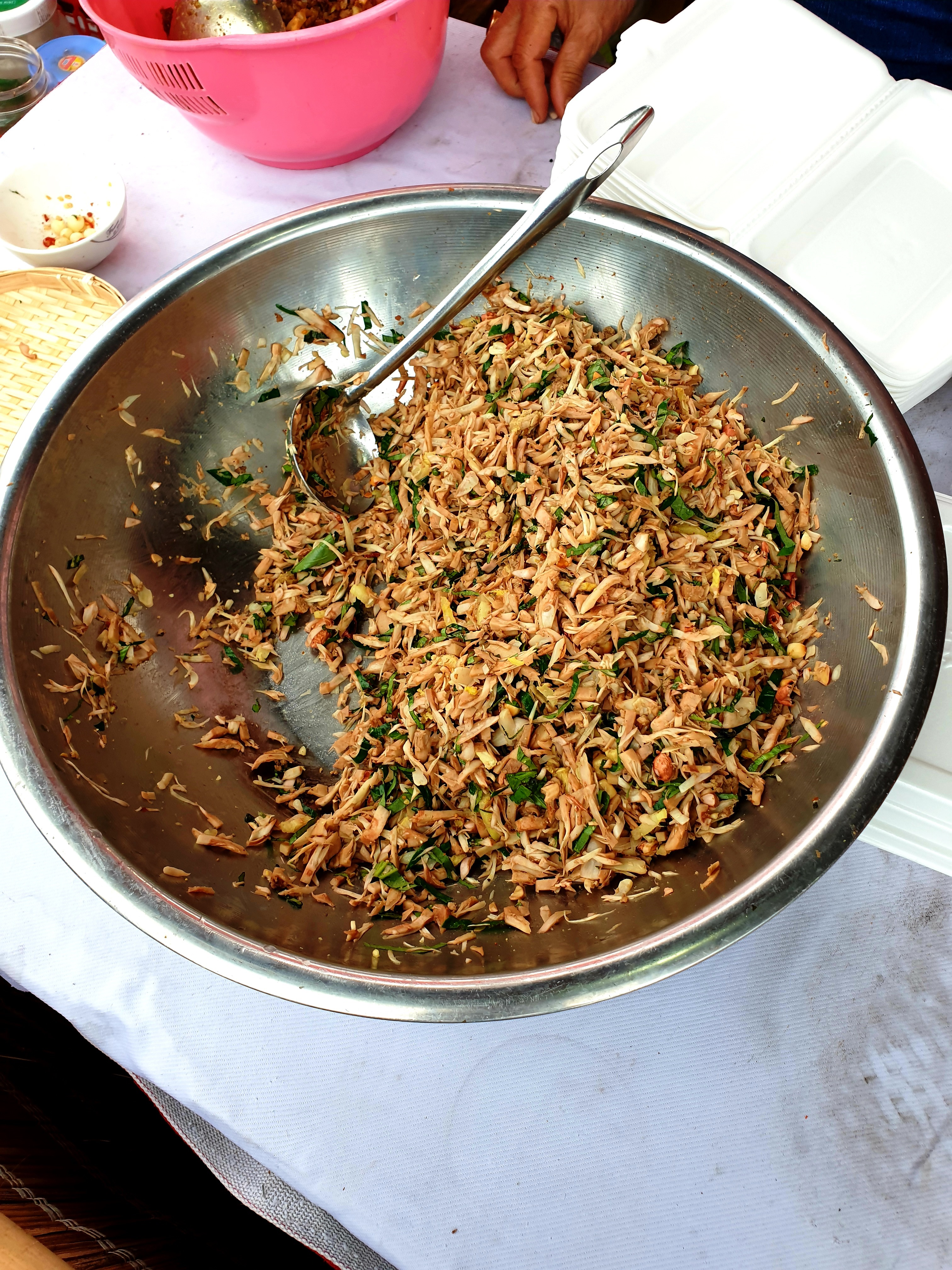
Gỏi thấu

== See also ==
- List of salads
