= Potato salad =

Salad made from boiled potatoes

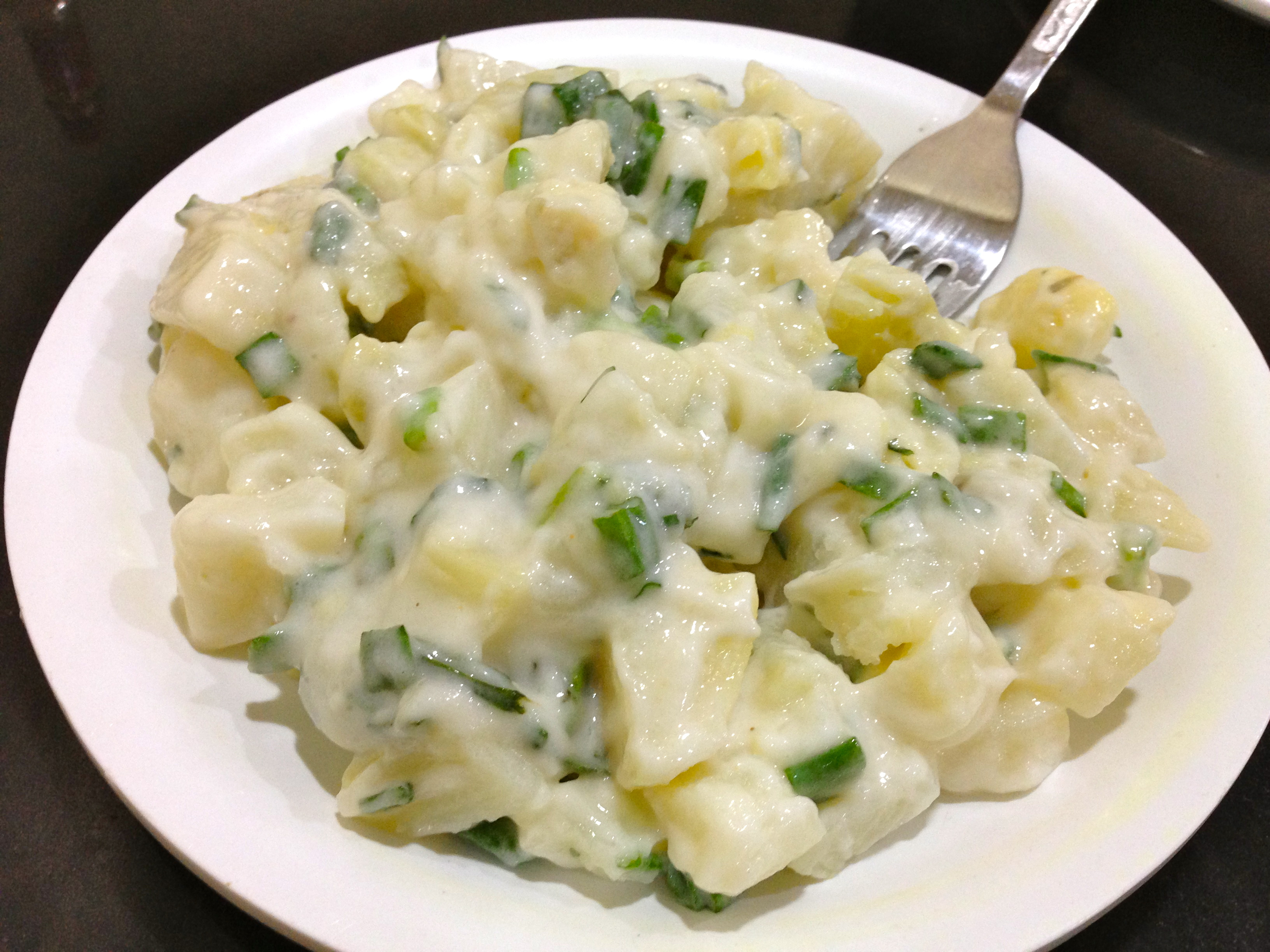
- Restaurant cold potato salad
- Type: Salad
- Course: Side dish
- Place of origin: Europe
- Region or state: Central Europe/Eastern Europe
- Created by: There is no specific historical figure who is considered the creator of potato salad. Like many traditional dishes, potato salad seems to have evolved organically in various regions, particularly in Germany, after the potato was introduced to Europe in the 16th century.
- Serving temperature: Cold (some warm)
- Main ingredients: Potatoes
- Ingredients generally used: Eggs, mayonnaise, dill
- Food energy (per serving): 250–400 kcal
- Other information: After the potato was introduced to Europe in the 16th century, local populations began experimenting with the potato, combining it with available ingredients, such as vinegar, mustard, and onion, thus creating the first forms of potato salad.

Potato salad is a salad dish made from boiled potatoes, usually containing a dressing and a variety of other ingredients such as boiled eggs and raw vegetables. It is usually served as a side dish.

== History and varieties ==
Potato salad is found in several countries in Europe. The oldest known recipe comes from the work Nova Typis Navigatio of 1621 by the Austrian abbot of the Seitenstetten Abbey, Caspar Plautz. The potato salad spread largely throughout Europe, North America, and later Asia. American potato salad most likely originated from recipes brought to the U.S. by way of European immigrants during the nineteenth century.

Potato salad is generally served cold or at room temperature. Ingredients often include mayonnaise or a comparable substitute (such as yogurt or sour cream), herbs, and raw vegetables (such as onion and celery, dill). Austrian and south German-style potato salad is served warm or at room temperature and is made with a vinaigrette. North German potato salad is served cold or at room temperature. It is typically made with mayonnaise, hard-boiled egg and sweet or sour pickles. The American-style potato salad is likely to have originated from this version. Asian-style potato salad is similar to American-style potato salad, but has a sweeter and eggier flavor.

British potato salad is served chilled. It is usually made with mayonnaise, Dijon mustard, onions, spring onions, and chives. Spices such as allspice and turmeric are sometimes included.

=== American potato salad ===
The earliest known American potato salad recipes date back to the mid-19th century and are rooted in German cuisine, which was introduced to the United States by European settlers. Early American potato salad was made from cooked potatoes that were typically dressed with oil, vinegar, and herbs.

=== French potato salad ===
French potato salad is a lighter and more flavorful version of potato salad, which uses olive oil and vinegar or mustard instead of mayonnaise. It is often accompanied by fresh herbs and vegetables. In France there are several recipes depending on the region. In Alsace and Lorraine, potato salads are made in a similar way as the German version. In Normandy, salade cauchoise is a potato salad where watercress and celery sticks are added together with a bit of crème fraiche.

=== Japanese potato salad ===
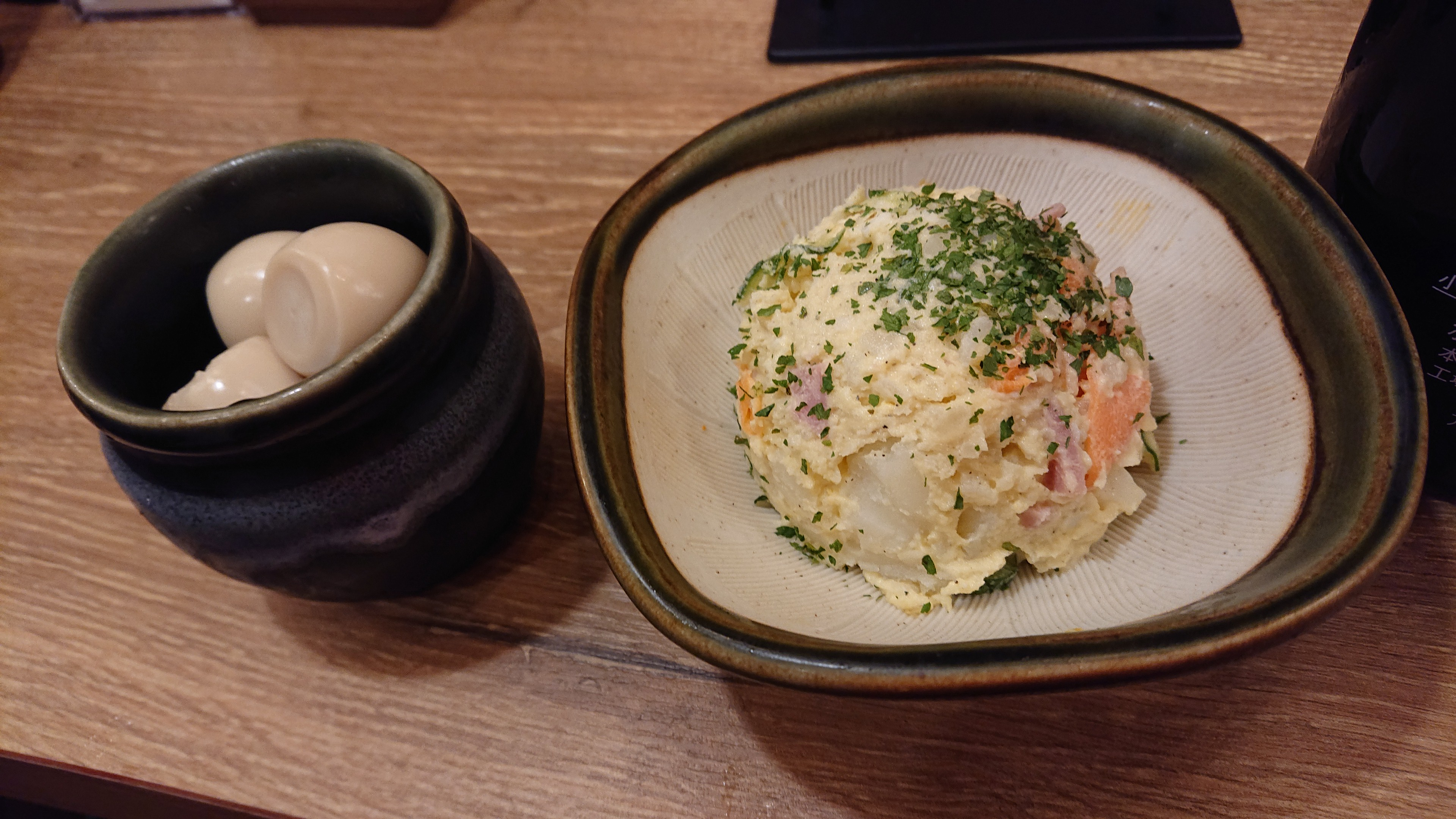
Japanese potato salad with Japanese quail eggs

A version of potato salad in Japan is known as potetosarada ポテトサラダ (or potesara ポテサラ), an English loanword portmanteau.

During the Meiji and Taisho eras, most potato-based salads were dressed with oil or butter instead of the commonplace mayonnaise used in modern culture, reflecting German or French culinary influences. Some recipes incorporated Japanese ingredients such as Japanese parsley (seri), Chinese chives (nira), and udo (Japanese spikenard). Potato salad, common in Japan today, is made witha mayonnaise-style dressing influenced by Russian and American traditions in the 1950's.

It consists of the primary potato salad ingredients (mashed boiled potatoes, chopped onions) mixed with a dressing of mayonnaise, rice vinegar, and karashi mustard. Carrot, cucumber, ham, and mashed boiled eggs, corn, and apple can also be added to the salad as desired.

=== Russian potato salad ===
Olivier salad typically includes potatoes, mayonnaise, boiled eggs, sometimes boiled carrots and pickled cucumbers, and canned or frozen green peas. Chopped parsley is commonly used as a garnish.

The original recipe included more expensive and special ingredients, such as game and caviar, but over time, the ingredients were simplified and adapted to local cuisines.

=== Czech Republic ===
In the Czech Republic potato salad is eaten for Christmas as a side dish.

== See also ==
- List of salads
- Egg salad
- Macaroni salad
- Pasta salad
