= Pantesca salad =

Typical dish of the island of Pantelleria

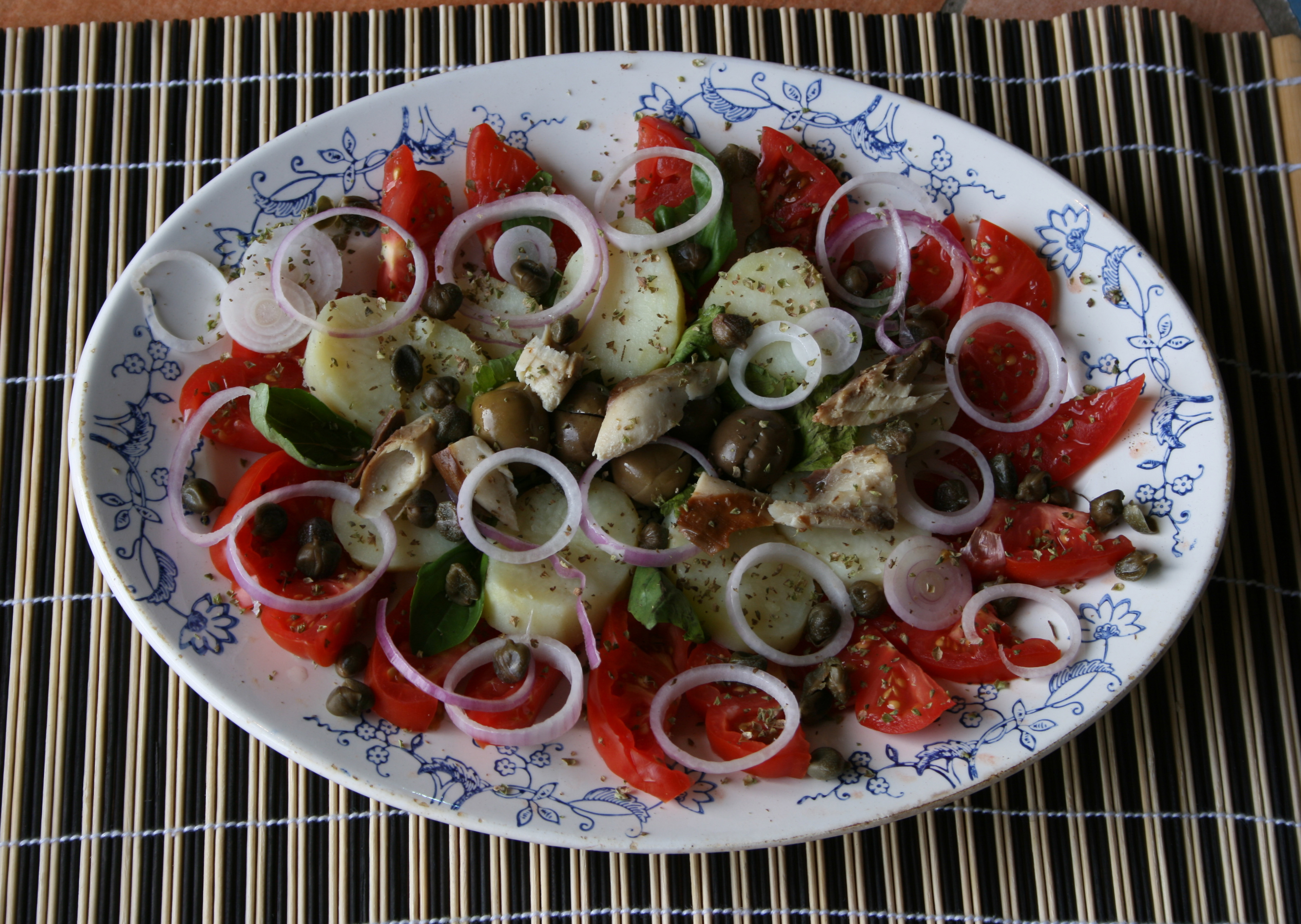
- Alternative names: Insalata pantesca (in Italian)
- Place of origin: Italy
- Region or state: Pantelleria, Sicily
- Main ingredients: Potatoes, tomatoes, red onions, olives, capers, oregano, olive oil, mackerel

Pantesca salad (Italian: insalata pantesca) is a typical dish of the island of Pantelleria. It is prepared with boiled potatoes, tomatoes, and red onions and seasoned with pitted olives, Pantelleria capers, oregano, and olive oil. It is usually accompanied by mackerel in oil, but also by typical fresh cheeses such as tumma or boiled egg pieces. In ancient times, roasted dried fish was used instead of mackerel.

== See also ==
Media related to Insalata pantesca at Wikimedia Commons

- Sicilian cuisine
- List of salads
