= Candle salad =

Fruit salad from the United States

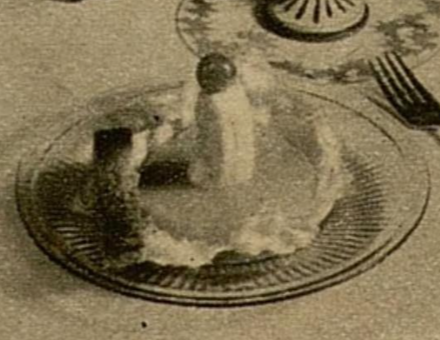
- Candle salad from 1926
- Type: Fruit salad
- Main ingredients: Lettuce, pineapple, banana, cherry, mayonnaise

Candle salad, or candlestick salad, is a fruit salad that was popular in the United States from the 1920s through the 1950s, assembled to resemble a lit candle. The salad typically includes a base of lettuce and pineapple supporting an upright, cut banana, with an almond or a maraschino cherry fixed on top to resemble a flame.

Early publications of candle salad recipes appeared in the 1910s, and by the 1920s it was popularly served at holidays and among women, away from men prone to make jokes about its appearance. During the 1950s, the candle salad was associated with children, and recipes were published in cookbooks written for a young audience. By the middle of the decade, segments of the population were beginning to view candle salads as old-fashioned, and over the next few years they fell from popularity. In the 21st century, its appearance is most often understood as phallic and is most often invoked as a punchline.

== Description ==
Candle, or candlestick salads, are fruit salads assembled to resemble a lit candle. A typical preparation involves a base of a canned pineapple slice on top of a lettuce leaf. The pineapple's hole is used to support half a banana stood upright, representing the candle. Whipped cream or mayonnaise is poured over this candlestick as the melted candlewax element, the latter sometimes colored red to further the effect. At the banana's top, a "flame" is created with an almond or maraschino cherry. Some recipe writers recommend making the representation literal by setting the almond on fire.

Several recipes substituting the typical elements of the candle salad have been published. Among these, orange slices or molded gelatin have been used in place of pineapple, high fat nuts or pimento for the flame, and green peppers or celery for the handle of the candle stick. One variation, published in 2008 as an attempt to produce a healthy adaptation, used strawberry yogurt to represent candle wax, alfalfa sprouts as a base, and a fresh strawberry for a flame.

== History ==
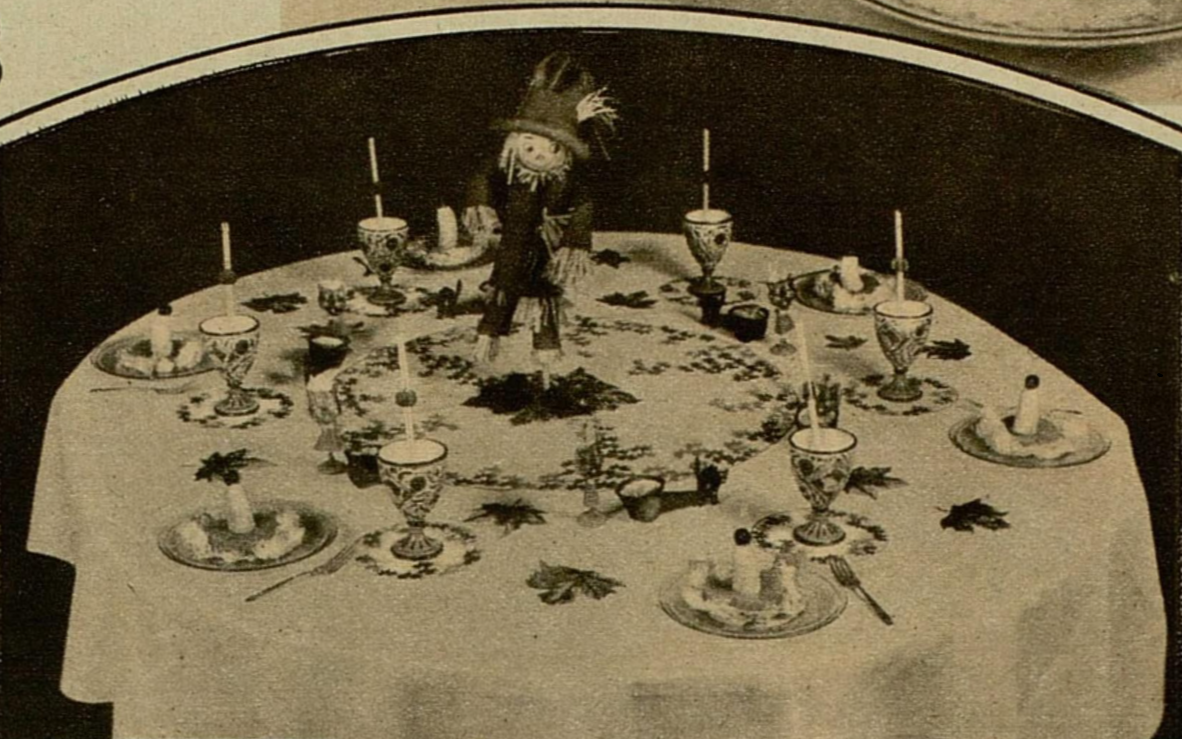
A 1926 children's Halloween party, the table set with candle salads

The earliest mention of a candle salad identified by Lynne Olver's website The Food Timeline appeared in 1916, within a socialite menu published by an Ohio newspaper. This mention was bare, including neither description nor recipe. Through the following decade, recipes for candle salads appeared in cookbooks and newspapers, and were viewed as exceptionally creative. Salads at this time were perceived as unruly and in need of ordering, meaning those resembling non-salad objects were held out as an ideal. Historian Elizabeth Aldrich describes this attitude as within a "movement of food as illusion" that had begun late in the previous century. The dish's popularity is credited by Olver and food writer Diana Hubbell as likely the product of large corporations marketing canned pineapple to the American public.

Through the 1920s, candle salads were typically served at lunches held for women, to avoid the jokes men often made referencing the salad's phallic appearance, and at Christmas and Halloween events. This association with holidays was highlighted by recipe writers, such as in a 1928 piece in The Philadelphia Tribune: "The old Christmas Candle Salad has been so popular for so many generations that at this time of year it is as much entitled to appear in print once more as is the story of Santa and his famous reindeer."

In the 1950s, cookbooks contained recipes for candle salads targeted to audiences of children. According to Aldrich, this was due to the recipe's ease of preparation, and there being no need to use knives or other potentially hazardous tools. One such recipe appeared in the 1950 edition of A Child's First Cook Book by Alma Lach, one of the first cookbooks written for children. In another, published in the 1957 edition of the Betty Crocker's Cook Book for Boys and Girls, a description that "it's better than a real candle because you can eat it" was affixed. In a 1960s edition of the Betty Crocker's New Boys and Girls Cookbook, the salad was renamed "rocket salad" in reference to the Space Race. The salads did not often appear in cookbooks for adult audiences, although a rare exception appeared as a "Christmas Candle Salad" version, which swapped a pineapple base for raspberry gelatin molded into stars. Publications at this time did not characterize the dish's appearance as phallic.

Modern recreations
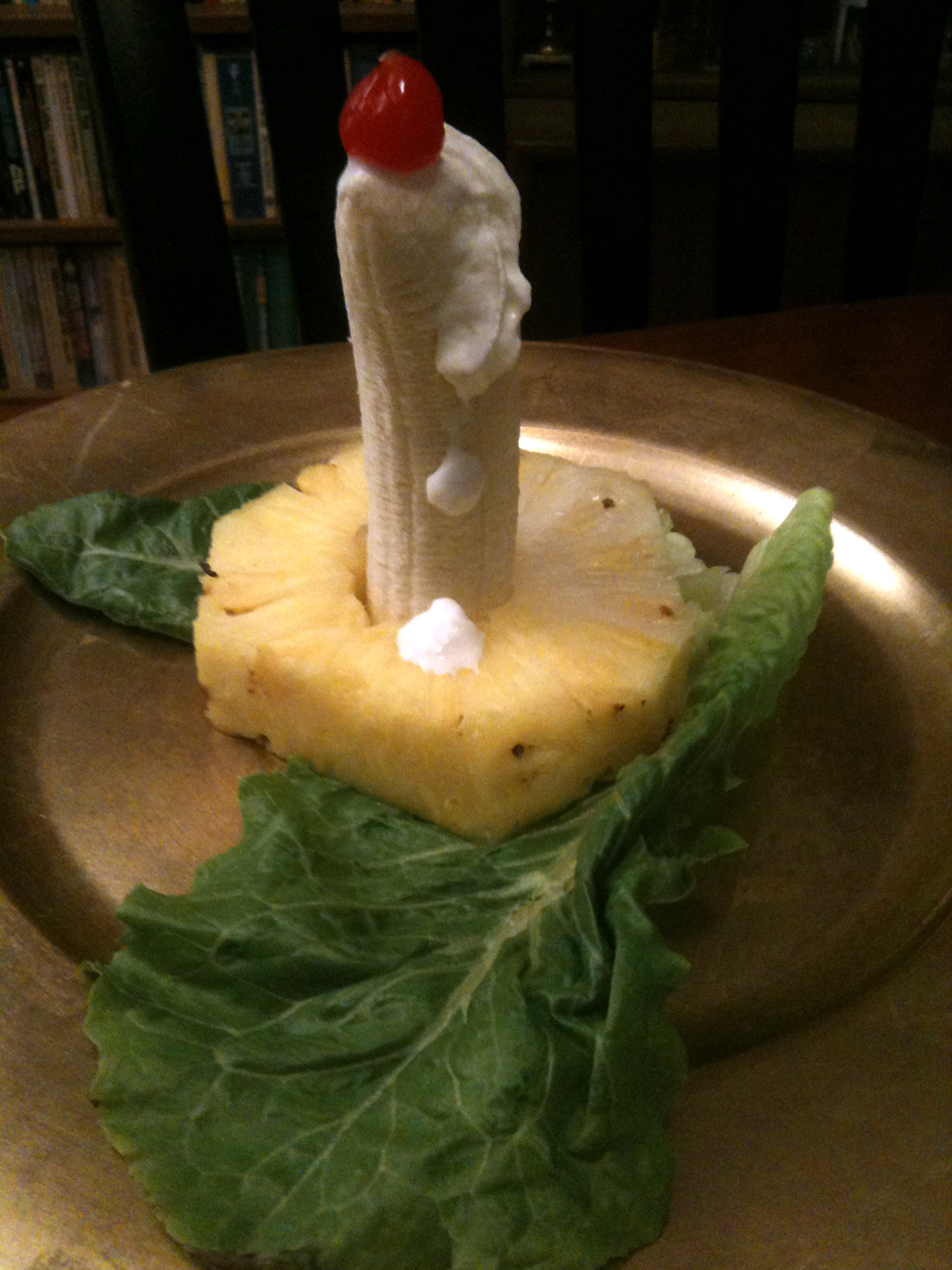
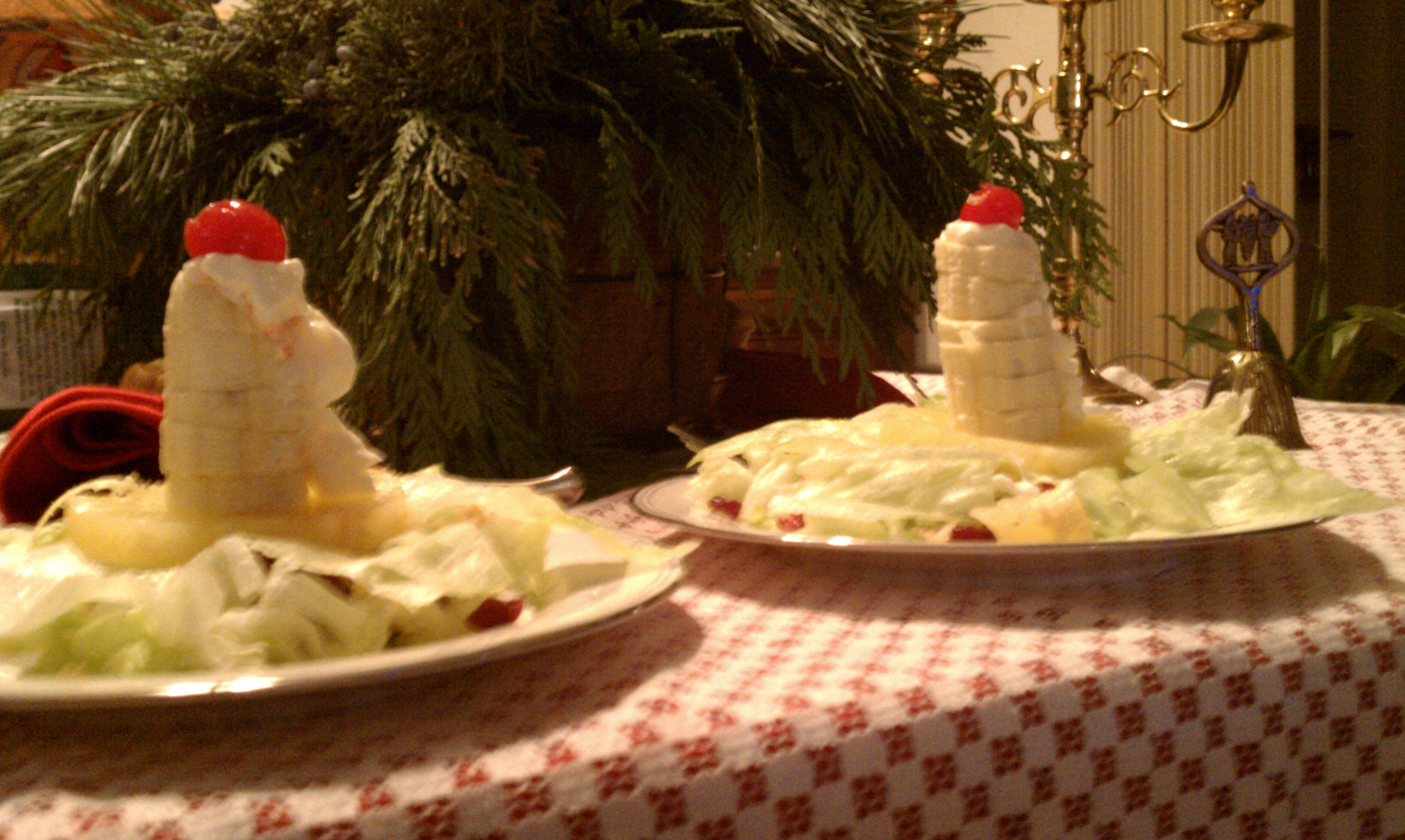

By the mid-1950s, candle salads were beginning to be perceived among the cultural elite as old-fashioned, even as they continued to be eaten by much of the population. A 1954 review of new cookbooks called out the dish specifically, describing them as "that bridge-club pest of yesteryear". The sentiment was echoed by the chef James Beard in 1972, when he stated that in the 1950s, candle salads, alongside Butterfly salads and Santa Claus salads, "prevailed at luncheons and dinner parties and were served up covered with appalling sweet dressings and decorated with maraschino cherries".

A 1977 episode of The Bod Squad (a series of short public service announcements broadcast on Saturday mornings on the ABC television network) titled "Make a Saturdae" presented a modified candle salad recipe which substituted plain yogurt for the traditional mayonnaise or whipped cream and a white grape in place of the maraschino cherry.

In the 21st century, the candle salad became a source of humor on TV and social media for its appearance, widely perceived as phallic. Comedian Amy Sedaris made the dish for late-night host Jimmy Fallon in 2012 and then again in 2017 on At Home with Amy Sedaris; following the former, Vulture described the dish as "probably the only arts and crafts project on TV to ever run the risk of being blurred out by the network censors". Another recreation was done in a 2021 video by B. Dylan Hollis, a social media personality, in which he quipped, "No man this Valentine’s Day? No problem!".

== See also ==
- Jello salad
- List of salads

== Sources ==
- Aldrich, Elizabeth (2023). Casseroles, Can Openers, and Jell-O: American Food and the Cold War, 1947–1959. State University of New York Press. ISBN 978-1-438-49306-0.
- Lovegren, Sylvia (1995). Fashionable Food: Seven Decades of Food Fads. New York: Macmillan. ISBN 978-0-02-575705-9.
- Shapiro, Laura (2004). Something from the oven: Reinventing Dinner in 1950s America. Waterville, Maine: Thorndike Press. ISBN 0-7862-6693-7.
- Crocker, Betty (1957). Betty Crocker's Cookbook for Boys and Girls. New York: Golden Press.
