= Yum sen lon =

Salad from Laos

Yum sen lon is a Laotian salad. It is served with watercress, lettuce, tomato, and boiled egg, with mayonnaise and peanuts.

== See also ==
- List of salads
