= Esqueixada =

Catalan fish salad

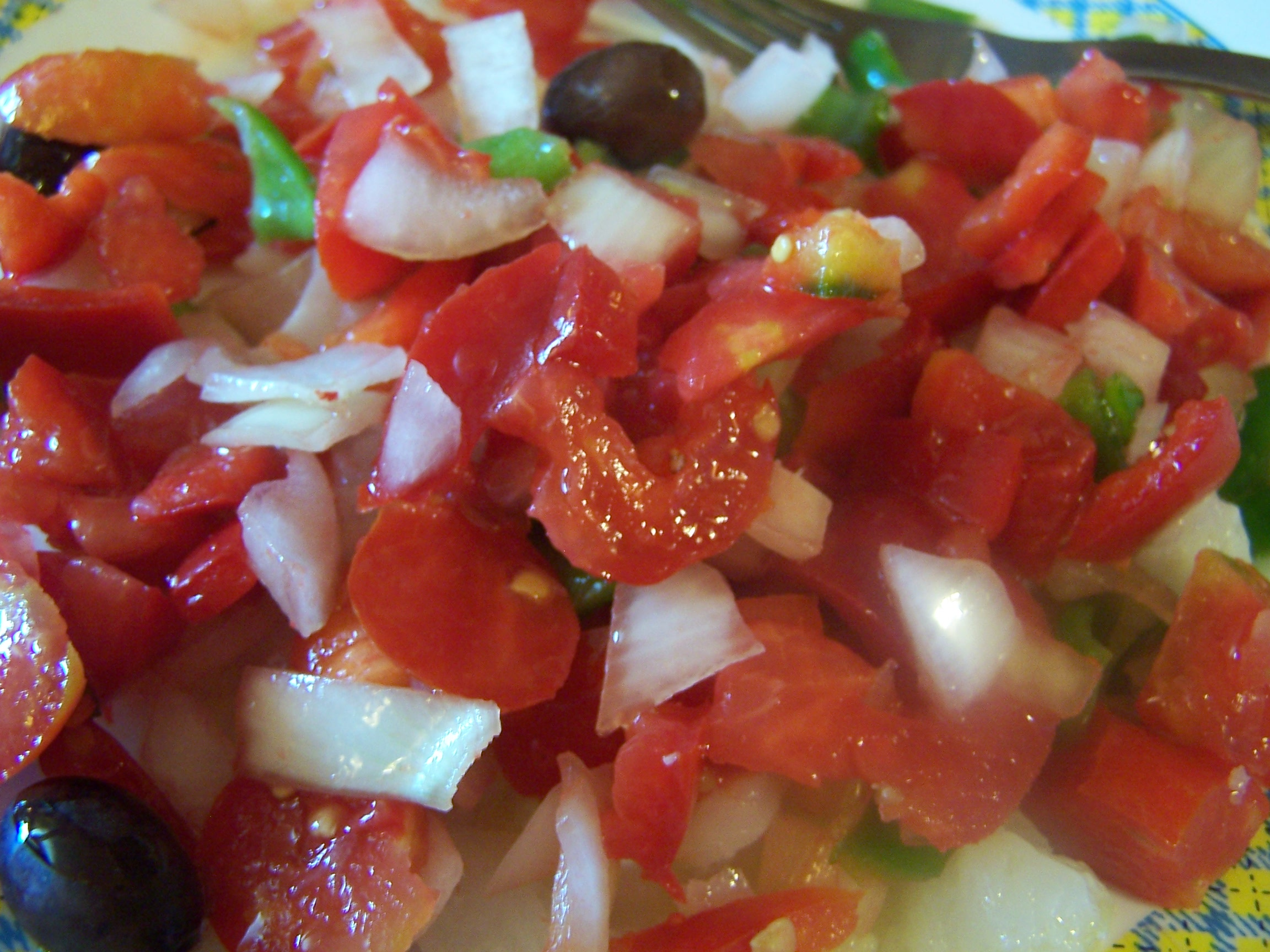
Esqueixada

Esqueixada (Catalan pronunciation: [əskəˈʃaðə]) is a traditional Catalan dish, a salad of shredded salt cod, tomatoes, onions, olive oil and vinegar, salt, and sometimes a garnish of olives or hard-boiled eggs. Specific recipes vary, with some including ingredients such as eggplant and bell peppers. Esqueixada is particularly popular in warm weather and is sometimes considered a summertime dish. It is often served as a tapas dish.

Esqueixada is sometimes described as the "Catalan ceviche" because it is made with raw fish (although the cod is salt-cured and dried) in a marinade. The name of the dish comes from the Catalan verb esqueixar, to tear or shred. The salt cod in the dish is always shredded with the fingers, never sliced or chopped, to achieve the correct texture.

== See also ==
- salvitxada
- esgarrat
- List of salads
