= Esgarrat =

Valencian cod dish

Esgarraet
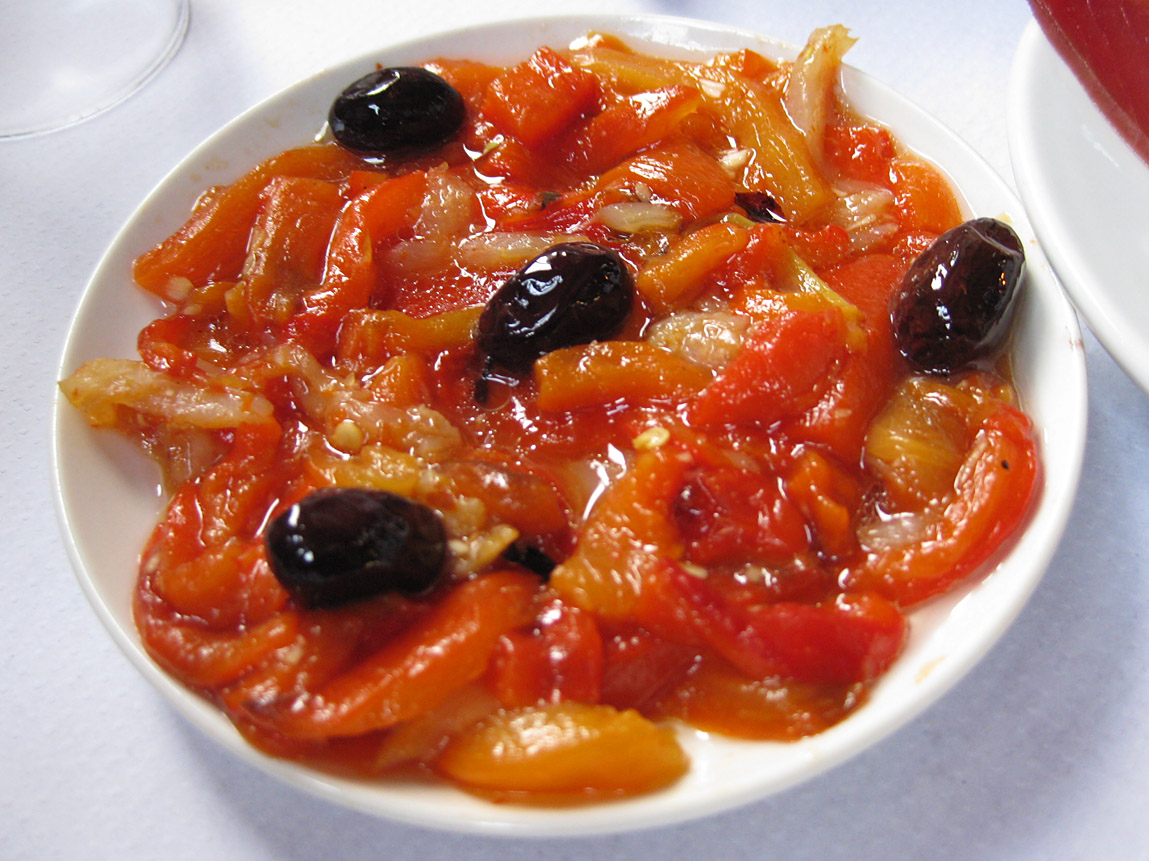
- Type: Salad
- Place of origin: Spain
- Region or state: Valencia
- Serving temperature: Room temperature
- Main ingredients: Red peppers, salt cod, garlic, olive oil, sometimes black olives

Esgarraet (from Valencian esgarradet, meaning "torn apart") is a typical dish from the Valencian community in Spain. It consists of grilled red pepper salad, cured cod, garlic, olive oil. Some variations also add black olives. The name derives from the preparation technique that requires to rip both the peppers and the fish in fine strips.

It is also served as tapa and is very typical for the city of Valencia. It is very popular, as the flavour of the salt cod fish contrasts very well with the sweetness of the peppers and its juice that mixes with the olive oil is commonly soaked up with bread.

== Variations ==
In Valencia, this dish may be considered as a variation of espencat, another popular dish of the Valencian cuisine. In Catalonia, there is a variation that is called esqueixada which means "torn" or "ripped" in Catalan and features grilled tomato instead of red peppers. In the central region of Castellón, baked eggplant is added and all ingredients are chopped into little pieces. The recipe may also include Mojama or cod fish.

== See also ==
- Escalivada
- Esqueixada
- List of salads
