= Szałot =

Silesian potato salad

Sałatka jarzynowa
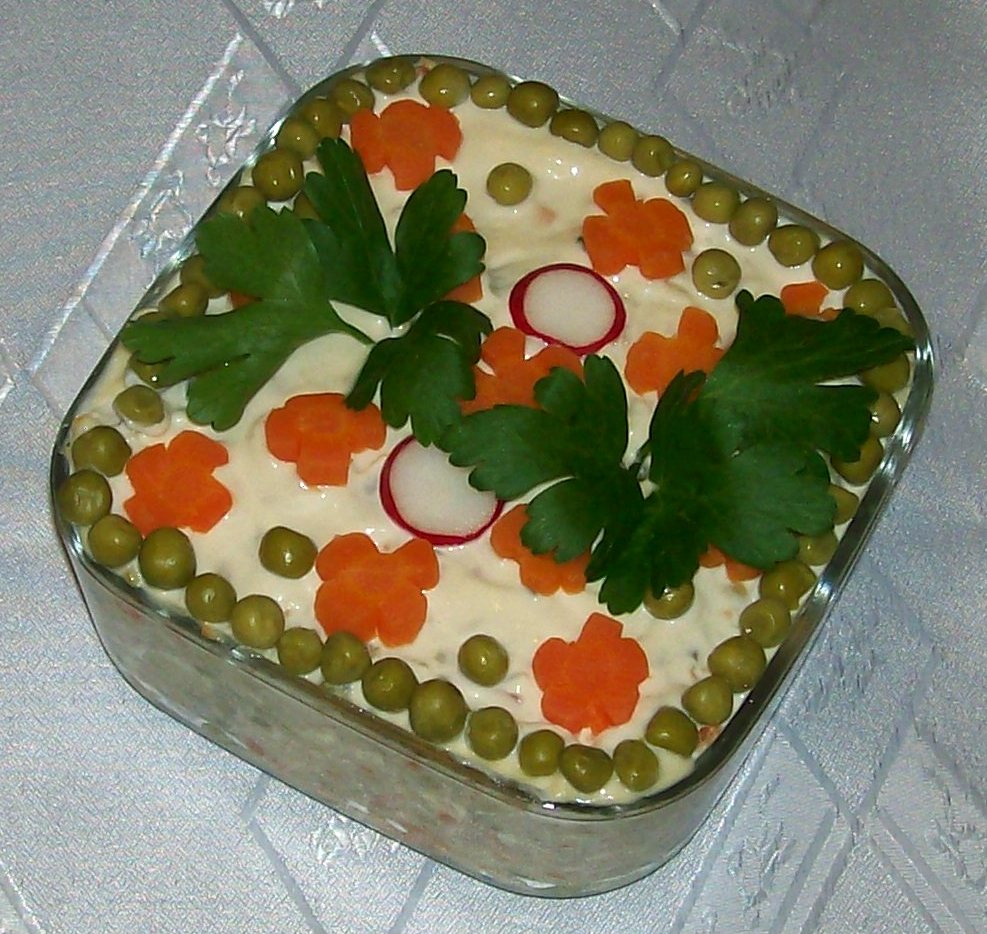
- Course: Side dish
- Place of origin: Silesia
- Main ingredients: potatoes

Szałot (Silesian pronunciation: [ˈʂawɔt]) is a Silesian potato salad. It can be made with diced, boiled potatoes, carrots, peas, ham, various sausages, fish, boiled eggs, and bonded with olive oil or mayonnaise. There are many variations on the dish. In 2006, szałot was placed on the Polish Ministry of Agriculture and Rural Development's list of regional and traditional foods.
