= Michigan salad =

Variety of green salad

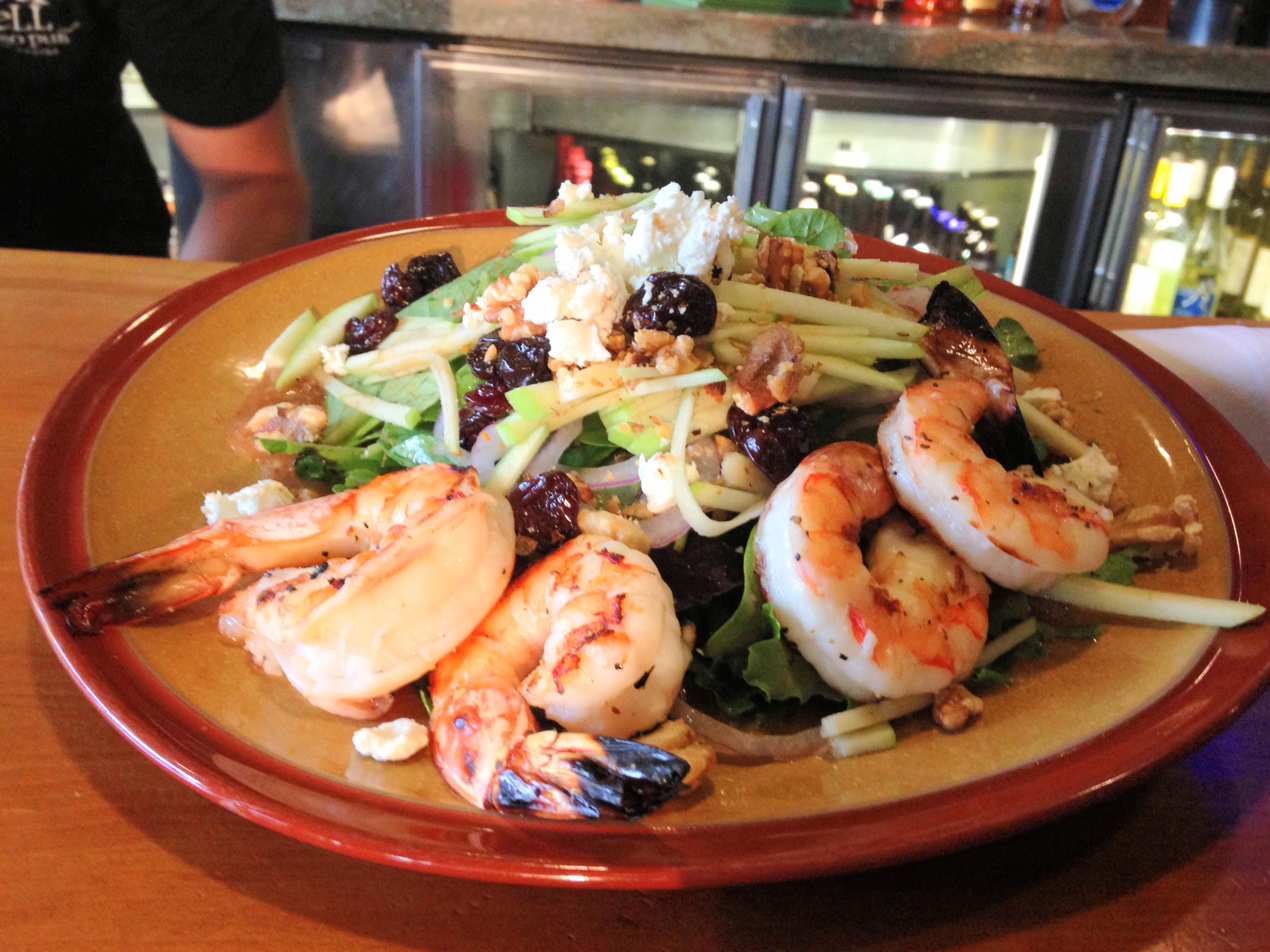
- A Michigan salad with grilled shrimp
- Type: Salad
- Place of origin: United States
- Region or state: Michigan
- Main ingredients: Salad greens, dried cherries or cranberries, blue cheese, vinaigrette; sometimes walnuts or pecans

A Michigan salad is a type of green salad popular at restaurants in the Detroit area and other parts of Michigan. It is typically topped with dried cherries, blue cheese, and a vinaigrette dressing. Some recipes use dried cranberries instead of cherries, add other kinds of fruit such as apple or mandarin orange, omit or substitute the blue cheese, and/or add walnuts or pecans.

In Western Michigan, a Michigan salad might include grapes, sliced apples, and walnuts or pecans. It often will have a mayonnaise- and mustard-based dressing, rather than a vinaigrette.

== See also ==
- Waldorf salad
- List of salads
