= Lyutika =

Bulgarian vegetable dish

- Type: Salad
- Place of origin: Bulgaria
- Serving temperature: Cold
- Main ingredients: Peppers, tomatoes, garlic, onions, vegetable oil

Lyutika (Bulgarian: лютика, pronounced [liuˈtika]) is a traditional vegetable mixture — salad or chunky relish, popular in the northern part of Bulgaria. It is consumed in the summer. Basic lyutika is made from roasted peppers, tomatoes, garlic, onions, and vegetable oil usually crushed with a pestle in a mortar. Often chopped parsley is added. Lyutika is served cold. The name comes from the pungent taste (lyut, meaning hot, pungent).

There are varieties of lyutika that include yogurt, sirene (white cheese), hardboiled eggs, or chunks of cooked chicken breasts.

== See also ==
- List of salads
