= Glasswort salad =

Turkish salad

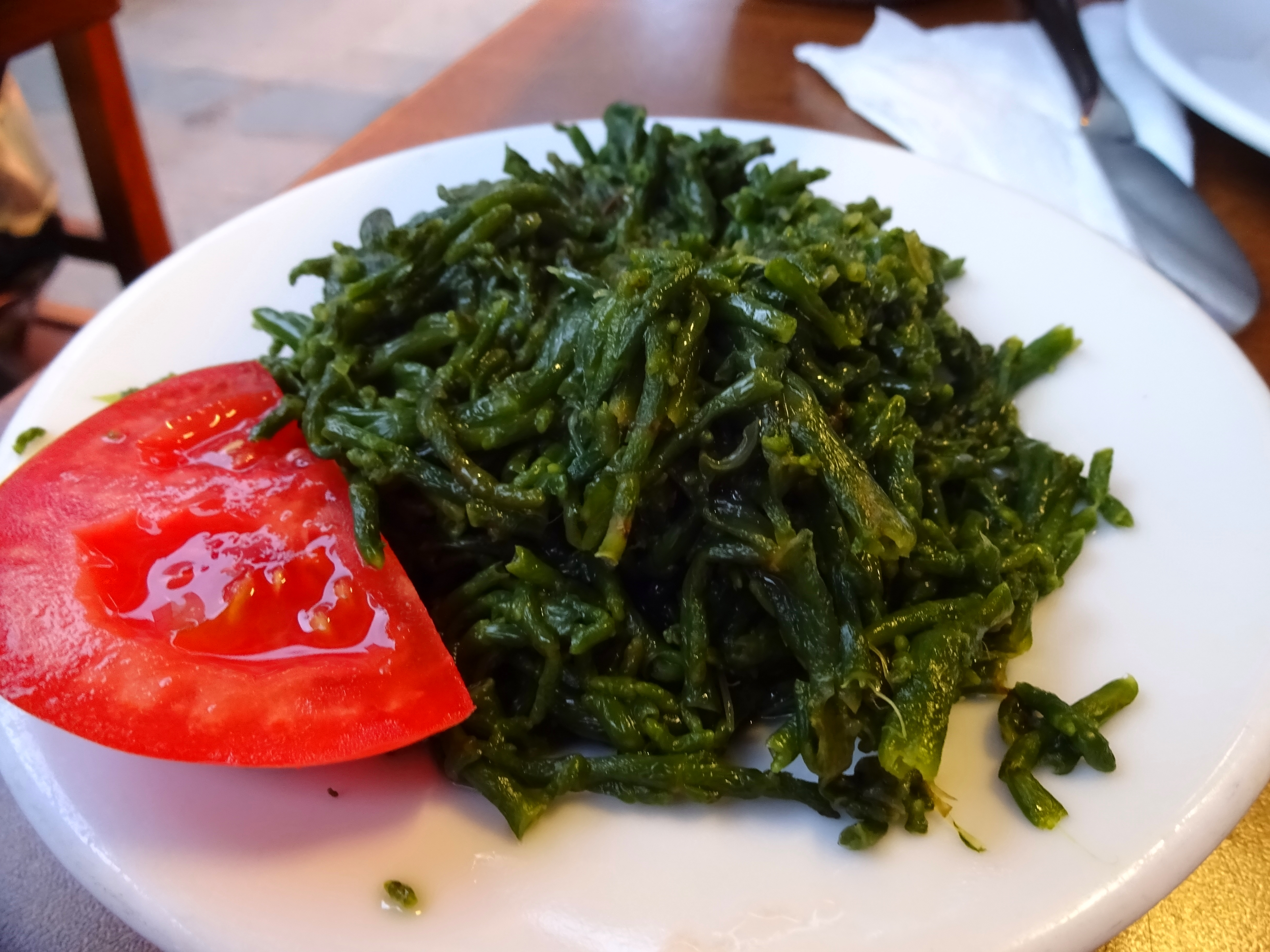
- Place of origin: Turkey
- Main ingredients: Glasswort, lemon juice, garlic, olive oil

Glasswort salad or samphire salad (Turkish: Deniz börülcesi salatası) is a salad in Turkish cuisine. Glasswort salad is made with glasswort, lemon juice, olive oil and garlic. It is commonly served as a meze.

== Variations ==
- Beyaz peynirli kuru domatesli deniz börülcesi salatası(Glasswort salad with Sun-dried tomato and beyaz peynir)
- Karidesli deniz börülcesi salatası(Glasswort salad with shrimp)

== See also ==
- List of salads
