= Shalgam =

Salad from Kazakhstan and Kyrgyzstan

Shalgam is a traditional salad from Kazakhstan and Kyrgyzstan. It is made from radishes (shalgam), sweet Bulgarian bell pepper, carrots, onions, garlic and spices.

== See also ==
- Kazakh cuisine
- Kyrgyz cuisine
- List of salads
- Şalgam (a Turkish beverage)
