= Salade cauchoise =

Traditional French potato dish

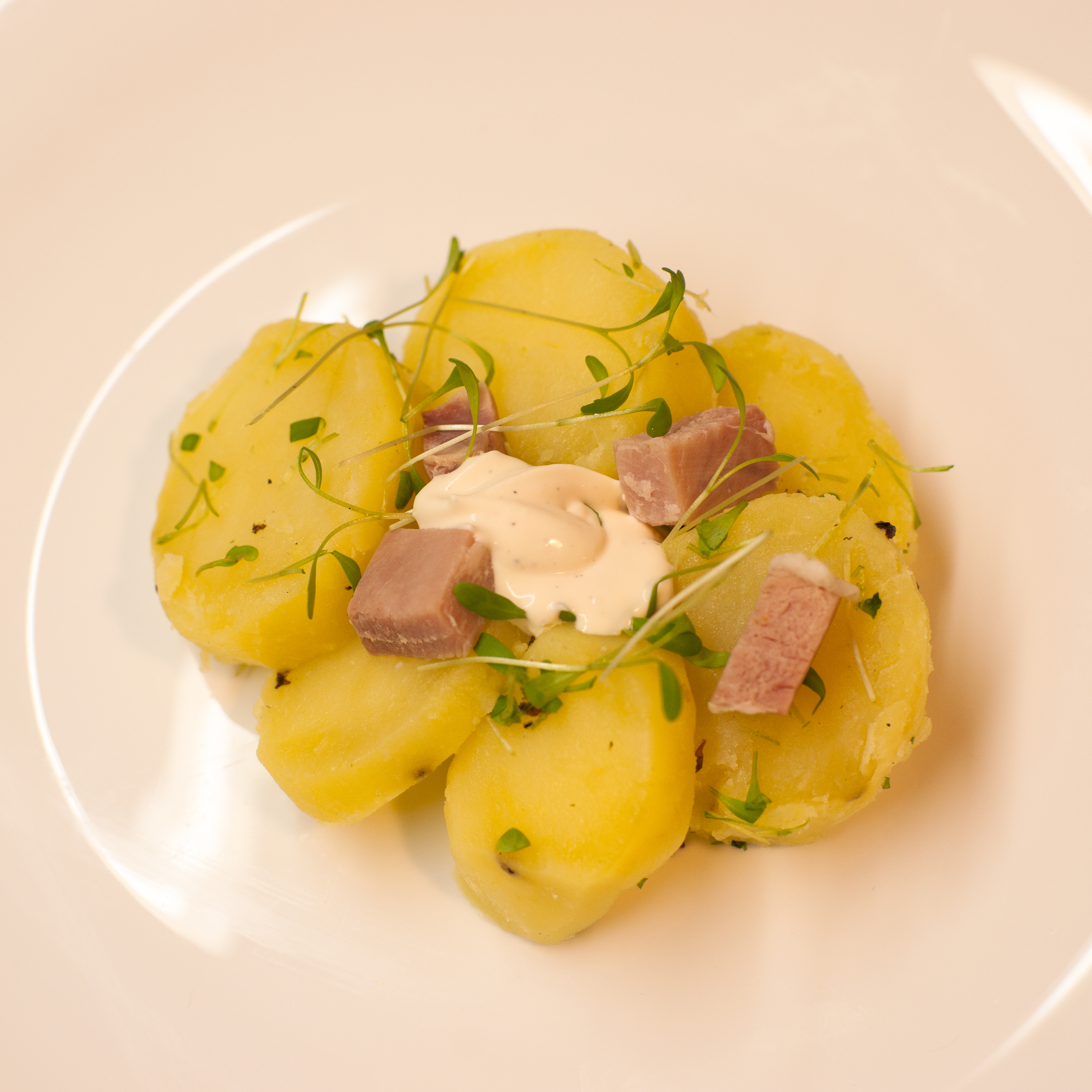
- Place of origin: France
- Region or state: Pays de Caux
- Main ingredients: Potato

Salade cauchoise (French pronunciation: [salad koʃwaz]) is a traditional potato, watercress and celery sticks salad of the cuisine of the Pays de Caux, Normandy, France. Other ingredients sometimes used include diced ham, diced gruyere and walnut kernels. It is seasoned with a Norman cider vinegar and cream dressing.

== See also ==
- List of salads
