= Ummak huriyya =

Tunisian salad dish

Ummak huriyya salad
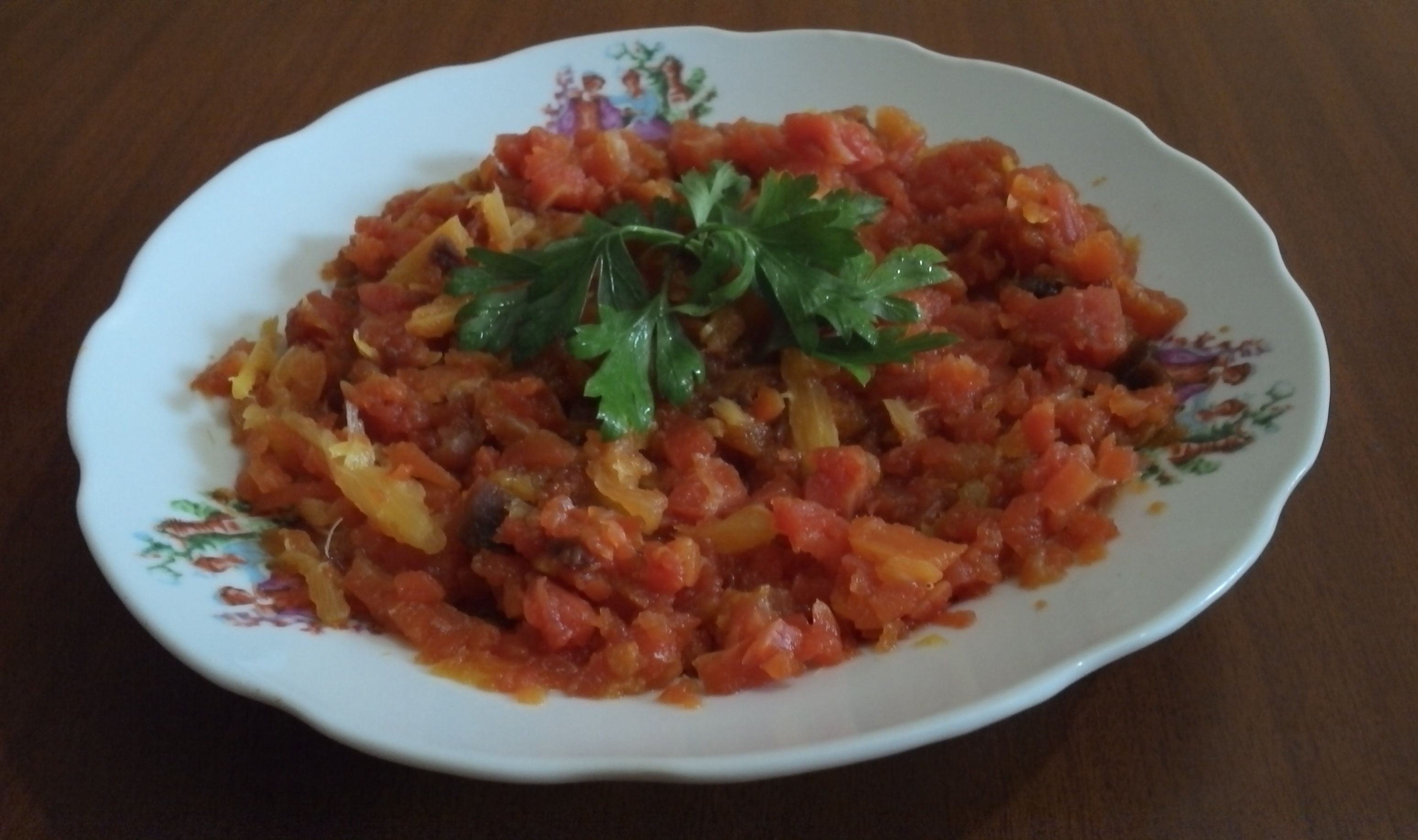
- Alternative names: ʾummak ḥūriyya
- Type: Salad
- Place of origin: Tunisia
- Region or state: Tunisia
- Associated cuisine: Tunisian

Ummak huriyya salad (Arabic: امك حورية) is a Tunisian salad made up of carrots, onions, garlic, salt, spices, harissa, olive oil, lemon juice and then decorated with parsley, olives and eggs.

== See also ==
- List of Arabic salads
