= Masmouta salad =

Tunisian dish

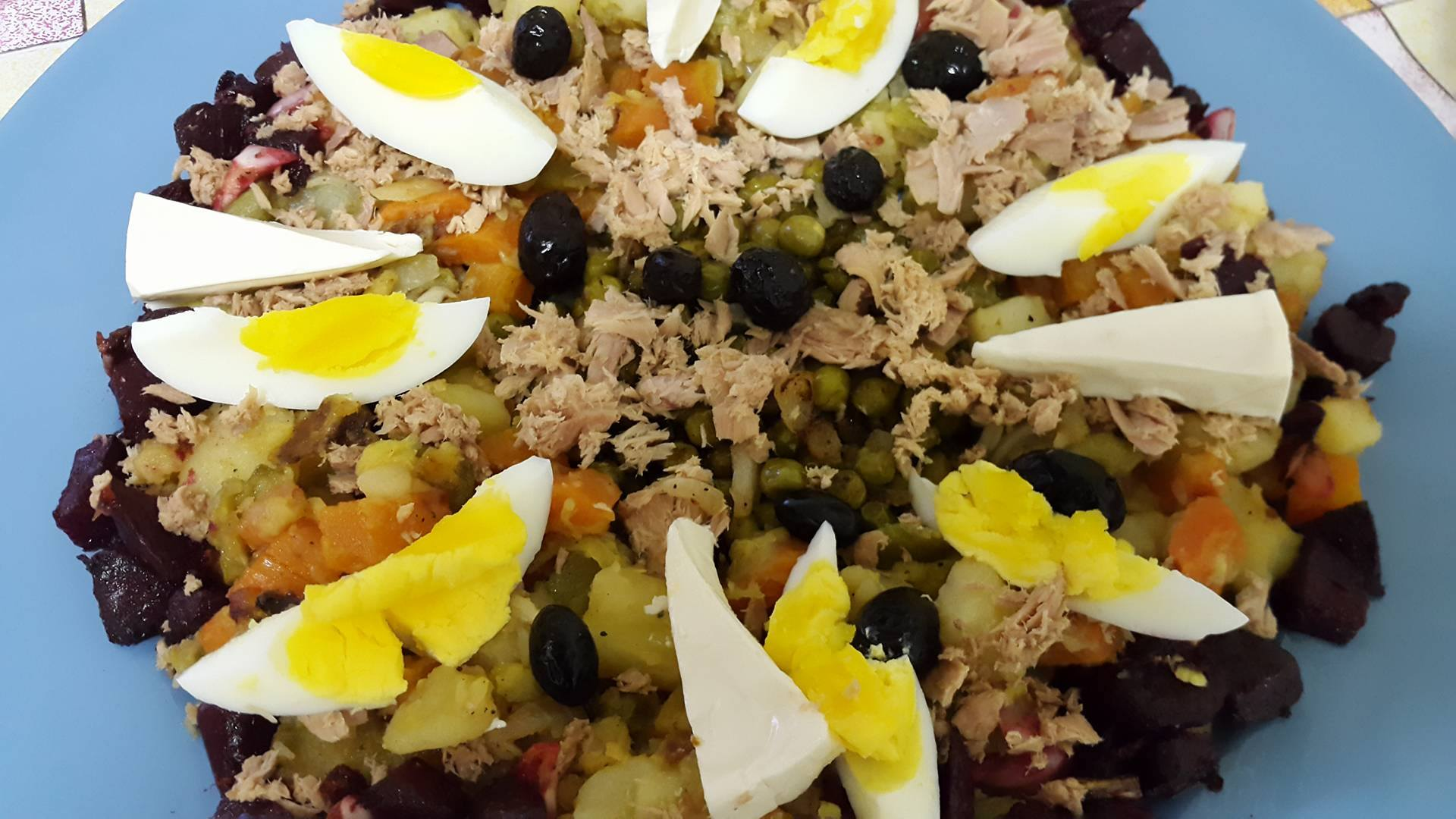
- Alternative names: سلطة مسموطة (Salatha Masmouta)
- Type: Salad
- Place of origin: Tunisia
- Region or state: Arab world

Masmouta salad (Arabic: سلطة مسموطة) is an Arab salad, served with bread and consisted mainly of potatoes, carrots, peas, green gourd and beets as per choice.

== See also ==
- List of Arabic salads
