= Blunkett salad =

Tunisian salad dish

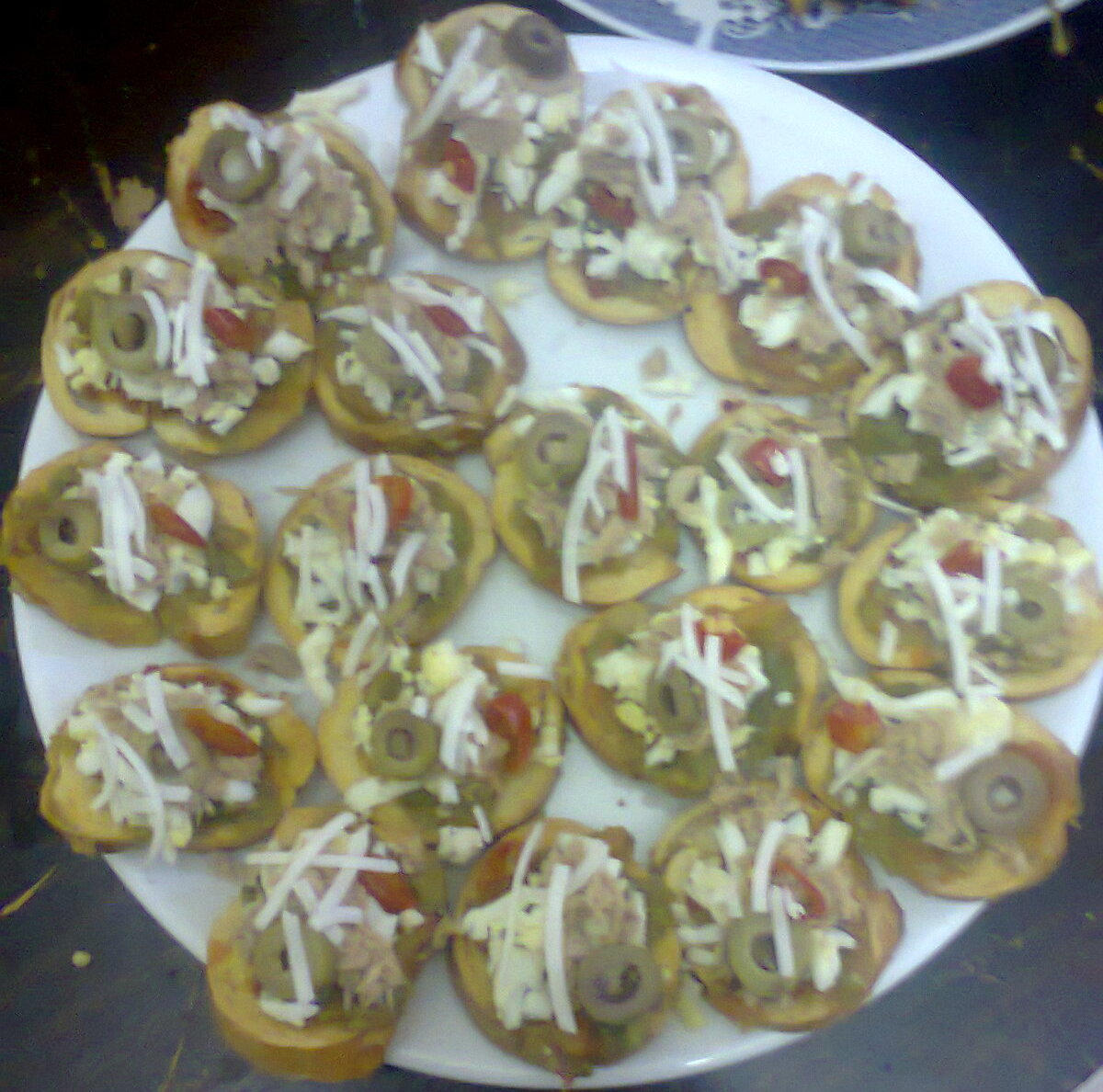
- Alternative names: Blunkett salad
- Type: Salad
- Place of origin: Tunisia
- Region or state: Grand Tunis

Blunkett salad (Arabic: سلطة بلانكيت) is a Tunisian salad that typically consists of bread, harissa, eggs and tuna.

Blunkett salad is a staple in Tunisian cuisine, often served during family gatherings or as part of a mezze platter. Its combination of bread and protein makes it a filling dish, suitable for lunch or dinner. It shares similarities with other Arab salads like fattoush, but is distinguished by its use of harissa and tuna, reflecting North African influences.

== Ingredients and Preparation ==
The salad includes:

- Bread, often crumbled or toasted for texture.
- Harissa, a spicy chili paste made from red peppers, garlic, and spices, adding heat and depth.
- Hard-boiled eggs, providing protein and richness.
- Tuna, typically canned, for a savory, umami flavor.

Preparation involves mixing these ingredients, with the bread sometimes soaked in a dressing made from olive oil, lemon juice, and harissa, then topped with eggs and tuna. It is served at room temperature, making it ideal for communal meals.

== See also ==
- List of Arabic salads
