= Gỏi nhệch =

Vietnamese salad

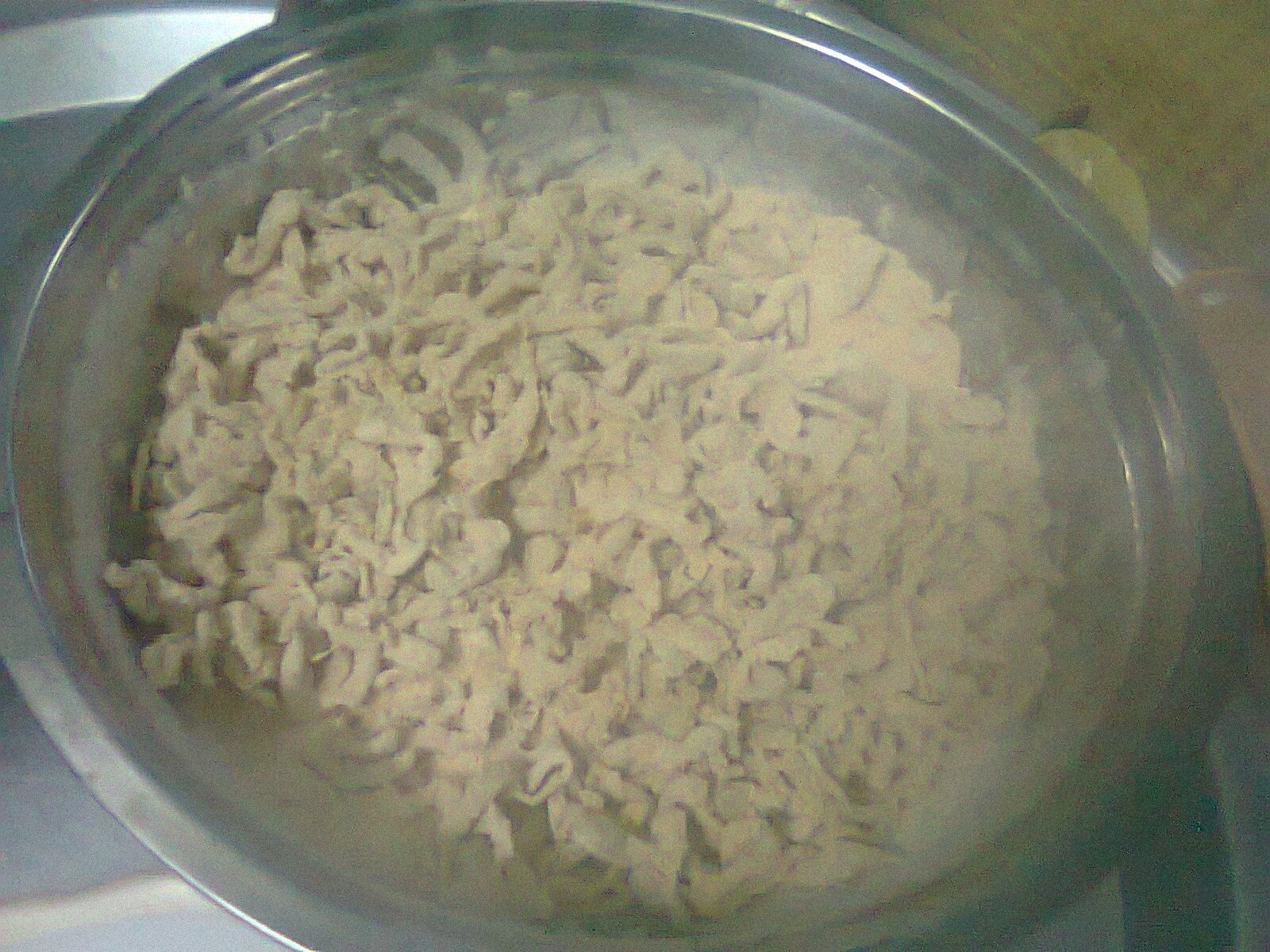
- Type: Salad
- Course: Appetizer
- Place of origin: Vietnam
- Region or state: Northern Vietnam
- Associated cuisine: Vietnamese cuisine
- Serving temperature: Room temperature
- Main ingredients: Mucous fish (Pisodonophis boro), roasted rice powder, herbs, fish sauce

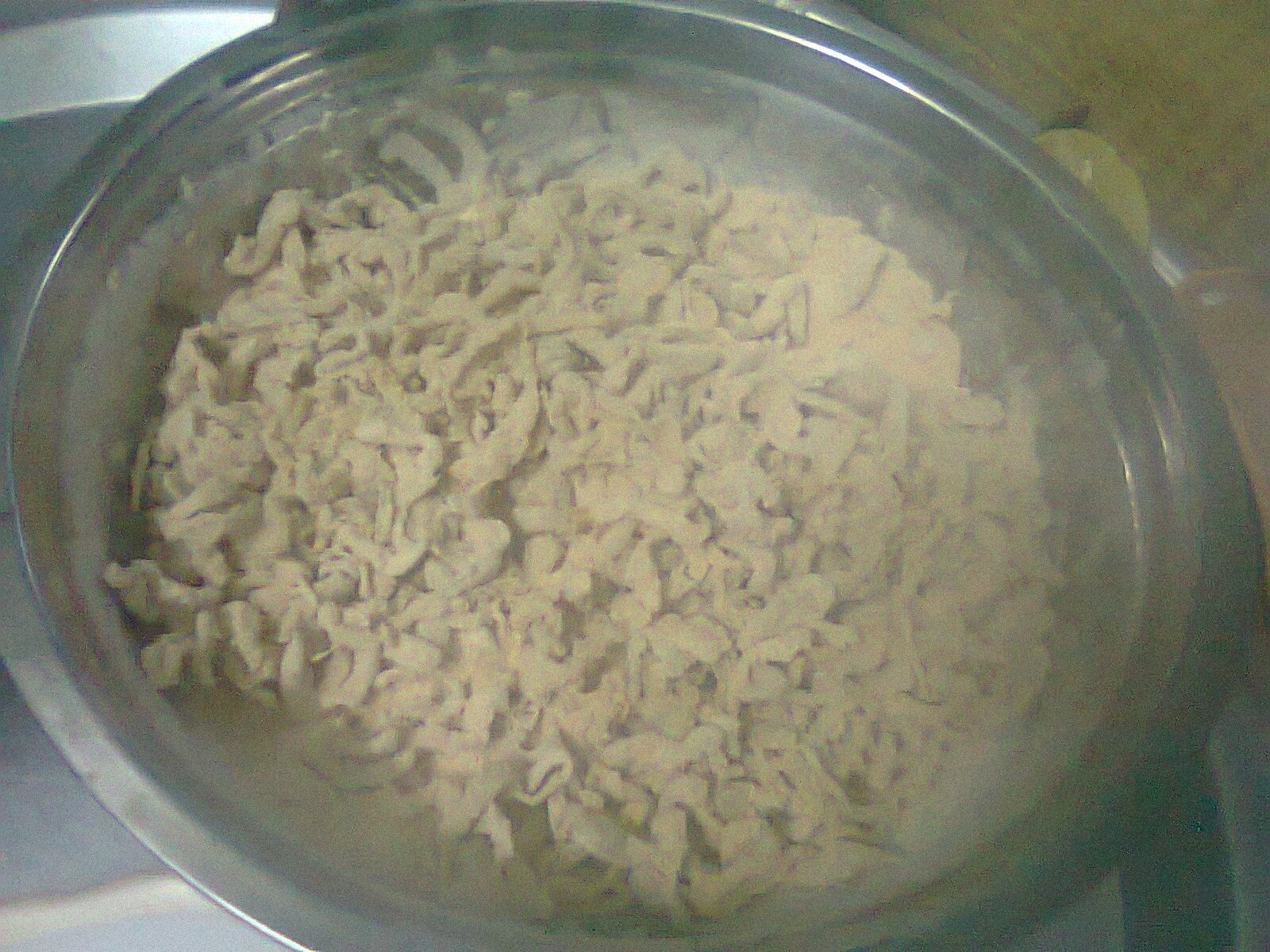
Gỏi nhệch

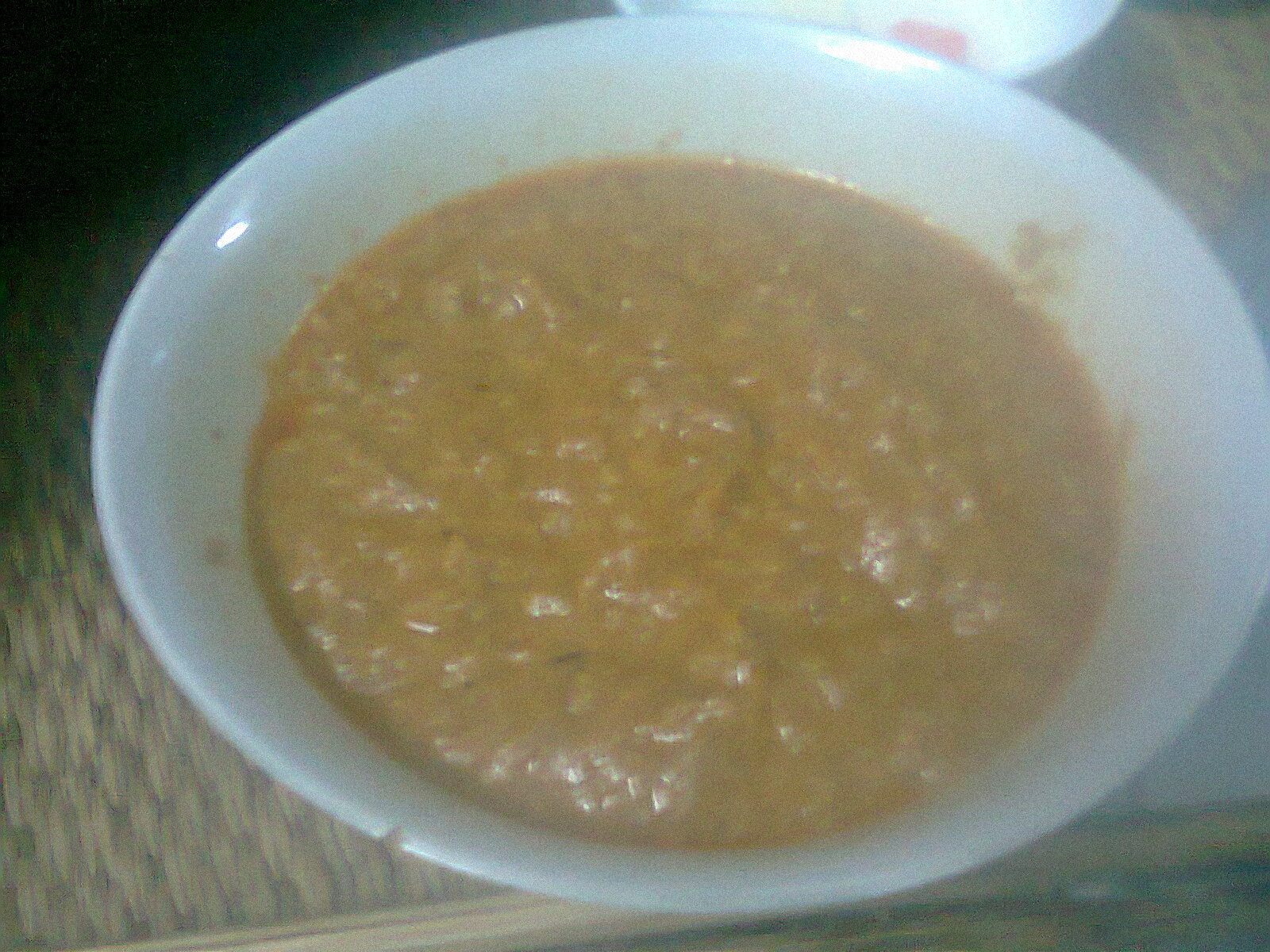
Trẻo (a kind of dipping sauce) used to dip Gỏi nhệch

Gỏi nhệch is a Vietnamese salad made with the small fry of the local paddy field eel (Vietnamese cá nhệch, Latin Pisodonophis boro). It is associated with the Hải Phòng area.

== See also ==
- List of salads
