= Snow White salad =

Bulgarian yogurt salad

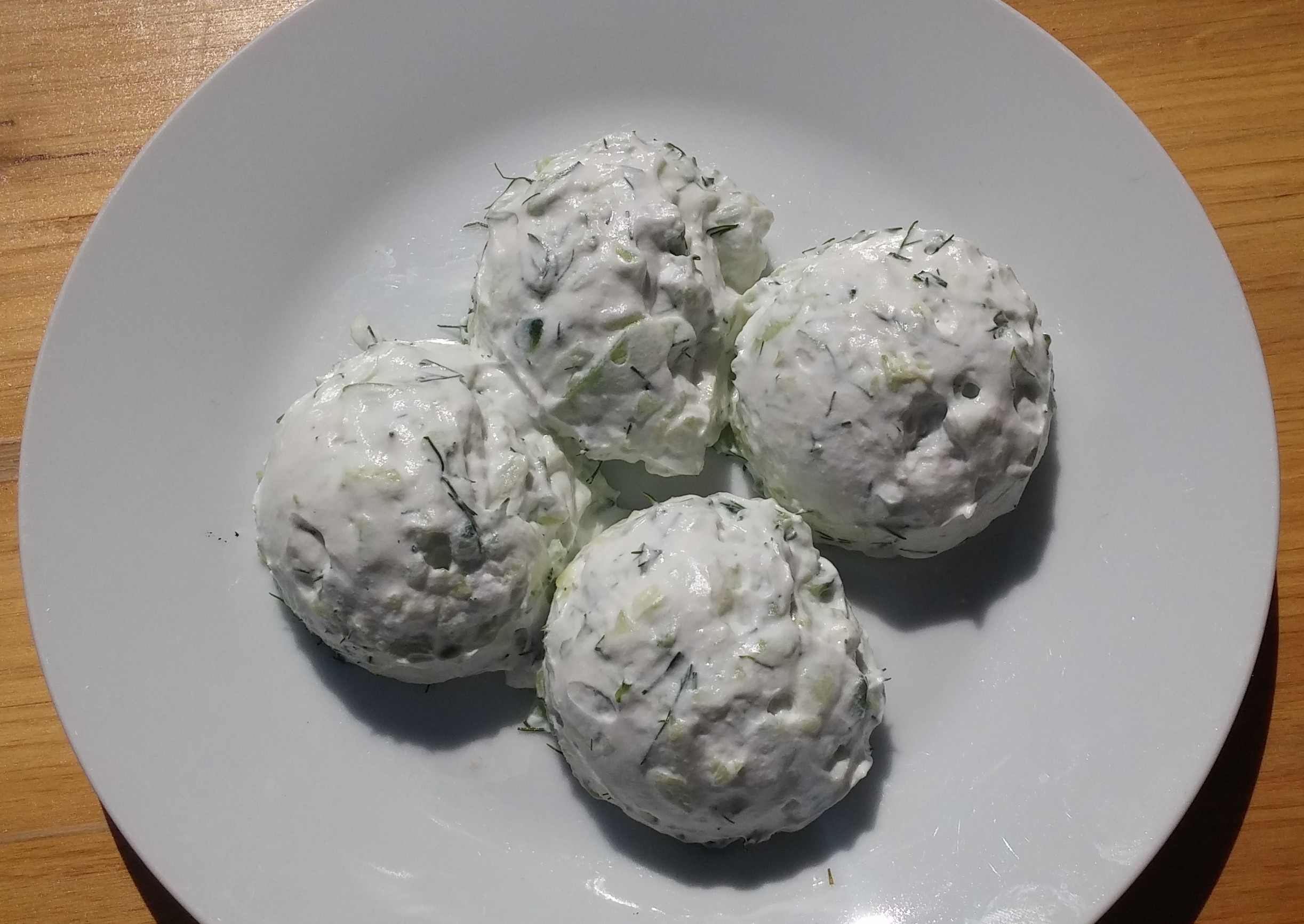
- Alternative names: Snezhanka salad
- Type: Salad
- Course: Appetizer
- Place of origin: Bulgaria
- Main ingredients: Yogurt, cucumbers

Snezhanka salad or Snow White salad (Bulgarian: салата Снежанка) is a traditional Bulgarian salad, which is made of strained yogurt, cucumber, garlic, salt, usually cooking oil, dill, sometimes roasted peppers, walnuts and parsley. Sometimes it is called milk salad (млечна салата, mlechna salata) or dry tarator salad (сух таратор салата, suh tarator salata).

Snezhanka (Snow White) salad derives its name from the fairy tale character Snow White. The reason for the name is the predominantly white color of the salad.

== See also ==
- Tarator
- Tzatziki
