= Levantine cuisine =

Cuisine of the Eastern Mediterranean

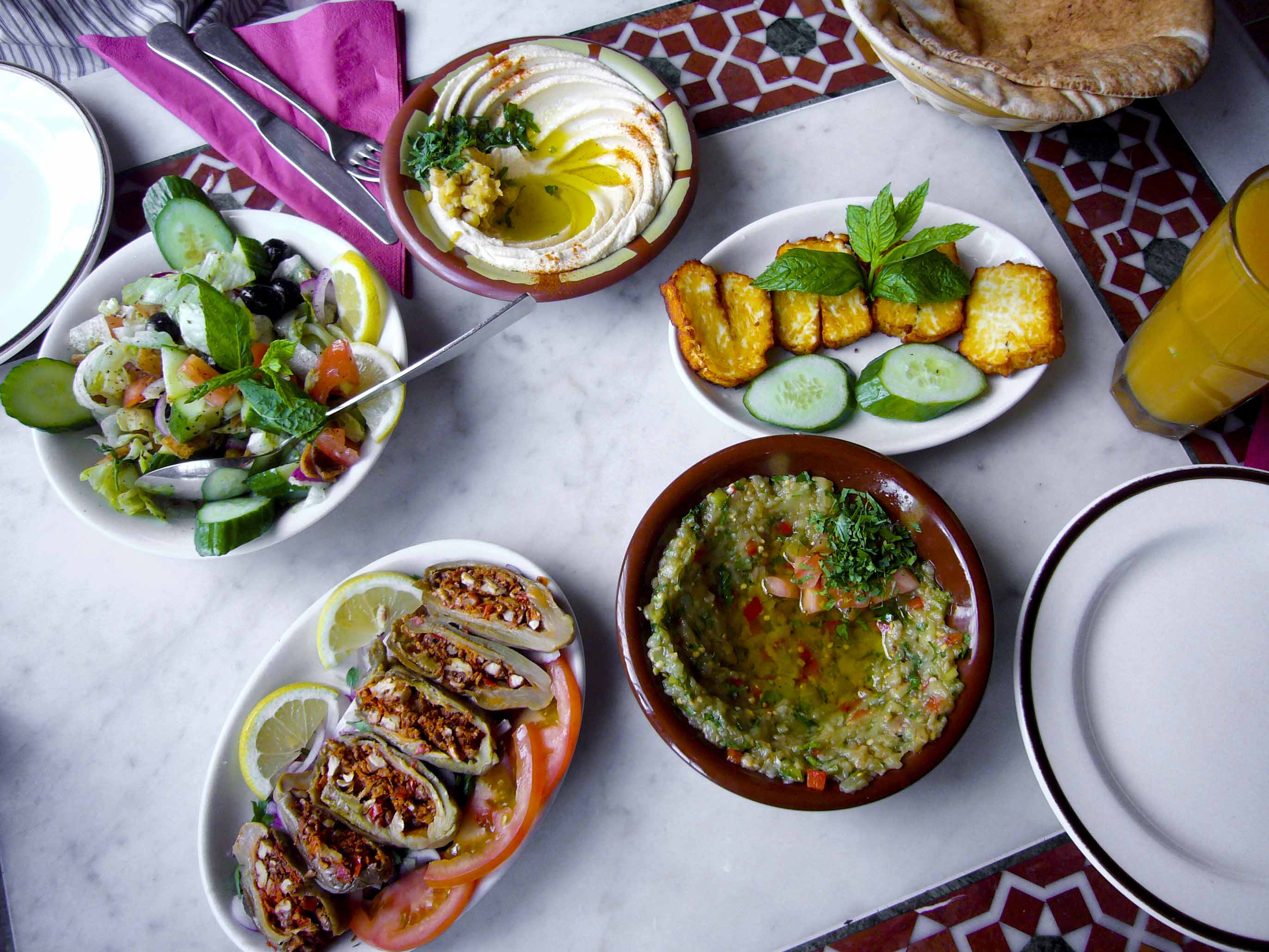
A spread of classic Levantine meze dishes, including, from top, clockwise: hummus, fried haloumi, baba ganouj, makdous and salad

Levantine cuisine is the traditional cuisine of the Levant. The cuisine has similarities with other Eastern Mediterranean cuisines, such as Balkan cuisine, particularly Greek Egyptian cuisine, North African cuisine, and Ottoman cuisine. It is particularly known for its meze spreads of hot and cold dishes, most notably among them Manakish pies, kibbeh, ful medames, hummus, tabbouleh and baba ghanoush, accompanied by bread.

== History ==
The history of Levantine cuisine can be traced back to the early civilizations that flourished in the region, such as the Arameans, Canaanites, Israelites, Phoenicians, Hittites, and Arabians. These ancient cultures developed complex agricultural systems, producing grains, legumes, fruits, and vegetables that would become staples of the Levantine diet. Bread, olive oil, and wine were integral to the cuisine from the very beginning, and remain so today. Each invasion contributed culinary influences to the cuisine, with the most pronounced influence today being Ottoman cuisine.

Many recipes and practices common to Levantine cuisine were recorded in historical cookbooks, like the 13th century Kitab al-Wuslah ila l-habib from Aleppo and Ustadh al-Tabbakhin by 19th century Lebanese author Khalil Khattar Sarkis.

Levantine diets shifted drastically between the 1960s and the 1990s, early studies from that era described them as largely seasonal, plant-based, and low to moderate in animal product consumption, whereas later studies described them as consuming more processed foods, animal products and refined carbohydrates. Such seasonal foods were traditionally preserved using pickling, fermentation, and drying.

== Levantine dishes ==
=== Classic ===
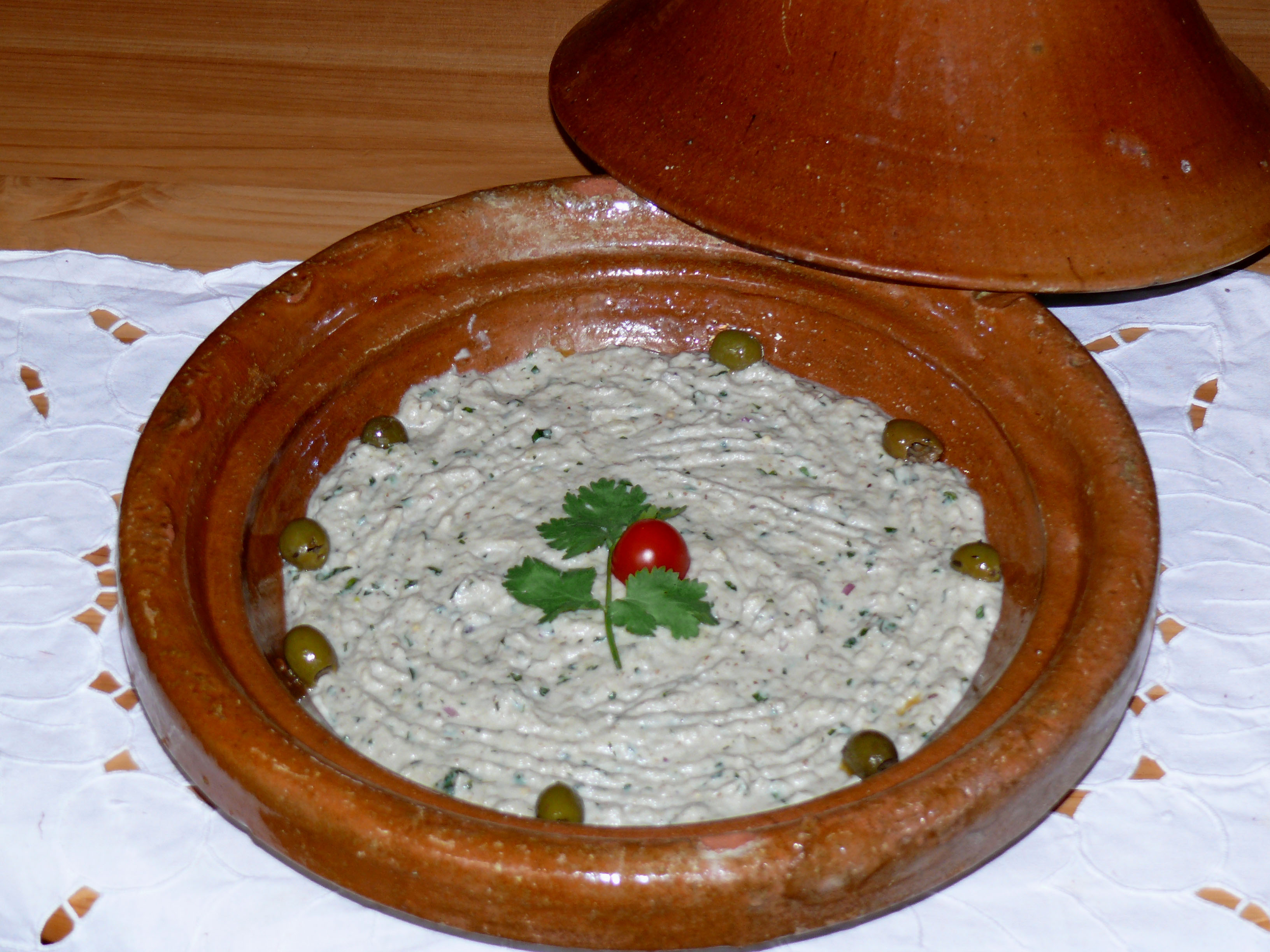
Baba ghanoush

==== Mezes or small dishes ====
- Baba ghanoush (بابا غنوج)—a dip made from baked, mashed eggplant mixed with lemon, garlic, olive oil and various seasonings
- Chickpea salad or salatat hummus (سلطة حمص)—an Arab salad with cooked chickpeas, lemon juice, garlic, tahini, salt, olive oil, and cumin

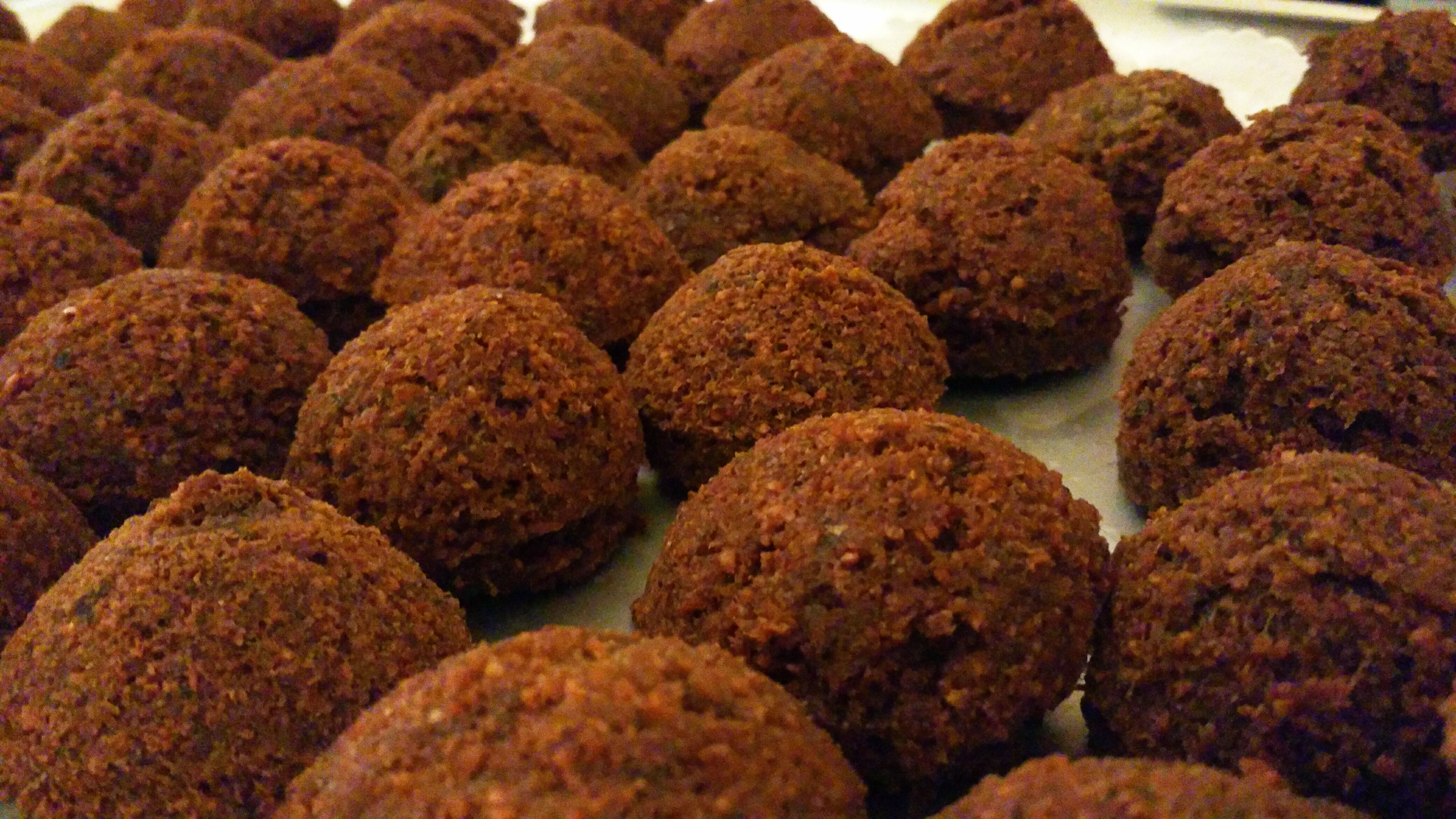
Falafel

- Falafel (فلافل)—spiced mashed chickpeas formed into balls or fritters and deep fried, usually eaten with or in pita bread with hummus

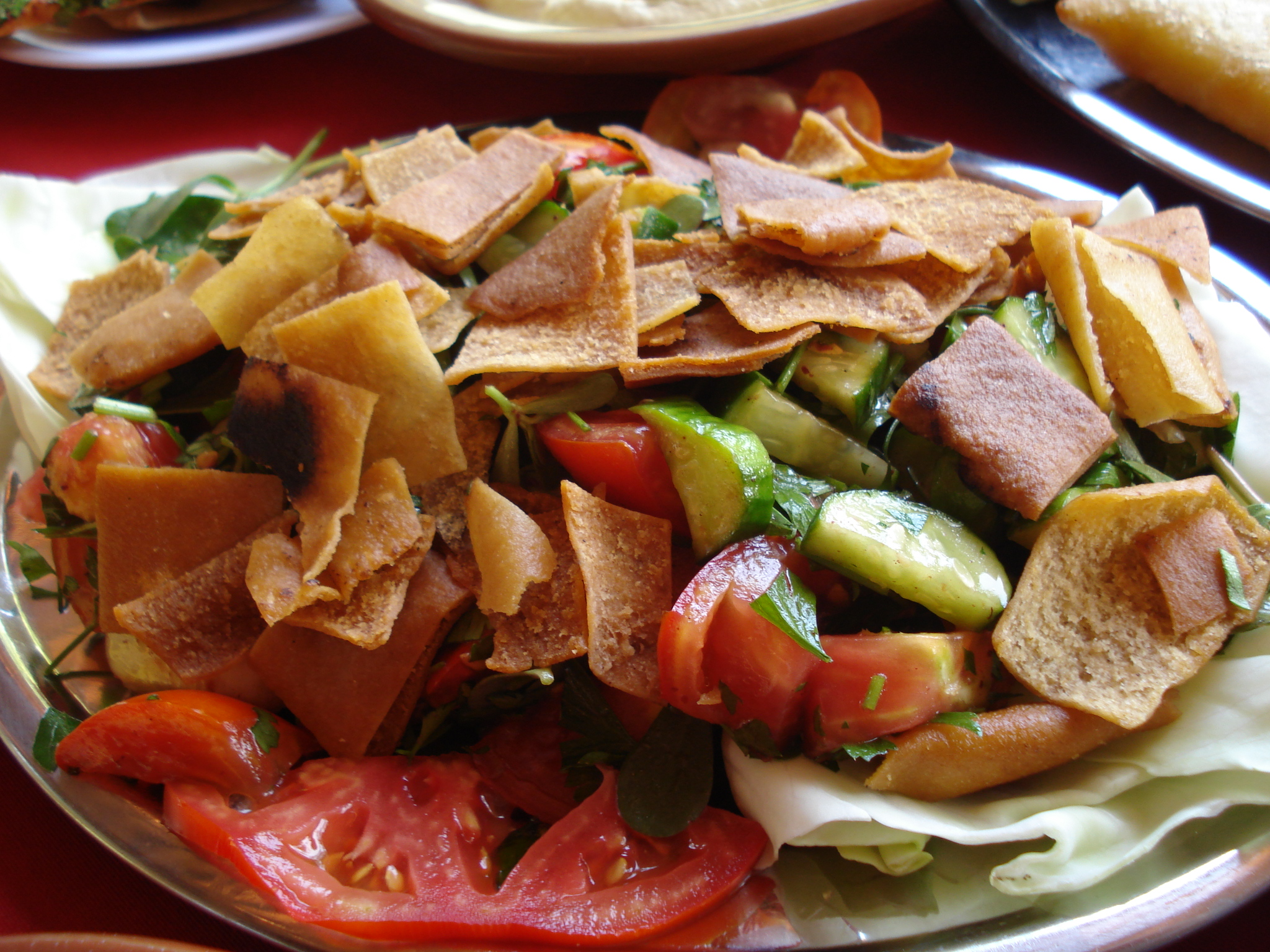
Fattoush is a Levantine pita bread salad that includes mixed greens and other vegetables.

- Fattoush (فتوش)—a salad of chopped cucumber, radish, tomato and other vegetables, with fried or toasted pita bread
- Ful medames (فول مدمس)—ground fava beans and olive oil also prepared in Syria as a salad with fava beans, chopped tomatoes, onion, parsley, lemon juice, olive oil, pepper and salt
- Hummus (حمّص)—a thick paste or spread made from ground chickpeas and olive oil, lemon, and garlic
- Kibbeh (كبة)—a dumpling-like dish of ground lamb with bulgur wheat or rice and seasonings, eaten cooked or raw
- Kibbeh nayyeh (كبة نيئة)—a mezze of minced raw meat mixed with fine bulgur and various seasonings
- Labneh (لبنة)—yogurt that has been strained to remove its whey; most popular as a breakfast food
- Lentil soup (شوربة عدس)—may be vegetarian or include meat, using brown, red, yellow or black lentils, with or without the husk
- Makaneksausage made from ground meat spiced with pine nuts, cumin, cloves, cinnamon and nutmeg and served with pomegranate molasses.

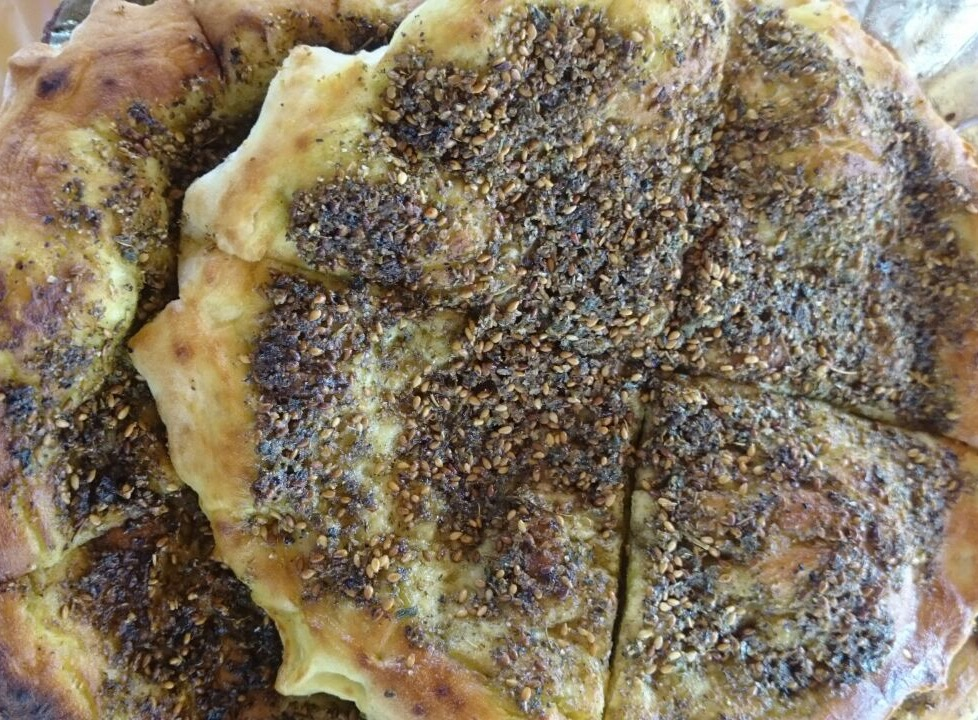
Manakish

- Manakish (مناقيش)—a pizza-like flatbread garnished with minced meat, thyme or za'atar, commonly eaten for breakfast or dinner
- Mfarakeh (مفركة)—an Arab dish made of potato, egg, ghee, cumin powder, salt and pepper, with chopped coriander leaf as garnish
- Muhammara (محمرة)—a hot pepper dip made from fresh or dried peppers, breadcrumbs, olive oil, spices and ground walnuts
- Raheb (سلطة راهب)—a salad with eggplants and tomatoes
- Sambusac (سمبوسك)—a triangular savory pastry fried in ghee or oil with spiced vegetables or meat
- Sfiha (صفيحة)—open-faced meat pies made with ground mutton, lamb or beef
- Shanklish (شنكليش)—cow's or sheep's milk cheese formed into balls, rolled in Aleppo pepper and za'atar, then aged and dried
- Shawarma (شاورما)—roasted meat, cooked on a revolving spit and shaved for serving in sandwiches

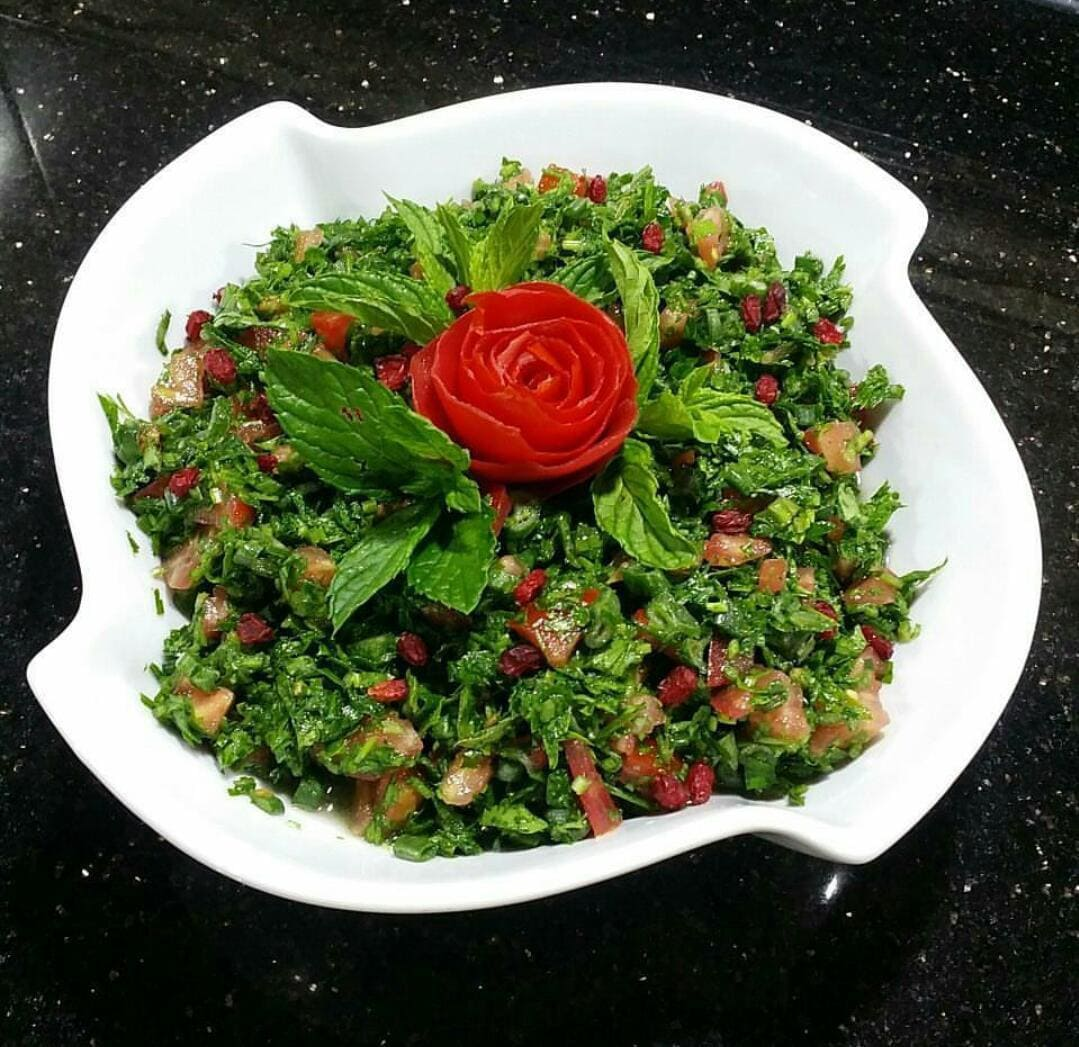
Tabbouleh salad

- Tabbouleh (تبولة)—a salad of bulgur mixed with finely chopped parsley, minced onions and tomatoes

==== Main dishes ====
- Bamia (بامية)—a stew prepared with chunks of lamb meat with okra in a tomato-based sauce, served over rice
- Dolma (محشي)—vegetables, typically eggplants, zucchinis, onions, peppers or tomatoes, stuffed with minced meat and rice
- Fasoulia (فاصوليا)—a stew prepared with white beans and meat served over rice
- Fatteh (فتّة)—chicken over rice, topped with yogurt and pita bread

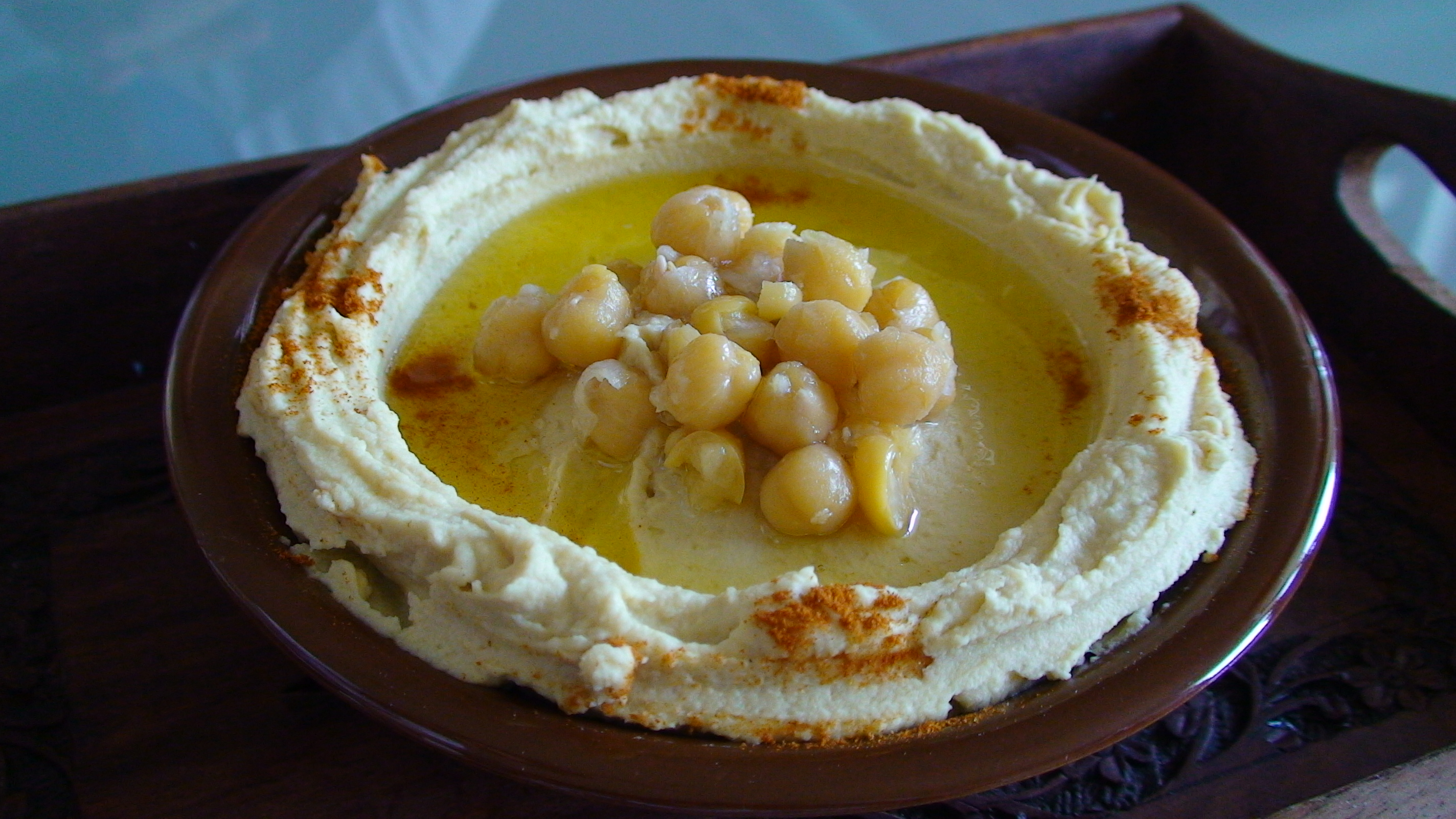
Hummus a thick paste or spread made from ground chickpeas and olive oil

- Freekeh (فريكة)—a cereal food made from green durum wheat that is roasted and rubbed to create its flavour, then served with cumin, cinnamon, and fresh lamb-tail fat
- Harees–Cracked wheat and meat porridge or gruel with seasoning
- Kabsa (كبسة)—a rice-based dish commonly eaten with meat, lamb or chicken, cooked in a variety of spices and topped with nuts over rice and prepared in Syria and Gaza
- Kebab (كباب)—a dish of ground beef or lamb, grilled or roasted on a skewer
- Kebab karaz (كباب كرز)—a type of kebab made of lamb meatballs in a cherry-based broth with pine nuts and sour cherries over pita bread
- Kousa mahshi (كوسا محشي)—zucchinis baked and stuffed with minced meat and rice in a tomato-based sauce
- Malfouf (ملفوف)–rolled cabbage leaves stuffed with rice, meat and spices

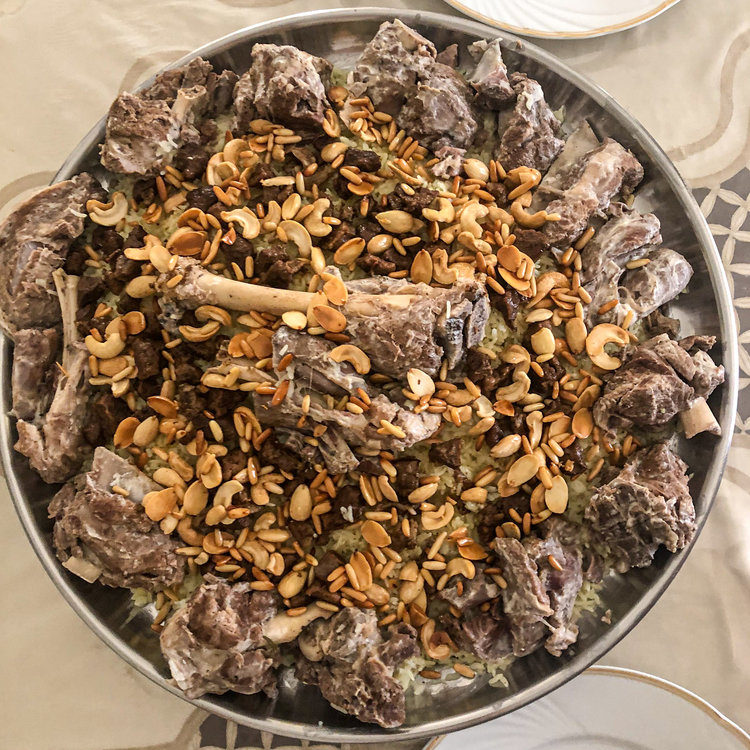
Jordanian lamb mansaf

- Mansaf (منسف)—lamb or chicken cooked in a sauce of fermented dried yogurt and served over rice
- Maqluba (مقلوبة)—a rice-based casserole with meat, rice, and fried vegetables in a pot, which is flipped upside down when served, hence the name, which literally translates as "upside-down"
- Mujaddara (مجدرة)—cooked lentils with groats, generally rice, garnished with sautéed onions
- Mulukhiyah (ملوخية)—a stew cooked with mallow leaves, mucillagenous like okra, eaten with chicken in a thick broth

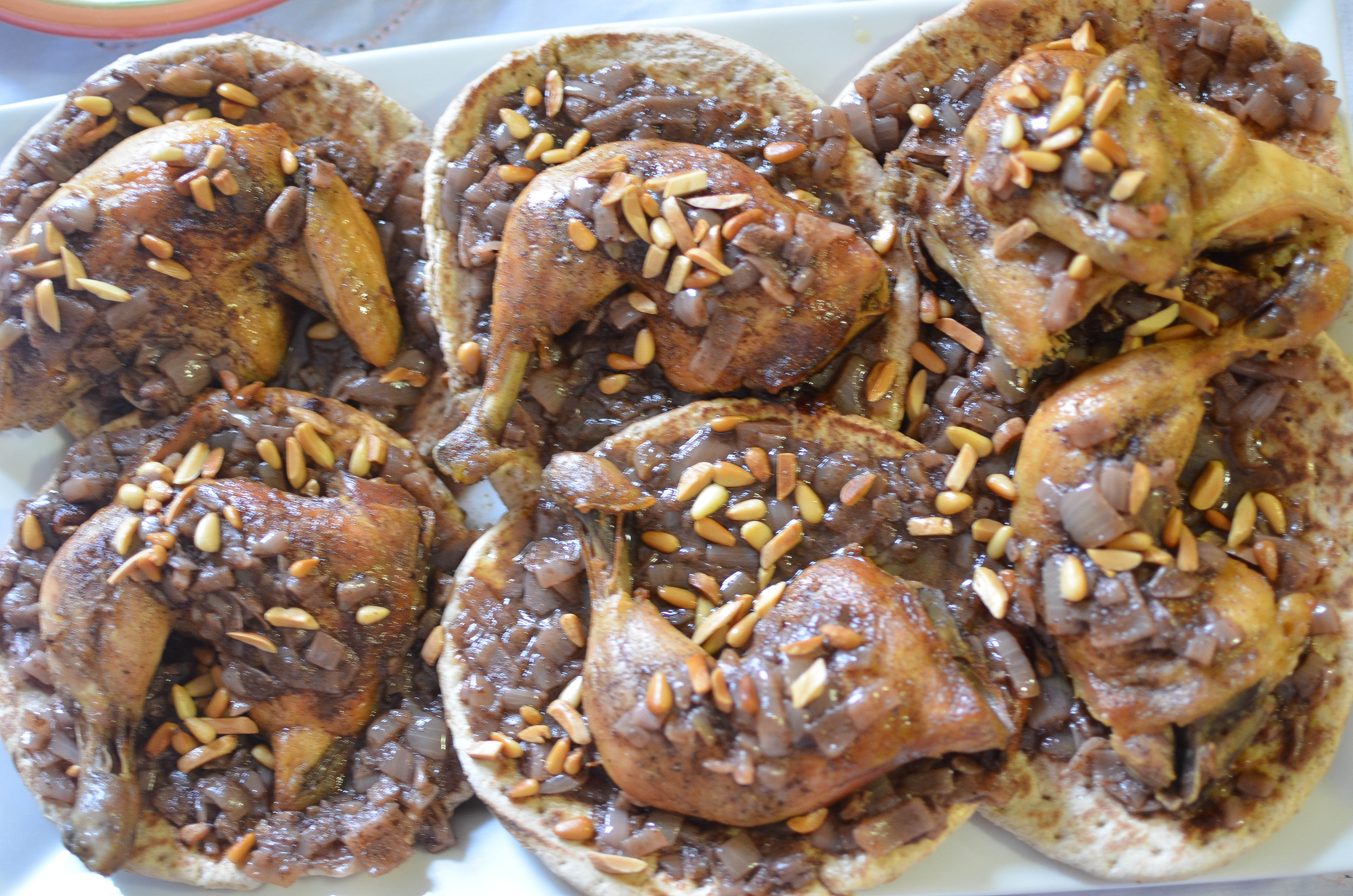
Classic musakhan – roasted chicken on a bed of bread, pine nuts, onions and spices

- Musakhan (مسخّن)—a classic Palestinian dish, a whole roasted chicken baked with onions, sumac, allspice, saffron, and fried pine nuts served over taboon bread
- Qarymutah (القريموطة), a simple way to prepare bulgur in rural areas of Homs, Hama and Salamiyah. Bulgur is cooked with vegetables and wrapped in grape leaves
- Qidreh (قدرة)—a lamb stew with chickpeas, garlic and spices, commonly served over rice
- Quzi (قوزي)—a hearty dish of roasted lamb with raisins, nuts and spices over rice or wrapped in taboon bread
- Shish kebab (شيش كباب)—grilled or roasted chunks of meat on a skewer, commonly served over flatbread or rice
- Sumaghiyyeh (سماقية)—ground sumac is soaked in water then mixed with tahina (sesame-seed paste), water and flour, added to sautéed chopped chard, pieces of slow-stewed beef, and garbanzo beans
- Zibdieh (زبدية)—a clay-pot dish of shrimp baked in a stew of olive oil, garlic, hot peppers, and peeled tomatoes

==== Breads ====
- Ka'ak (كعك)—a type of biscuit/cookie shaped into a ring, occasionally sprinkled with sesame seeds
- Markook (مرقوق)—a thin, unleavened flatbread baked on an iron griddle known as saj
- Pita (خبز عربي)—a soft, slightly leavened flatbread baked from wheat flour

==== Condiments ====
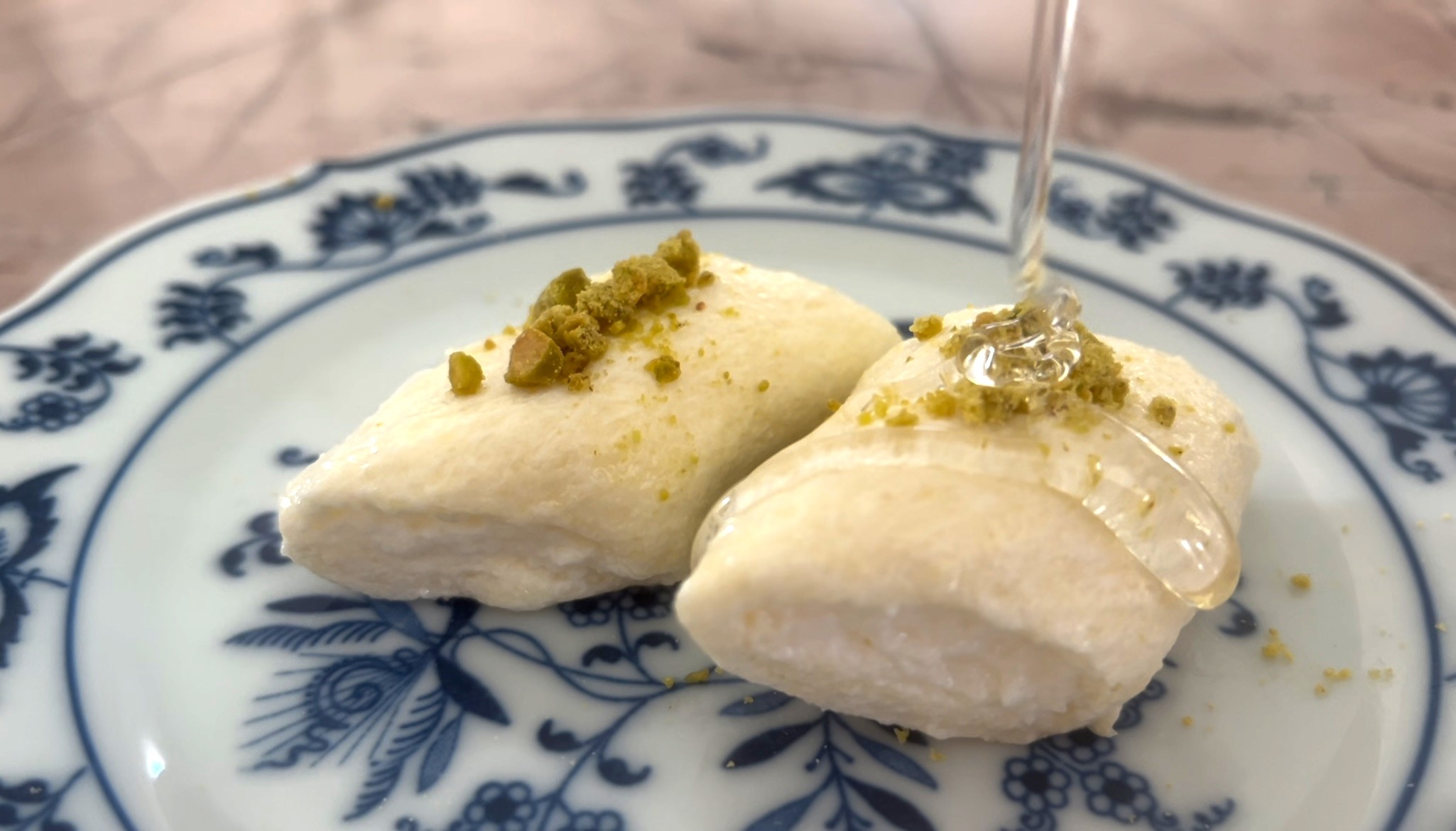
Halawet el Jibn

- Tahini (طحينة)—condiment made of ground and hulled sesame seeds, primary ingredient baba ghanoush and hummus
- Toum (توم)—a paste containing garlic, olive oil and salt, typically used as a dip
- Za'atar (زَعْتَر)—a condiment of dried herbs mixed with sesame seeds, dried sumac, and often salt, as well as other spices

==== Sweets ====
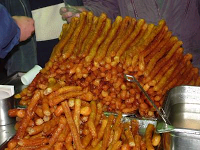
Palestinian karabeej halab.

- Awameh (عوامة)—a fried-dough pastry similar to doughnut holes, made of deep-fried dough soaked in sugar syrup or honey and cinnamon, sometimes sprinkled with sesame seeds
- Basbousa (بسبوسة)—a small, sweet cake of cooked semolina soaked in rose water syrup, topped with almonds or walnuts
- Halawet el Jibn (حلاوة الجبن)—is a dessert made of a semolina and cheese dough, filled with qishta. Its origins are somewhere from central Syria

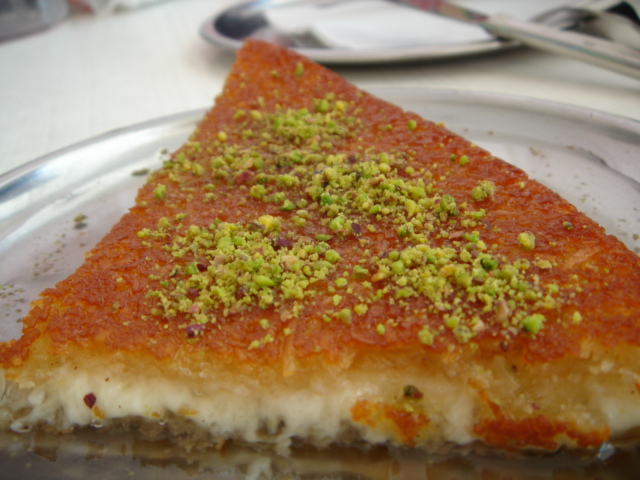
Knafeh or layered sweetened cheese on spun pastry

- Knafeh (كنافة)—a dessert made with shredded filo and melted cheese soaked in a sugary syrup
- Karabeej Halab (Arabic: كرابيج حلب, lit. 'Whips of Aleppo')a churro-like fried dough-based. It is made using semolina flour, and is dipped into a sugar and rose water syrup after it is deep fried. It originates from Syrian cuisine and is also common in Jordan and the West bank, especially during Ramadan
- Ma'amoul (معمول)—semolina shortbread cookies filled with dates or walnuts, commonly sprinkled with sugar
- Meghli (مغلي)–a floured rice pudding spiced with anise, caraway and cinnamon and garnished with coconut flakes and nuts
- Qatayef (قطايف)—a dessert commonly served during the month of Ramadan, a sweet dumpling filled with cream or nuts
- Warbat (وربات)—a sweet pastry with thin layers of phyllo pastry filled with custard, popularly eaten during Ramadan
- Zalabia (زلابية)—a fried dough pastry shaped as balls or discs, often dipped in a sweet syrup

==== Drinks ====
- Limonana (ليمون نعناع)—lemonade made from freshly-squeezed lemon juice and mint leaves
- Qamar al-Din (قمر الدين)—a thick, cold apricot drink typically served during the month of Ramadan

==== Preserved foods ====
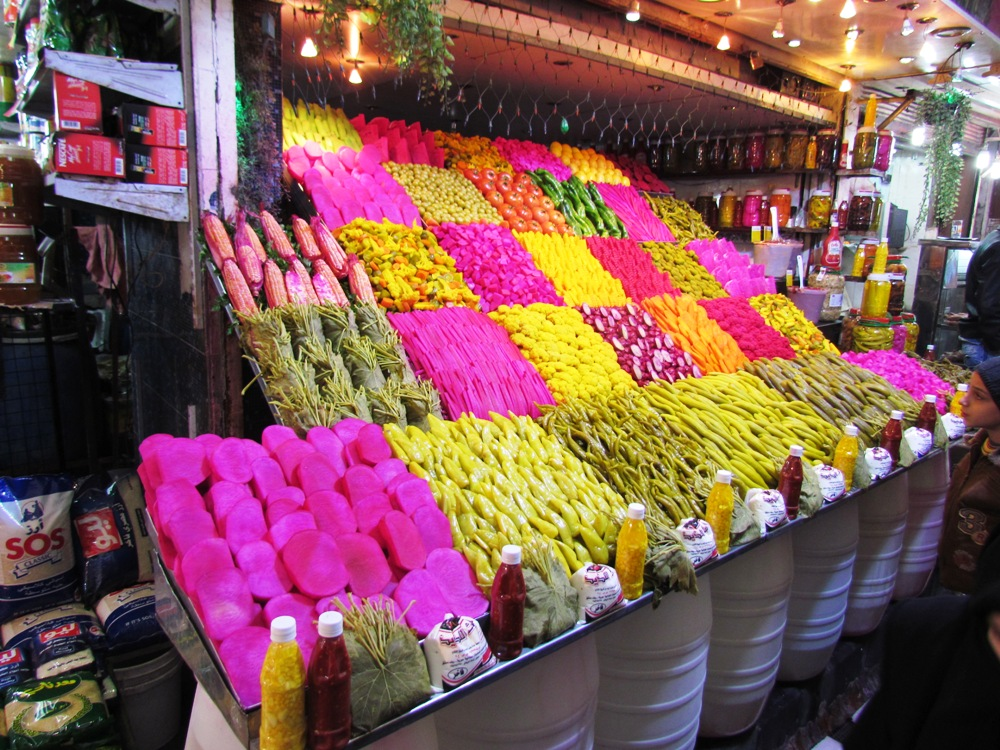
Pickles and preserves on sale in Damascus, Syria

Mouneh (Arabic: مونة) is the practice of preserving seasonal foods for times of scarcity, these include syrups, jams, dried foods, pickles, among others. Brining in salt is traditionally one of the primary preservation methods, meats were traditionally preserved in fat. The Oxford Companion to Food described Syria and Lebanon as having "a strong culture of preserving seasonal foods".

Such foods were traditionally made to ensure food security, but the practice declined with the availability of modern food preservation means, however, the tradition is still practiced by food cooperatives. Spaces exposed to the sun like balconies are used for drying food. Mouneh was used to cope with wars, like the Syrian civil war.

- Jameed (جميد)-dried yogurt
- Makdous (مكدوس)-oil-cured miniature aubergines
- Murabba (مربى)-spiced sweet fruit preserves
- Dibs (دبس)-grape syrup
- Pomegranate molasses (دبس الرمان)-sweet and sour syrup made by boiling pomegranates
- Samneh (سمنة)-spiced clarified butter
- Bastirma (بسطرمة)-preserved spiced meat
- Maqaniq (مقانق)-intestine sausages
- Qawarma (قاورما)-spiced lamb meat preserved in tail fat

=== Contemporary ===
- Malfouf salad (سلطة ملفوف)—a cabbage salad with lemon juice, olive oil, garlic, salt, and mint

== Geographical varieties of Levantine cuisine ==
Lebanese writer Anissa Helou noted that Palestinian, Jordanian, and southern Syrian cuisines are higher in fat and more subdued in flavor compared to other Levantine cuisines.

- Assyrian cuisine
- Cypriot cuisine
- Israeli cuisine
- Jordanian cuisine
- Lebanese cuisine
- Ottoman cuisine
- Palestinian cuisine
- Syrian cuisine

== See also ==
- Arab cuisine
- Greek cuisine
- Jewish cuisine
- Iranian cuisine
- Politics of food in the Arab–Israeli conflict

== Bibliography ==
- Wright, Clifford A. (2003). Little foods of the Mediterranean: 500 fabulous recipes for antipasti, tapas, hors d'oeuvre, meze, and more (Illustrated ed.). Harvard Common Press. ISBN 1-55832-227-2.
