= Panellets =

Catalan pastry

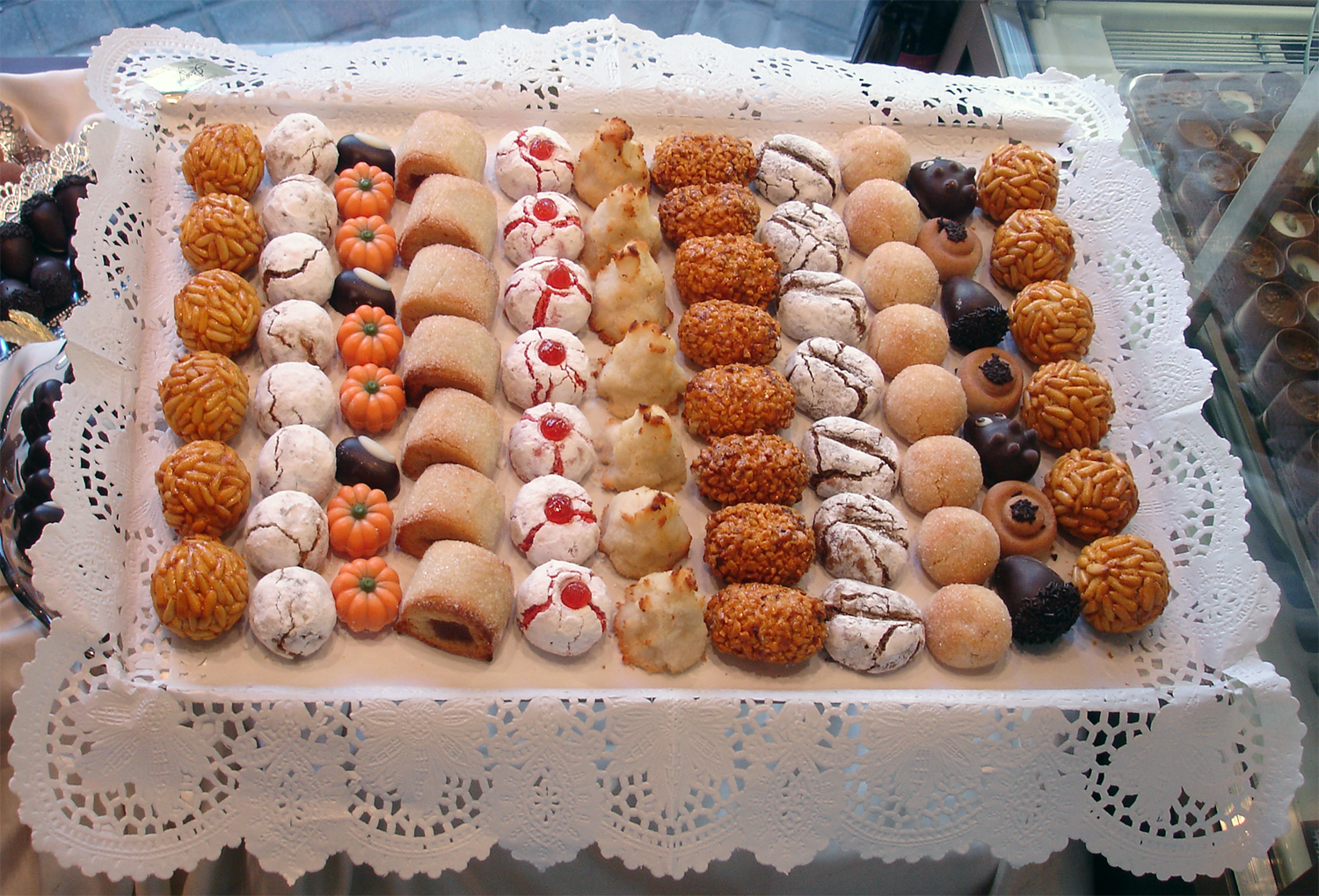
- Type: Pastry
- Place of origin: Spain
- Region or state: Catalonia
- Main ingredients: Marzipan, pine nuts

Panellets (Catalan pronunciation: [pənəˈʎɛts], singular: panellet; Catalan for "little bread") are the traditional dessert of the All Saints' Day, known as Castanyada, in Catalonia, Andorra, Ibiza and the Valencian Community, with chestnuts and sweet potatoes. Panellets are often accompanied with a dessert wine, usually moscatell, mistela, vi de missa or vi ranci. Panellets are small cakes or cookies in different shapes, mostly round, made mainly of marzipan (a paste made of almonds and sugar). The most popular are the panellets covered with pine nuts, consisting of the panellet basis (marzipan) rolled in pine nuts and varnished with egg. In Seville, in southern Spain, these cookies are known as empiñonados.

Panellets date at least from the 18th century, when they were used as blessed food to share after some religious celebrations (Panellets de Sant Marc and Panellets de la Santa Creu)."

Within the EU and UK, panellets have Traditional Speciality Guaranteed status.

== See also ==
- Pignoli (cookie)
