= Hummus (disambiguation) =

Hummus is a Middle Eastern food.

Hummus may also refer to:

- Hummus the Movie, or Hummus! The Movie, a 2015 documentary
- Hummus (Muslimgauze album), 2001 work by Bryn Jones
- Hummus salad
- Homs

== See also ==
- Abu Hummus, a town in Beheira Governorate, Egypt
- Hamas, the de facto governing authority of the Gaza Strip
