= List of Arab salads =

Arab cuisine

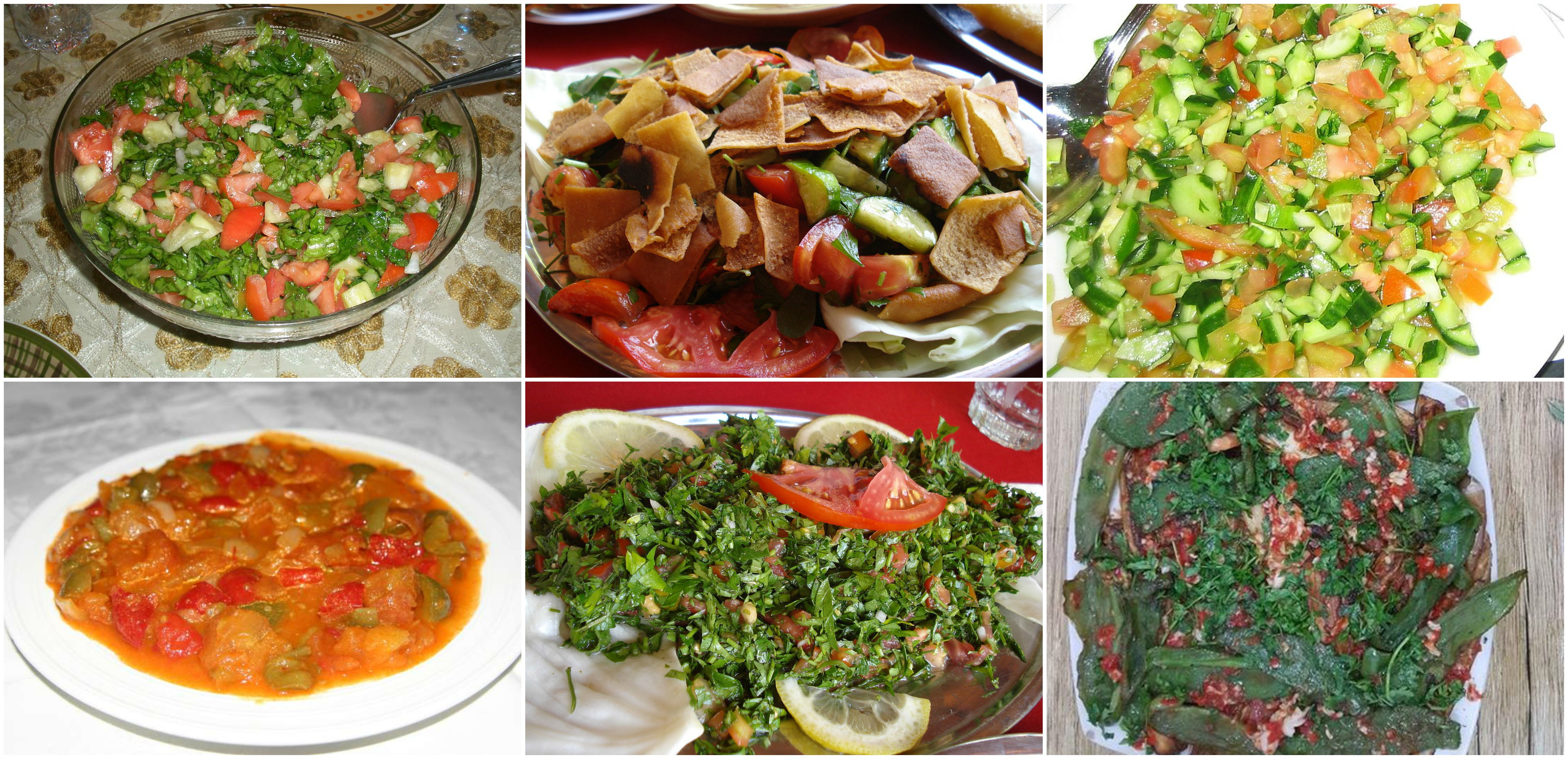
Varieties of Arabic salad: Arab salad, Fattoush, Palestinian salad, Tabbouleh and Raheb.

In Arab cuisine salads are often served as a first course. A variety of salads are brought to the table on small plates, as in mezze.

Tabbouleh, a salad of finely chopped parsley, with tomatoes, mint, onion, and soaked bulgur, is one of the most popular Arab salads. Mixed vegetable salads, and salads of cooked eggplant or chick peas are common. Green salad, known as the "Salata Khadra", consists of cucumbers, tomatoes, a bundle of fresh parsley, salt and pepper and the juice of one lemon.

Pita and other flat breads are commonly served alongside salads.

== Varieties of Arab salad ==
Name	Image	Region	Description
Arab salad		Arab world	Combines many different vegetables and spices, and often served as part of a mezze
Baba ghanoush		Levant	Also eggplant salad is a dish of cooked eggplant mixed with tahina, olive oil and various seasonings.
Cucumber and yogurt salad		Arab world	Is made of salted strained yogurt (usually from sheep or goat milk) or diluted yogurt
Fattoush		Levant	A bread salad made from toasted or fried pieces of pita bread (khubz 'arabi) combined with mixed greens and other vegetables.
Ful medames salad		Levant	Made of beans, chopped tomatoes, onion, parsley, lemon juice, olive oil, pepper and salt.
Hummus salad		Levant	Is made of dry chickpea, soda carbonate, lemon juice, garlic, tahini, salt, olive oil, and cumin.
Malfouf salad		Levant	Is made of cabbage, lemon juice, olive oil, garlic, salt and much fresh or dried mint.
Mechouia salad		Tunisia	Tunisian salad of grilled vegetables: tomatoes, peppers, onions and garlic
Qrymutah		Central Syria	Bulgur, onion, parsley, cucumber, lemon juice, olive oil. Served with grape leaves.
Raheb		Levant	Made with eggplant (aubergine) and tomatoes.
Rubiyan salad		Arab world	Is made of shrimp, tomato. mayonnaise, lettuce leaves, ketchup, hot sauce, mustard, lemon juice, and salt.
Shepherd salad		Levant	Chopped salad of finely diced tomato and cucumber. Usually made of tomatoes, cucumbers, onions and parsley, and dressed with fresh lemon juice, olive oil and black pepper. Generally, the cucumbers are not peeled. The key is using very fresh vegetables and chopping them as finely as possible.
Shʿifurah		Coastal Syria	Shanklish cheese with chopped tomato and onion and olive oil.
Tabbouleh		Levant	Finely chopped parsley, bulgur, mint, tomato, scallion, and other herbs with lemon juice, olive oil and various seasonings, generally including black pepper and sometimes cinnamon and allspice.
Wheat salad		Arab world	Is made of wheat, corn, tomatoes, carrots, cucumber pickles, lemon, parsley, olive oil and salt.

== See also ==
- Arab cuisine
- List of salads
