= Pine nut =

Edible seeds of certain species of pines

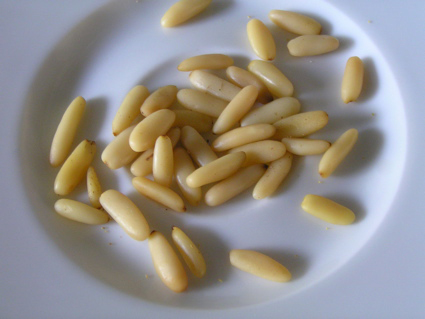
Shelled European pine (Pinus pinea) nuts

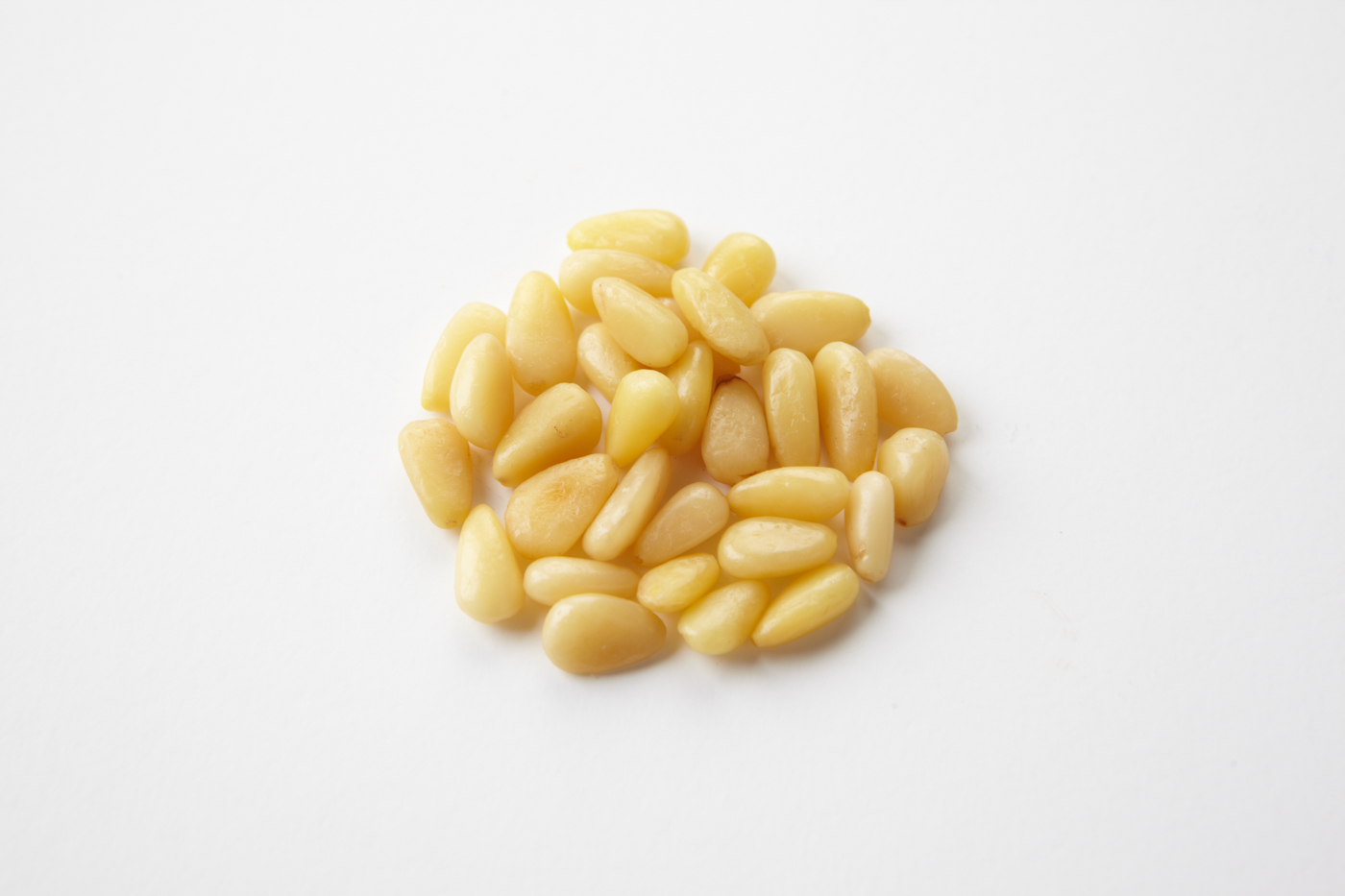
Shelled Korean pine (Pinus koraiensis) nuts

Pine nuts, also called piñón (Spanish: [piˈɲon]), pinoli (Italian: [piˈnɔːli]), or pignoli, are the edible seeds of pines (family Pinaceae, genus Pinus). According to the Food and Agriculture Organization, only 29 species provide edible nuts, while 20 are traded locally or internationally owing to their seed size being large enough to be worth harvesting; in other pines, the seeds are also edible but are too small to be of notable value as human food. The biggest exporters of pine nuts are China, Russia, North Korea, and Pakistan.

As pines are gymnosperms, not angiosperms (flowering plants), pine nuts are not "true nuts"; they are not botanical fruits, the seed not being enclosed in an ovary which develops into the fruit, but simply bare seeds—"gymnosperm" meaning literally "naked seed" (from Ancient Greek: γυμνός, romanized: gymnos, lit. 'naked' and σπέρμα, sperma, 'seed'). The similarity of pine nuts to some angiosperm fruits is an example of convergent evolution.

== Species and geographic spread ==
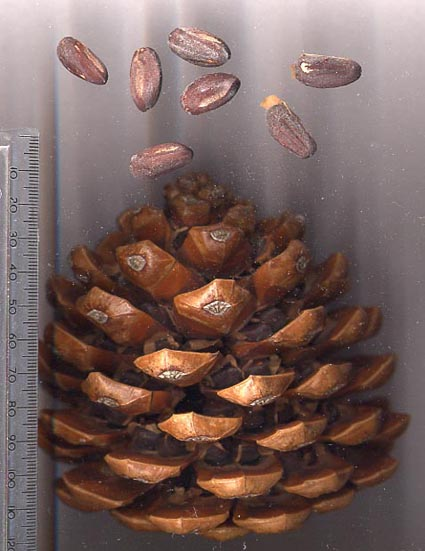
Stone pine – note two nuts under each cone scale

In Asia, two species, in particular, are widely harvested: Chilgoza pine (P. gerardiana) in the western Himalayas and Korean pine (Pinus koraiensis) in northeast Asia, which is the most important species in international trade. Four other species, Siberian pine (P. sibirica), Siberian dwarf pine (P. pumila), Chinese white pine (P. armandii) and lacebark pine (P. bungeana), are also used to a lesser extent. Russia is the largest producer of P. sibirica nuts in the world, followed by either Mongolia or Afghanistan. They each produce over 10,000 metric tons (9,800 long tons; 11,000 short tons) annually, most of it exported to China.

Pine nuts produced in Europe mostly come from the stone pine (P. pinea), which has been cultivated for its nuts for over 5,000 years. Pine nuts have been harvested from wild trees for far longer. The Swiss pine (P. cembra) is also used, to a very small extent.

In North America, the main species are three of the pinyon pines: Colorado pinyon (P. edulis), single-leaf pinyon (P. monophylla), and Mexican pinyon (P. cembroides). The other eight pinyon species are used to a small extent, as are gray pine (P. sabineana), Coulter pine (P. coulteri), Torrey pine (P. torreyana), sugar pine (P. lambertiana) and Parry pinyon (P. quadrifolia). Here, the nuts themselves are known by the Spanish name for the pinyon pine, piñón (plural: piñones).

In the United States, pine nuts are mainly harvested by Native American and Hispano communities, particularly in the Western United States and Southwestern United States, by the Shoshone, Paiute, Navajo, Pueblo, Hopi, Washoe, and Hispanos of New Mexico. Certain treaties negotiated by tribes and laws in Nevada guarantee Native Americans' right to harvest pine nuts, and the state of New Mexico protects the use of the word piñon for use with pine nuts from certain species of indigenous New Mexican pines.

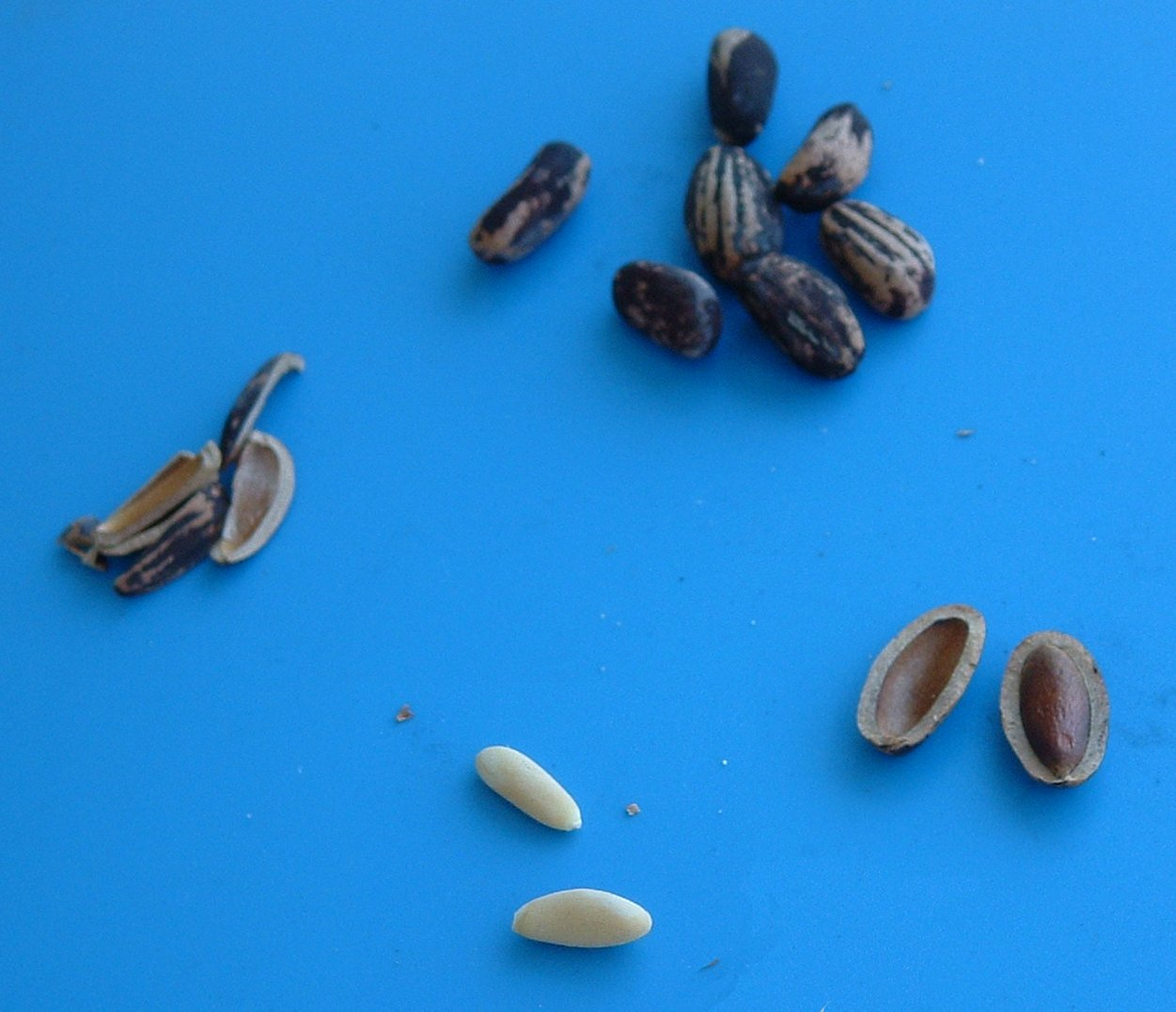
Stone pine (Pinus pinea) nuts

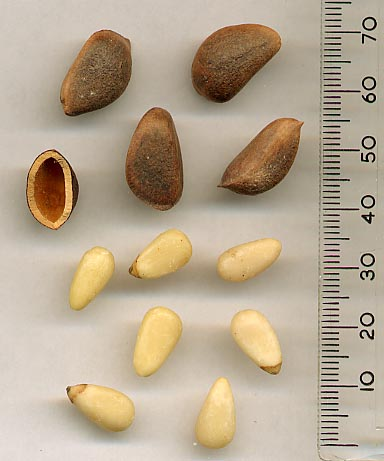
Korean pine (Pinus koraiensis) nuts – unshelled, and shell, above; shelled, below

== Pollination and seed development ==
Pine nuts will not reach full maturity unless the environmental conditions are favorable for the tree and the cone. The time to maturity varies depending on the species.

For some American species, development begins in early spring with pollination. A tiny cone, about the size of a small marble, will form from mid-spring through the end of summer; this immature cone will temporarily cease growing and remain dormant until the following spring, then grow again until it reaches maturity near the end of its second summer. The mature piñon pine cone is ready to harvest ten days before the green cone begins to open. A cone is harvested by placing it in a burlap bag and exposing it to a heat source such as the sun to begin drying. It takes about 20 days until the cone fully opens. Once it is fully open and dry, the seed can be easily extracted in various ways. The most common and practical extraction method used is the repeated striking of the burlap bag containing the cone(s) against a rough surface to cause the cone(s) to shatter, leaving just the job of separating by hand the seed from the residue within the bag.

Another option for harvesting is to wait until the cone opens on the tree (as it naturally will) and harvest the cone from the piñon pine, followed by the extracting process mentioned above. Fallen seeds can also be gathered beneath the trees.

== Ecology and status ==
Because pine nuts are an important food source for many animals, overharvesting of pine nuts threatens local ecosystems, an effect occurring during the early 21st century with increased culinary uses for pine nuts. In the United States, millions of hectares of productive pinyon pine woods have been destroyed due to conversion of lands, and in China and Russia, destructive harvesting techniques (such as breaking off whole branches to harvest the cones) and removal of trees for timber have led to losses in production capacity.

=== Elevation and pinecone production ===
Some growers claim that the elevation of the pinyon pine is an important determinant of the quantity of pine cone production and, therefore, will largely determine the number of pine nuts the tree will yield. The US Department of Agriculture notes that variation in cone production between trees growing on identical sites is often observed.

American pinyon pine cone production is most commonly found at an elevation between 1,800 and 2,600 m (6,000 and 8,500 ft), and ideally at 2,100 m (7,000 ft). This is due to higher temperatures at elevations lower than 1,800 m (6,000 ft) during the spring, which dry up humidity and moisture content (particularly snow packs) that provide for the tree throughout the spring and summer, causing little nourishment for pine cone maturity.

Although several other environmental factors determine the conditions of the ecosystem (such as clouds and rain), the trees tend to abort cones without sufficient water. High humidity encourages cone development. There are certain topographical areas found in lower elevations, such as shaded canyons, where the humidity remains constant throughout the spring and summer, allowing pine cones to fully mature and produce seed.

At elevations above 2,600 m (8,500 ft), the temperature substantially drops, drastically affecting the state of the dormant cone. During the winter, frequent dramatic changes in temperature, drying, and gusty winds make the cones susceptible to freeze-drying that permanently damages them; in this case, growth is stunted, and the seeds deteriorate.

== Physical characteristics ==
When first extracted from the pine cone, they are covered with a hard shell (seed coat), thin in some species and thick in others. The nutrition is stored in the embryo (sporophyte) in the center. Although a nut in the culinary sense, in the botanical sense, pine nuts are seeds; being a gymnosperm, they lack a carpel (fruit) outside.

The shell must be removed before the pine nut can be eaten. Unshelled pine nuts have a long shelf life if kept dry and refrigerated (−5 to 2 °C or 23 to 36 °F); shelled nuts (and unshelled nuts in warm conditions) deteriorate rapidly, becoming rancid within a few weeks or even days in warm, humid conditions. Pine nuts are commercially available in the shelled form, but due to poor storage, they can have poor flavor and may already be rancid at the time of purchase. Consequently, pine nuts are often frozen to preserve their flavor.

European pine nuts may be distinguished from Asian ones by their greater length than girth; Asian pine nuts are stubbier, shaped somewhat like long kernels of corn. The American piñon nuts are known for their large size and ease of shelling. In the United States, Pinus edulis, the hard shell of New Mexico and Colorado, became a sought-after species due to the trading post system and the Navajo people who used the nuts as a means of commerce. The Italian pine nut (P. pinea) was brought to the United States by immigrants and became a favored treat along the East Coast in the early 1930s, when bumper crops of American pine nuts were readily available at low prices.

== Nutrition ==
Nuts, pine nuts, shelled, dried
Nutritional value per 100 g (3.5 oz)
- Energy: 2,815 kJ (673 kcal)
- Carbohydrates: 13.1 g
- Starch: 5.81 g
- Sugars: 3.6 g
- Dietary fiber: 3.7 g
- Fat: 68.4 g
- Saturated: 4.9 g
- Monounsaturated: 18.7 g
- Polyunsaturated: 34.1 g
- Protein: 13.7 g
Vitamins and minerals
Vitamins	Quantity %DV^{†}
Vitamin A equiv. beta-Carotene	0% 1 μg 0% 17 μg
Thiamine (B1)	33% 0.4 mg
Riboflavin (B2)	15% 0.2 mg
Niacin (B3)	28% 4.4 mg
Pantothenic acid (B5)	6% 0.3 mg
Vitamin B6	6% 0.1 mg
Folate (B9)	9% 34 μg
Choline	10% 55.8 mg
Vitamin C	1% 0.8 mg
Vitamin E	62% 9.3 mg
Vitamin K	45% 53.9 μg
Minerals	Quantity %DV^{†}
Calcium	1% 16 mg
Copper	144% 1.3 mg
Iron	31% 5.5 mg
Magnesium	60% 251 mg
Manganese	383% 8.8 mg
Phosphorus	46% 575 mg
Potassium	20% 597 mg
Selenium	1% 0.7 μg
Zinc	58% 6.4 mg
- Other constituents: Quantity
- Water: 2.3 g
- Link to USDA Database entry
- ^{†}Percentages estimated using US recommendations for adults, except for potassium, which is estimated based on expert recommendation from the National Academies.

When dried for eating, pine nuts are 2% water, 13% carbohydrates, 14% protein, and 68% fat (table). In a 100-gram (3 1/2-ounce) reference serving, dried pine nuts supply 2,815 kilojoules (673 kilocalories) of food energy and are a rich source (20% or more of the Daily Value, DV) of numerous dietary minerals, particularly manganese, copper, magnesium, and zinc, with substantial amounts of vitamin E, vitamin K, and the B vitamins, thiamin and niacin (table).

== Culinary uses ==
Pine nuts have been eaten in Europe and Asia since the Paleolithic period. They are frequently added to meat, fish, salads, and vegetable dishes or baked into bread.

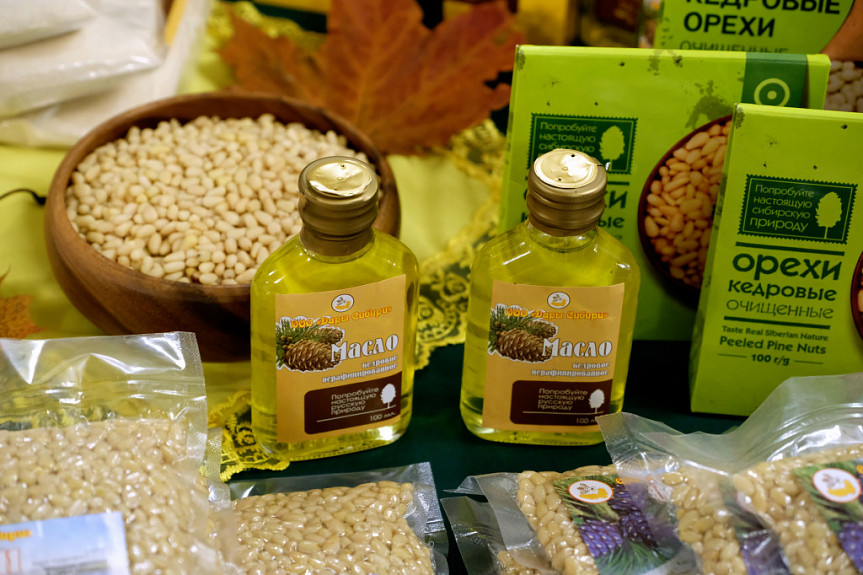
Shelled nuts and vials of cedar oil. Buryatia, Russia

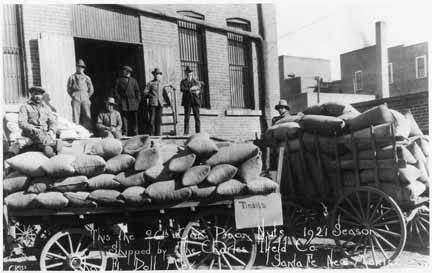
Pinon nuts (Pinus edulis) packed for shipment, Santa Fe, New Mexico, 1921

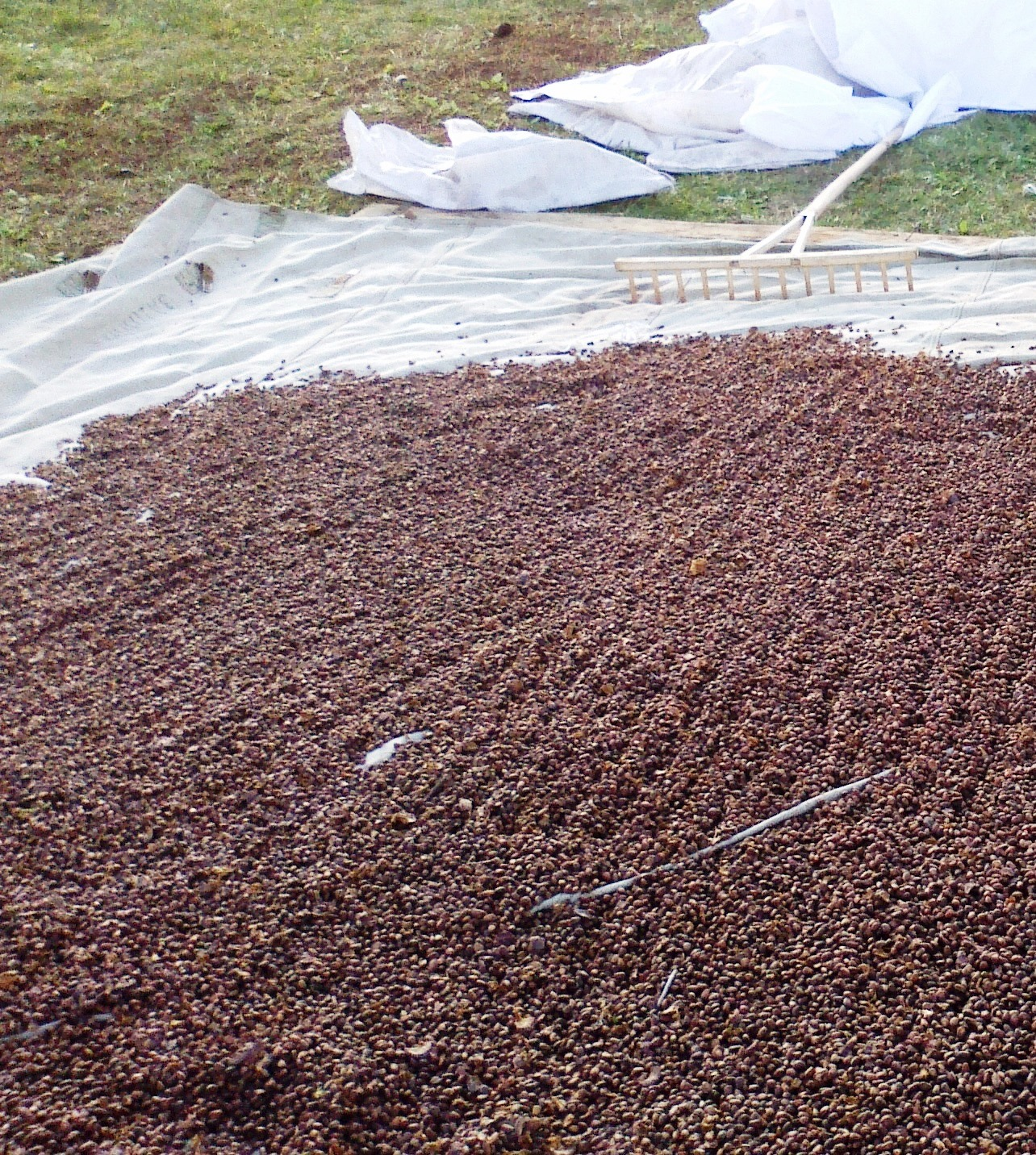
Drying of pine nuts (Siberia)

In Italian, they are called pinoli (in the US, they are often called pignoli, but in Italy, pignolo is actually a word far more commonly used to describe a fussy, overly fastidious or extremely meticulous person) and are an essential component of Italian pesto sauce; the upsurge in the popularity of this sauce since the 1990s has increased the visibility of the nut in America, primarily on the West Coast. Torta della nonna (literally "granny's cake") is a generic Italian dish name that in most families indicates an old family recipe for any cake but often is used for a tart or a pie filled with custard, topped with pine nuts and optionally dusted with icing sugar. Pignoli cookies, an Italian American specialty confection (in Italy, these would be called biscotti ai pinoli), are made of almond flour formed into a dough similar to that of a macaroon and then topped with pine nuts.

In the Catalan-speaking regions of Spain, a sweet called panellets is made of small marzipan balls covered with pine nuts, painted with egg, and lightly cooked. Pine nuts are also featured in the salade landaise of southwestern France. Nevada, or Great Basin, pine nut has a sweet fruity flavor and is promoted for its large size, sweet flavor, and ease of peeling.

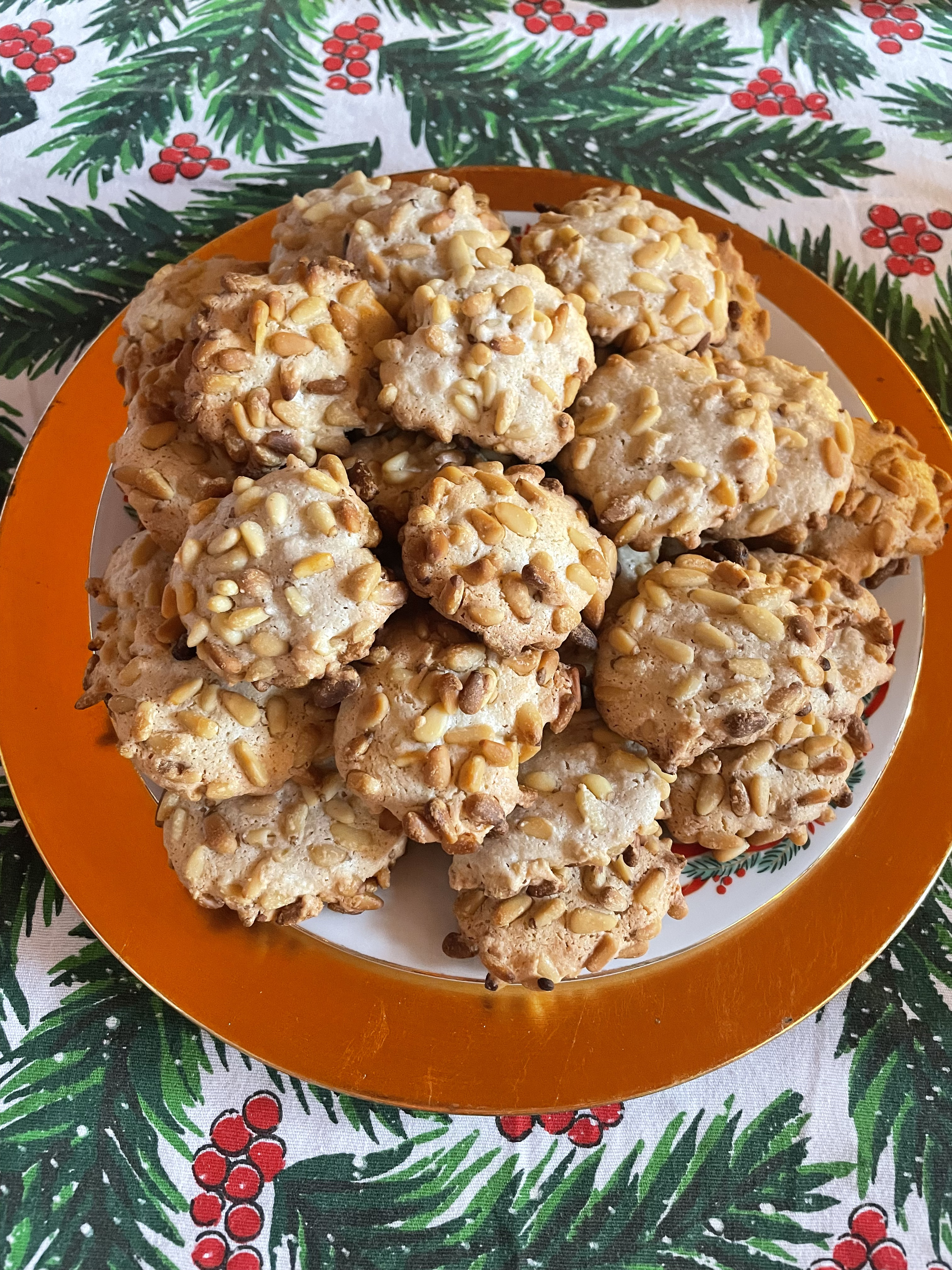
Christmas Italian pinioli cookies from Charleston, South Carolina

Pine nuts are also widely used in Levantine cuisine, reflected in a diverse range of dishes such as kibbeh, sambusak, fatayer, and Maqluba, desserts such as baklava, meghli, and many others.

Throughout Europe, the Levant, and West Asia, the pine nuts used are traditionally from Pinus pinea (stone pine). They are easily distinguished from the Asian pine nuts by their more slender shape and more homogeneous flesh. Because of the lower price, Asian pine nuts are also often used, especially in cheaper preparations.

Pine nut oil is added to foods for flavor.

=== Taste disturbances ===
Some raw pine nuts can cause pine mouth syndrome, a taste disturbance lasting from a few days to a few weeks after consumption. A bitter, metallic, unpleasant taste is reported. There are no known lasting effects, with the United States Food and Drug Administration reporting that there are "no apparent adverse clinical side effects". Raw nuts from Pinus armandii, mainly in China, may be the cause of the problem. Metallic taste disturbance is typically reported 1–3 days after ingestion, being worse on day two and typically lasting up to two weeks. Cases are self-limited and resolve without treatment.

=== Food fraud ===
In the United States, from 2008 to 2012, some people reported a bitter metallic taste ("pine mouth") that sometimes lasted for weeks after they ate pine nuts. After an international investigation, the FDA found that some manufacturers substituted a non-food species of pine nuts in place of more expensive edible pine nut species as a form of food fraud.

== Other uses ==
Some Native American tribes use the hard outer shell of the pine nut as a bead for decorative purposes in traditional regalia and jewelry. In the Great Basin area of the US, collecting pine nuts is a protected right through state law and treaty.

In northern California, pine nuts are collected from the grey pine or bull pine. Tribes burn designs into the hard shell, reflecting the same design they use in baskets; however, they are often left blank or burned to blacken. These are more often used in women's regalia and jewelry.

== See also ==
- Assidat Zgougou – a Tunisian dessert made of pine nuts
- Jatjuk – a Korean porridge prepared using pine nuts
- List of edible seeds
