= Wheat salad =

Arab salad

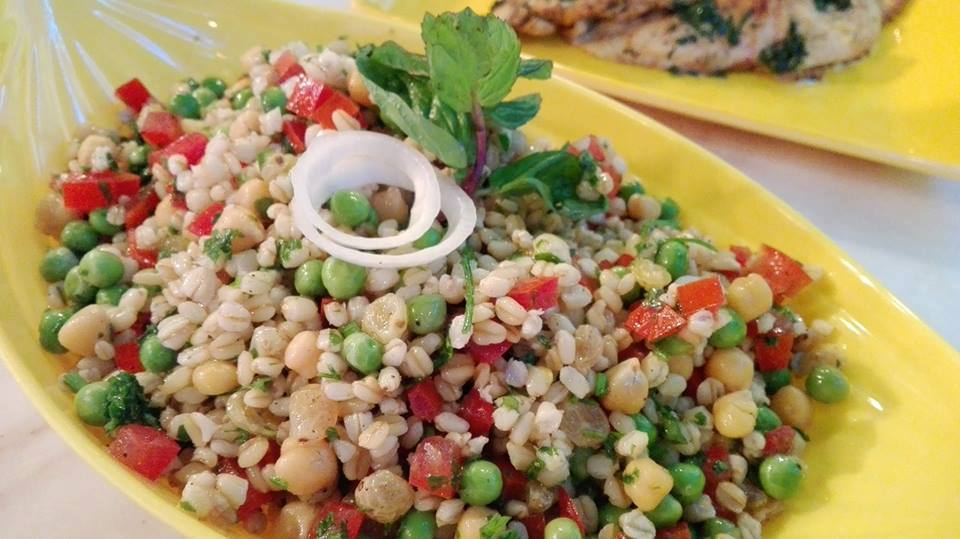
- Type: Salad
- Region or state: Arab world

Wheat salad (Arabic: سلطة قمح), is an Arab salad which typically consists of wheat, corn, tomatoes, carrots, pickled cucumber lemon, parsley, olive oil and salt.

== See also ==
- List of Arab salads
- List of salads
