= Meghli =

Levantine rice pudding

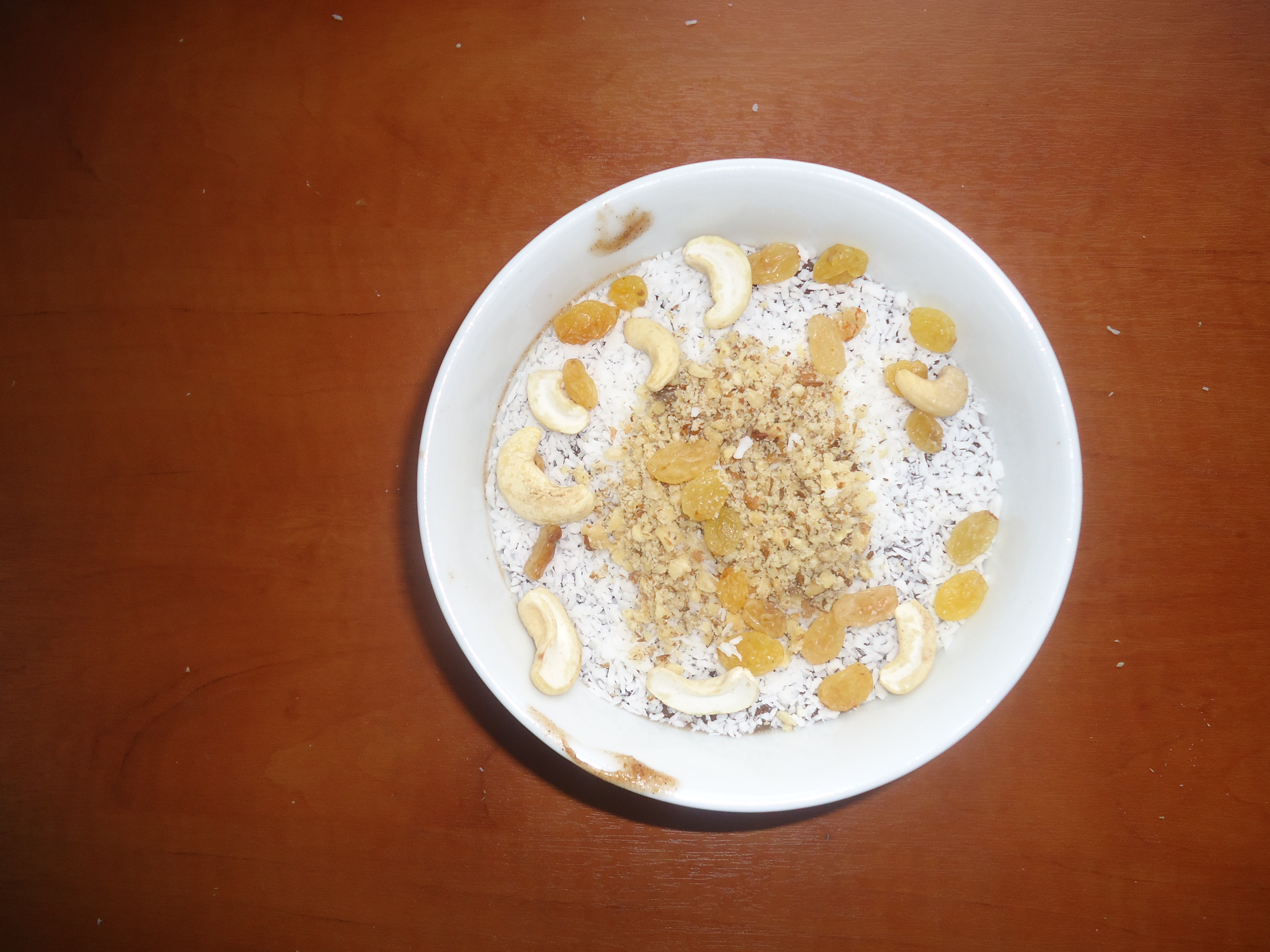
- Alternative names: Moghli, Meghleh, Karawiya
- Course: Dessert
- Region or state: Levant
- Serving temperature: Cold or warm
- Main ingredients: Rice flour, sugar, anise, caraway, cinnamon, coconut, almonds, pistachios, pine nuts, walnuts

Meghli, moghli, meghleh, (Arabic: مغلي), or karawiyah, is a Levantine dessert based on a floured rice pudding and spiced with anise, caraway, and cinnamon. The dish is often garnished with dried coconut flakes and various nuts including almonds, walnuts, pine nuts, and pistachios. Meghli is commonly served to celebrate the birth of a child. It is also a popular Christmas dessert in Lebanon as a celebration of the birth of Jesus.

== Name ==
The name 'meghli' means “boiled” in Arabic, referring to the long time (up to an hour) it must be continuously stirred while boiling.

== Celebrations ==
The dish was traditionally served to celebrate the birth of a male heir, but has now become a dessert to celebrate any newborn. The caraway is thought to assist the new mother in lactating.

Meghli is a popular Christmas dessert in Lebanon and among Christians communities throughout the Levant. Meghli is also symbolic of fertile soil, which is brown like the Meghli.

In Lebanon and Palestine, it is often served cold. In Syria and Jordan, it is commonly called karawiya (the Arabic name for caraway) and more commonly served warm.

== See also ==
- Ashure
