= Rubiyan salad =

Type of Arab salad

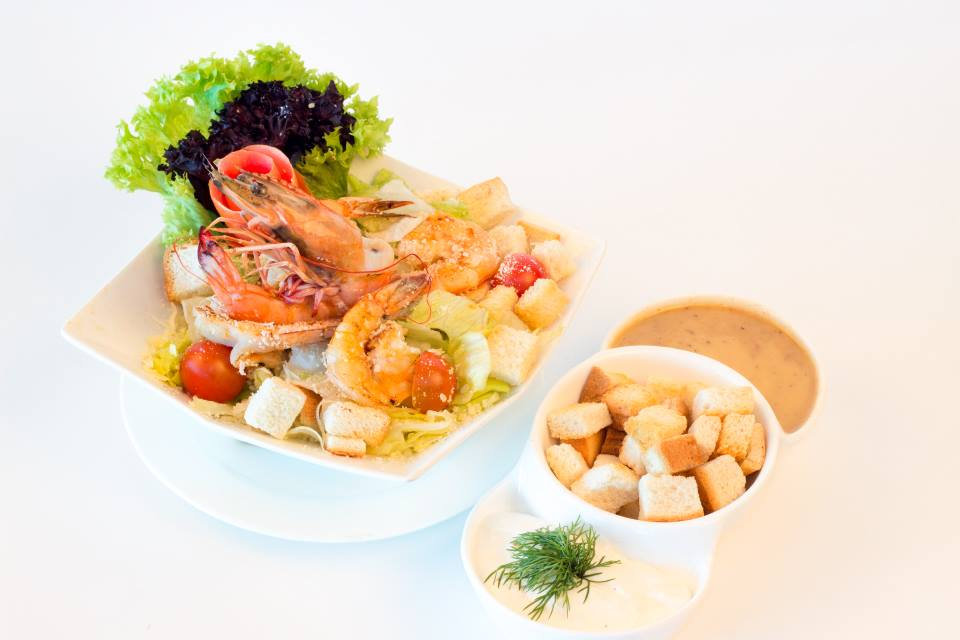
- Alternative names: سلطة الروبيان
- Type: Salad
- Region or state: Arab world

Rubiyan salad (Arabic: سلطة الروبيان or jambariyy salad Arabic: سلطة الجمبري meaning shrimp salad), is a type of Arab salad, typically made of shrimp, tomato. mayonnaise, lettuce leaves, ketchup, hot sauce, mustard, lemon juice, and salt.

== See also ==
- List of Arab salads
