= Malfouf salad =

Lebanese cabbage salad

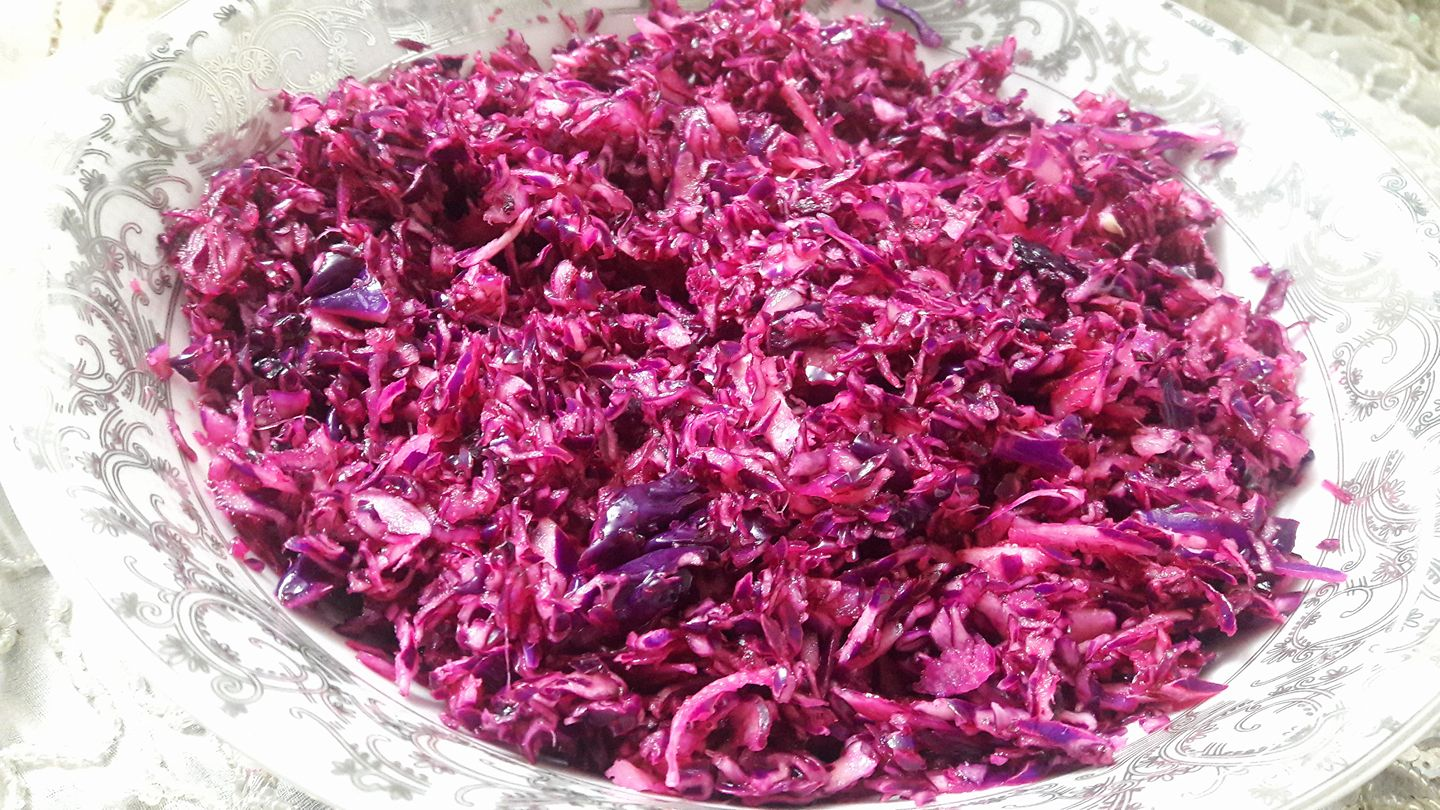
- Alternative names: Cabbage salad
- Type: Salad
- Course: side, appetizer
- Place of origin: Levant
- Region or state: East Mediterranean
- Main ingredients: Cabbage
- Food energy (per serving): one serving has 58 calories

Malfouf salad or cabbage salad (Arabic: سلطة ملفوف), is a Levantine salad, typically consisting of shredded cabbage, lemon juice, olive oil, garlic, salt and dried mint.

== See also ==
- List of Arabic salads
