= Makanek =

Type of sausage

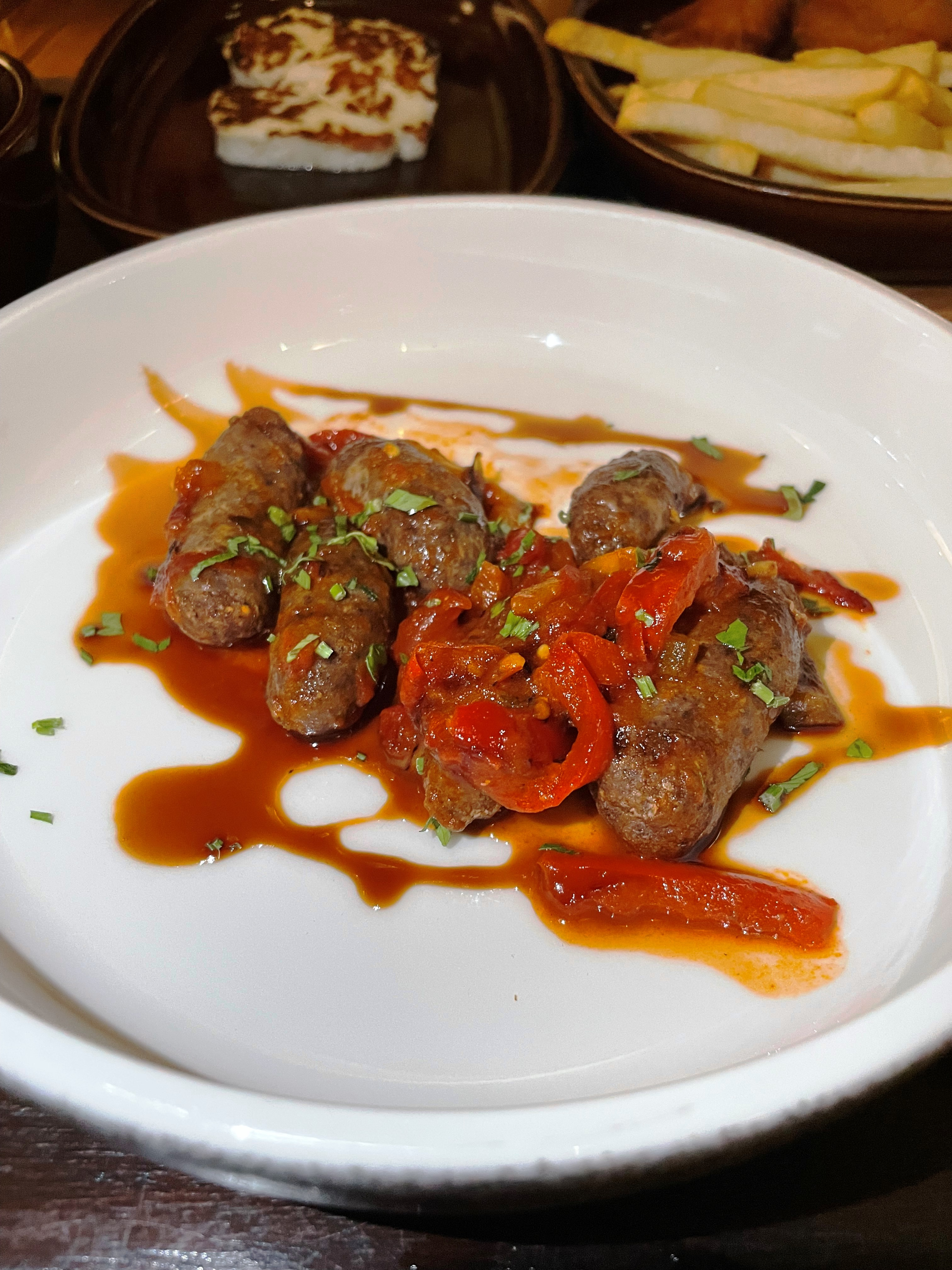
- Lebanese Makanek
- Alternative names: Na'anik
- Type: Sausage
- Place of origin: Levant
- Main ingredients: Lamb, beef

Makanek (Arabic: مَقَانِق, romanized: maqāniq or مُقَانِق, muqāniq), also known as Nakanik (نَقَانِق, naqāniq), is a type of Levantine sausage. It is made from a combination of spiced ground meat (traditionally lamb and beef) filled into a sheep casing. The casing is then fried to create a crispy sausage. The dish can be spiced with pine nuts, cumin, cloves, cinnamon, nutmeg, vinegar, and may be cooked with wine. Traditionally, Makanek is served with pomegranate molasses. Makanek often consumed as meze or sandwiches, typically alongside pickles. Makanek are especially popular in Lebanon; Makanek made by Lebanese Christians may include pork and wine in their makanek, whereas Muslims usually do not.

== History ==
The 10th-century cookbook Kitab al-Tabikh by Abbasid author Ibn Sayyar al-Warraq contained an entire chapter dedicated to recipes for laqāniq (لقانق), which are described as sausages made with small intestines.

== Etymology ==
The word nakanik (نقانق) is ultimately borrowed through Aramaic from the Latin lucanica. The word is often translated into English as "sausage", despite it being seen as distinct.

== See also ==
- Merguez – Algerian seasoned sausage
