= Pinolate (cookie) =

Italian cookies covered in pine nuts

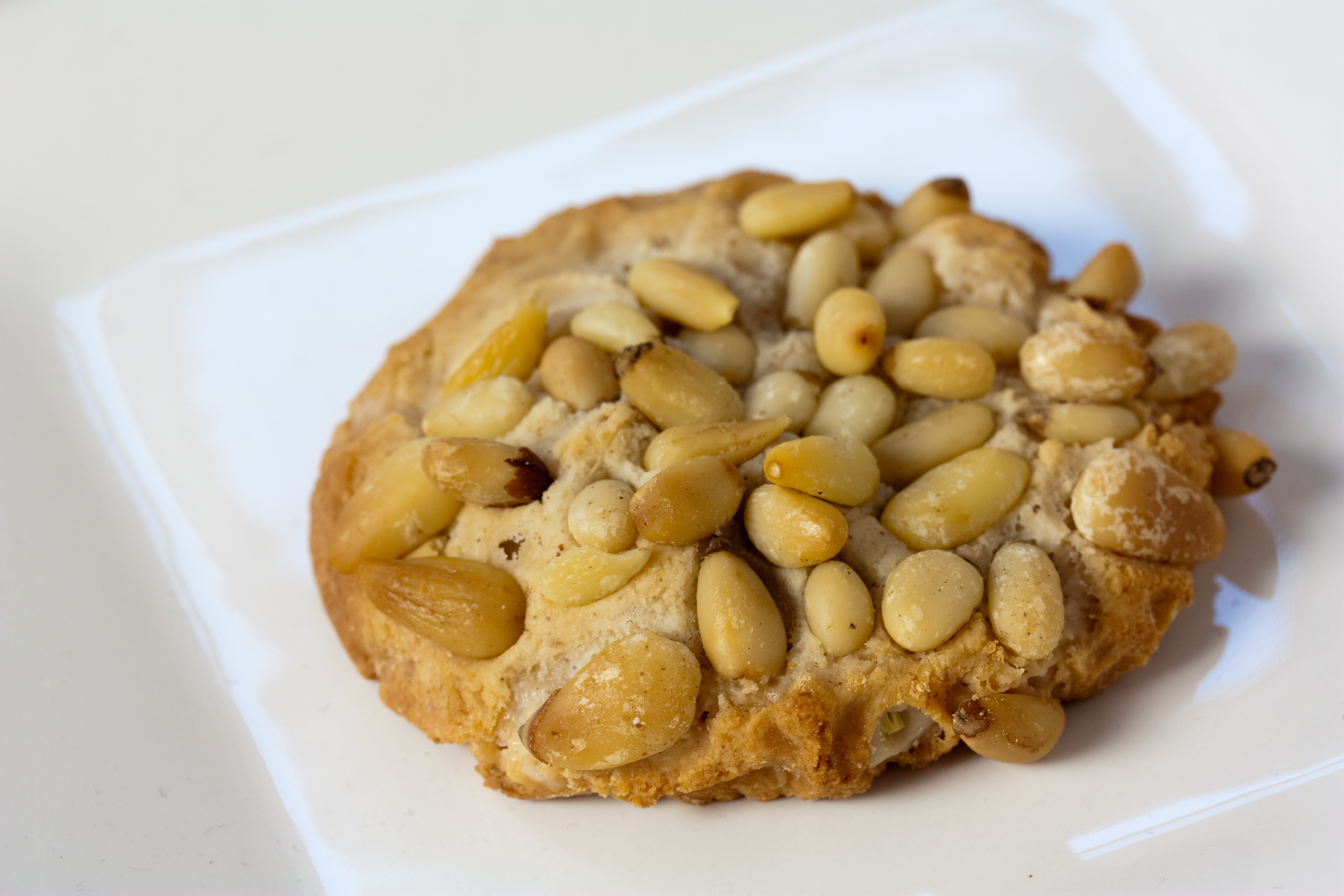
- Type: Macaroon
- Place of origin: Italy
- Region or state: Campania; Liguria; Umbria
- Main ingredients: Almond paste, pine nuts

Pinolate (pl.: Italian: [pinoˈlaːte]) or pignolate (Italian: [piɲɲoˈlaːte], sg.: pinolata / pignolata) are a type of cookie originating in Neapolitan, Genovese and Umbrian cuisine. They are popular in all of southern Italy, and in Sicilian communities in the United States, where they may also be known as pignoli (sg.: pignolo).

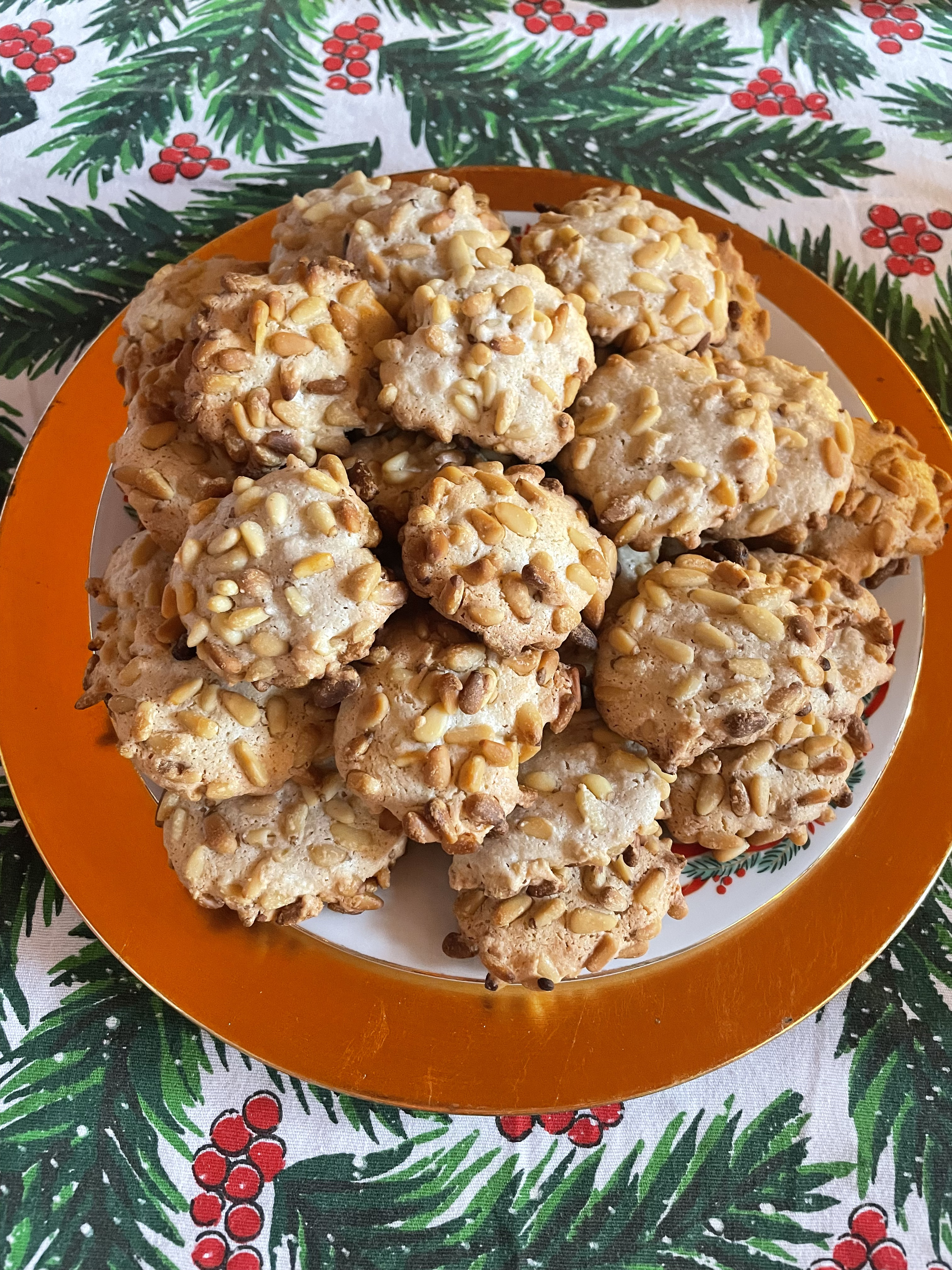
Christmas pignoli cookies from Charleston, South Carolina

The cookies are light golden color and studded with golden pine nuts (pinoli in Italian). Made with almond paste and egg whites, they are moist, soft and chewy.

Pinolate are a popular Italian holiday treat, especially at Christmas. Because both almond paste and pine nuts are relatively expensive and these cookies use substantial amounts of both, it is a luxury food.

Being essentially an almond macaroon, pinolate belong to a type known as "amaretto".

== See also ==
Media related to Panellets at Wikimedia Commons

- Pignolata
- List of Italian desserts and pastries
- List of almond dishes
