= Qarymutah =

Syrian vegetarian dish

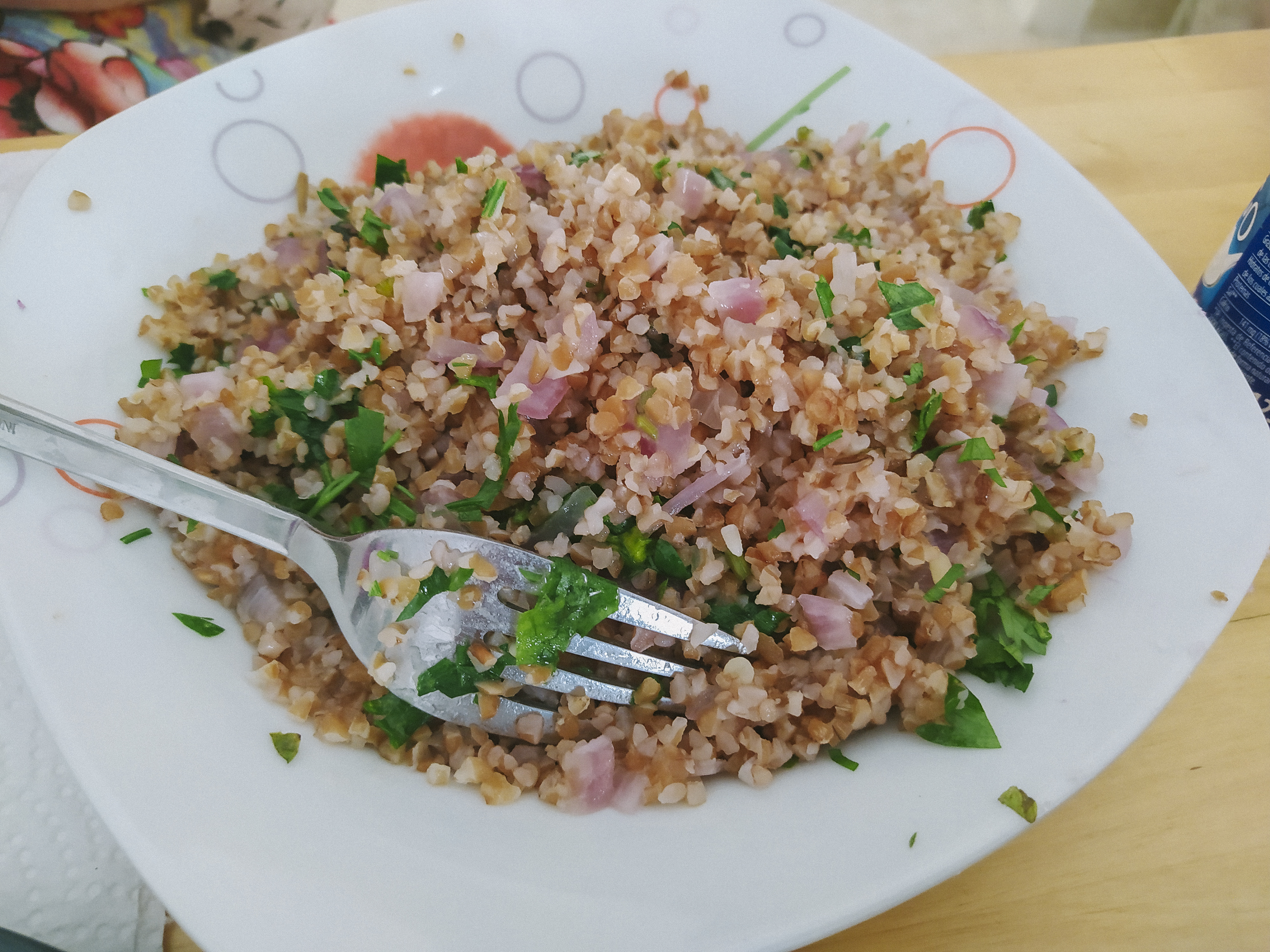
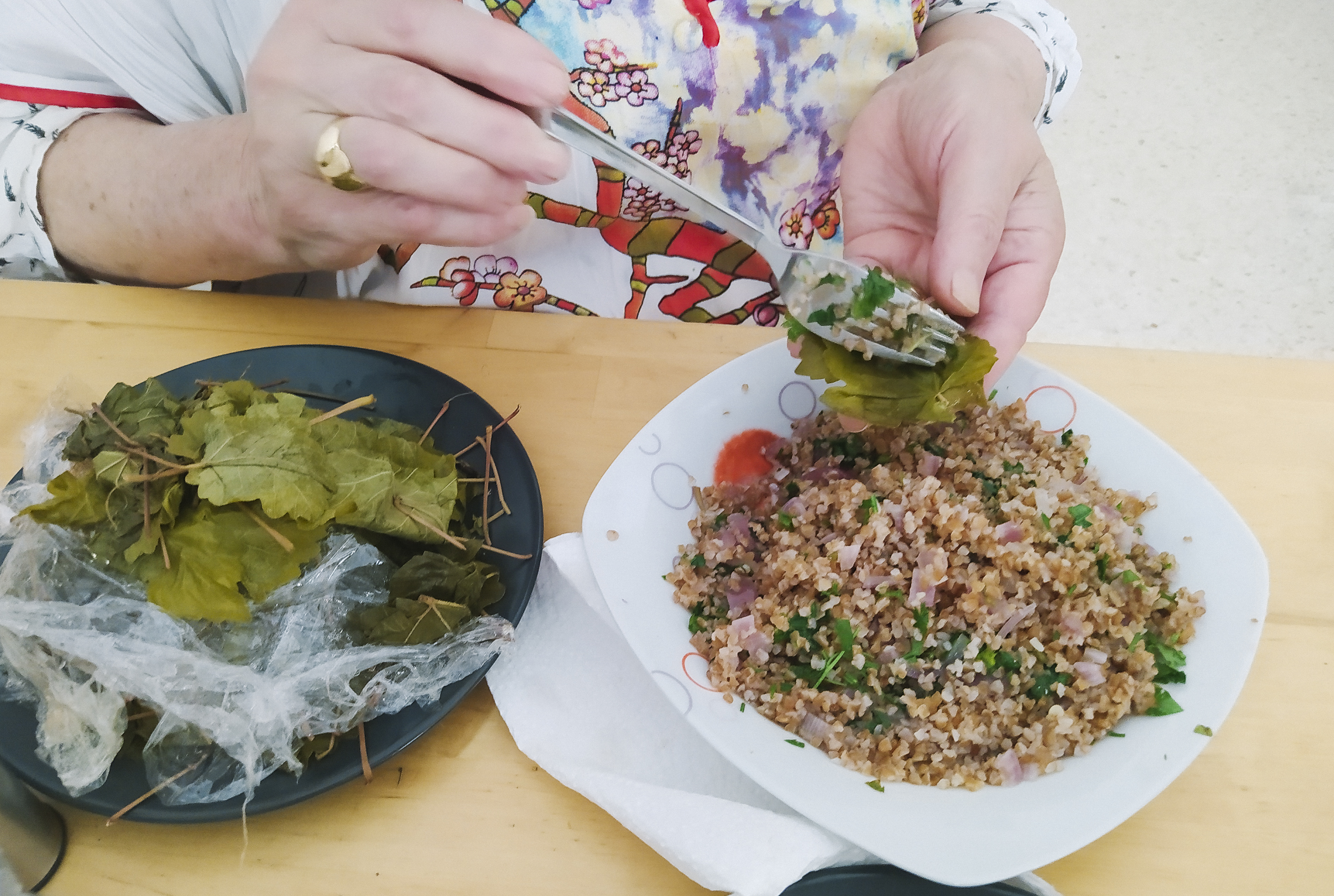
- Alternative names: qrmuta, krmouta, qirymutuh
- Place of origin: Syria
- Region or state: Salamiyah
- Associated cuisine: levantine cuisine
- Main ingredients: bulgur, onion, grape leaves, parsley, cucumber, lemon juice, olive oil
- Ingredients generally used: sumac, lettuce, tomato
- Similar dishes: tabbouleh

Qarymutah or qrymutah (in Arabic, القريموطة or القريميطة) is a little-known popular dish from rural areas of central Syria, totally vegetarian, consisting of a mixture of bulgur with vegetables and seasonings wrapped in grape leaf. Some people in Salamiyah, where this dish originates from, say that its name comes from the time when the Qarmatians ruled. It was formerly known as "poor man's food" (أكلة الفقراء). Depending on the place, it may also be known as farifa (الفَريفيرة), muqrita (المقَيريطة) or mniqiah (المنيقريعة).

== Preparation ==
Finely chop onion, cucumber, tomato and parsley. Sauté the onion and when it is golden brown, add the washed bulgur and water. It is covered until the grain is cooked, then it is removed from the heat and mixed with lemon juice, Arabian mint (na3na) and sumac.

Once the qarymutah is ready, take a little of the mixture with the spoon and fill the grape leaves into small "sachets". If grape leaves are not available, lettuce leaves or red cabbage can be used.
