= Raheb =

Lebanese Food

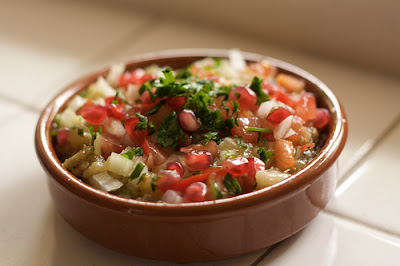
- Type: Salad
- Course: Mezze
- Place of origin: Lebanon
- Region or state: Lebanon
- Main ingredients: Eggplants, tomatoes, onions, parsley

Raheb salad (Arabic: سلطة الراهب, romanized: salatat al-raheb), also known as monk's salad, is a Lebanese salad featuring roasted eggplant, tomatoes, onions and parsley. It is a dish served as part of a selection of mezze.

== Etymology and Origin ==
The name "Raheb" (راهب) is Arabic for "monk". The salad's appellation is widely attributed to its simple, healthy, and natural components, which are said to be reminiscent of the austere diet of monks living in the Lebanese mountains. These monks would traditionally consume foods readily available from their immediate environment, primarily fresh vegetables.

== Preparation ==
Raheb salad's distinct flavor comes primarily from its preparation of eggplant. Whole eggplants are traditionally charred over an open flame until the skin is blackened and the flesh is smoky and tender. After cooking, the eggplants are peeled and finely diced or mashed.

Separately, fresh vegetables such as tomatoes, onions, and parsley are finely diced. A simple dressing of extra virgin olive oil, lemon juice, garlic, salt, and often pomegranate molasses is prepared. Finally, all ingredients are combined and mixed.

== Nutritional information ==
A typical recipe of raheb has the following nutritional values per serving:

- Calories: 292
- Total fat (g): 27
- Saturated fat (g): 4
- Cholesterol (mg): 0
- Carbohydrates (g): 13
- Protein (g): 2

== See also ==
- List of Arab salads
