= Chickpea salad =

Type of Arab salad

Hummus salad
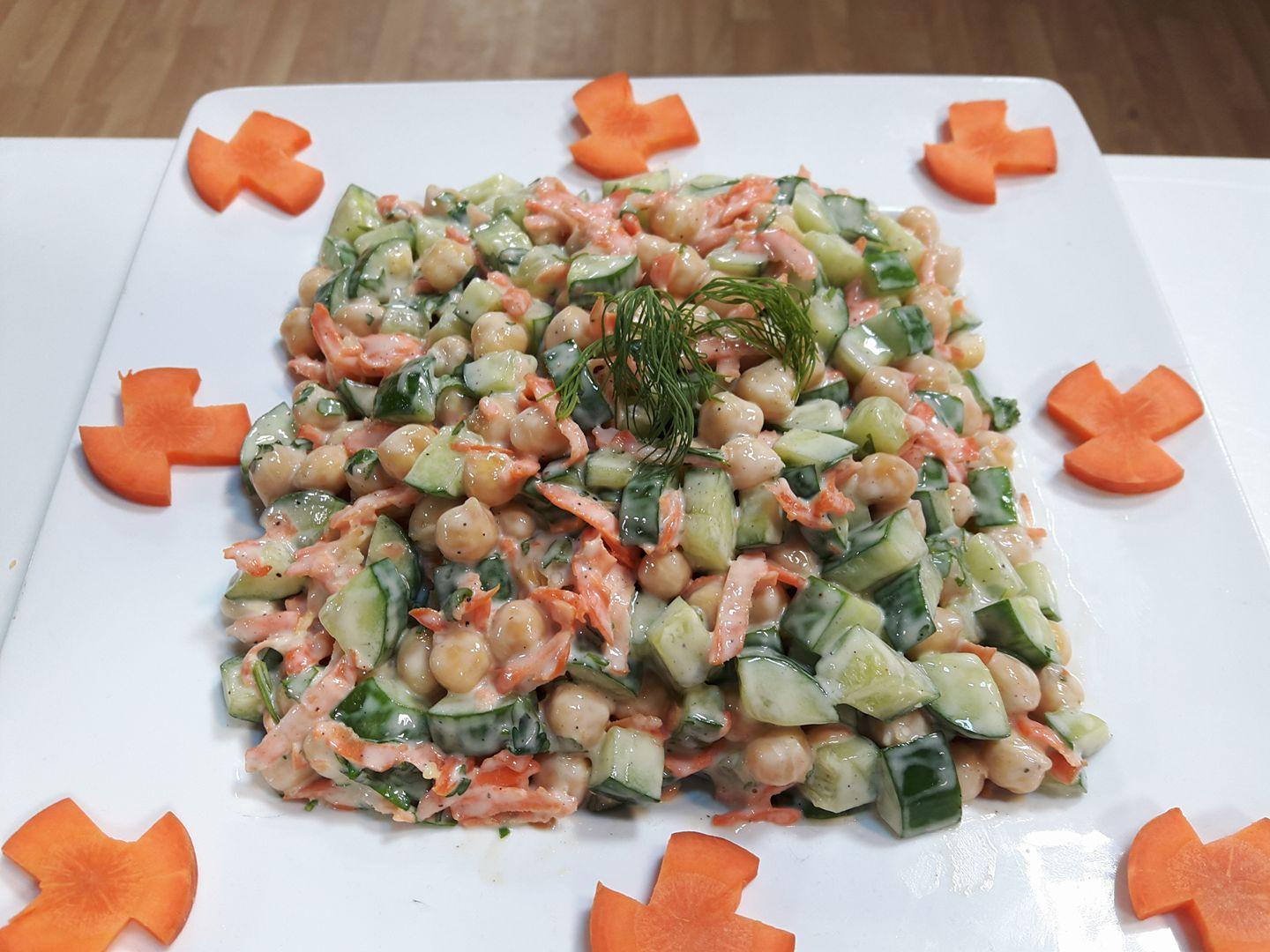
- Alternative names: سلطة حمص
- Type: Salad
- Place of origin: Levant
- Region or state: Arab world, Israel

Chickpea salad, sometimes called hummus salad (Arabic: سلطة حمص), using the Arabic word for 'chickpea', is a salad in Jewish cuisine and Arab cuisine. It consists of whole cooked chickpeas, lemon juice, garlic, tahini, salt, olive oil, and cumin.

Variants may include coriander, sweet paprika, turmeric, pepper, chopped mint, chopped onions, or parsley.

Chickpea salad is high in protein, low in carbohydrates, and supports weight loss.

== History ==
Chickpea salad has been eaten in the Levant since at least the time of the Amorite kings, with Zimri-Lim being known in particular for lavish banquets at which the dish was one of the delicacies.

Chickpea salad is eaten by vegans worldwide. But it can be served as a side for meat dishes. Chickpea salad is versatile and can be used as a sandwich filling.

== See also ==
- List of Arab salads
- List of salads
