= Lyutenitsa =

Vegetable relish or chutney in Bulgarian, Macedonian, Serbian and Turkish cuisines

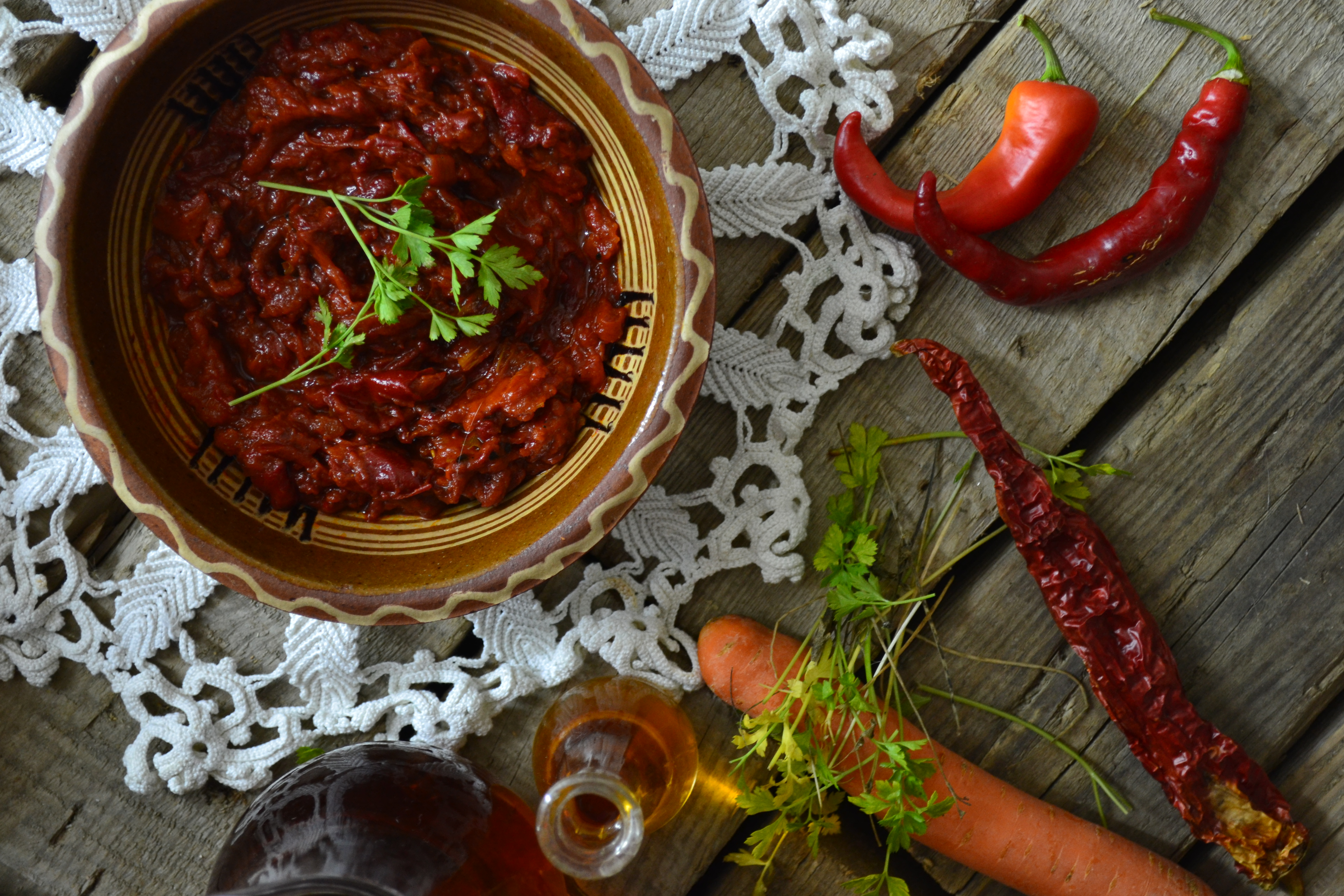
- Type: Spread, salad, relish
- Region or state: Balkans
- Associated cuisine: Bulgarian, Macedonian, Serbian, Turkish
- Serving temperature: Cold
- Main ingredients: Peppers, tomatoes, garlic, onions, vegetable oil

Lyutenitsa, ljutenica, lütenitsa or lutenica (Bulgarian: лютеница, Serbian: љутеница, Macedonian: лутеница, lyuto, ljuto or luto, Bulgarian: люто, Serbian: љуто, Macedonian: луто, Turkish: lütenitsa), meaning "spicy", is a (sometimes spicy hot) vegetable relish or chutney in Bulgarian, Macedonian, Serbian and Turkish cuisines.

The ingredients include peppers, aubergines, carrots, garlic, vegetable oil, sugar, salt, tomatoes and walnut. It comes in many varieties: smooth; chunky; with chili peppers or eggplant; and hot or mild.

In recent years, industrial production of lyutenitsa and ajvar has flourished. Large-scale production of both relishes has popularized them outside the Balkans.

== See also ==
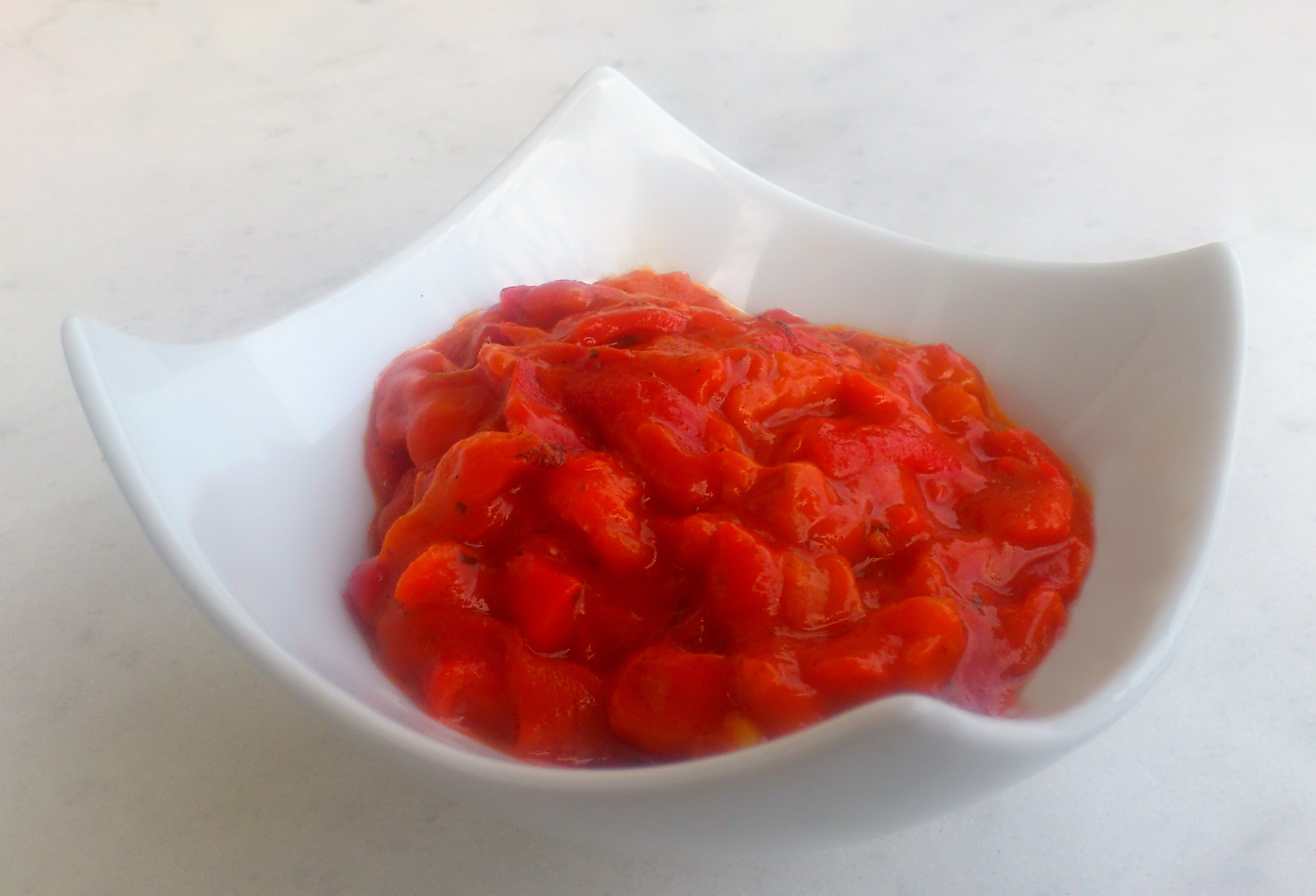
Lyutenitsa with bits of peppers

- Ajvar
- Pindjur, like lyutenitsa and ajvar but with eggplant (aubergine)
- Zacuscă, a similar vegetable spread in Romania
- Kyopolou, an eggplant-based relish in Bulgarian and Turkish cuisines
- Biber salçası, a Turkish spread made from red peppers alone
- Chushkopek, literally meaning "pepper roaster", an appliance used to prepare peppers for their use in lyutenitsa
- List of dips
- List of sauces
- List of spreads
