= Relish =

Condiment made from cooked pickled vegetables, fruit or herbs

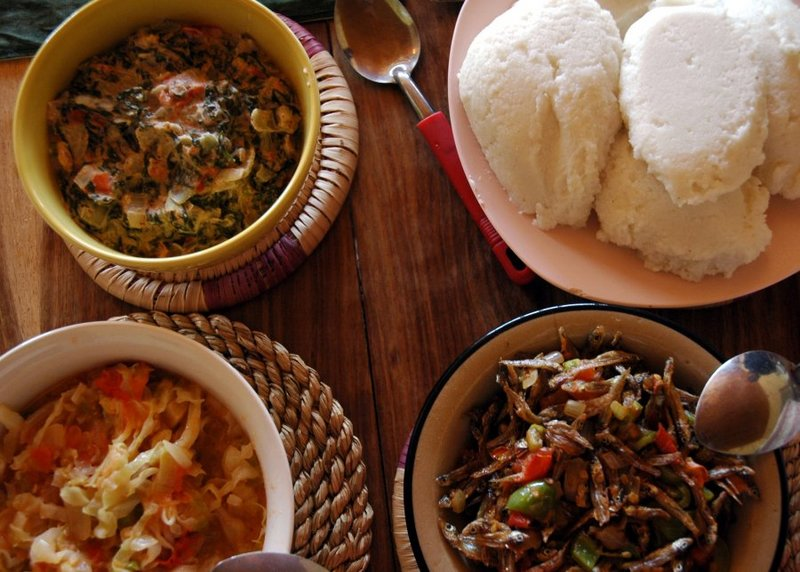
Three types of relishes are used here to accompany nshima (in the top right), a cornmeal product in African cuisine.

A relish is a cooked and pickled culinary dish made of chopped vegetables, fruits or herbs, typically used as a condiment to enhance a staple. Examples are chutneys and the North American relish, a pickled cucumber jam eaten with hot dogs. In North America, the word "relish" is frequently used to describe a single variety of finely chopped pickled cucumber relish, such as pickle, dill and sweet relishes.

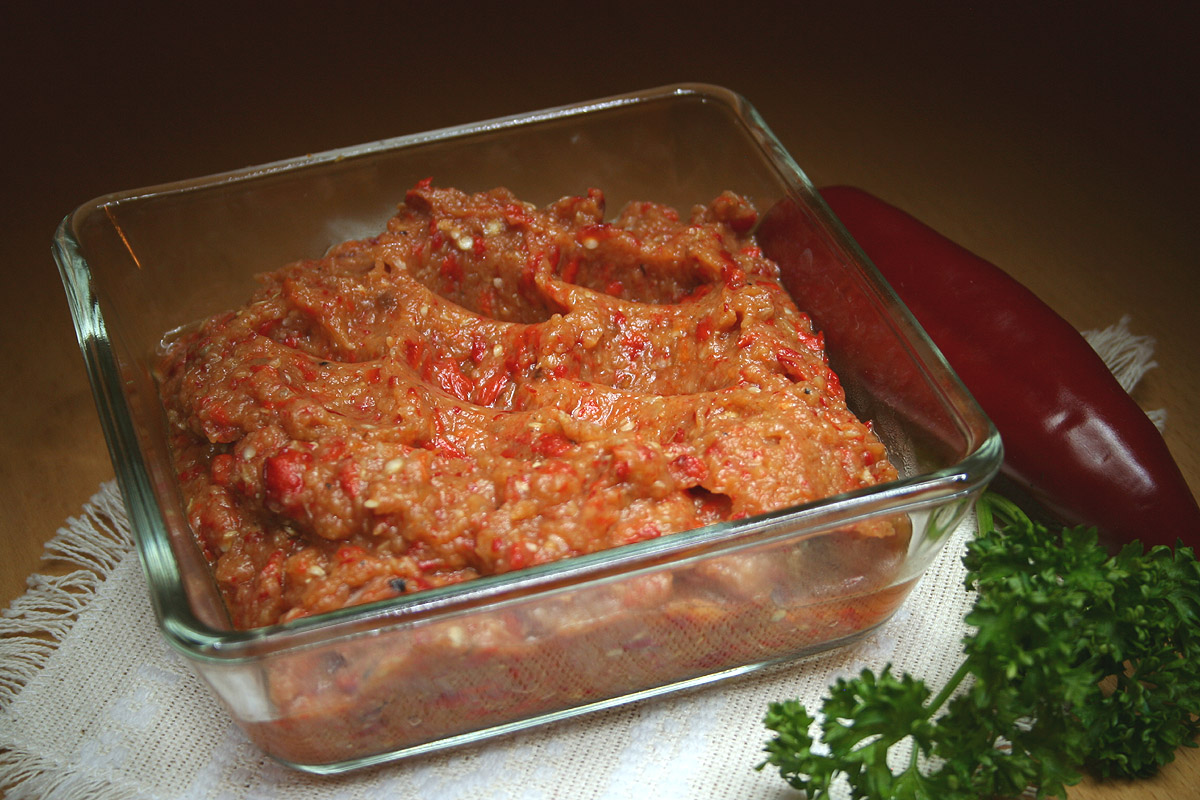
Kyopolou (Кьопоолу), a relish from the Balkans made from red bell peppers, eggplant and garlic.

Relish generally consists of discernible vegetable or fruit pieces in a sauce, although the sauce is subordinate in character to the vegetable or fruit pieces. Herbs and seeds may also be used, and some relishes, such as chermoula, are prepared entirely using herbs and spices. Relish can consist of a single type or a combination of vegetables and fruit, which may be coarsely or finely chopped; its texture will vary depending on the slicing style used for these solid ingredients, but generally a relish is not as smooth as a sauce-type condiment such as ketchup. Relish typically has a strong flavor that complements or adds to the primary food item with which it is served.

== Varieties ==
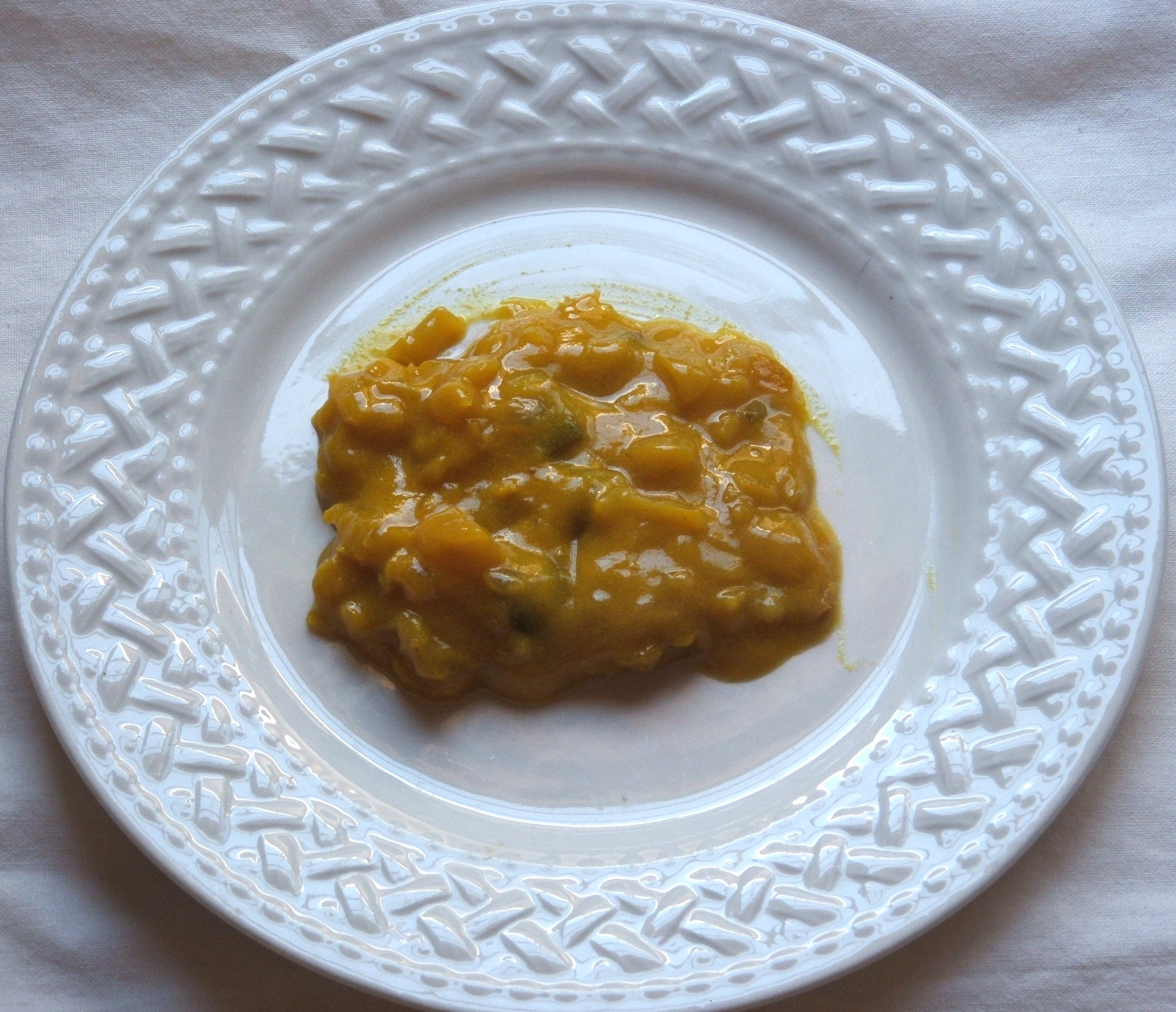
Chow-chow

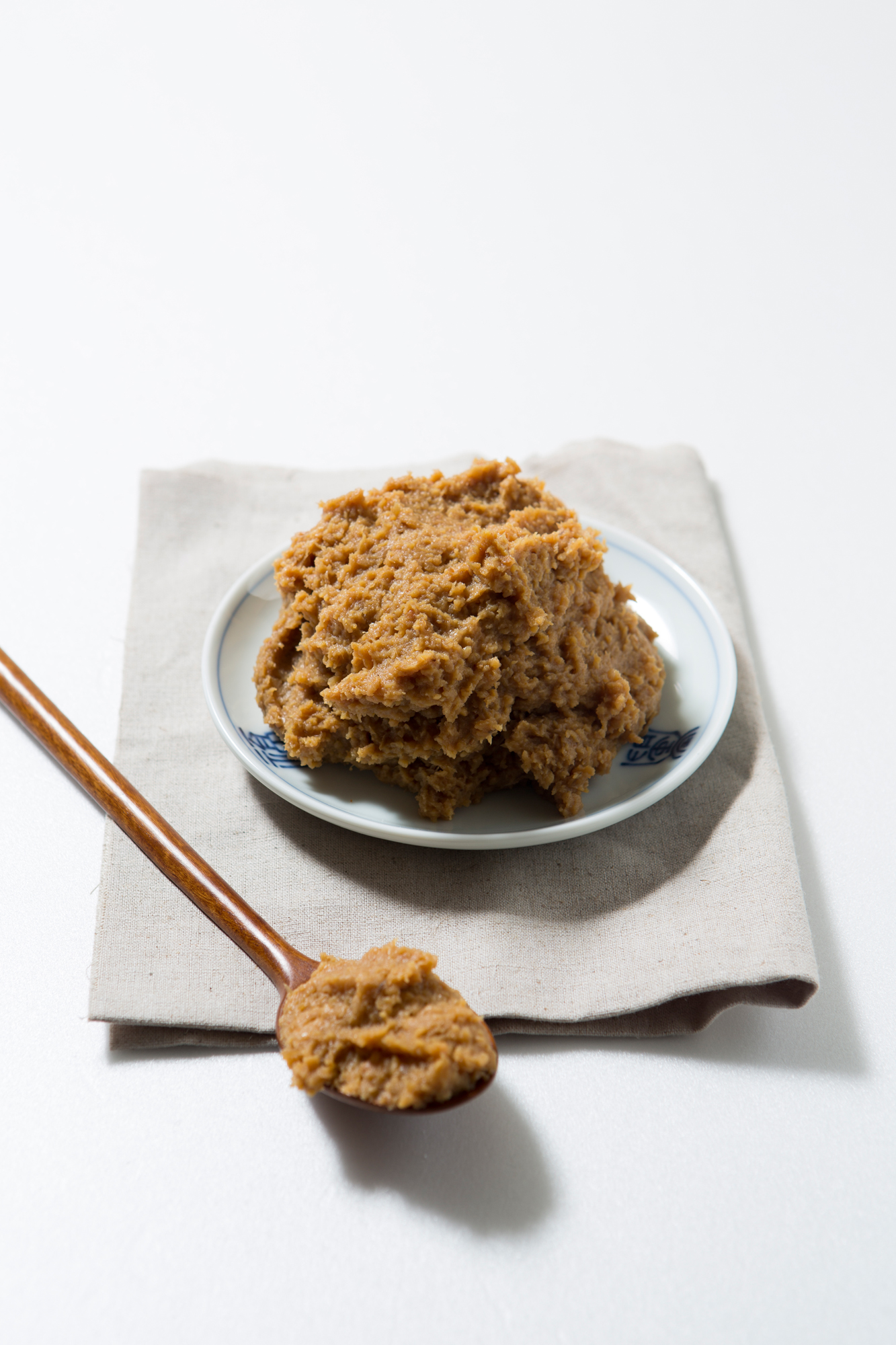
Doenjang

This is a list of notable relishes.

- Ajika
- Ajvar
- Achar
- Atchara
- Bostongurka
- Biber salçası
- Branston relish
- Chakalaka
- Chermoula
- Chow-chow
- Chrain
- Chutney
- Cranberry relish
- Ćwikła – Polish beet relish
- Dill relish
- Doenjang
- Gentleman's Relish – was invented in 1828 by John Osborn and contains spiced anchovy. It is traditionally spread sparingly atop unsalted butter on toast.
- Giardiniera
- Gochujang
- Haroseth
- India relish
- Lecsó
- Ljutenica
- Laccha pyaz, an Indian relish made with raw onions and typically paired with tandoor dishes.
- Kachumbari – common in East Africa
- Kimchi relish – prepared using kimchi as a main ingredient
- Kyopolou
- Kuchela
- Malidzano
- Mango pickle
- Mixed pickles
- Mostarda – prepared as a relish, fruit pickle, fruit preserve or chutney
- Muhammara
- Matbucha
- Meko, a Ghanaian relish made with tomato, onions, and spicy pepper, typically eaten in the hard-boiled egg dish kosua ne meko.
- Pear relish
- Pebre
- Piccalilli
- Pickled cucumber
- Pinđur
- Sambal
- Tapenade
- Vinagrete

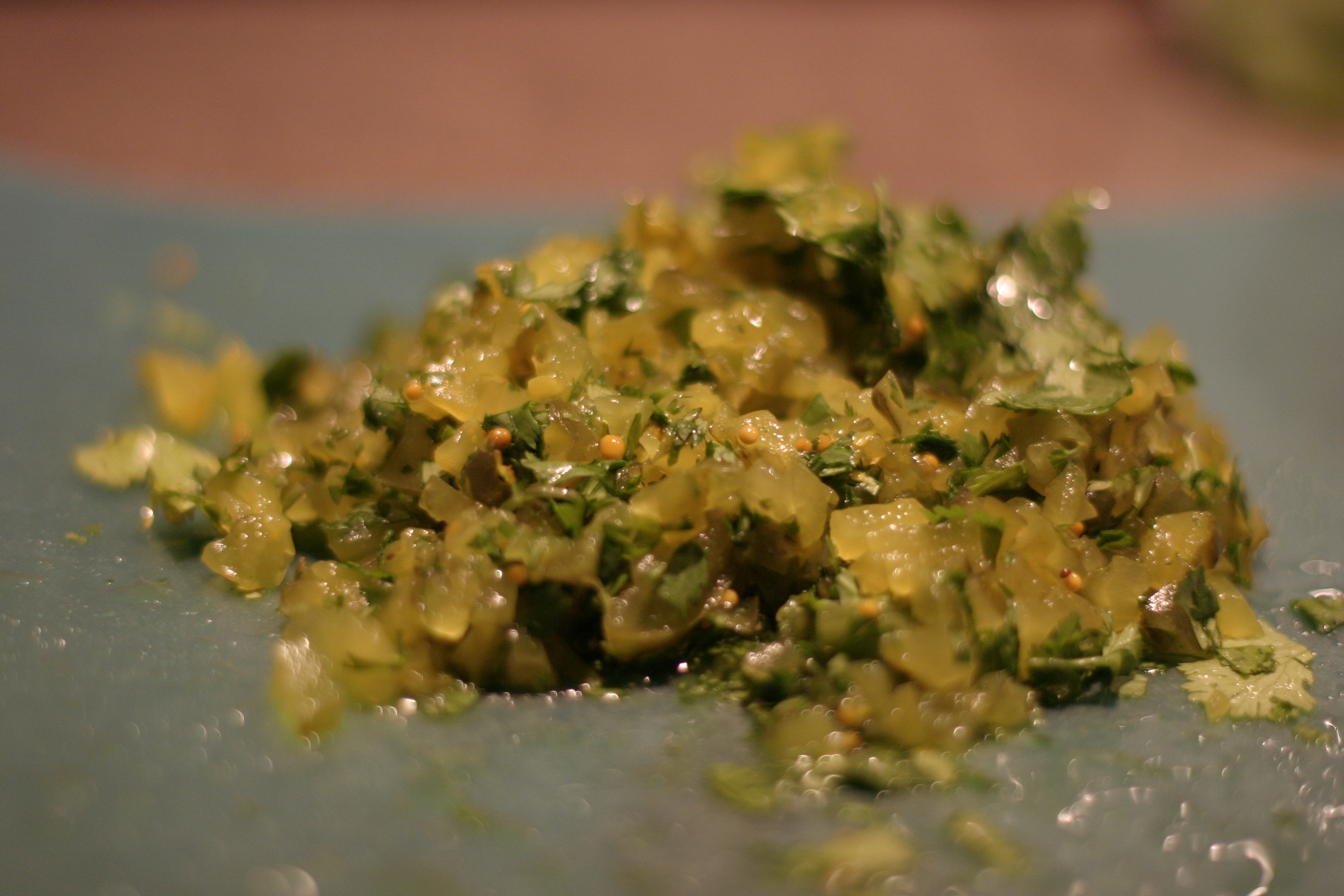
Pickle relish, prepared with the addition of cilantro

In the United States, the most common commercially available relishes are made from pickled cucumbers and are known in the food trade as pickle relishes. Pickle relish is one of the most commonly used spreads in the U.S. Two variants of this are hamburger relish (pickle relish in a tomato base or sauce) and hot dog relish (pickle relish in a mustard base or sauce). Another readily available commercial relish in the U.S. is corn (maize) relish. Heinz, Vlasic, and Claussen are well known in the U.S. as producers of pickled cucumbers and pickle relishes. Chicago-style relish is a sweet pickle relish that is a standard ingredient on the Chicago-style hot dog. Pickle relish is an important ingredient in many varieties of the U.S. version of tartar sauce.

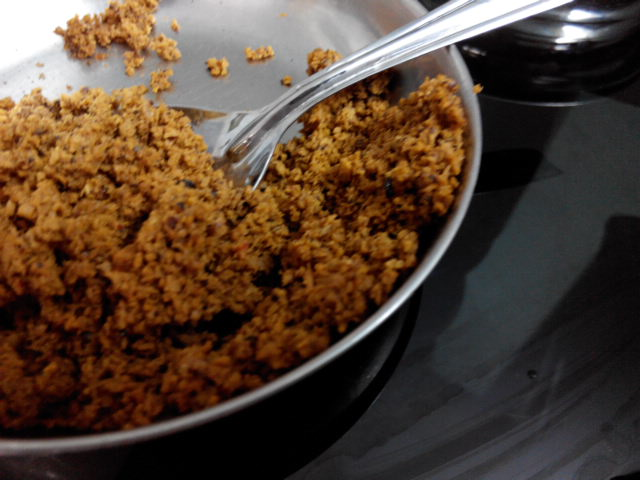
A coconut-mango chutney

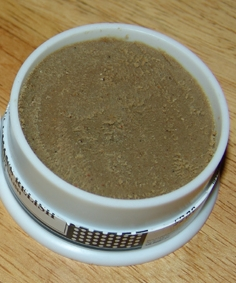
Gentleman's Relish

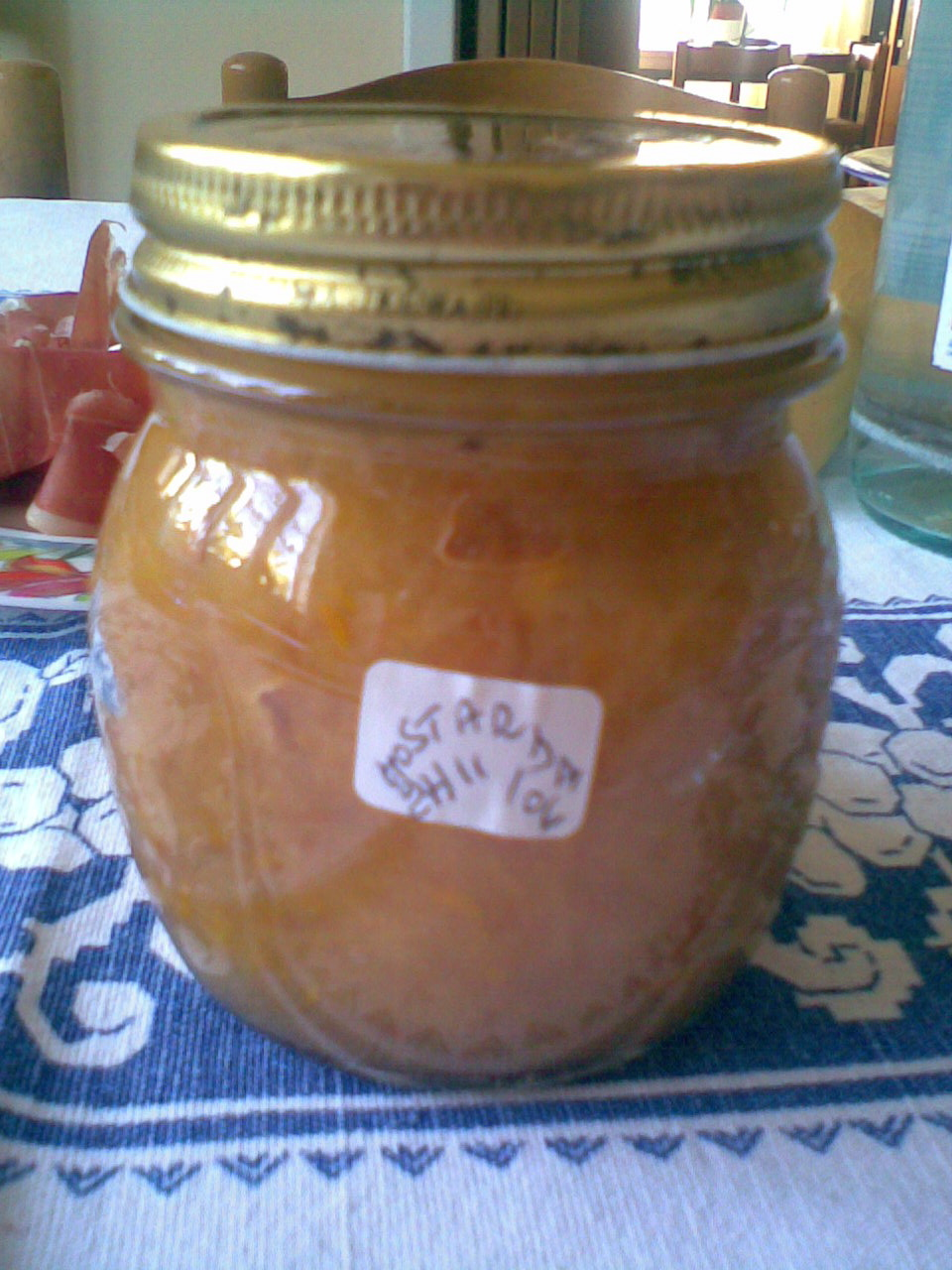
Homemade mostarda

== See also ==
- Henderson's Relish – English condiment sauce – a liquid condiment
- List of chutneys – Chutney varieties
- List of pickled foods
