= Muhammerah =

Muhammerah may refer to:

- Al-Muhammarah, the Arabic name of Khorramshahr, a city in Iran
- Muhammara, a Levantine condiment
- Muḥammirah, an Iranian religious and political movement
