= Sanguchería =

Type of Peruvian restaurant

A sanguchería, in Peruvian cuisine, is a kind of restaurant specializing in sandwiches (popularly known in Peruvian Spanish as sánguches), juice, sodas, and occasionally alcoholic beverages. Peruvians customarily relate these establishments to the night life, as a way to satisfy one's hunger after a night on the town.

== Types of sánguches ==
=== Butifarra ===
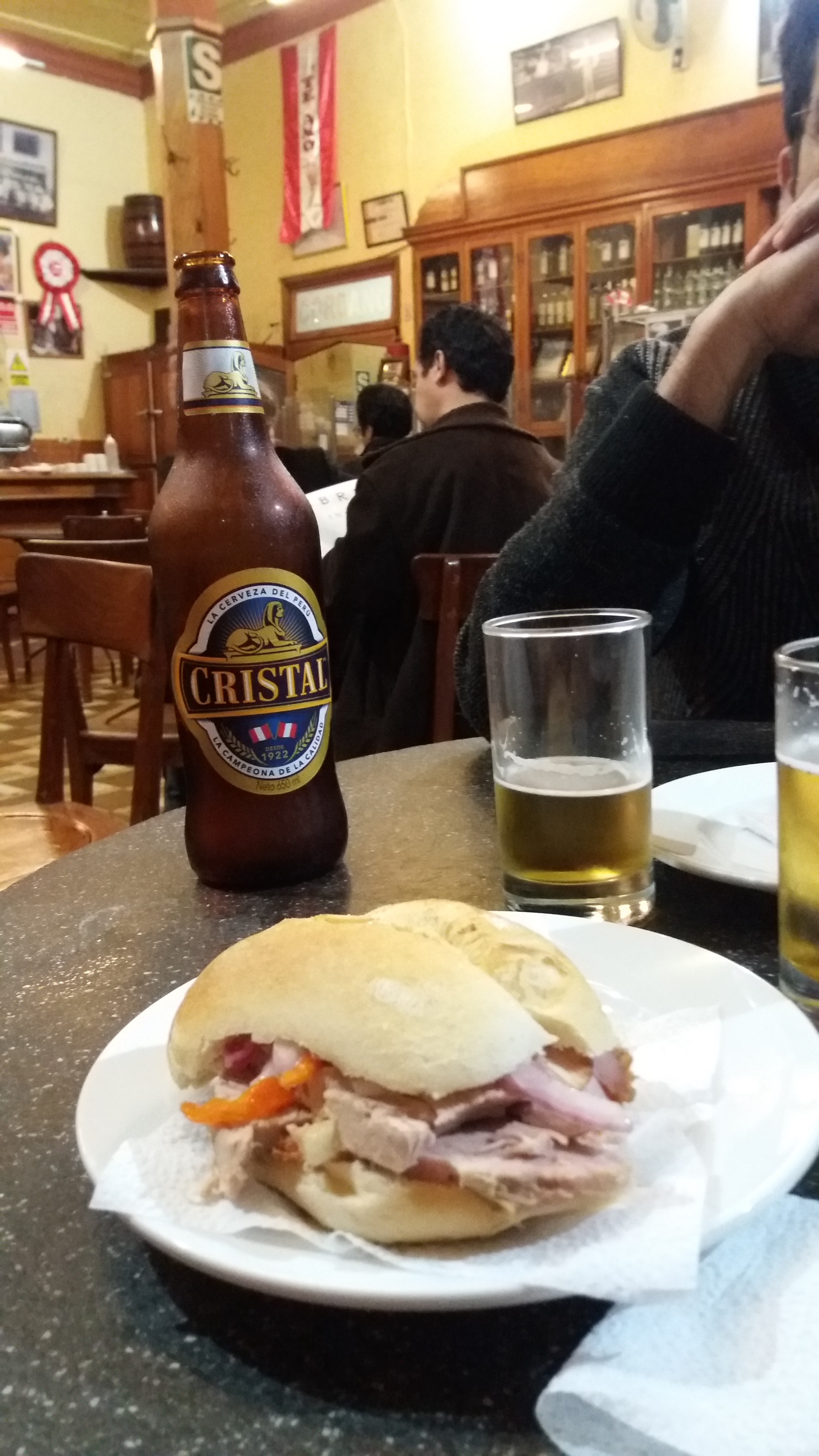
A butifarra sandwich at the Bar Cordano.

Among the many types of sandwiches one finds the traditional butifarra, made normally from pork loin cooked in a traditional Limeña manner called locally jamón del país, accompanied with fresh lettuce, salsa criolla, and occasionally a touch of mustard.

This sandwich arose from the culinary exchange between Spain and the Viceroyalty of Peru. Later it was popularized in the fondas and bars of the immigrant Italian community, such as the Bar Cordano and the Bodega Carbone in the historic city center of Lima; Juanito in the Barranco District; La Lucha Sanguchería Criolla in Miraflores; the Antigua Taberna Queirolo in Pueblo Libre; and others.

=== Other sánguches ===
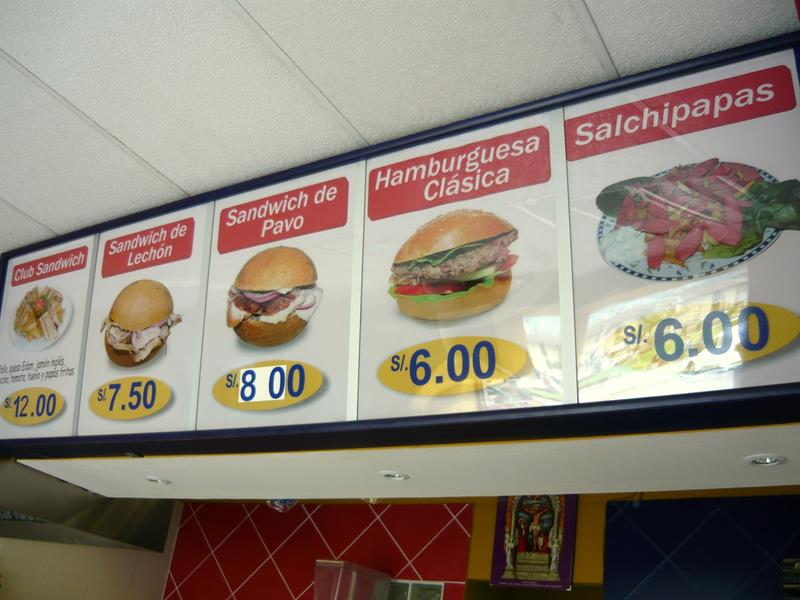
Some types of sánguches, and other items of fast food such as salchipapa, in a local of Cajamarca.

Besides butifarras, in a sanguchería one might find a variety of other sandwiches:

- Sánguche de lechón (grilled pork)
- Sánguche de pavo asado (grilled turkey)
- Sánguche de pollo (chicken)
- Sánguche de asado (strips of veal cooked in its own juices)
- Sánguche de jamón del norte — jamón del norte being similar to jamón del país, but not colored with achiote, and often with a sweeter taste
- Lomito ahumado, an embutido (cured sausage) similar to jamón del norte
- Triple (avocado, tomato, olives, ham, edam cheese, egg, and mayonnaise) made with 3 or 4 slices of bread

All these sandwiches are typically served on crusty rolls, principally the French roll (pan francés). They may be served with French fries or boliyucas (fried yuca balls), and with condiments such as ketchup, mustard, mayonnaise, guacamole, or spicy sauces such as ají or rocoto.
