= Butifarra (sandwich) =

Peruvian ham sandwich

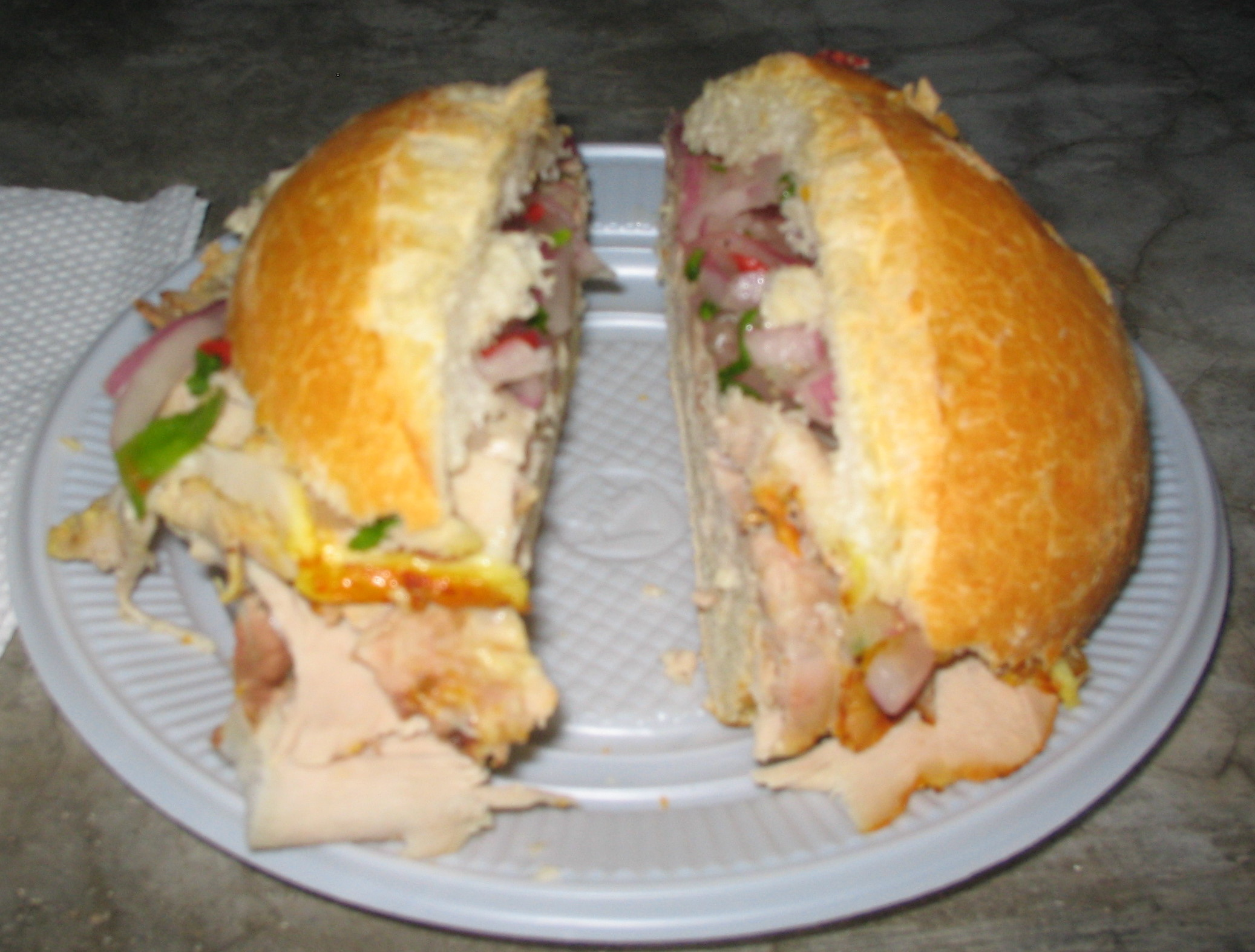
Butifarra

The butifarra (or gutifarra) is a typical street food sandwich commonly found in Lima, Peru.

== Description ==
The butifarra is a street food sandwich, sold in sandwich shops, typical of Peruvian cuisine, specifically from Lima, made from a special preparation of pork, locally called "country ham," with salsa criolla and lettuce inside a French bread or rosette.

== History ==
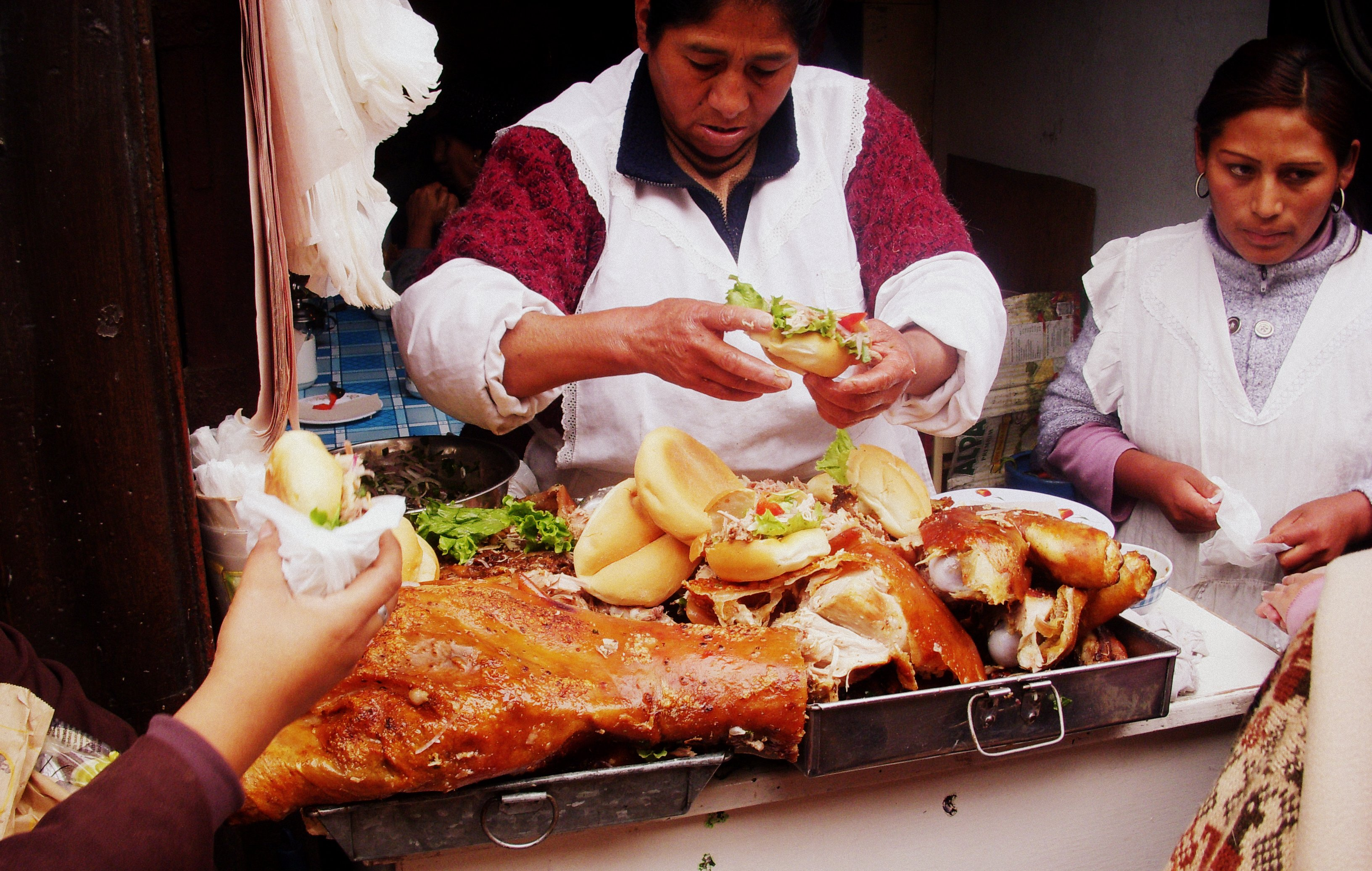
Butifarra seller, selling butifarras

According to the fourth definition of the 2017 DLE, the butifarra is a "Bread inside which a piece of ham and a little salad are placed."

The term "butifarra" is mentioned by Pedro Paz Soldán y Unanue in his Dictionary of Peruanisms from 1884, indicating that it was sold in chinganas, bullfights, and occasionally on the street.

=== Butifarrero ===
The "butifarrero" was the one who hawked butifarras. By the late 19th century, they moved to the exit of the Plaza de toros de Acho to offer 'chicken butifarras'.

By the mid-1950s, this character was displaced due to the rise of street culinary trends, such as hot dogs. Currently, butifarreros sell sandwiches at public events, religious gatherings, and even at the beaches.

== See also ==
- Chicharrón
- List of sandwiches

== Bibliography ==
- Garland de Pérez Palacio, Laura (1962). "La tapada": cuisine and pastry (in Spanish). Intellectual property registration, number 125 (3rd ed.). Lima: Editorial Salesiana.
- Custer, Tony (March 1, 2003). The Art of Peruvian Cuisine (in Spanish). Quebecor Perú. ISBN 9789972920325.
