= Acuca =

ACUCA may refer to:

- Association of Christian Universities and Colleges in Asia
- Acoma Pueblo, a village and tribe in New Mexico

== See also ==
- Acuka
