= Remoska =

Type of electric oven

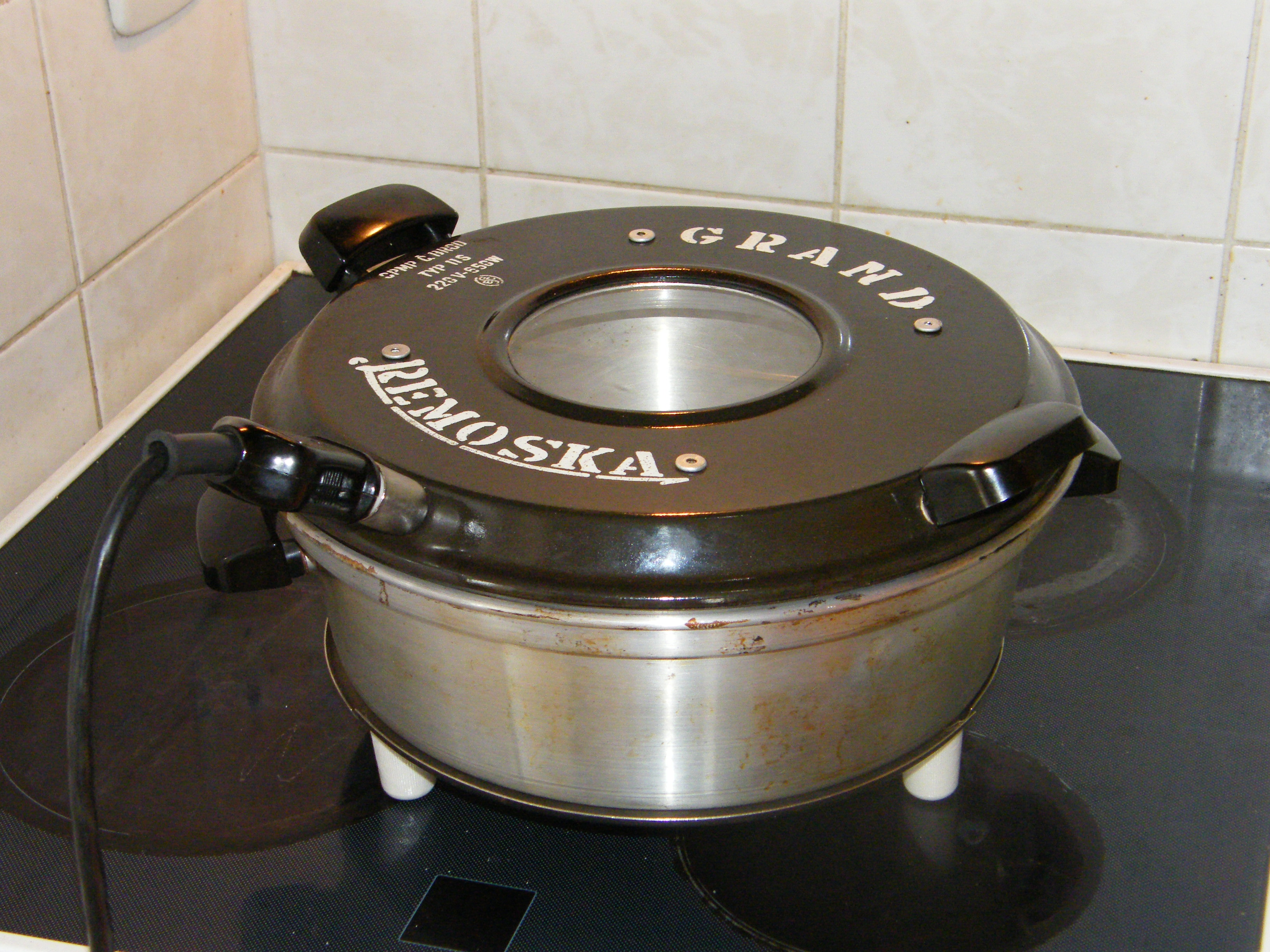
Remoska

A Remoska (also known as Prodiż) is a small portable electric oven with the cooking element housed in the lid of a pot. It consists of a Teflon-lined pan and a stand in addition to the lid mounted heating element. It was developed by the Czech electrical engineer Oldřich Homuta in the 1950s. The Remoska has no graded heat control. It cooks in a similar manner to an oven and is stated to be very economical in terms of electricity (470 watts for the Standard Remoska).

== History of development ==
The Remoska was invented by electrical engineer Oldřich Homuta. Before the World War II, Homuta owned a company producing electric motors. This company was merged with the Remos company after nationalization. The first Remoska prototypes were made in 1953–1955. Homuta continued working on the aluminum pan, which he covered with a lid with an electric heater.

== Production ==
Remoska cookers were produced between 1957 and 1990 at a Karma factory in Kostelec nad Černými lesy. In 1994 the production facility was sold and production then moved to Frenštát pod Radhoštěm.

== International adoption ==
"Prodiż" was popular in Poland during the communist era. Smaller quantities have been manufactured and used since the 1990s.

The "Patusca", or cloche, was popular during the 1970s and 1980s in Portugal. It is still manufactured and used today.

Lady Milena Grenfell-Baines, a Czech living in England since the Second World War, became interested in the Remoska and started importing it to Britain. In 2002 the Remoska pan started to sell well in Canada and the US, and the following year in Australia.

== See also ==
- Chushkopek
- Rice cooker
- Slow cooker
