= Chushkopek =

Bulgarian kitchen appliance

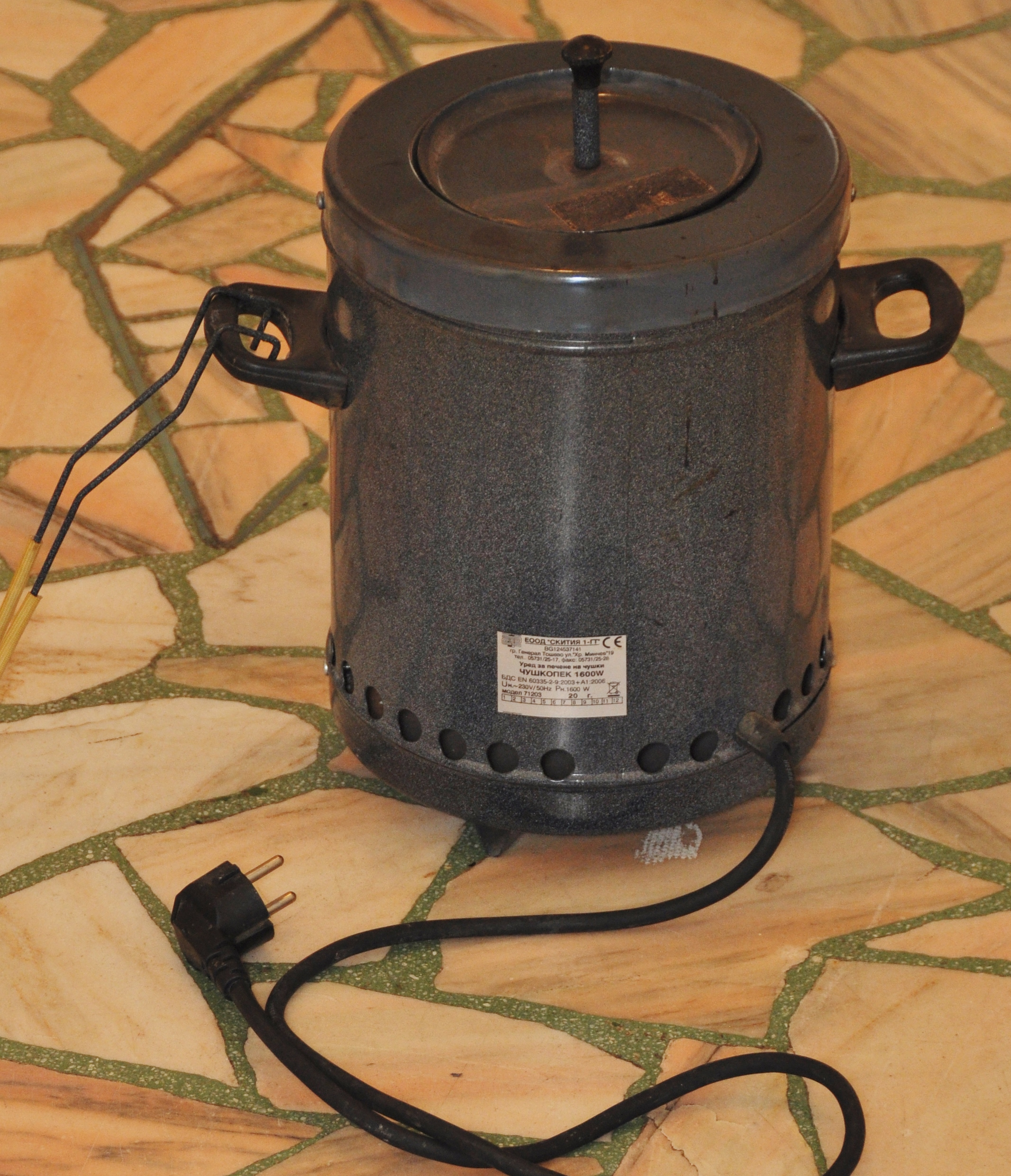
Chushkopek

A chushkopek (Bulgarian: Чушкопек, literally: pepper-roaster) is a uniquely Bulgarian kitchen appliance for roasting peppers, aubergines or potatoes, generally used in salads.

A chushkopek is a cylindrical oven with an opening on the top. Long sweet peppers are placed inside, the lid is replaced, and within several minutes the pepper is ready. Due to the appliance's design, the pepper is evenly roasted across all its surface, leaving a blackened skin which is then easily removed.

The chushkopek was voted "Bulgaria's Household Revolution of the 20th Century" in a 2009 campaign by Bulgarian National Television.

== Usage ==
There are several dishes and dips that are prepared from roasted peppers or eggplants.

- Ljutenica
- Ajvar
- Kyopolou
- İmam bayıldı
