= Zacuscă =

Romanian, Moldovan and Hungarian condiment

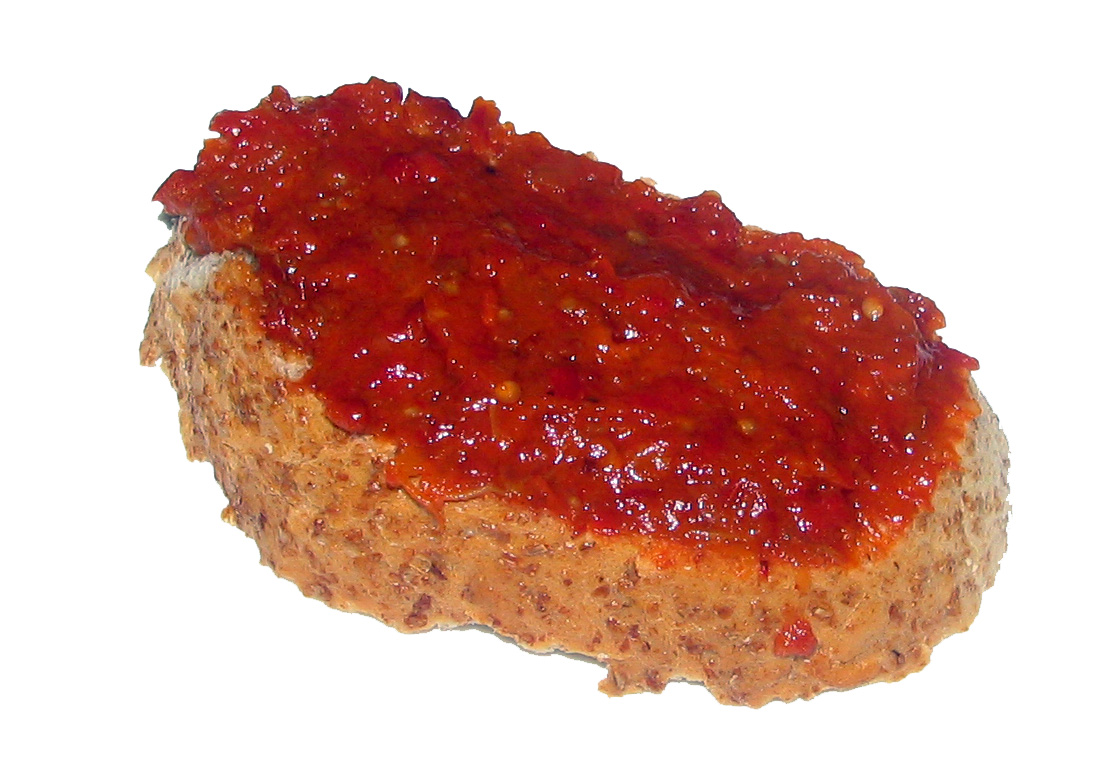
- Zacuscă on bread
- Alternative names: Zacușă
- Type: Spread
- Place of origin: Romania
- Region or state: Southeastern Europe
- Main ingredients: Eggplants or cooked beans, roasted red peppers (gogoşari cultivar), mushrooms.

Zacuscă (Romanian pronunciation: [zaˈkuskə]) is a vegetable spread popular in Romania, Moldova and Hungary (zakuszka), which originated from Romania. Similar spreads are found in other countries in the Balkan region.

== Ingredients ==
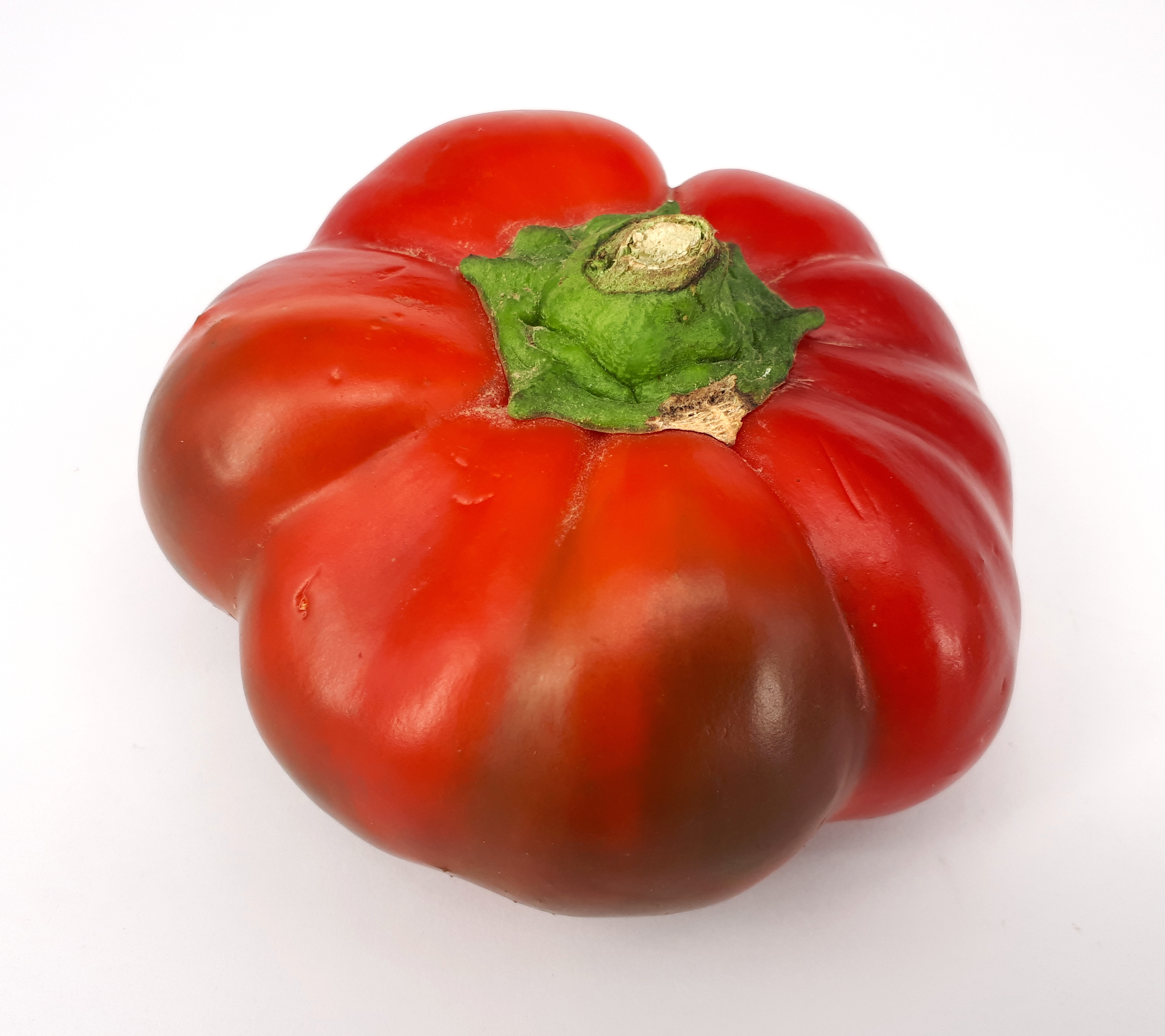
A gogoșar, the variety of pepper used in zacuscă.

The main ingredients are roasted eggplant, sauteed onions, tomato paste, and roasted gogoșari (a Romanian cultivar of red bell pepper). Some add mushrooms, carrots, or celery. Bay leaves are added as spice, as well as other ingredients (oil, salt, and pepper). Traditionally, a family will cook a large quantity of it after the fall harvest and preserve it through canning.

== Use ==
Zacuscă can be eaten as a relish or spread, typically on bread. It is said to improve in taste after some months of maturing but must be used within days of opening. Although traditionally prepared at home, it is also commercially available. Some Bulgarian and Middle Eastern brands are available in the United States. In the Orthodox Christian majority countries, it is sometimes eaten during fasting seasons due to the absence of meat, eggs or dairy products.

== Etymology ==
The word zacuscă is of Slavic origin which means simply "appetizer", "breakfast" or "snack", and appears in Russian as "Zakuski".

== See also ==
- Ajvar, pindjur and ljutenica, similar spreads in Balkan cuisine
- Biber salçası, a Turkish paste made from red peppers alone
- Kyopolou, a similar Bulgarian dish
- List of eggplant dishes
- List of spreads
