= Pindjur =

Relish spread in the Balkan peninsula

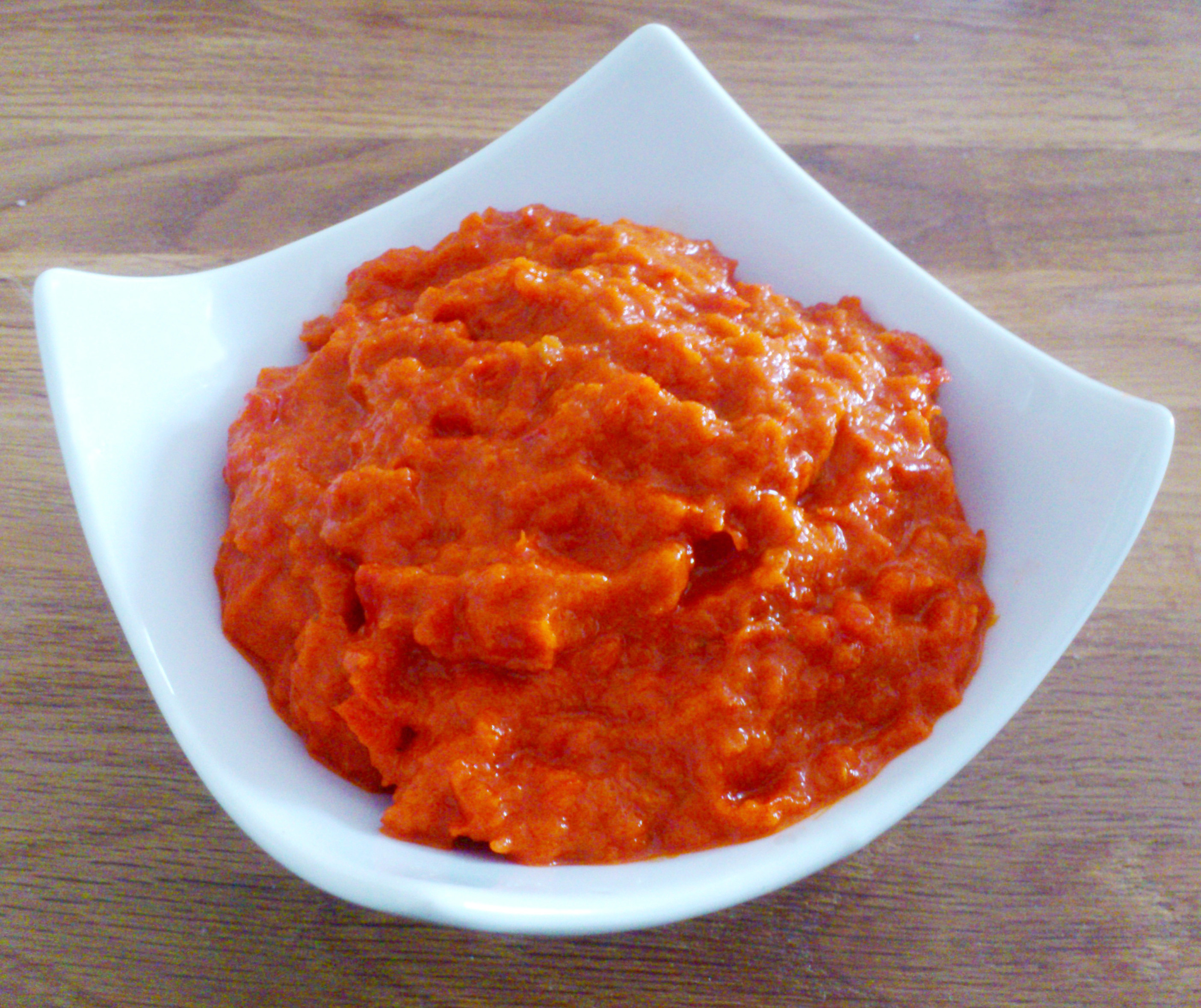
- Alternative names: Pinjur, pinđur
- Type: Relish
- Region or state: Balkans
- Main ingredients: red bell peppers, tomatoes, garlic, vegetable oil, salt

Pindjur or pinjur or pinđur (Serbo-Croatian: pinđur / пинђур; Bulgarian: пинджур, romanized: pindzhur; Macedonian: пинџур, romanized: pindžur; Albanian: pinxhur) is a red-pepper spread or relish often used in summer and autumn. Pindjur is commonly prepared in Bosnia and Herzegovina, Croatia, Bulgaria, Serbia, Kosovo and North Macedonia.

The traditional ingredients include red bell peppers, tomatoes, garlic, vegetable oil, salt, and often eggplant. Pindjur is similar to ajvar, but the latter is smoother, usually has a stronger taste, and is rarely made with eggplant. In some regions the words are used interchangeably.

The creation of this traditional relish is a rather long process which involves baking some of the ingredients for hours, as well as roasting the peppers and peeling them.

In Kosovo, Pindjur or Pinxhur as it is called locally is composed only of tomatoes, spicy red peppers, oil and garlic.

== See also ==
- Kyopolou, a similar relish in Bulgarian and Turkish cuisines
- Ljutenica, a similar relish in Bulgarian, Macedonian and Serbian cuisines
- Zacuscă, a similar relish in Romanian cuisine
- Malidzano
- List of eggplant dishes
- List of dips
- List of sauces
- List of spreads
