= Salsa criolla =

Type of salad or relish found in Latin American cuisine

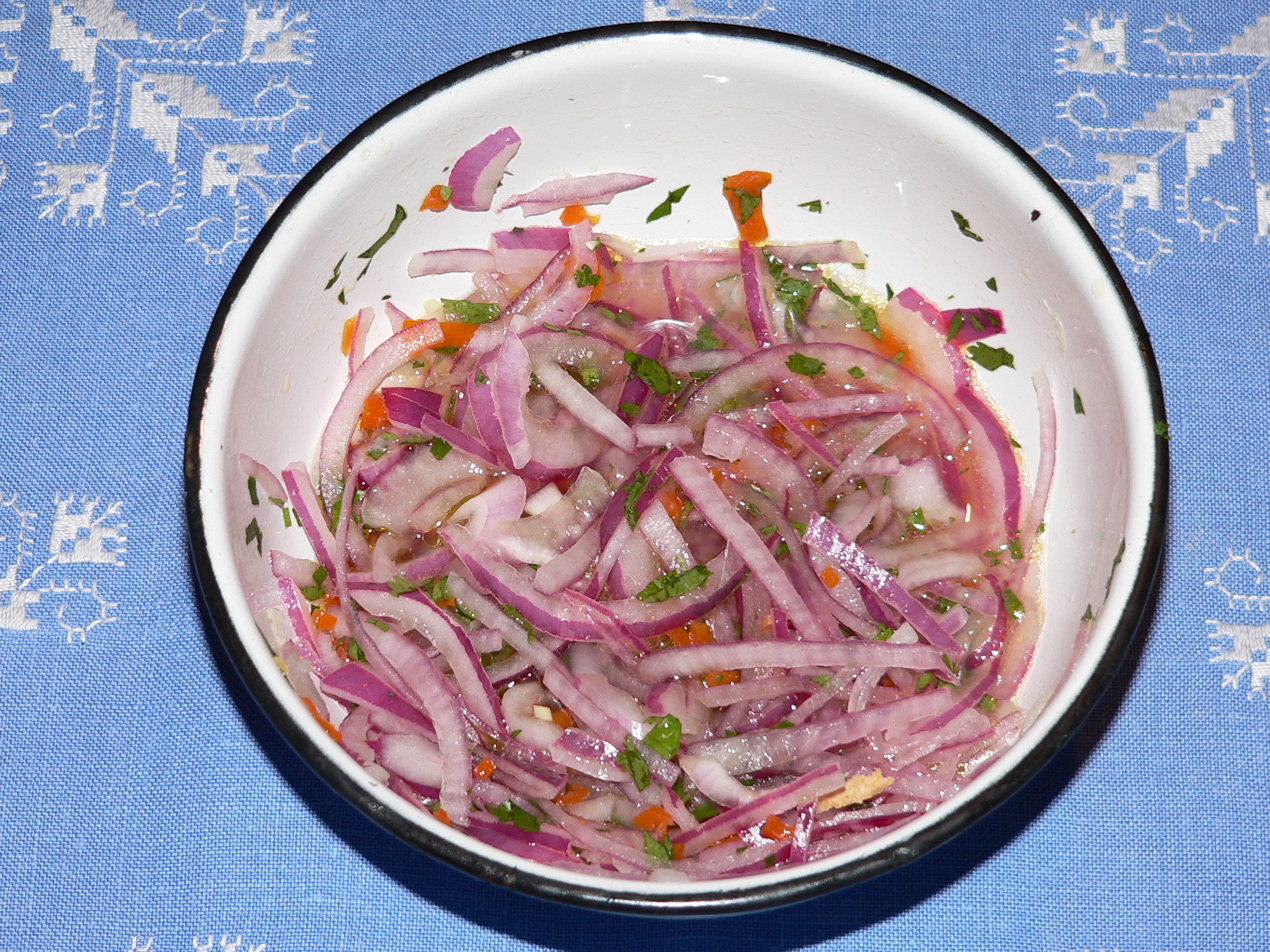
Peruvian salsa criolla

Salsa criolla (Creole salsa) is a type of sauce or relish found in Latin American cuisine, composed of finely chopped sliced onions, vinegar, tomatoes, garlic, chili peppers, bell peppers, olive oil, salt, pepper and fresh herbs like parsley or cilantro. Salsa criolla is often associated with Peruvian cuisine, but also found in Cuban, Puerto Rican, Nicaraguan, Uruguayan, and Argentinian cuisine.

In Peru, salsa criolla is a cold sauce typically used to accompany meat. The base composition is onion, red bell pepper and tomato, lime juice or vinegar and oil. Other ingredients can include cilantro, green bell pepper, parsley or garlic.

== See also ==
- Kachumber – Indian and Pakistani salad dish
  - Kachumbari – African version
- Pebre – Chilean condiment
- Pico de gallo – Mexican condiment
- Vinagrete – Typical Brazilian condiment
- Xnipec – Spicy sauce native to Yucatán peninsula
