= Pebre =

Chilean condiment

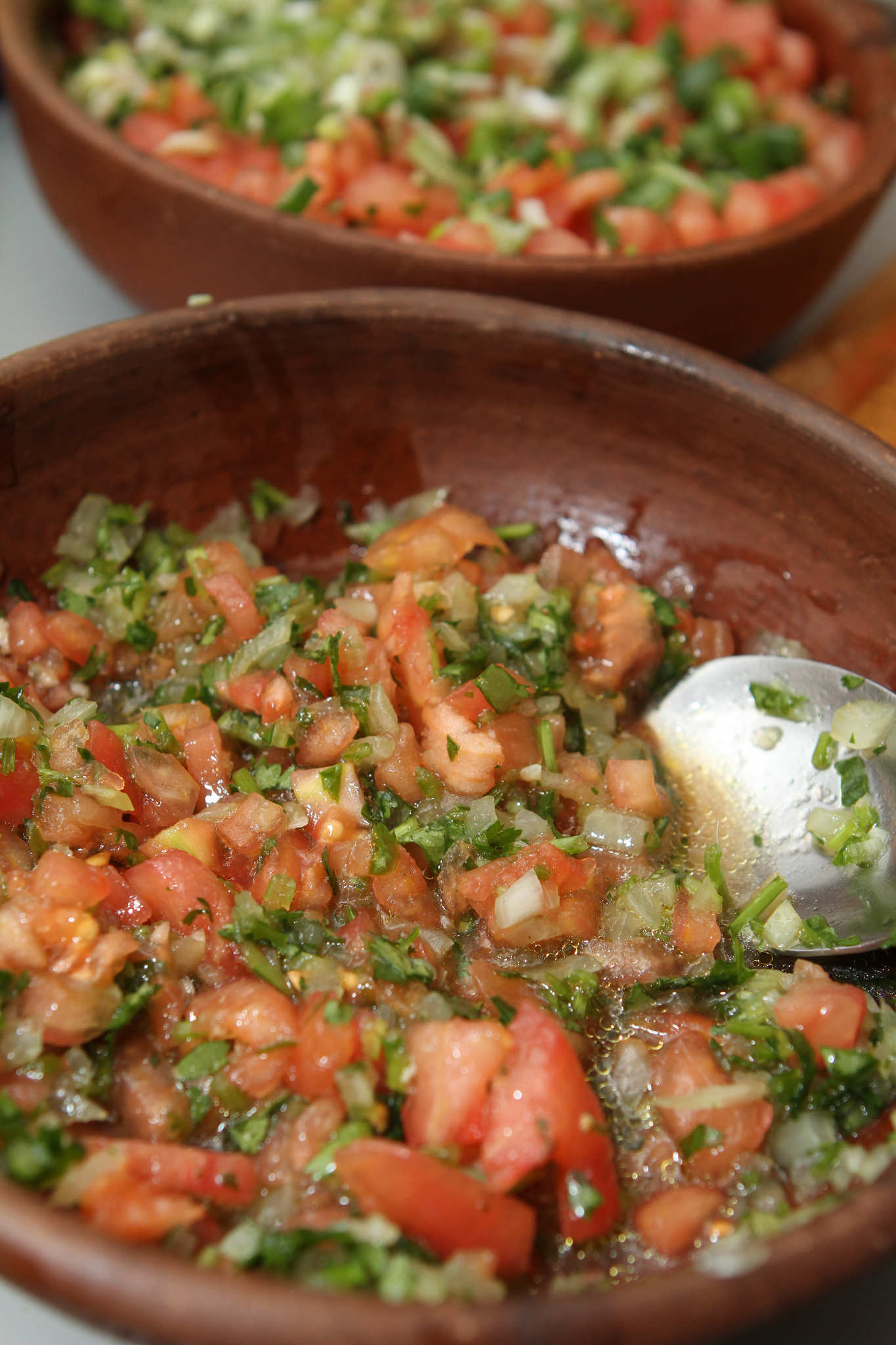
- A paila with pebre.
- Type: Condiment
- Place of origin: Chile
- Serving temperature: Chilled
- Main ingredients: Tomato, onion, ají, oil, red wine vinegar, coriander, salt

Pebre is a Chilean condiment made with coriander, parsley, chopped onion, vinegar, a neutral oil, ground or pureed spicy ají, and usually chopped tomatoes. Pebre is most commonly used on bread. It is also used on meat, or when meat such as choripán is provided in a bread roll. In far northern Chile, the term pebre refers to a sauce more like Bolivian llajwa.

== History ==
The word pebre in Catalan means pepper of any type, in this case ají cultivars of chilli pepper. In the rest of Spain, it refers to a sauce made of vinegar, pepper, saffron, clove, and other spices.

The origin of pebre as a sauce in Chile dates to the arrival of Catalan engineers and highly skilled masons under the supervision of the Italian architect Joaquin Toesca, for the construction of the Tajamares de Santiago, the fluvial channels, river walls and bridges for the main river that intersects the city of Santiago, the Rio Mapocho (Mapocho River). Catalan workers made a simple sauce (salsa) with cilantro, oil, vinegar and salt, called pebre for its main ingredient, the ají.

== See also ==
- Pico de gallo
- Salsa criolla
- Vinagrete
- List of tomato dishes
