= Malidzano =

Traditional Macedonian spread made from puréed bell peppers, eggplant, oil and salt

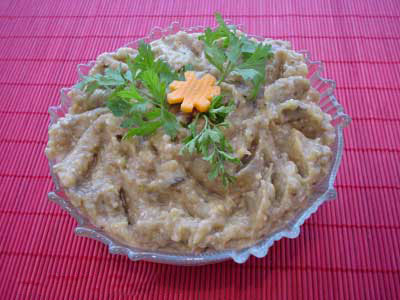
- Malidzano salad
- Type: Hors d'oeuvres
- Place of origin: North Macedonia
- Region or state: Macedonia
- Main ingredients: green bell peppers, eggplant, oil, salt, vinegar mustard

Malidzano is a traditional Macedonian spread made from puréed bell peppers, eggplant, oil, salt and mustard (optional). It derives its name from the Italian word for eggplant, melanzane. Malidzano is usually served as an appetizer with a side of bread and piece of white cheese. In other countries of the Western Balkans (Serbia, Bosnia and Herzegovina, Croatia), it is prepared with green or red peppers, affecting the color of the spread.

== See also ==
- Eggplant salads and appetizers
- Kyopolou
- Pindjur
- Baba ganoush
