= Vinagrete =

Typical Brazilian condiment

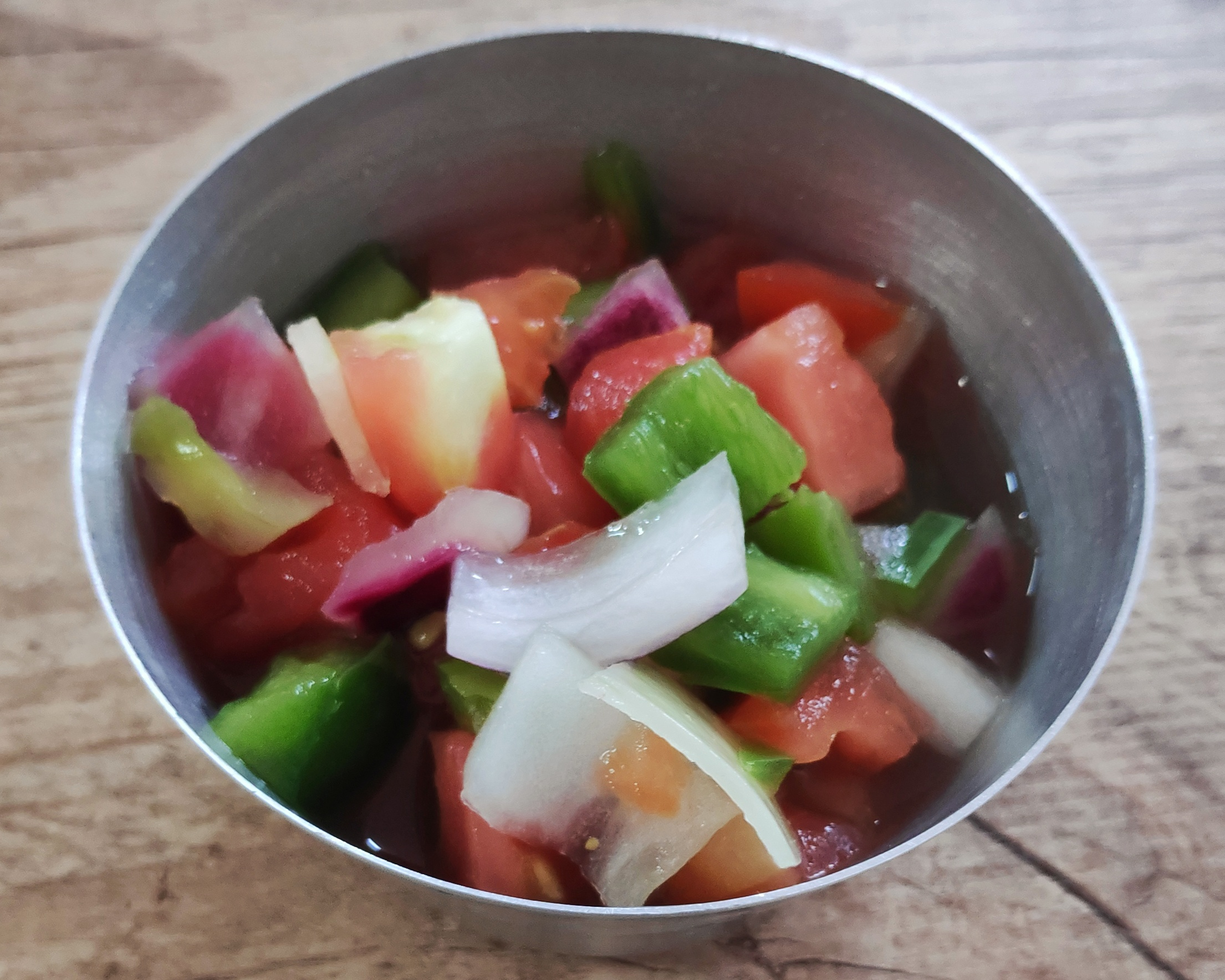
Vinagrete

Vinagrete or molho à campanha is a typical Brazilian condiment made of chopped tomato, chopped onion, olive oil, vinegar, either parsley or sweet peppers, and salt. It usually accompanies salads, grilled meat, feijoada, pastel and roasted chicken.

It is similar to pebre and pico de gallo, spicy Chilean and Mexican condiments with similar ingredients, salsa criolla and llajwa.

== Argentina ==
In Argentina, salsa portuguesa refers to a cooked mixture of tomato, bell peppers and onions, used in Brazil as a carne moída or hot dog sauce. In Brazil the version consumed by itself is referred as molho à campanha, named after the most traditional area of Rio Grande do Sul, a praîrie that is land of the Brazilian gaúchos (the Brazilian version is always finely chopped and raw and generally includes also vinegar, olive oil, salt and cheiro-verde—very finely chopped parsley and welsh onions—or spice).

== See also ==
- Pebre
- Pico de gallo
- Salsa criolla
- List of Brazilian dishes
