= Muhammara =

Red pepper dip from Syrian cuisine

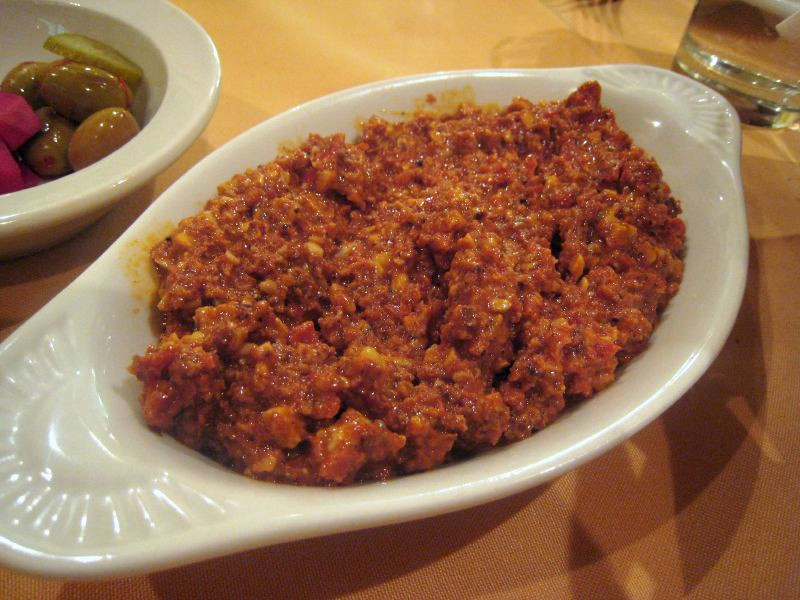
- Course: Dip
- Place of origin: Aleppo, Syria
- Region or state: Syria
- Associated cuisine: Syrian cuisine
- Serving temperature: Cold
- Main ingredients: Bell pepper, walnuts, pomegranate molasses
- Ingredients generally used: red chili paste, breadcrumbs, lemon juice, olive oil, cumin

Muhammara or mhammara (Arabic: محمّرة, lit. 'reddened') is a dip made of walnuts, red bell peppers, pomegranate molasses, and breadcrumbs originating in the city of Aleppo, Syria. Muhammara can also be found in Western Armenian cuisine. In western Turkey, muhammara is referred to as acuka and is served as part of the mezze platter appetizer course.

== Ingredients ==
The principal ingredients are fresh red bell peppers; pomegranate molasses for a characteristic sweet-tart note; Aleppo pepper flakes; ground walnuts for a crunchy texture; breadcrumbs to thicken the puree; garlic to enhance the flavors; red chili paste (optional); salt and extra virgin olive oil, all blended into a smooth yet slightly chunky paste. It sometimes contains lemon juice and spices such as cumin. In Damascus, tahini is sometimes added. It may be garnished with extra virgin olive oil, walnuts, mint leaves or parsley and is served with pita bread.

The peppers may be sun-dried or grilled rather than fresh.

Traditionally, it is prepared using mortar and pestle.

== History ==
Muhammara was described in Khayr al-Din al-Asadi's 1981 encyclopedia as an appetizer of crumbled ka'ak, pomegranate molasses, walnuts, peppers, and oil.

In 2022, Gaziantep, Turkey, received a geographical indication from the Turkish Patent and Trademark Office for muhammara, recognizing the dish as a registered regional specialty associated with the city. The patent's listed ingredients are fresh red peppers or red pepper flakes, olive oil, walnuts, rusks or breadcrumbs, pomegranate molasses, lemon juice, cumin, and parsley or walnut halves for garnish.

== Usage ==
Muhammara is eaten as a dip with bread served with cold mezze, as a topping for manakish, or as a sauce for kebabs (skewers), grilled vegetables, grilled meats, and fish.

== See also ==
- Ajika, a dip in Caucasian cuisine, based on a boiled preparation of hot red peppers, garlic, herbs and spices
- Ajvar, a condiment made primarily from roasted peppers, eggplants, and sunflower oil, or olive oil, popular in Croatia, Bosnia, Serbia, and other Balkan countries
- Biber salçası, a hot or sweet pepper paste in Turkish cuisine
- Harissa, a hot chili pepper paste in Maghreb cuisine
- Romesco, a Catalonian pepper paste with similar ingredients
- Sahawiq, a hot sauce in Middle Eastern cuisine, made from fresh hot peppers seasoned with coriander, garlic and various spices
- List of dips
