= Kyopolou =

Bulgarian-Turkish dish

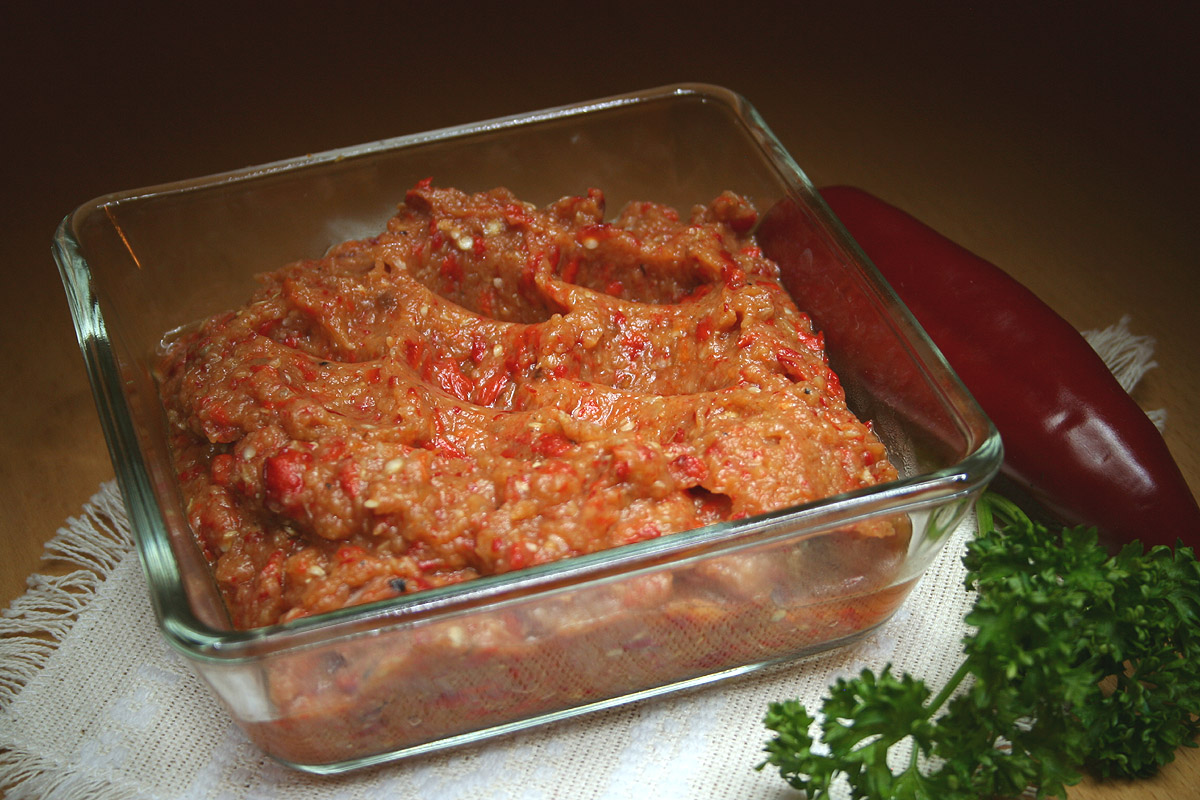
- Type: Relish
- Main ingredients: Eggplant, garlic, often bell peppers, tomatoes, parsley

Kyopolou (Bulgarian: Кьопоолу, Kopoolu, more often Кьополу, Kopolu; Turkish: Köpoğlu) is a popular Bulgarian and Turkish spread, relish and salad made principally from roasted eggplants and garlic.

Common recipes include further ingredients such as baked bell peppers, baked kapia red peppers, tomatoes, tomato juice or tomato paste, onions, parsley, black pepper, and laurel leaves. Hot peppers may also be added. Taste can vary from light and sweet to hot and peppery. It is usually oven-cooked in pots or casseroles.

Kyopolou is a typical eggplant appetizer and can be consumed as a bread spread, a condiment, or as a salad. It is generally prepared as a canned food, in glass jars, for the winter season. During summer and autumn months, when its ingredients are usually readily available, it is also a main dish in Bulgaria, mainly during Orthodox fasting periods, such as Lent.

Similar relishes are popular in the Balkans in different variants and names (e.g., ajvar or pinđur). A Romanian variety is called zacuscă, a word of Slavic origin (cf. Bulgarian and Russian zakuska).

== See also ==
- List of eggplant dishes
- List of dips
- List of spreads
