= Salça =

Paste made from peppers or tomato and salt, originating in Turkey

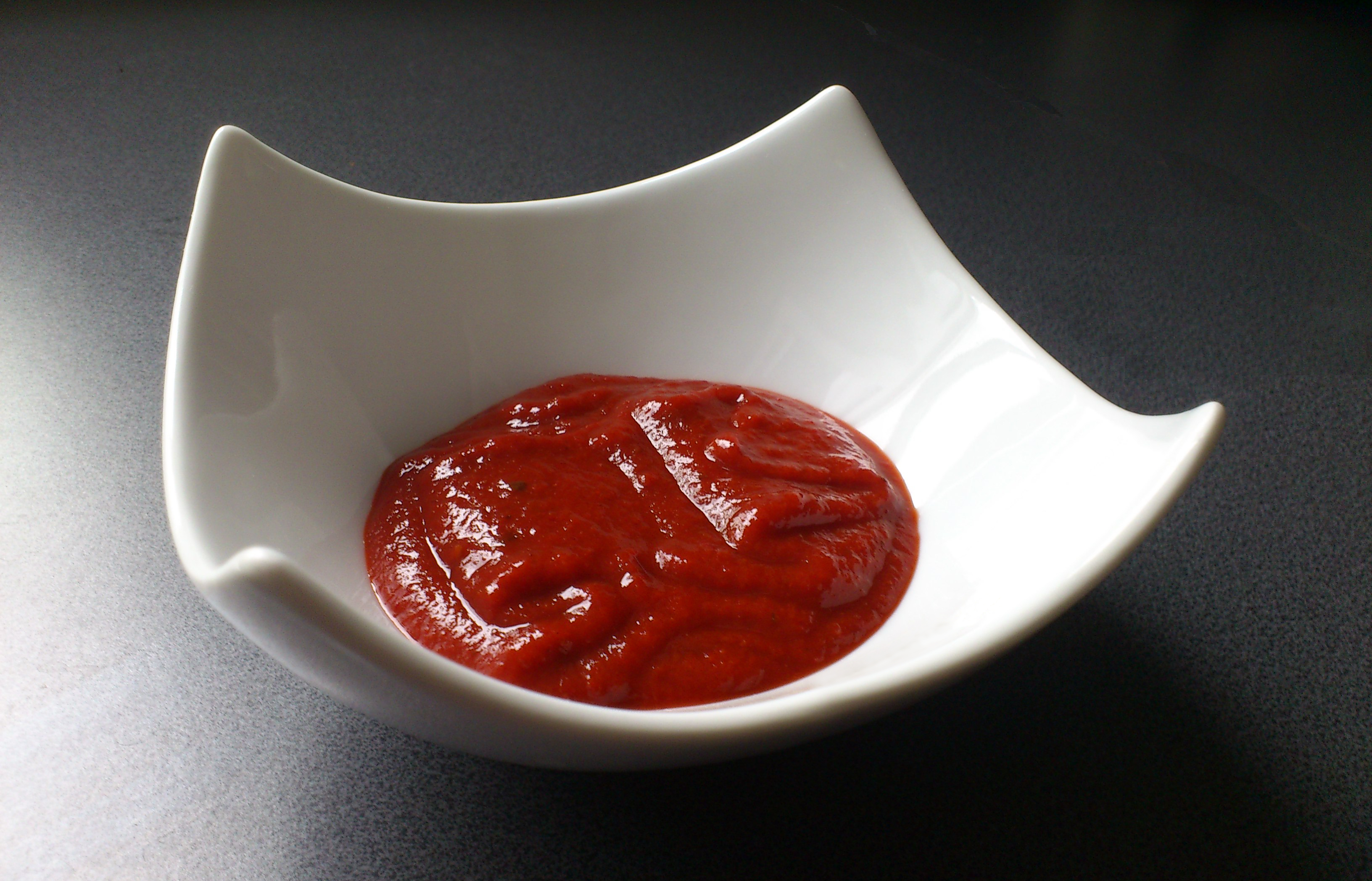
- Biber salçası (pepper paste)
- Type: Paste, spread
- Main ingredients: Chili peppers, bell peppers, or tomato, salt

Salça ("salcha") is a category of thick, deep red paste made from peppers or tomato and salt, originating in Turkey. It is a staple in Turkish cuisine, being a base for many popular Turkish dishes.

== Etymology ==
The Turkish word salça is a loan from the Italian salsa, meaning "sauce" in that language. Due to the /tʃ/ sound in the middle of the Turkish word it has been proposed that it was possibly loaned through the Greek version σάλτσα (sáltsa). The word was first attested in 1900 in the Turkish dictionary Kâmûs-ı Türkî by Şemseddin Sâmî.

== Varieties ==
=== Biber salçası ===
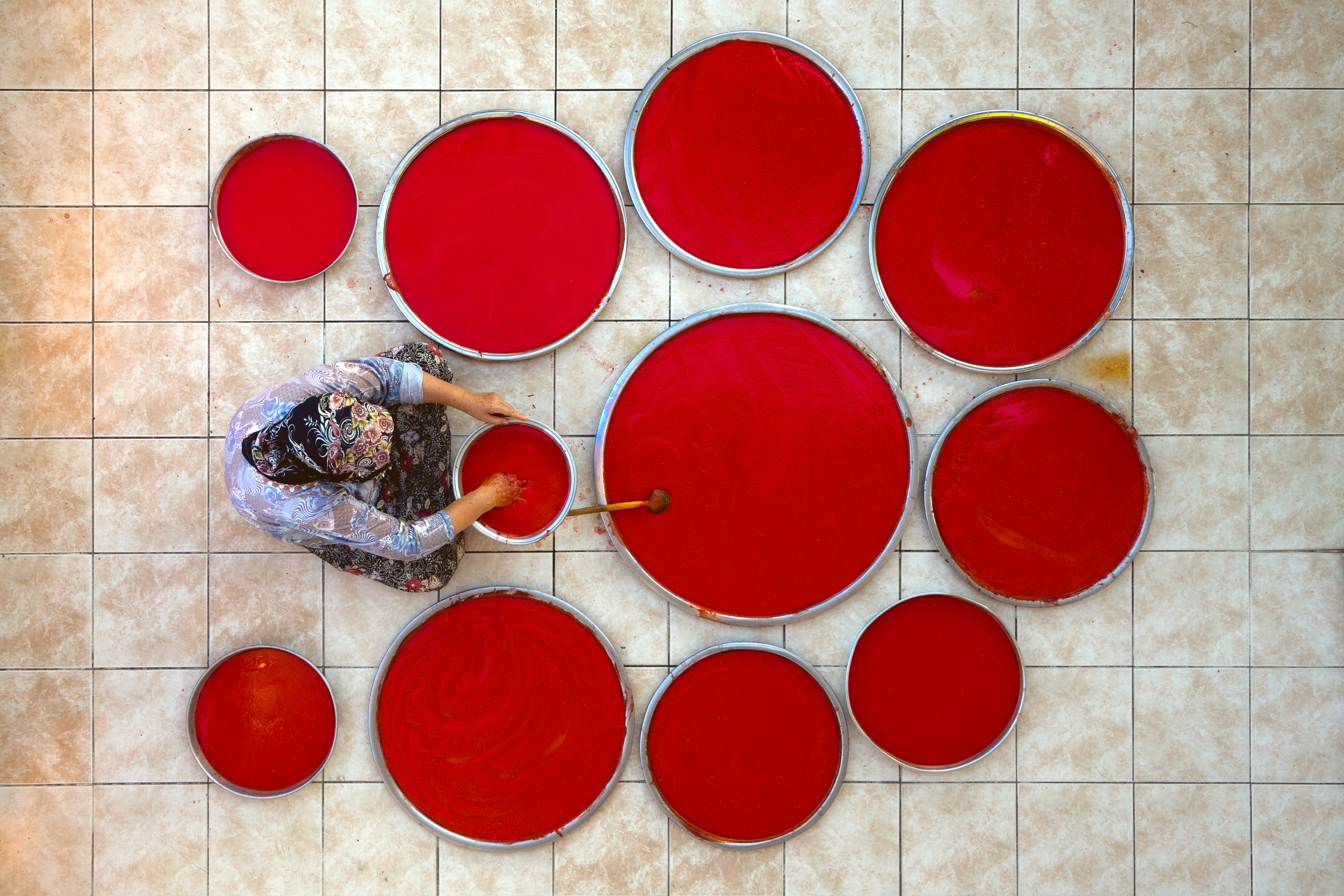
A woman prepearing home-made salça.

Biber salçası (literally "pepper paste"; also called kırmızı biber salçası, literally "red pepper paste") is made from red chili peppers or sweet long peppers and salt. The peppers' stems and seeds are removed, and then the pepper is crushed and salt added. The crushed peppers are sun-dried for six to seven days (depending on the strength of the sun) until the mixture develops intense sun-dried flavor and a pasty consistency. It is a part of the cuisine of Anatolia and is enjoyed by different ethnic groups in the region. It is used mainly for flavoring main dishes, as well as to fill pide and börek. Another common use is as a spread, typically on bread or crackers.

There are two main varieties of biber salçası:

- Acı biber salçası (literally "hot pepper paste"), made from red hot chili peppers
- Tatlı biber salçası (literally "sweet pepper paste"), made from sweet red peppers

=== Domates salçası ===
Domates salçası is tomato paste made from concentrated pureed tomatoes.

Traditional methods of making homemade Turkish tomato paste include grinding or pureeing peeled tomatoes, removing the seeds with a Turkish colander called a süzgeç and then mixing with salt. The paste is then reduced under the sun over three to four days. The paste must be stirred frequently when sun-drying to prevent spoiling. Some people reduce the puree over an open fire to speed up the process.

Commercial types of tomato salça are cooked in large factories rather than sun-dried and do not have the same intense flavour or colour.

== See also ==
- Ajika, a dip in Caucasian cuisine, based on a boiled preparation of hot red peppers, garlic, herbs and spices
- Ajvar, a relish made principally from red bell peppers, with garlic
- Chili sauce and paste
- List of condiments
- List of dips
- List of sauces
- List of spreads
- Muhammara or acuka, a hot pepper dip in Levantine cuisine
