= Ajvar =

Balkan condiment

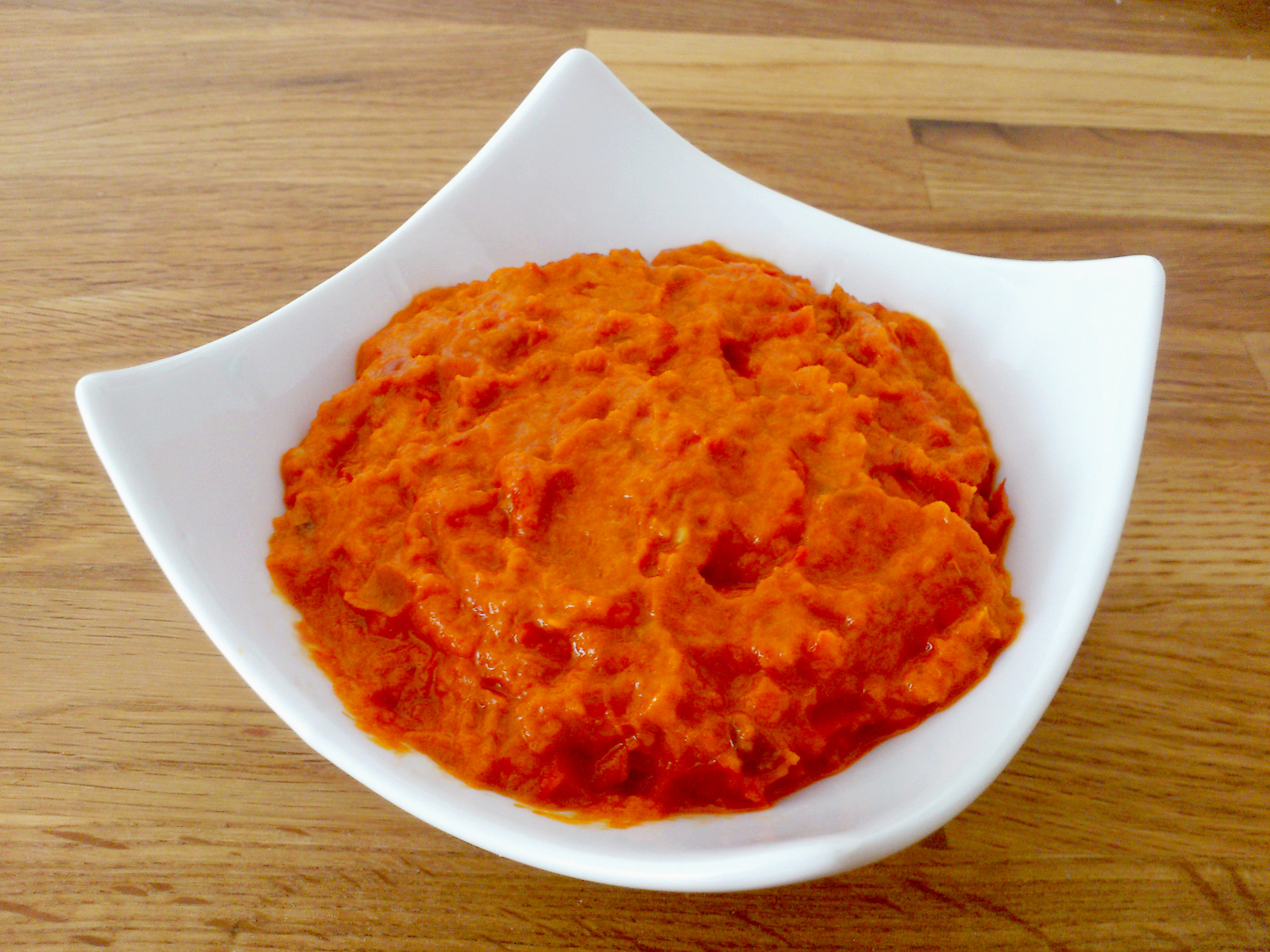
- Region or state: Balkans
- Main ingredients: Capsicum (bell peppers), oil, salt

Ajvar (Note: /ˈaɪvɑːr/ EYE-var; Serbian and Macedonian: ајвар; Serbian pronunciation: [ǎjʋaːr]; Macedonian pronunciation: [ˈajvar]; Bulgarian: айвар; Bulgarian pronunciation: [ˈajvɐr]) is a condiment made principally from sweet bell peppers and eggplants. The relish became a popular side dish throughout Yugoslavia after World War II and remains popular in Southeast Europe.

Homemade ajvar is made of roasted peppers. Depending on the capsaicin content in bell peppers and the amount of added chili peppers, it can be sweet (traditional), piquant (the most common), or very hot. Ajvar can be consumed as a bread spread or as a side dish. Ajvar has a few variations. One variation contains tomato and eggplant, and another green bell peppers and oregano.

"Homemade Leskovac Ajvar" and "Macedonian Ajvar" are registered with the World Intellectual Property Organization in order to protect their brand names.

== Etymology and origin ==
The name ajvar comes from the Turkish word havyar, which means "salted roe, caviar" and shares an etymology with "caviar", coming from the Persian word xaviyar. Before the 20th century, significant local production of caviar occurred on the Danube, with sturgeon swimming from the Black Sea up to Belgrade. Domestic ajvar, meaning "caviar", used to be a very popular dish in Belgrade homes and restaurants, but the domestic production of caviar became unsteady in the 1890s because of labor disputes. Eventually a special pepper salad was offered as a substitute in Belgrade restaurants under the name "red ajvar" (crveni ajvar) or "Serbian ajvar" (srpski ajvar).

== Preparation ==
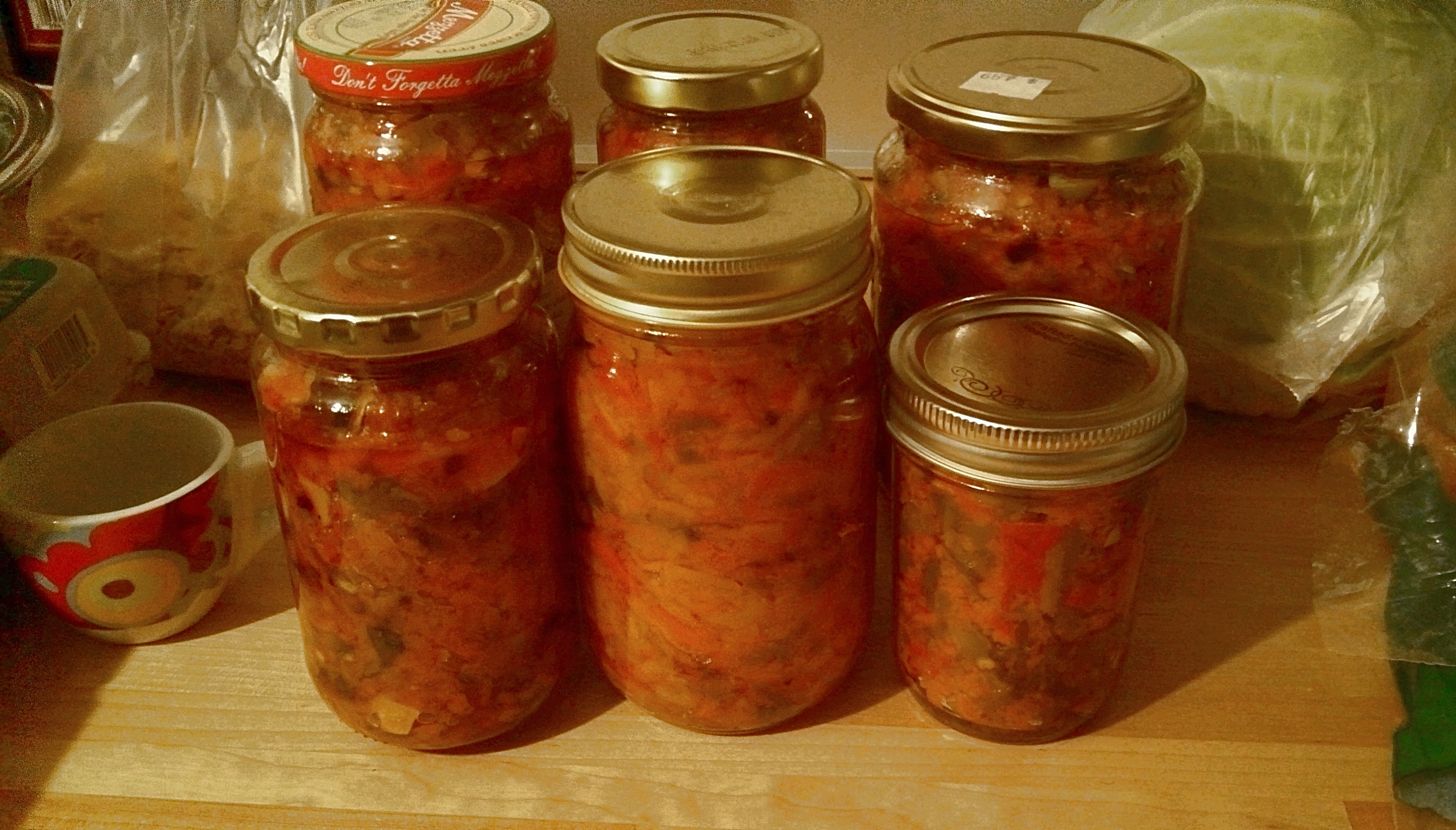
Ajvar and other pickles in a home larder

Homemade ajvar is made of peppers that are roasted, minced, and then cooked, but some industrial producers use fresh minced peppers, which are only cooked with sunflower oil afterwards, which leads to lower quality. Ajvar preparation is somewhat difficult, because it requires considerable manual labour, particularly for peeling the roasted peppers. It is traditionally prepared in mid-autumn, when peppers are most abundant, and preserved in glass jars for consumption throughout the year. Anecdotally, most households' stocks do not last until the spring, when fresh vegetables become available, so it is usually eaten as a winter food. Entire families or neighbours often gather to prepare the peppers together. The traditional cultivar of pepper used is called roga (approx. "horn"). Roga is large, red, horn-shaped and relatively easy to peel, with thick flesh. It typically ripens in late September.

To produce ajvar, fresh peppers are roasted whole on a plate above an open fire, a plate of wood in a stove, or in an oven. The baked peppers must briefly cool to allow the flesh to separate from the skin. Next, the skin is carefully peeled off and the seeds are removed. The peppers are then ground in a mill or chopped into tiny pieces (this variant is often referred to as pindjur). Finally, the resulting mash is stewed for several hours in large pots. Sunflower oil is added at this stage to condense and reduce the water, and to enhance later preservation. Salt is added at the end (sometimes alongside vinegar), and the hot mush is poured directly into sterilized glass jars, which are sealed immediately.

== Production ==
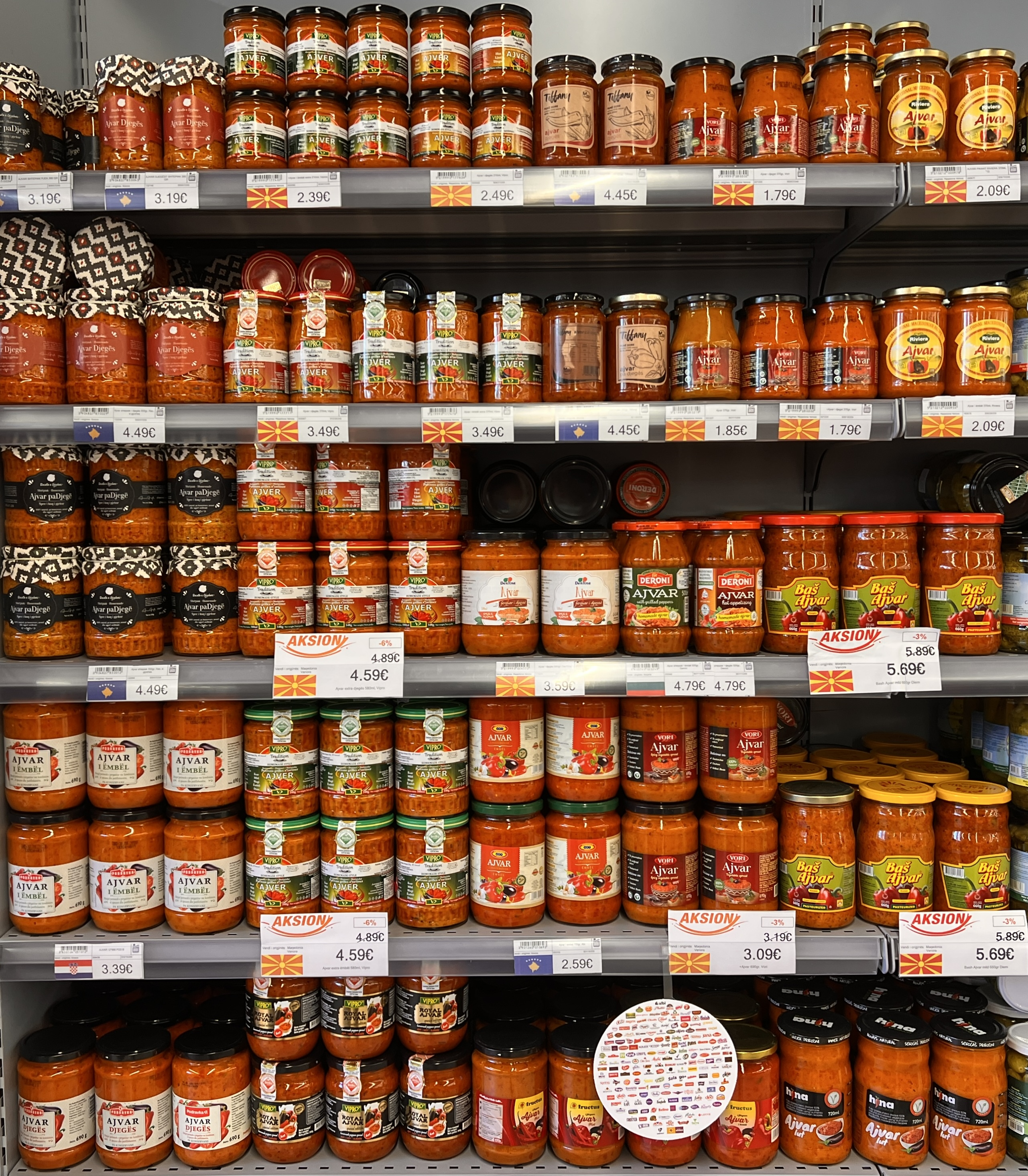
Ajvar jars in a supermarket in Gjakova, Kosovo.

Ajvar is produced in most Balkan countries, including Albania, Bosnia-Herzegovina, Croatia, North Macedonia and Serbia. It is also produced in Slovenia where it became widely known during the Yugoslav period. Serbia's reported annual production is 640 tons.

Ajvar is often included as part of zimnica (winter foods), which include pickled chili peppers, pickled tomatoes, and anything else that can be preserved in a jar just before winter.

== See also ==
- Ljutenica – Vegetable relish or chutney in Bulgarian, Macedonian, Serbian and Turkish cuisines, a similar relish in Bulgarian, Macedonian, and Serbian cuisines
- Zacuscă – Romanian-Moldovan dish, a similar relish in Romanian cuisine
- Kyopolou – Bulgarian-Turkish dish, an eggplant-based relish in Bulgarian and Turkish cuisines
- Malidzano, a similar relish in Macedonian cuisine
- Biber salçası – Paste made from peppers or tomato and salt, originating in Turkey, a Turkish paste made from red peppers alone
- Lecso – Hungarian dish, a similar Hungarian (also made in parts of Slovakia and Serbia) stewed red pepper, onion, and garlic dish
- List of spreads
- Achar – Pickled varieties of vegetable and fruit, a similar relish of Indo-European origin in South Asian cuisines
