= List of Palestinian dishes =

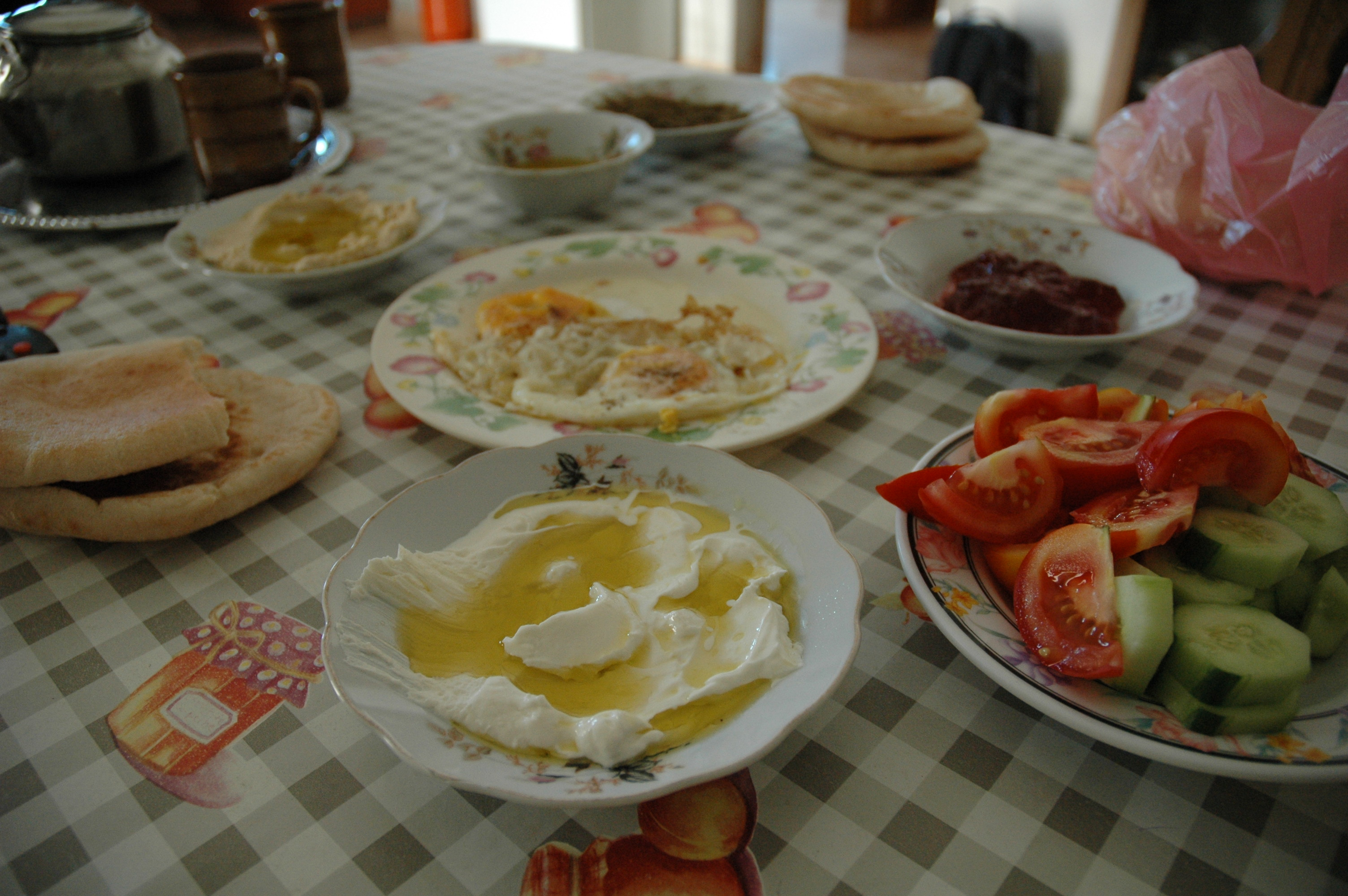
A typical Palestinian breakfast with pita, olives, tomatoes, fried egg, and labaneh

The following is a list of dishes and drinks found in Palestinian culinary tradition.

== Main dishes by region ==
=== Galilee ===
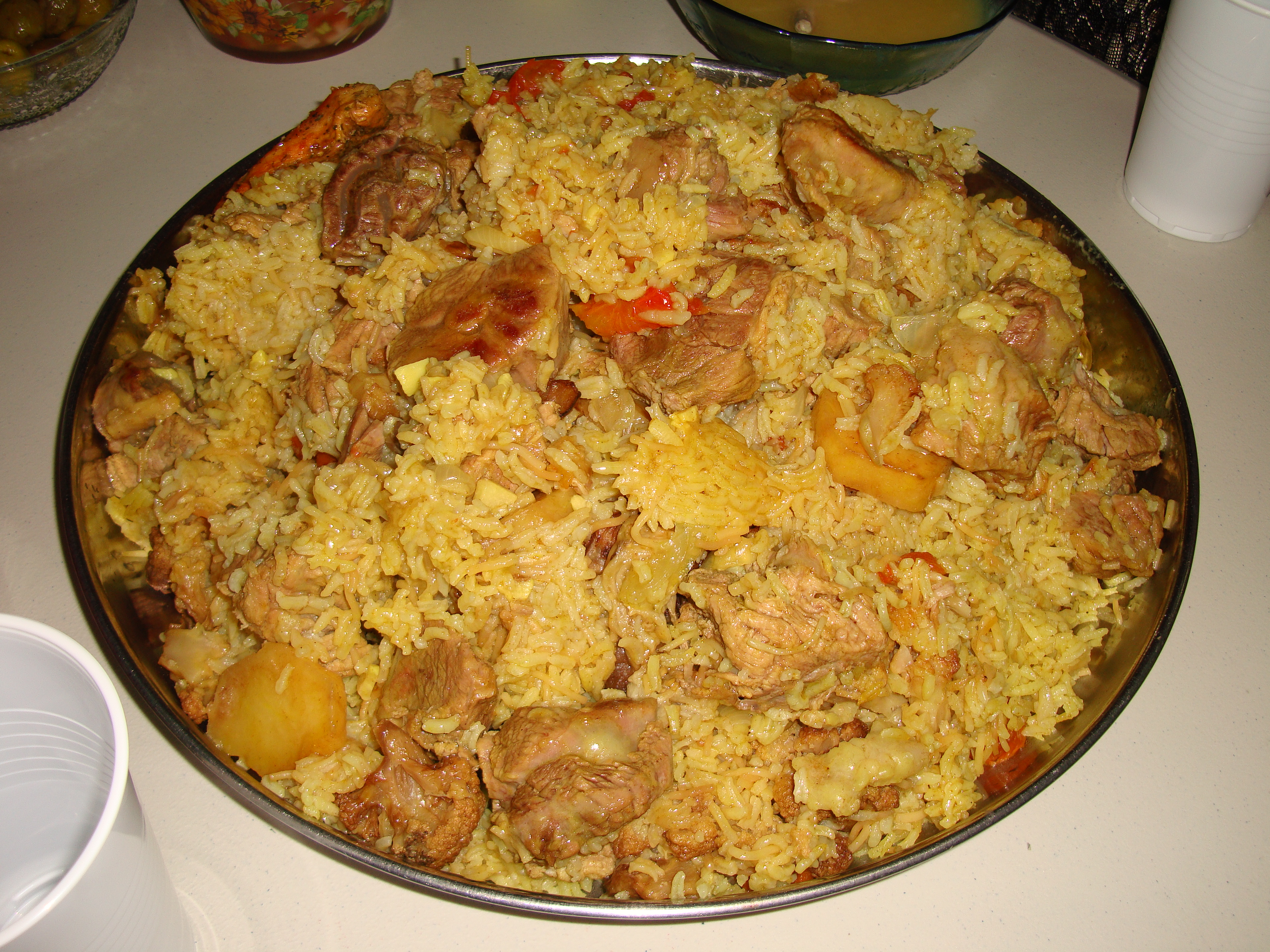
Maqluba

- Kibbeh
- Kibbee bi-siniyyeh
- Kibbeh nayyeh

=== West Bank ===
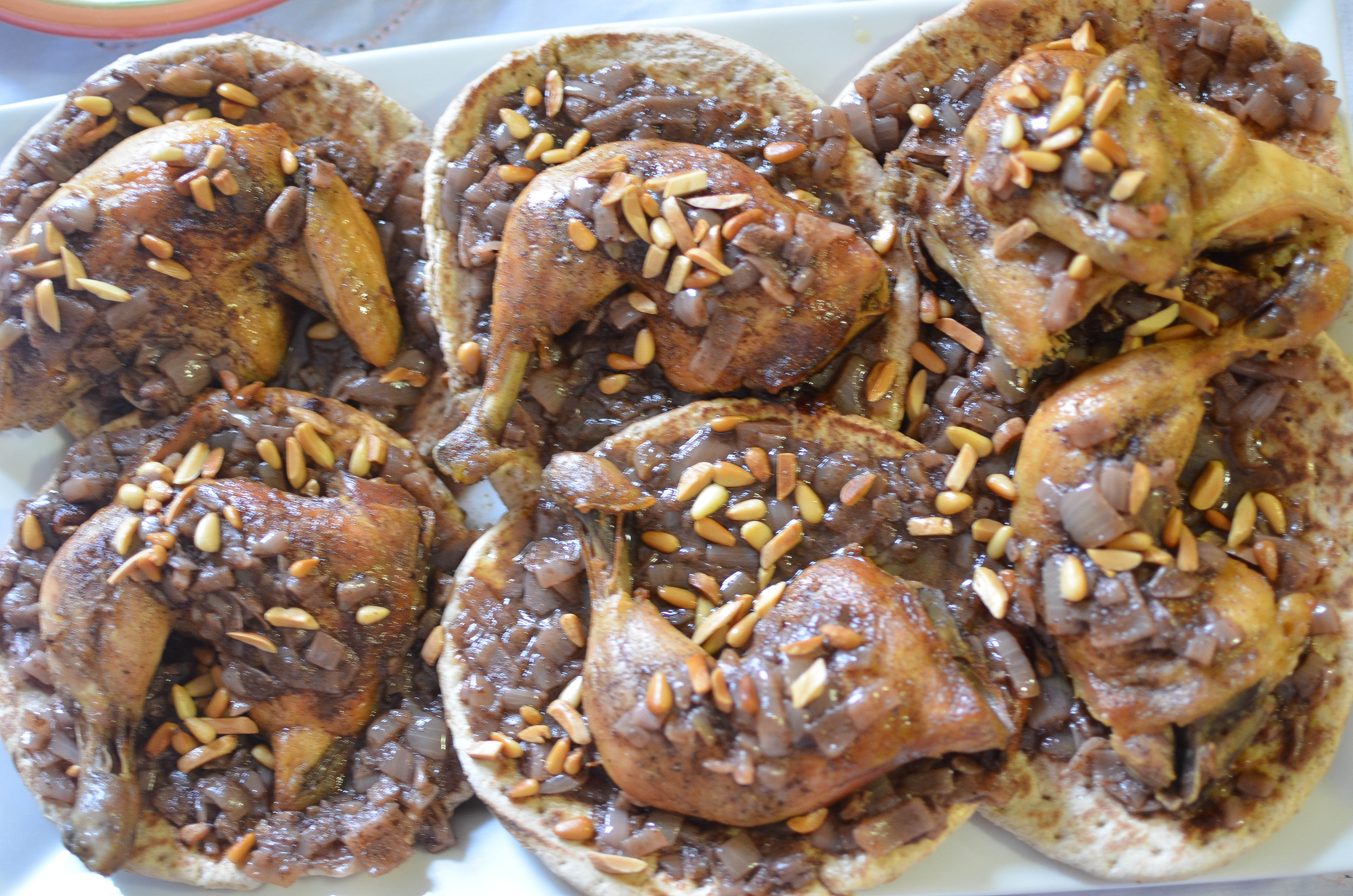
Musakhan

- Fasoulya beyda—white beans cooked in tomato sauce and served with rice
- Fasoulya khadra—green beans cooked in tomato sauce and served with rice
- Kafta b'thine—kafta balls cooked with tahini sauce and served with rice
- Qidreh or Fukharat Qidreh is rice cooked with lamb meat or chicken with chickpeas, kurkuma, saffron, garlic and cardamom. Especially famous in Hebron. Served also on feasts, weddings and funerals. Traditionally made in clay pots in traditional old style stone ovens.
- Mahshi lift—a specialty of Hebron, turnips stuffed with rice, minced lamb meat and spices, cooked in tamarind sauce
- Mandi—in the West Bank, made by cooking meat, rice and vegetables in an underground oven, as in other Arab States
- Mansaf—lamb cooked in a sauce of fermented dried yogurt and served with rice or bulgur
- Zarb—same as mandi, but cooked under high pressure in an airtight oven, and usually rice is substituted by bread (influenced by Jordanians)

=== Jerusalem ===
- Jraysha (جريشة)—a slow-cooked porridge of wheat berries, meat, and often kishk or yogurt, served for wedding ceremonies. Particularly associated with Silwan, Beit Safafa, and Lifta.

=== Gaza ===
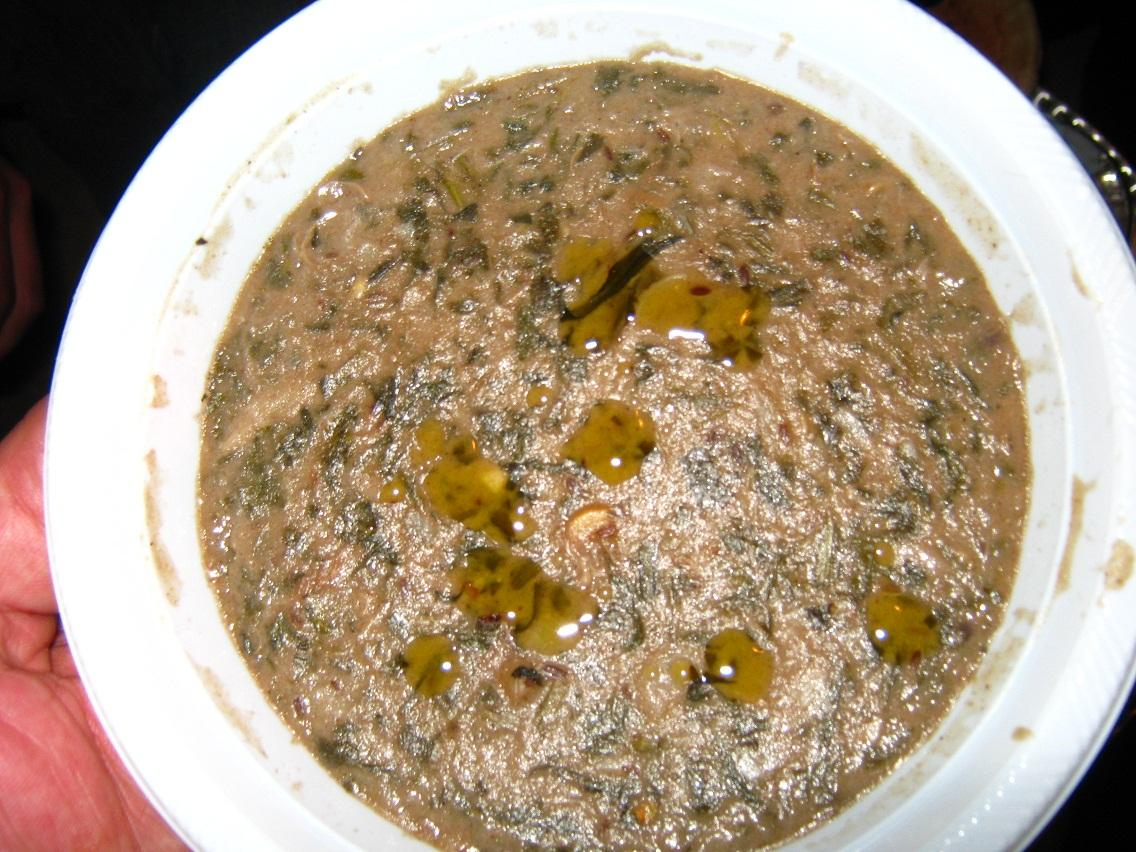
Sumaghiyyeh

- Fatit 'ajir—roasted watermelon with unleavened bread and chopped vegetables. The watermelon itself has been used as a Palestinian symbol
- Fukharit 'adas—lentil flavored with red peppers, dill, garlic and cumin
- Qidra—rice and meat pieces cooked with cloves, garlic and cardamom
- Rummaniyeh—a mix of eggplant, pomegranate seeds, tahina, red peppers and garlic
- Sumaghiyyeh—beef and chickpea stew flavored with sumac, tahina and red peppers
- Zibdieh—a clay-pot dish of shrimp baked in a stew of olive oil, garlic, hot peppers, and peeled tomatoes
- Dagga Gazawiyyah— a spicy, tangy, citrus-y tomato and dill salsa
- Shatta—a simple fermented hot sauce

=== National ===
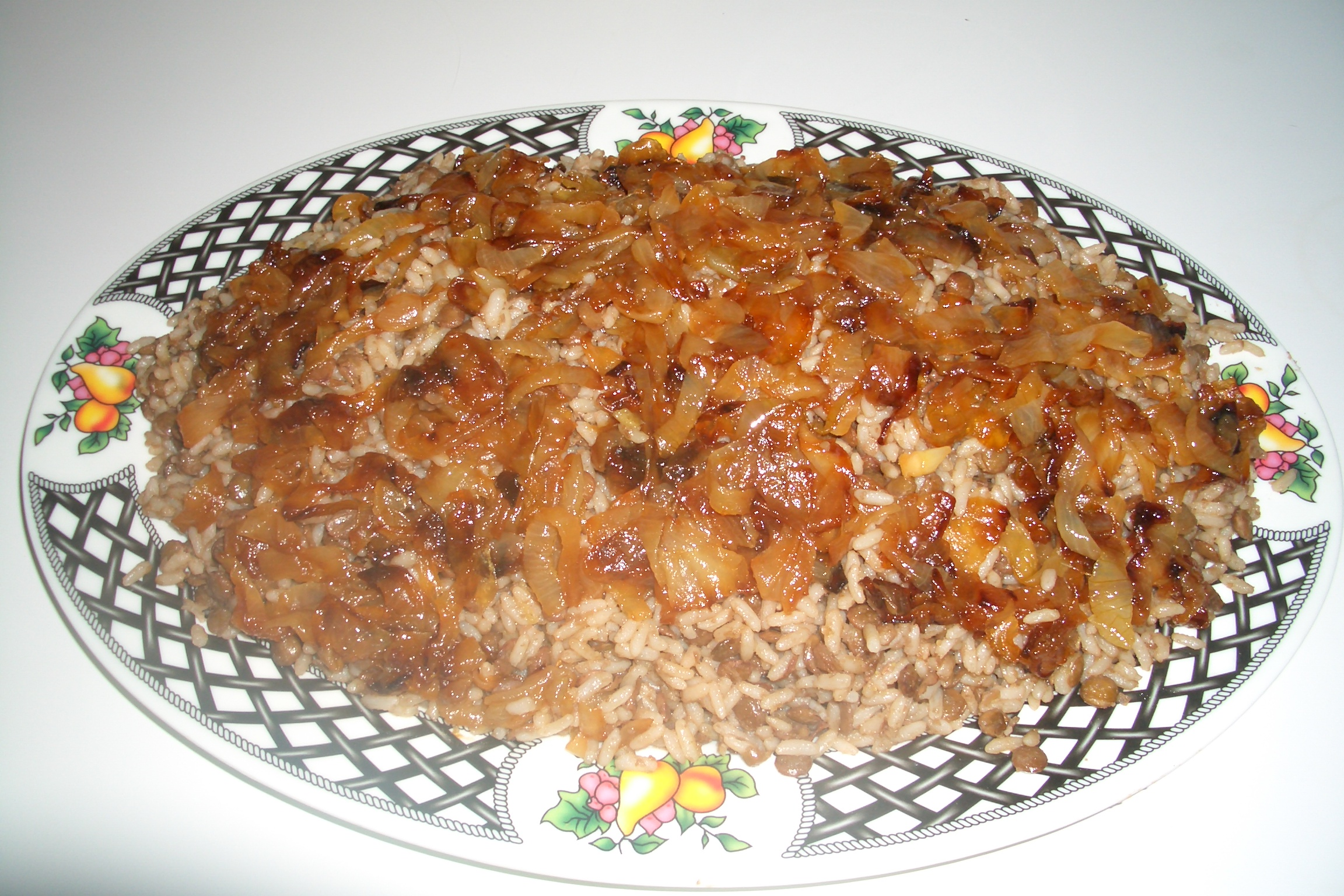
Mujaddara

- Ari'ih—rice and minced meat stuffed in pumpkins
- Bamia-okra and tomato stew
- Bissara-made with corchorus olitorius and fava beans
- Falafel—fried chickpeas, spice and parsley ball or patty
- Fatta—dishes that include bread crumbs
- Hummus—a dip, spread, or savory dish made from cooked, mashed chickpeas blended with tahini, lemon juice, and garlic
- Kousa mahshi—rice and minced meat stuffed in zucchini cooked in a garlicky tomato broth
- Maftoul—large couscous-like balls, garbanzo beans and chicken pieces cooked in chicken broth
- Malfuf—rice and minced meat rolled in cabbage leaves
- Maqluba—an "upside-down" dish, made with fried vegetables, meat (lamb), rice and eggplant
- Mloukiyyeh—Corchorus stew
- Mujaddara—lentil and bulgur dish
- Musakhan—large taboon breads with chicken, red onions, pine nuts, sumac, and spices; a modern version is musakhan rolls, where the spices, chicken, sumac, toasted pine nuts, and red onion are rolled in saj bread
- Shishbarak-dumplings cooked in yogurt
- Shawarma—a dish consisting of meat cut into thin slices, stacked in a cone-like shape, and roasted on a slowly-turning vertical rotisserie or spit; with a spread of toum (garlic paste) wrapped in saj bread
- Shurbat freekeh—green wheat soup, usually with chicken
- Waraq al-'anib—rice and minced meats rolled in grape leaves

== Side dishes ==
=== Salads and dips ===
- Arabic salad—made of tomato, cucumber, onion, olive oil and lemon juice, Palestinian variant called Salatat al-bundura ("tomato salad")
- Hummus—ground chickpeas with tahina and olive oil
- Fattoush—mixed leaf-vegetable salad with deep-fried pita bread pieces and sumac
- Malfouf salad—typically consists of shredded cabbage, lemon juice, olive oil, garlic, salt and dried mint
- Mfarakeh—a dish made of potato, egg, ghee, cumin powder, salt and pepper, in addition chopped coriander leaf for garnish
- Msabbaha-chickpeas "swimming" in tahini sauce
- Makdous-cured eggplant stuffed with nuts and garlic
- Mutabbel—spicier version of baba ghanoush
- Qalayet bandora—a simple dish of tomatoes, onions, hot peppers, olive oil, and salt served for breakfast, lunch, or dinner
- Tabbouleh—parsley and bulgur salad with diced tomatoes, onions and lemon juice
- Tahini—condiment made from toasted ground hulled sesame seeds
- Qudsiyeh-ful medames served on top of hummus
- Mthawamet Bandora—a dip made from roasted tomatoes, jameed, and topped with garlic toasted in olive oil.
- Baqdunsieh (Arabic: بقدونسيىة)—a dip made from finely chopped parsley, lemon juice, tahini, and crushed garlic.
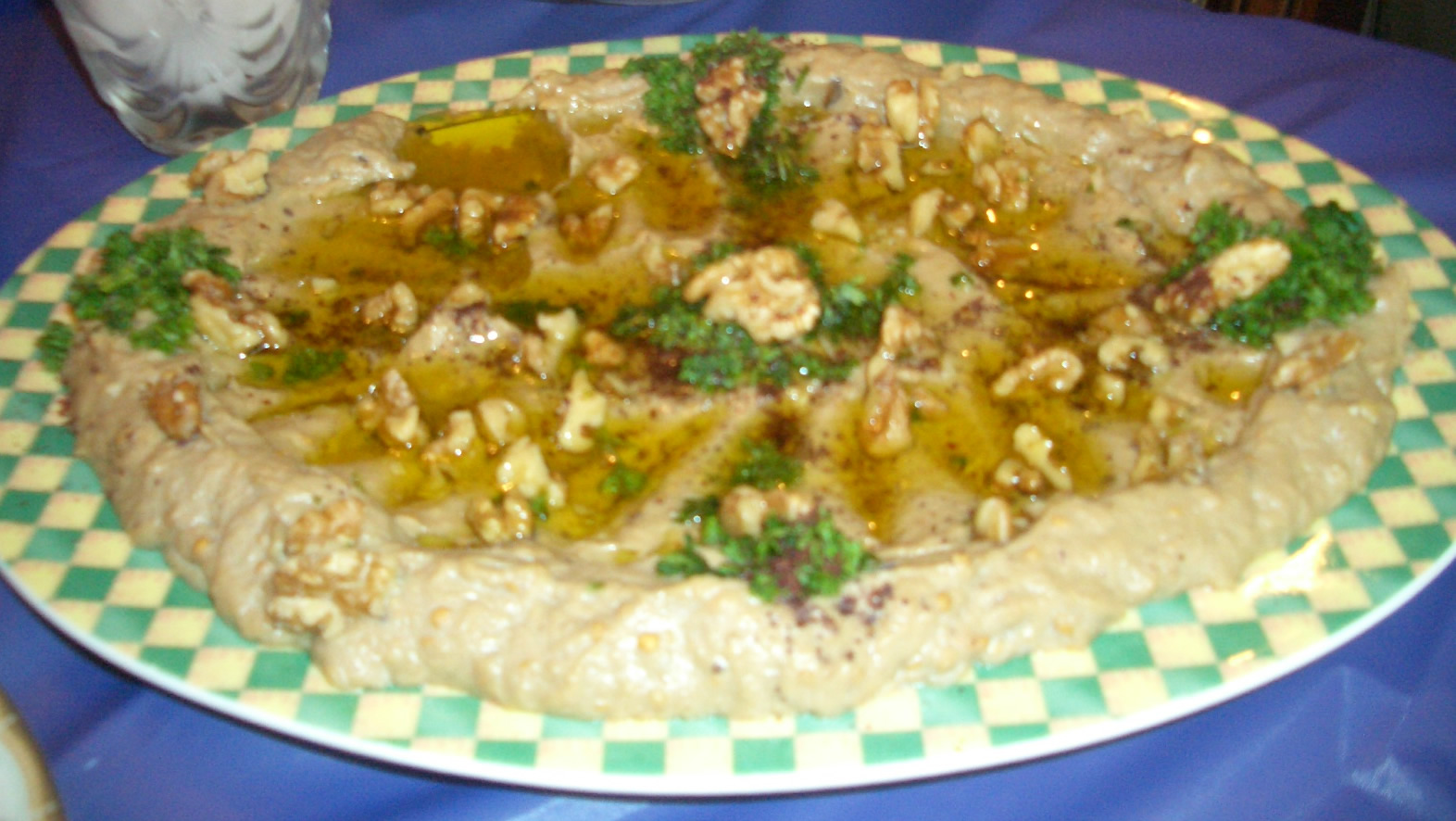
Baba ghanoush

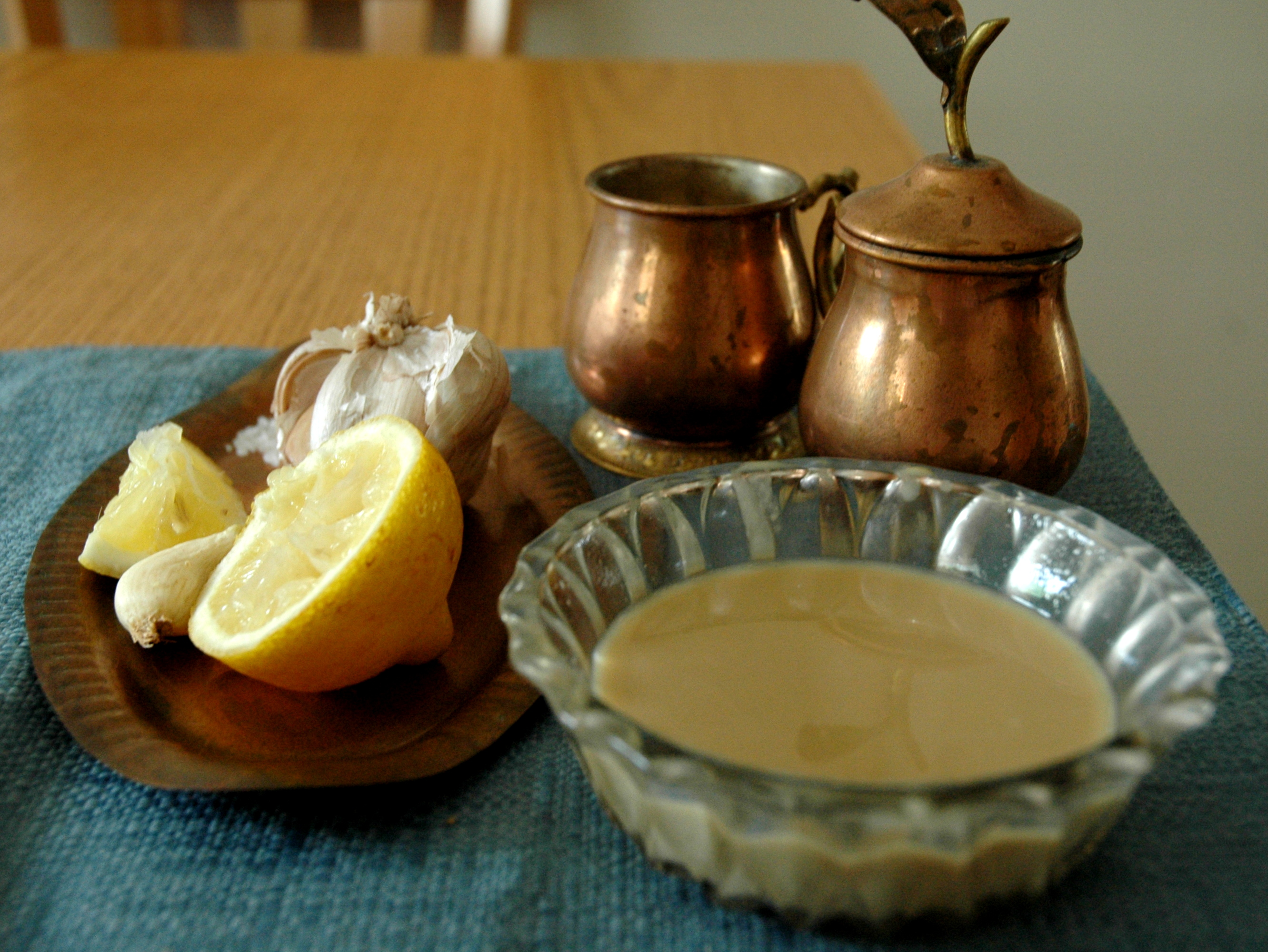
Tahini with lemon and garlic

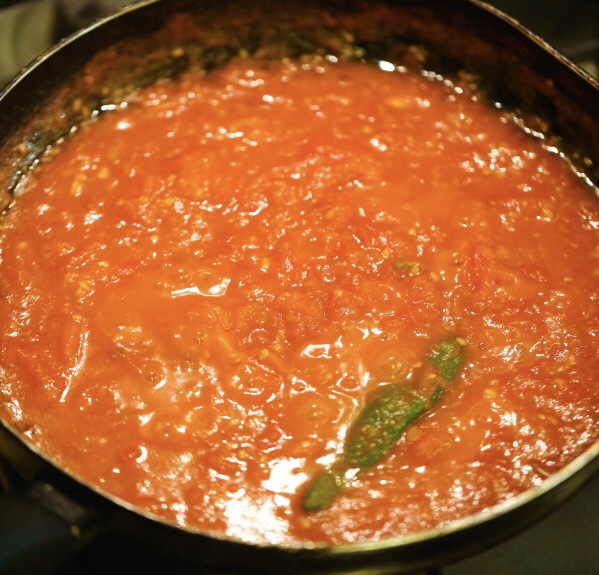
Galayet bandora

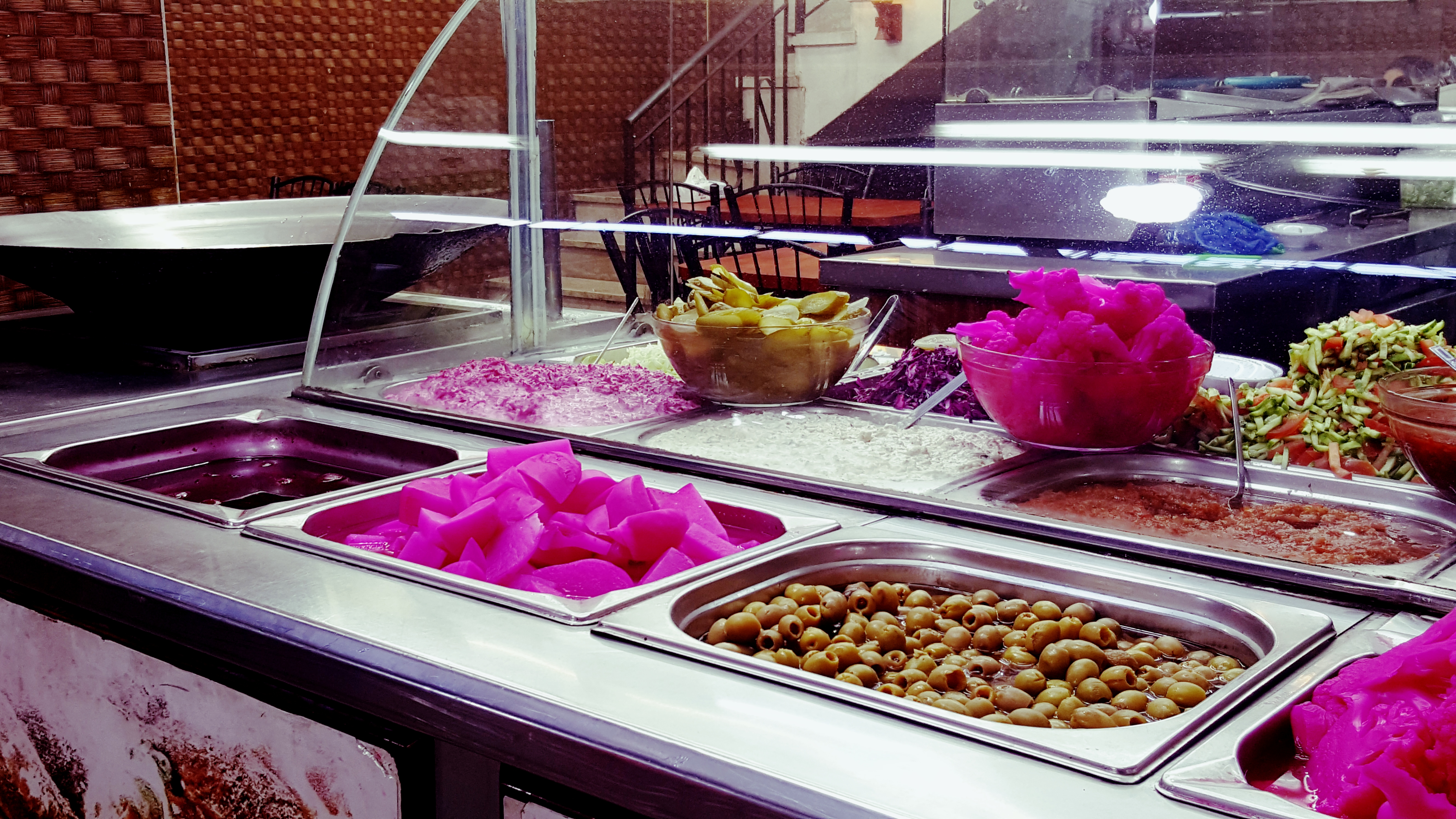
Salads, pickles, and condiments at a falafel shop in Jerusalem

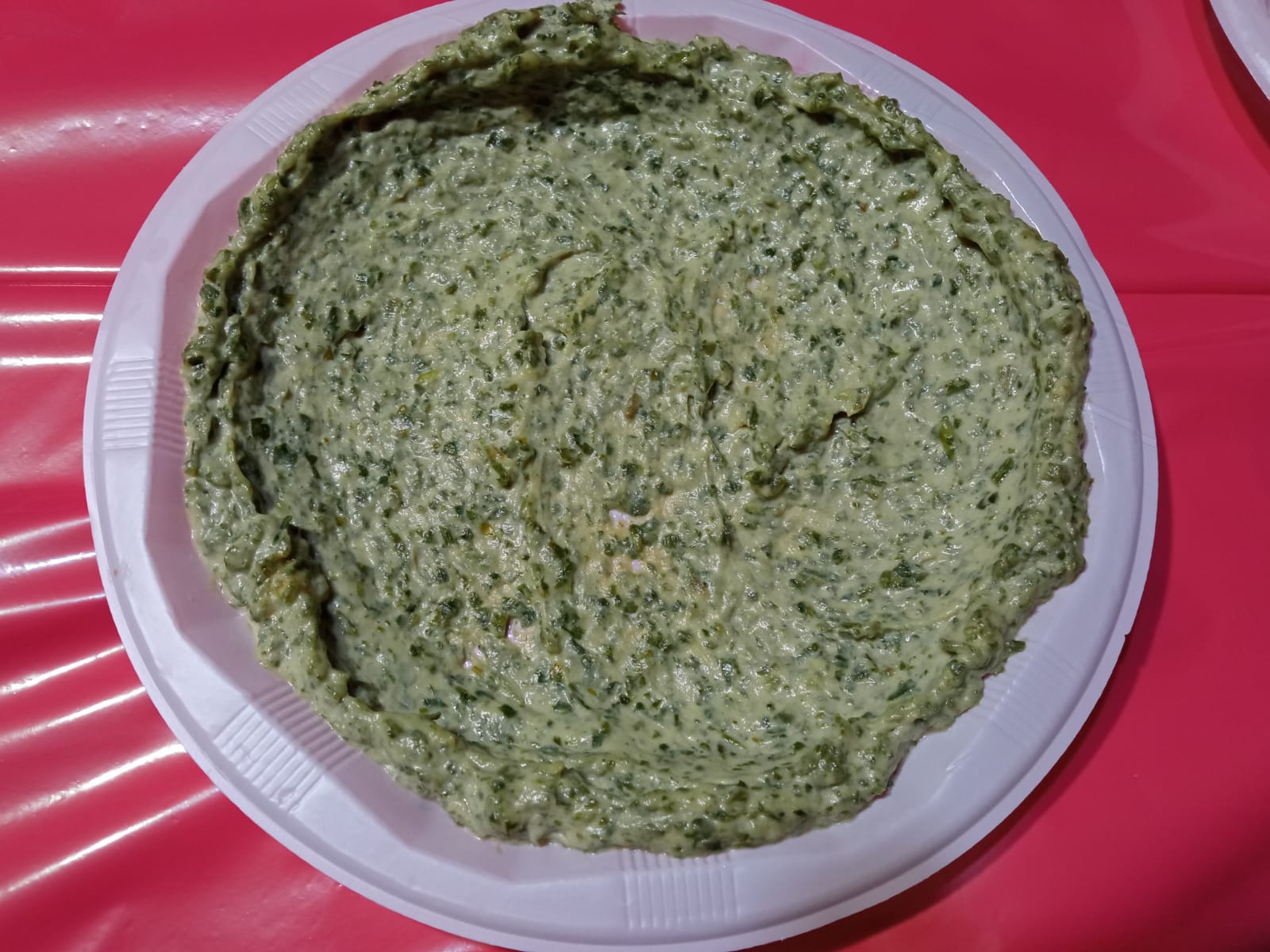
Palestinian Baqdunsieh

=== Cheeses and yogurts ===
- Akkawi—a white brine cheese originating from the city of Akka/Acre
- Halloumi—cheese with a high melting point which can easily be fried or grilled, making it a popular meat substitute
- Jibneh Arabieh—has a mild taste similar to feta but less salty
- Jameed—a hard dry laban made from ewe or goat's milk, kept in a fine woven cheesecloth to make a thick yogurt; typically served with Mansaf
- Kashk—made from drained yogurt or drained sour milk by shaping it and letting it dry
- Labaneh—tangy, smooth, creamy yogurt cheese; served with a drizzle of olive oil and sometimes zaatar
- Nabulsi—Used in nabulsi cheese fatayirs, and can be eaten fresh as salty table cheese or fried in oil
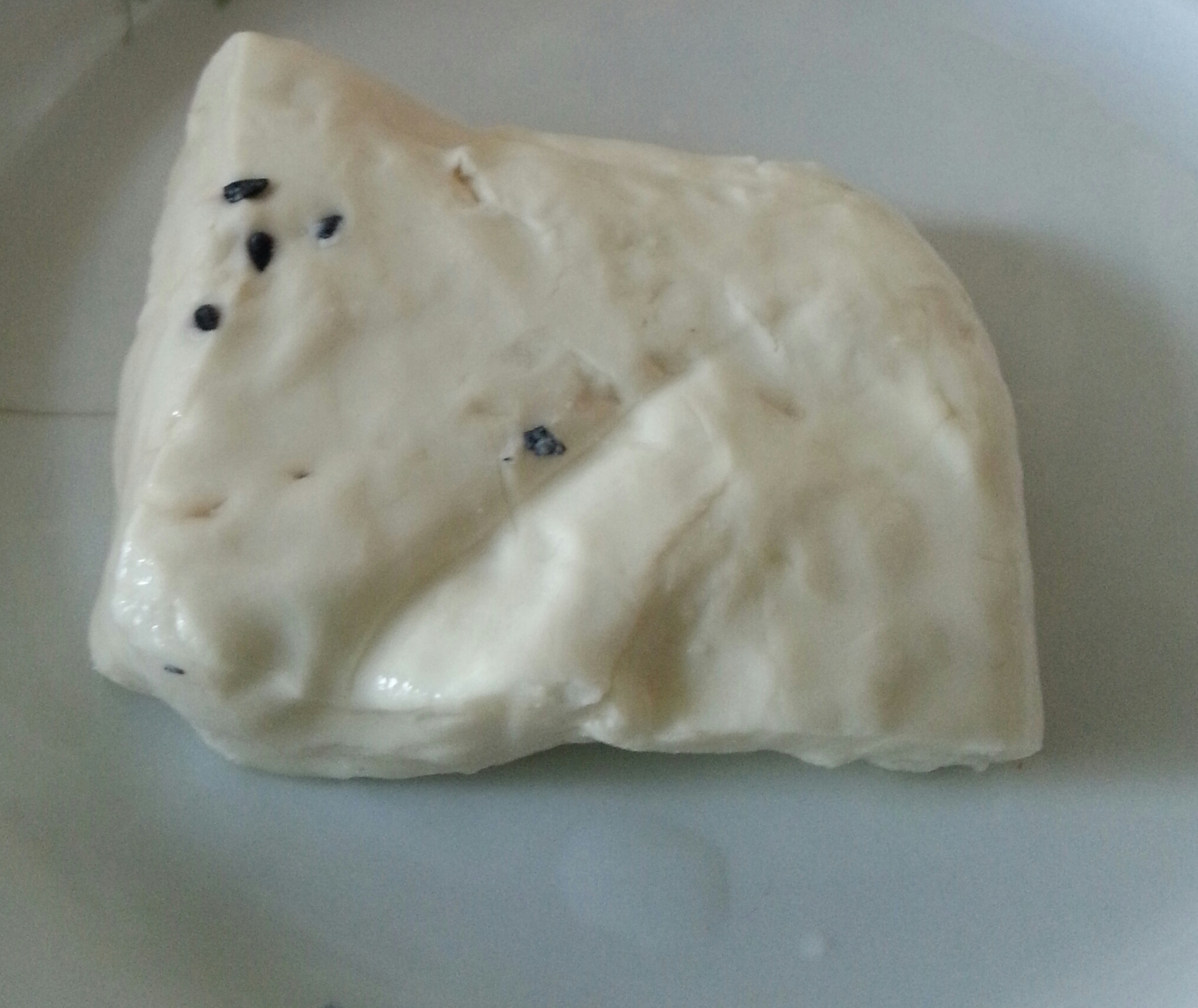
Nabulsi cheese

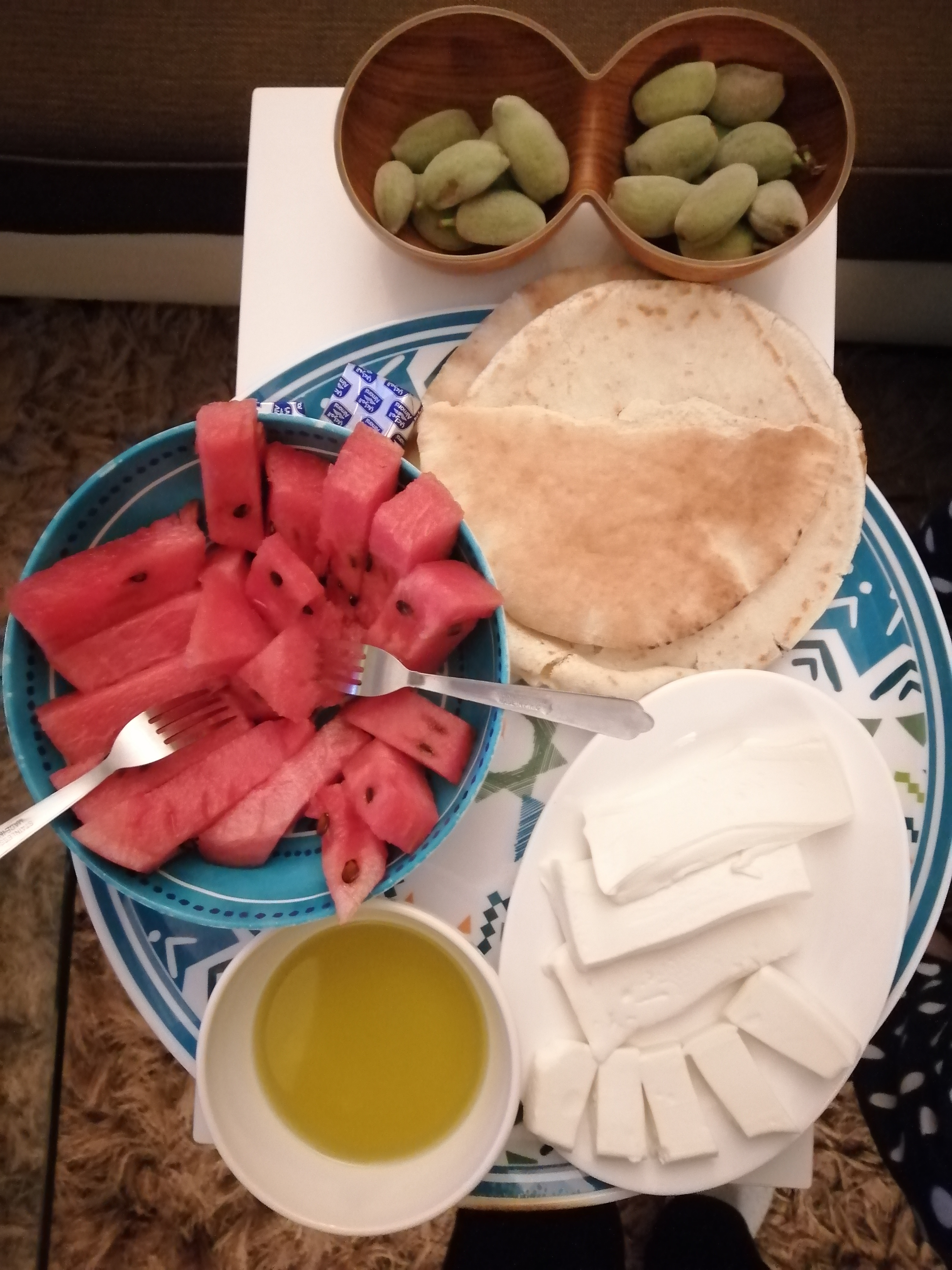
Watermelon is traditionally served with Akkawi or Nabulsi as table cheeses

== Breads ==
- Ka'ak—may refer to a bread commonly consumed throughout the Near East that is made in a large ring-shape and is covered with sesame seeds
- Ka'ak al-Quds-named after Jerusalem, bread rings covered in sesame
- Khubz—may refer to any type of bread. Breads popular in Arab countries include "pocket" pita bread and tandoor bread.
- Pita—a family of yeast-leavened round flatbreads baked from wheat flour, common in the Mediterranean, Middle East, and neighboring areas
- Markook—unleavened and usually made with only flour, water, and salt, and after being rested and divided into round portions, flattened and spread across a round cushion until it is thin then flipped onto the saj
- Taboon—an important part of Palestinian cuisine, traditionally baked on a bed of small hot stones a taboon oven
- Maltout—a flatbread flavored with olive oil. Commonly associated with rural Palestinian cuisine.
- Musaffan (مسفن)-an olive oil flavored sweet bread made to celebrate the olive harvest.
- Karadeesh (كراديش)-bread of corn flour or barley flour
- Arshalleh (قرشلة)-a spiced rusk to be eaten with tea
- musaffan (مسَفَّن)-olive oil flavored sweetbread made to celebrate the olive harvest season
- Muttabaq zaatar (Arabic: مطبق زعتر) is made by folding dough over fresh za'atar (Origanum syriacum) leaves, onions and sumac, which is then baked and topped with olive oil.

=== Bread dishes ===
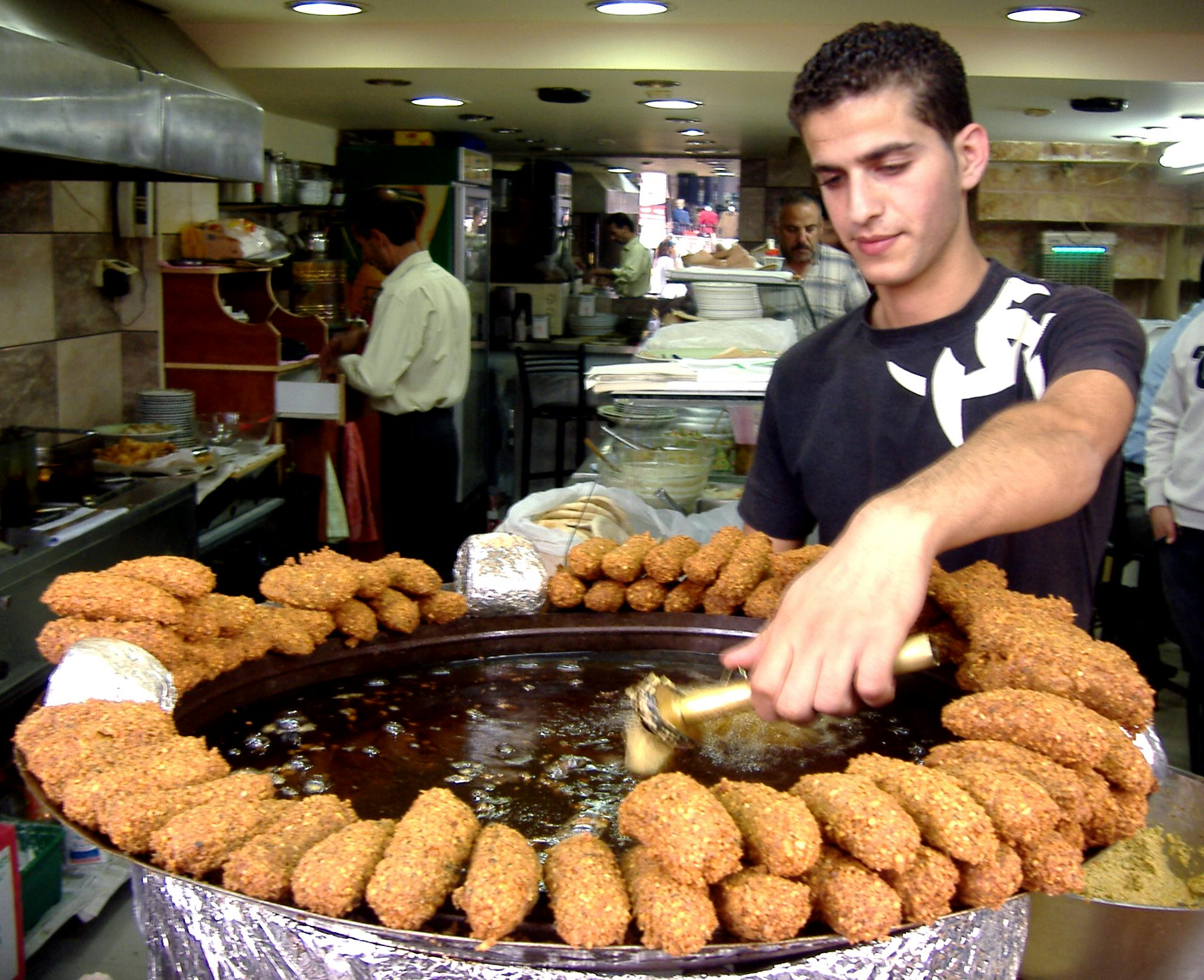
A Palestinian man from Ramallah using an aleb falafel while frying falafel

- Fatayer—a meat pie that can be stuffed with spinach, or cheese such as feta or Akkawi, and za'atar
- Manakish—taboon bread topped with za'atar and olive oil
- Sambusak—fried dough balls stuffed with meat, pine nuts and onions
- Sfiha—flatbread topped with beef and red peppers
- Shawarma—pita bread roll of meat, tahini and various vegetables
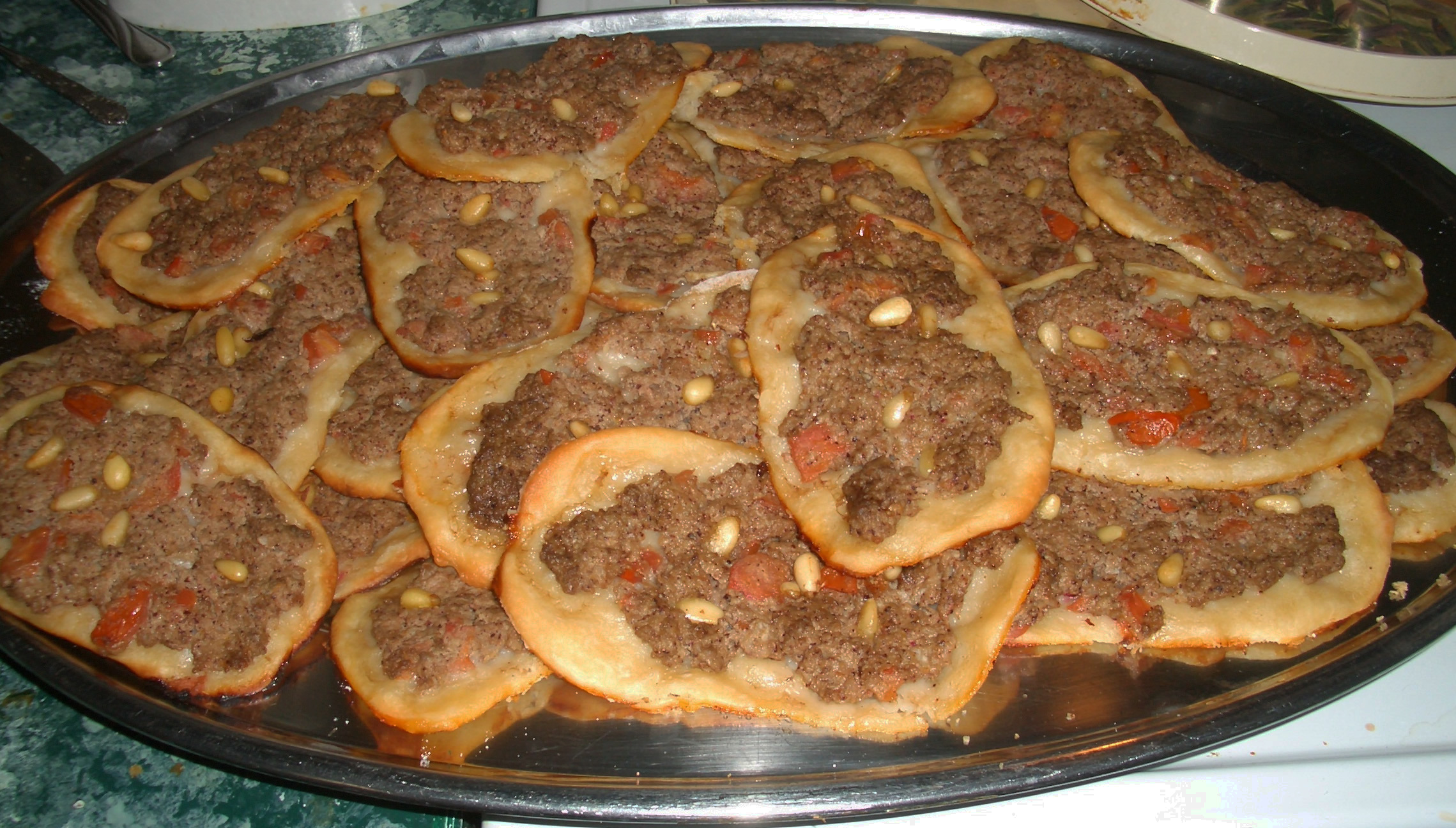
Sfiha

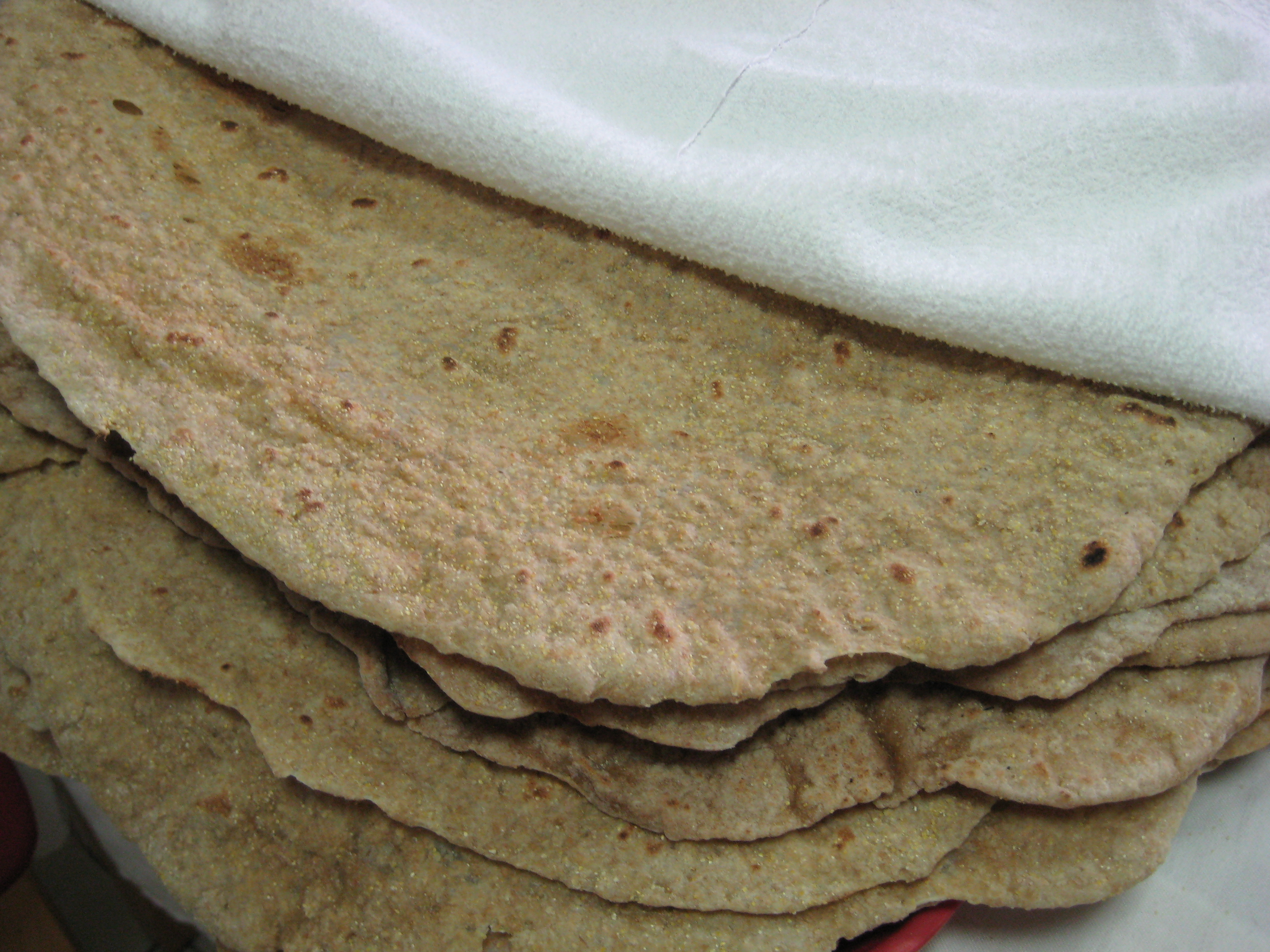
Markook

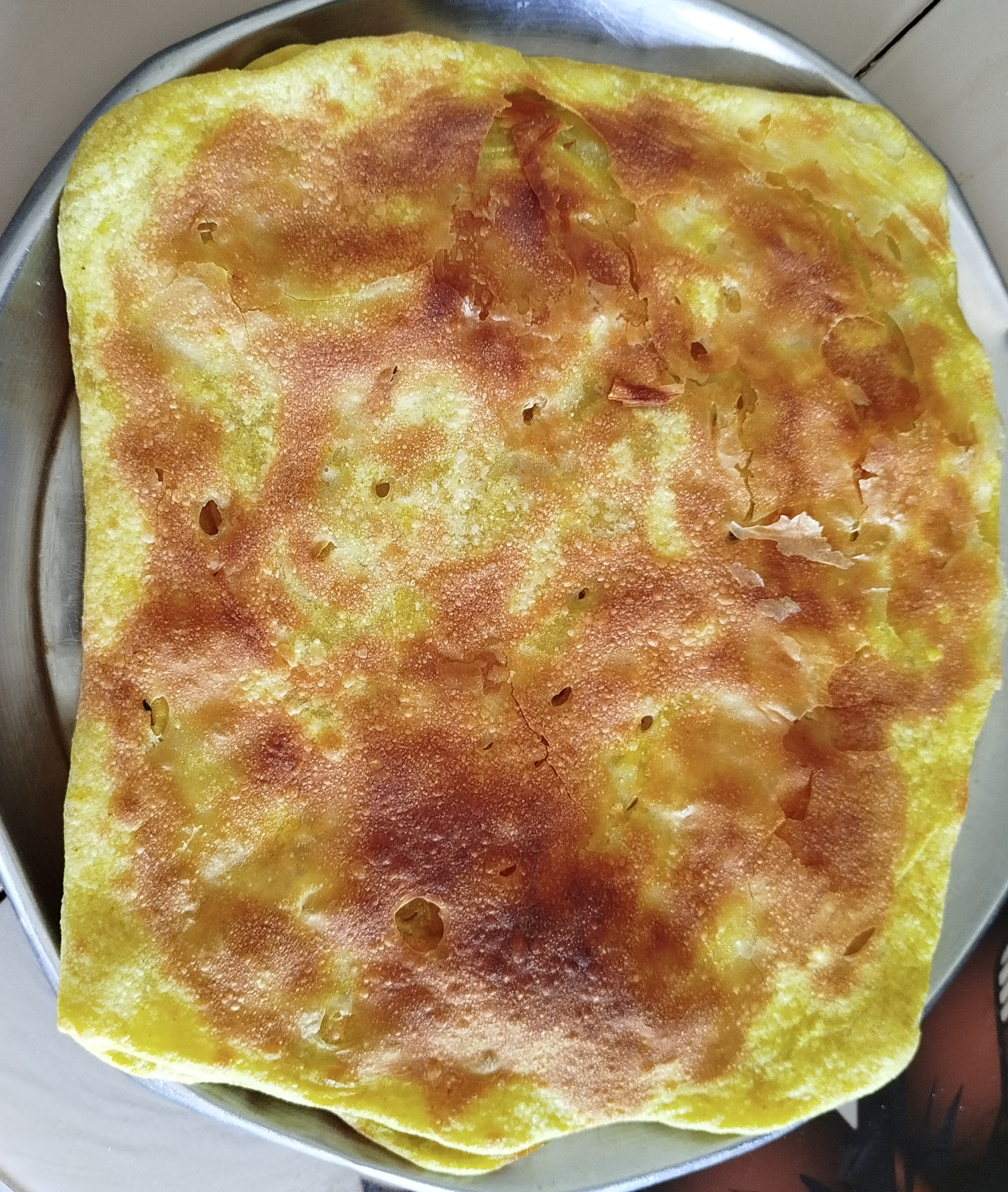
Maltout bread, made with olive oil

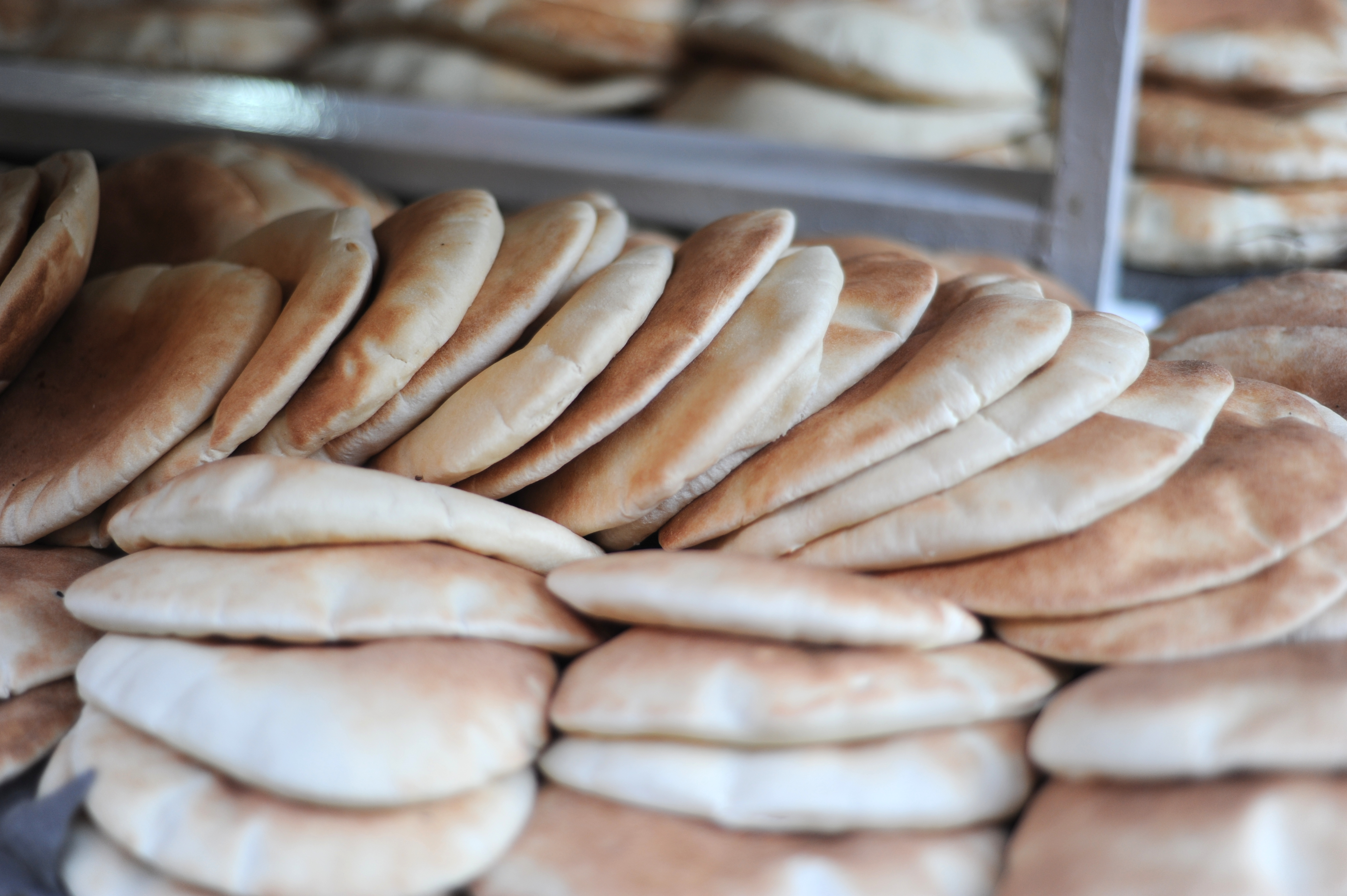
Pita in Nablus

== Condiments ==
- Bahārāt (بَهَارَات)—Arabic word for "spices" (plural of bahār "spice")
- Duqqa (دُقَّة)—a condiment consisting of a mixture of herbs, nuts (usually hazelnut), and spices
- Qizḥa (قزحة)—made from crushed nigella seeds, the paste has a sharp, bitter taste with slight tones of sweetness
- Sumac (السماق)—ground into a reddish-purple powder used as a spice in Middle-Eastern cuisine to add a tart, lemony taste to salads or meat
- Za'atar (زَعْتَر)—a spice mixture that includes the herb along with toasted sesame seeds, dried sumac, and often salt and other spices
- Qadha (قدحة, or taqliya تقلية)-garlic and optionally spices (mainly coriander) fried in olive oil or samneh, typically added to a stew
- Qatir (قطر)-sugar syrup used in many sweets
- Tatbeeleh khadra (تتبيلة خضرا)-a sauce of green chiles and garlic added to hummus and other dips.
- Tahini sauce-a sauce of tahini, lemons, parsley and garlic

== Beverages ==
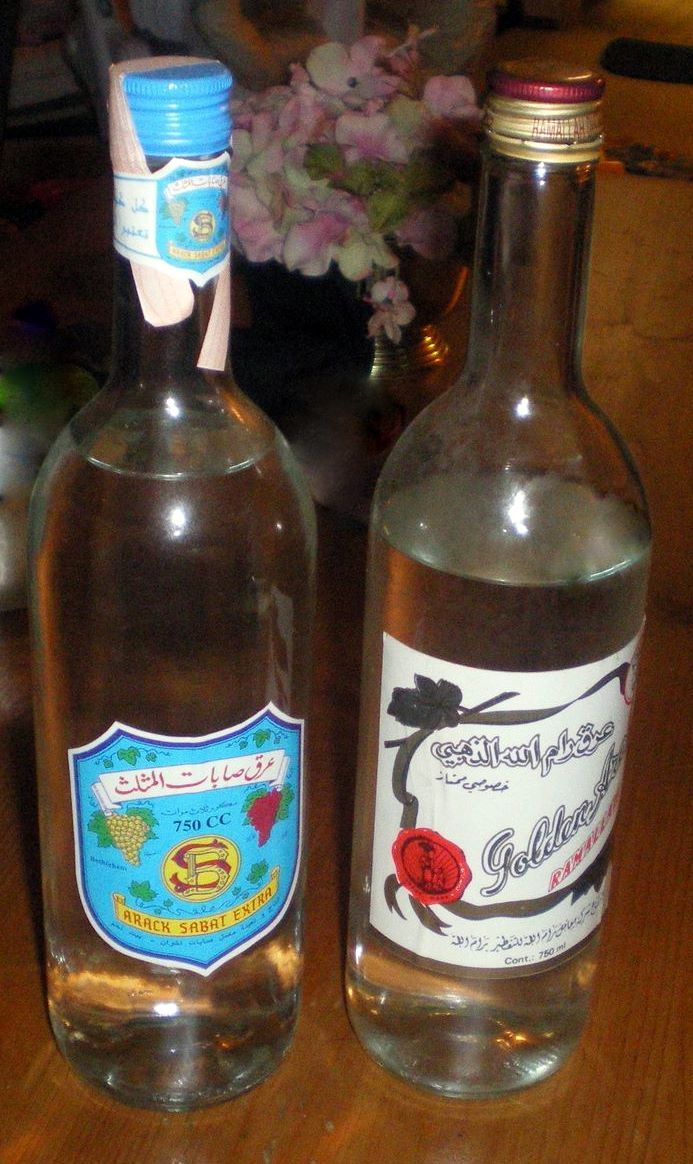
Palestinian arak

- Arabic coffee—a version of the brewed coffee of Coffea arabica (بُنّ) beans
- Arabic tea-tea flavored with mint, sage, or other aromatic herbs
- Arak (ﻋﺮﻕ)—Anise-flavored alcoholic beverage
- Ḥelba (حلبه)—Fenugreek beverage
- Kharroub (خَرُّوبٌ)—carob juice
- Lemonade (عصير الليمون)—a sweetened lemon-flavoured beverage
- Erq sous (عرق سوس)-a licorice root based drink
- Qamar Eddine (قمر الدين)—an apricot juice or nectar beverage that is typically consumed during the Muslim holy month of Ramadan
- Saḥlab (سَحْلَب)—boiled milk with starch made from nearly-extinct orchids, covered with smashed coconut and cinnamon
- Tamar Al-Hindi (تمر هندي)—a refreshing cold sweet-and-sour Ramadan drink prepared with tamarind, sugar and water
- Turkish coffee (قهوة تركية)—a style of coffee prepared using very finely ground coffee beans without filtering

== Sweets ==
=== National ===
- Awameh (عوامة)—Arabic for "swimmer", a Levantine pastry similar to doughnut holes, made of deep-fried dough, soaked in sugar syrup or honey
- Baklava (البقلاوة)—sweet pastry made of layers of filo
- Ghoriba (غريبة)—a shortbread biscuit, usually made with ground almonds
- Ḥalawa (حلوى)—primary ingredients are tahini and sugar, glucose or honey
- Harīsa (هريسة)—a traditional semolina sweet cake drenched in rose water
- Saniyit Hulba (صينية حلبة)—a semolina and fenugreek cake soaked in qatir, similar to basbousa
- Ma'amoul (معمول)—shortbread pastries filled with dates, pistachios or walnuts
- Muhallebi (مهلبية)—a milk pudding, basic ingredients are rice, sugar, rice flour and milk
- Qaṭayef (قطايف)—sweet dumpling filled with cream or nuts
- She'reya bil sukkar (شعيرية بالسكر)—sweetened vermicelli
- Warbat (وربات)—a sweet pastry similar to baklava, with layers of thin phyllo dough filled with custard
- Swar el-sit (سوار الست)-a round variety of baklava

=== Hebron ===
- Dahdah (دحدح)-a date filled semolina cake, similar to ma'amoul
- Malban (ملبن)—a fruit leather made from grape juice, semolina, and nigella seeds, popular in Hebron
- Khabeesa (خبيصة)—a grape juice and semolina pudding traditionally made in Hebron, nuts and seeds are also added to it

=== Jerusalem ===
- Maarouk (معروك)-A turmeric-flavored sweet bread filled with dates
- Meshabek (مشبك)—A deep fried sweet pastry made to celebrate Mawlid
- Mutabbaq (مطبق)-a pan fried pastry made by enveloping a cheese or nut filling with thin phyllo dough

=== Nablus ===
- Knafeh (كُنافة)—cheese pastry soaked in sweet sugar-based syrup made in Palestine
- Kullaj (كلاج)—a dessert made from thin dough, shaped into layers or rolls with walnut, Nabulsi cheese, or pistachio as stuffing, which gets cooked in ghee and then topped with qatir syrup
- Tamriyeh (تمرية)—a deep fried sweet made from unleavened, folded dough and filled with a semolina and butter filling
- Qizha pie (كعكة قزحة)—a semolina cake like hareeseh flavored with qizha
- Madlouqa (مدلوقة)-a variety of knafeh served with qishta and pistachios
- Zalabiyeh (زلابية)- a fried triangular flatbread that is served with candied pumpkins.
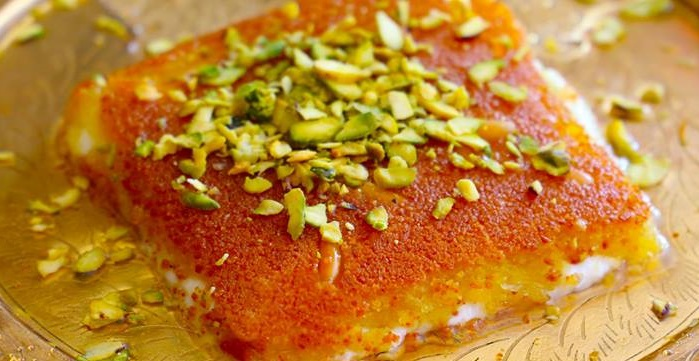
Knafeh

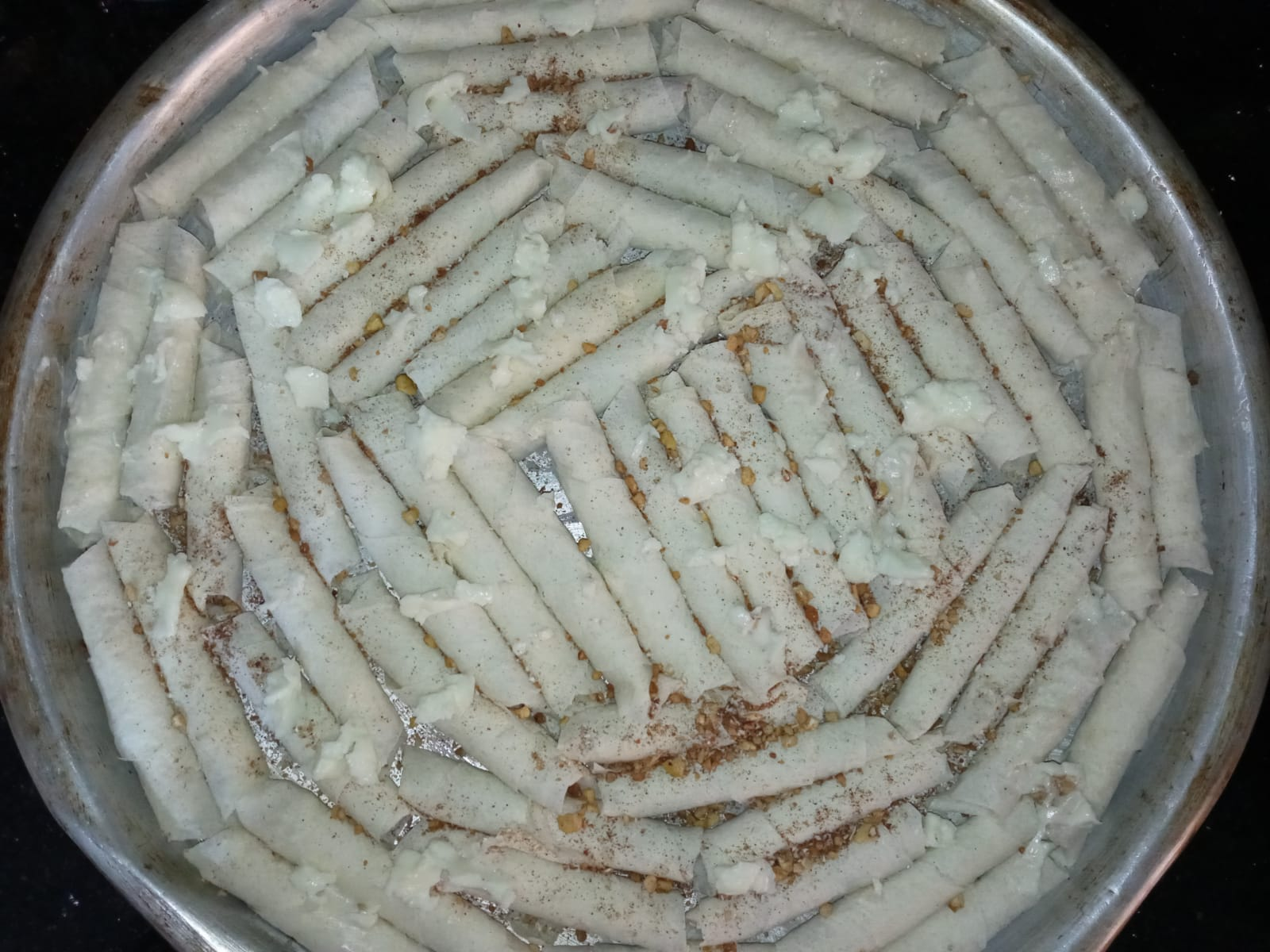
Kullaj with walnuts, not yet baked

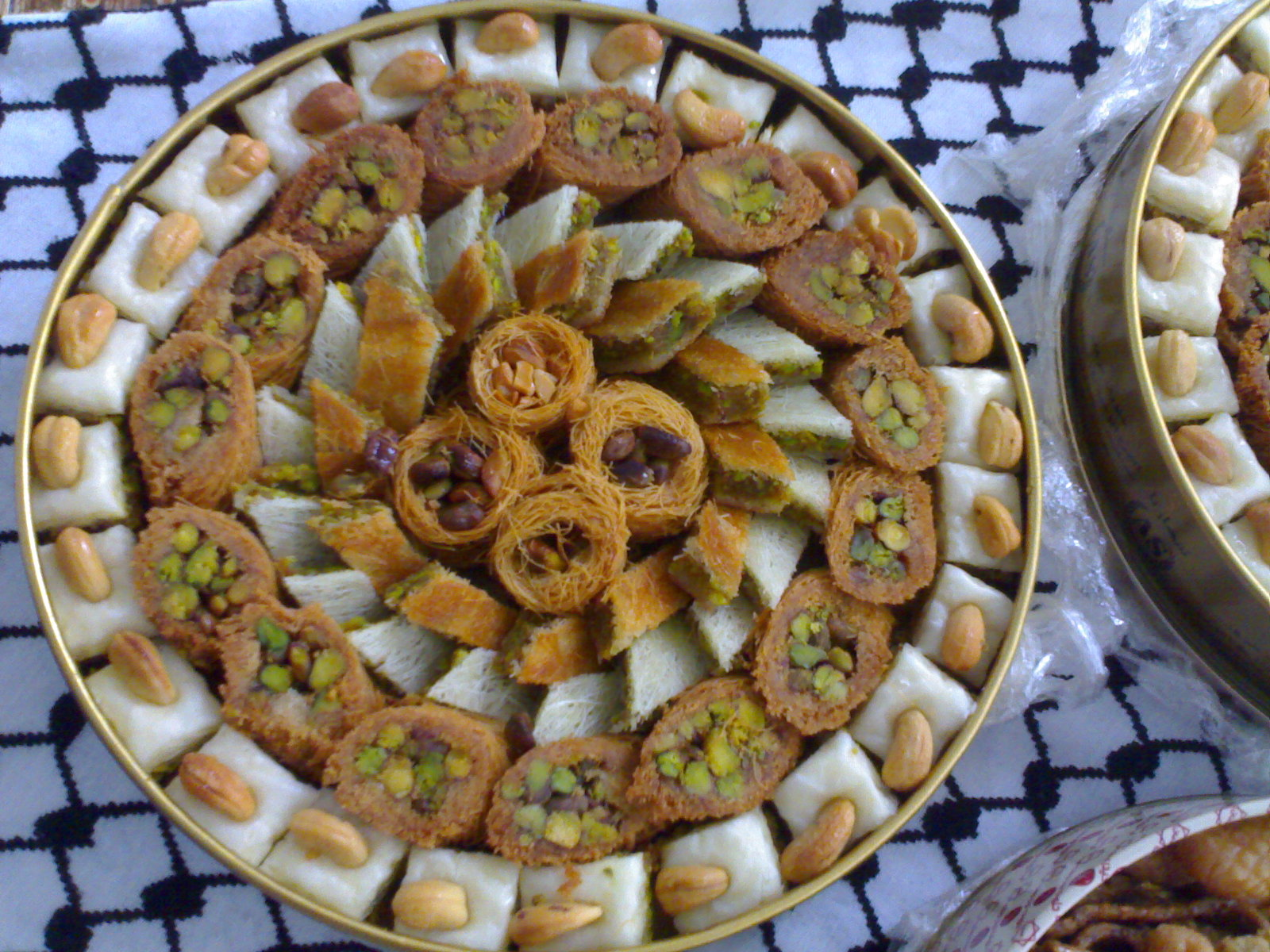
Baklawa from Nablus

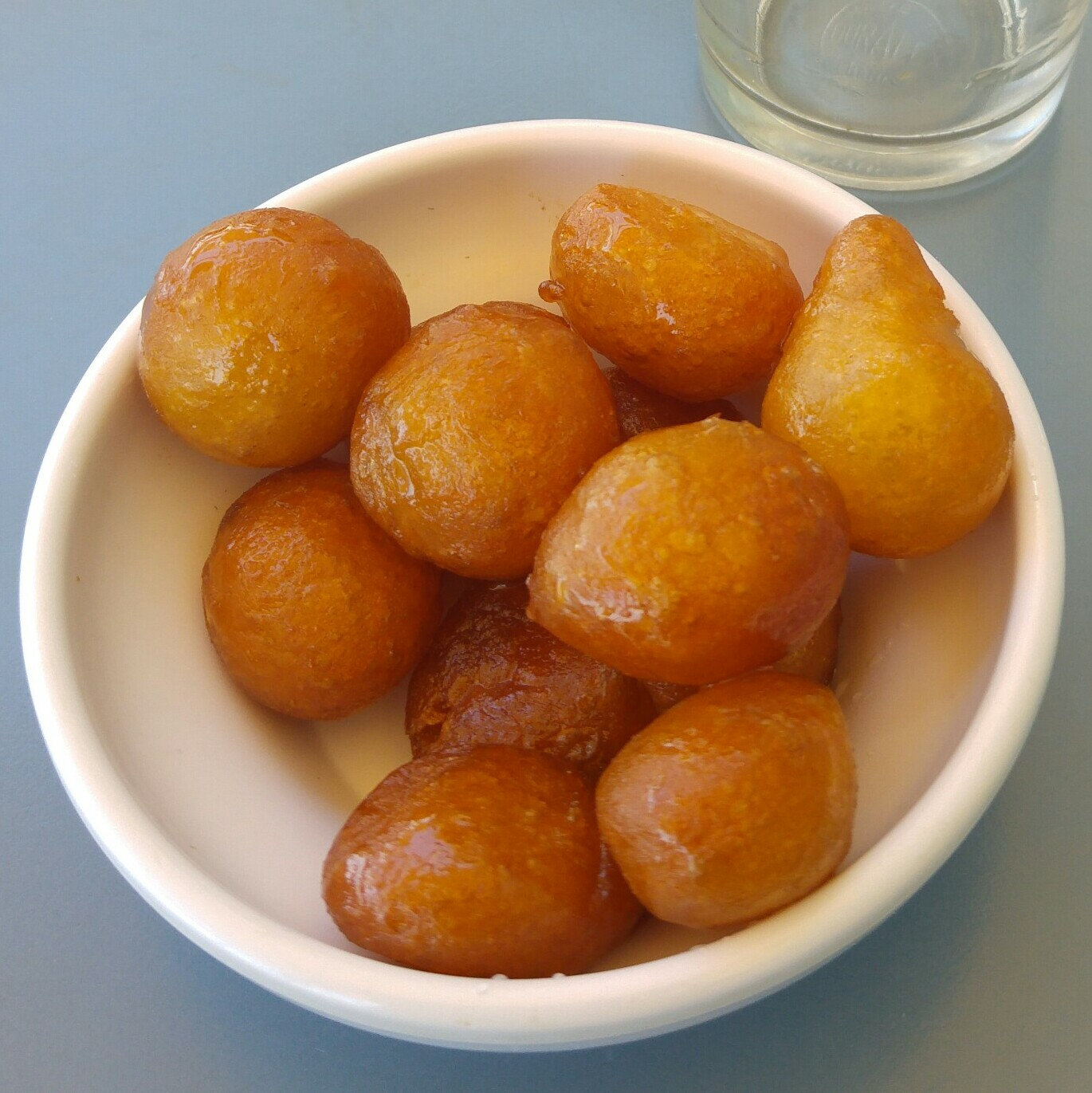
Awameh

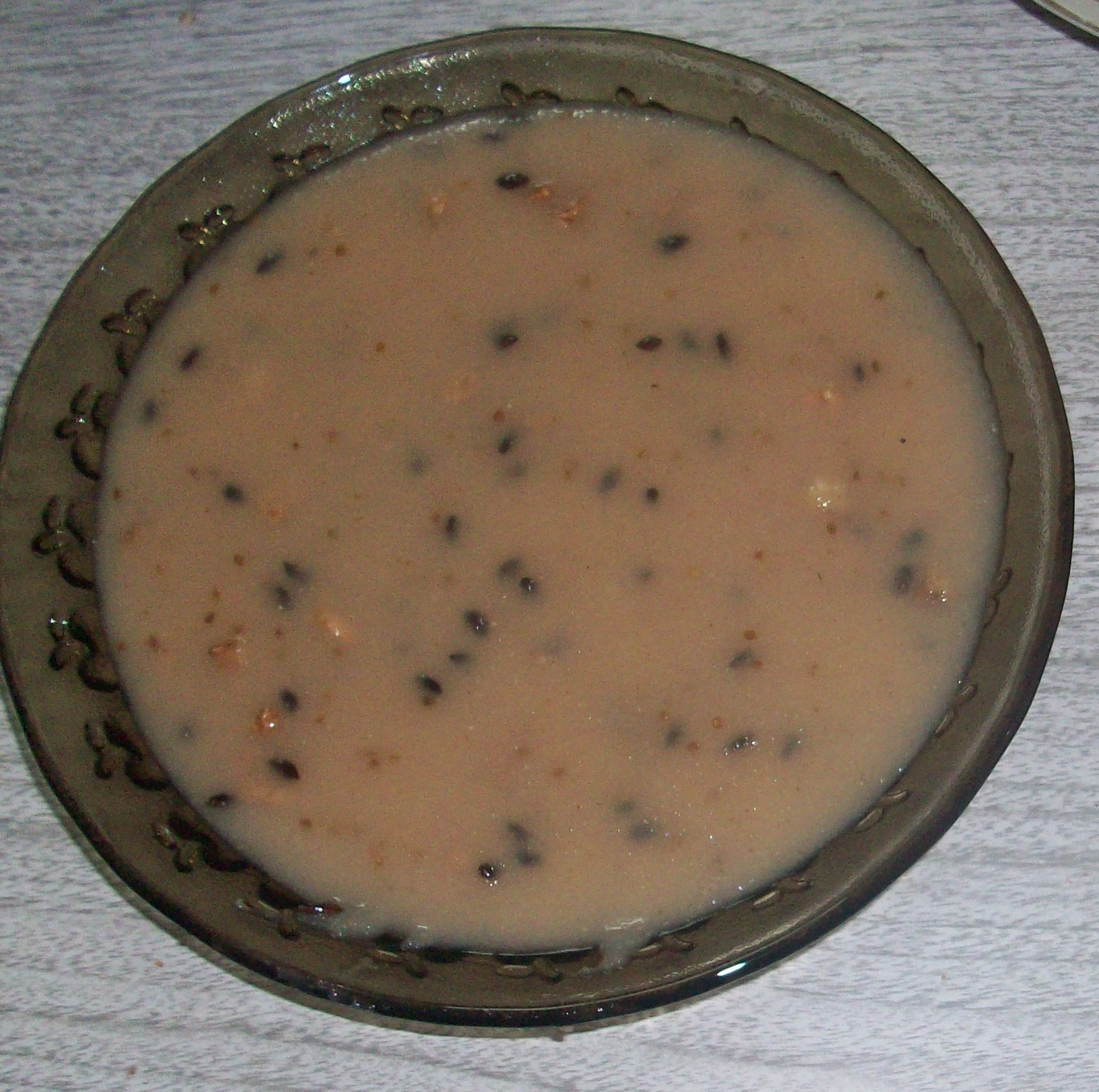
Khabeesa pudding, flavored with seeds and nuts
