= Tatbila =

Palestine sauce used as a topping for hummus

Tatbeela/Tatbeeleh
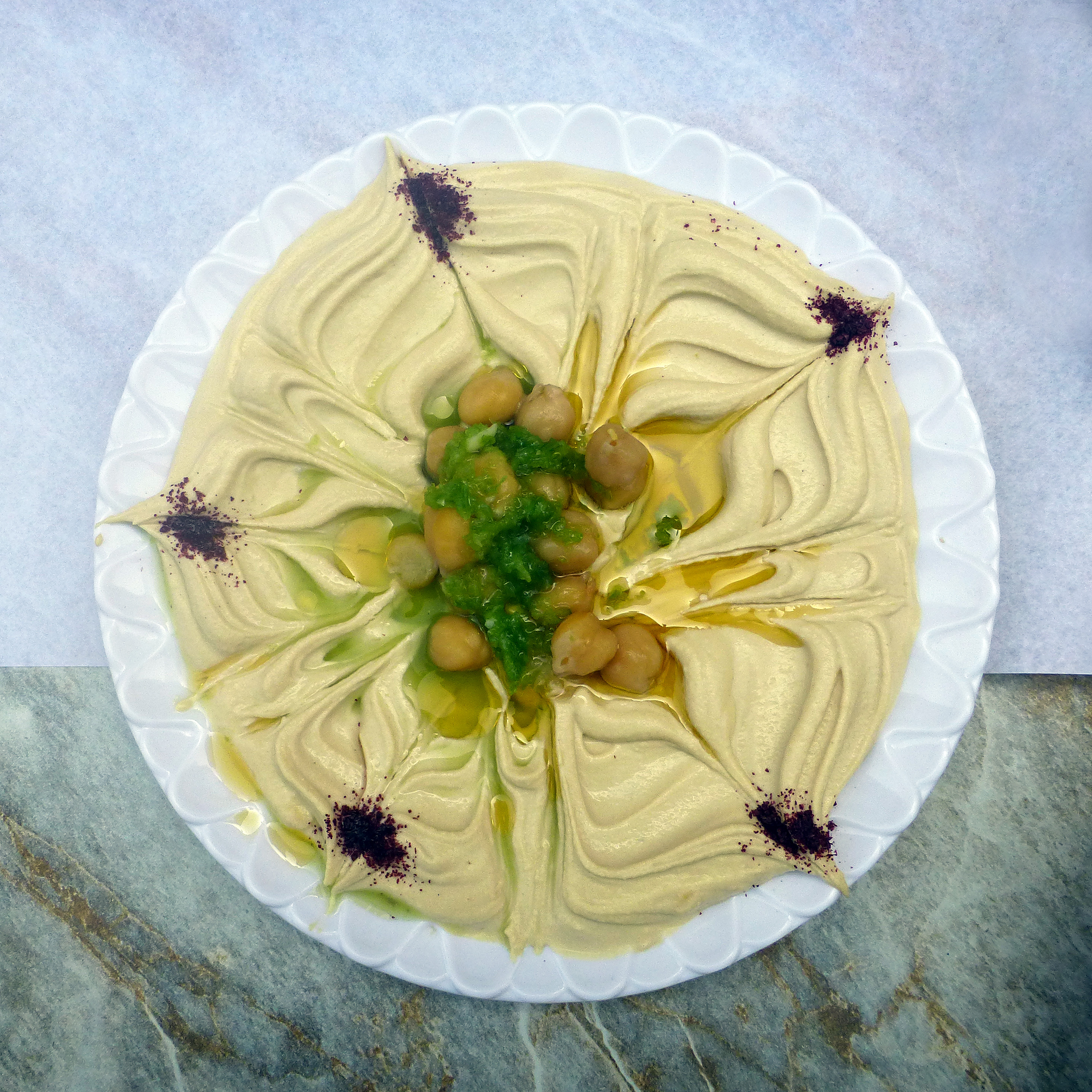
- Hummus with "tatbila" on top in Jordan
- Type: condiment
- Main ingredients: green chili, lemon juice, salt

Tatbeela is a condiment made from green chilis and lemon juice traditionally added to hummus.

== Etymology ==
In Arabic, tatbeela (Arabic: تتبيلة) simply means "seasoning", derived from the root tab-bala (Arabic: تَبَّلَ).

== Ingredients and preparation ==
Tatbila is made from a mixture of green chiles (such as serrano chiles), garlic, lemon juice, water, and various herbs and spices. The exact recipe can vary depending on the region and the individual cook's preferences, but common herbs and spices used include parsley, cilantro, cumin, and paprika.

To prepare tatbila, the ingredients are typically combined in a food processor or blender and puréed until smooth. Some variations may call for additional ingredients, such as yogurt or mayonnaise, to give the condiment a creamier texture.

== Usage ==
Tatbeelah is traditionally served as a topping for hummus, both at home and at hummusiyas across the country. It is also served as a dipping sauce for falafel, shawarma and other Middle Eastern street foods.

== See also ==
- Harif
- List of condiments
- Shatta
