= Poichichade =

French chickpea puree

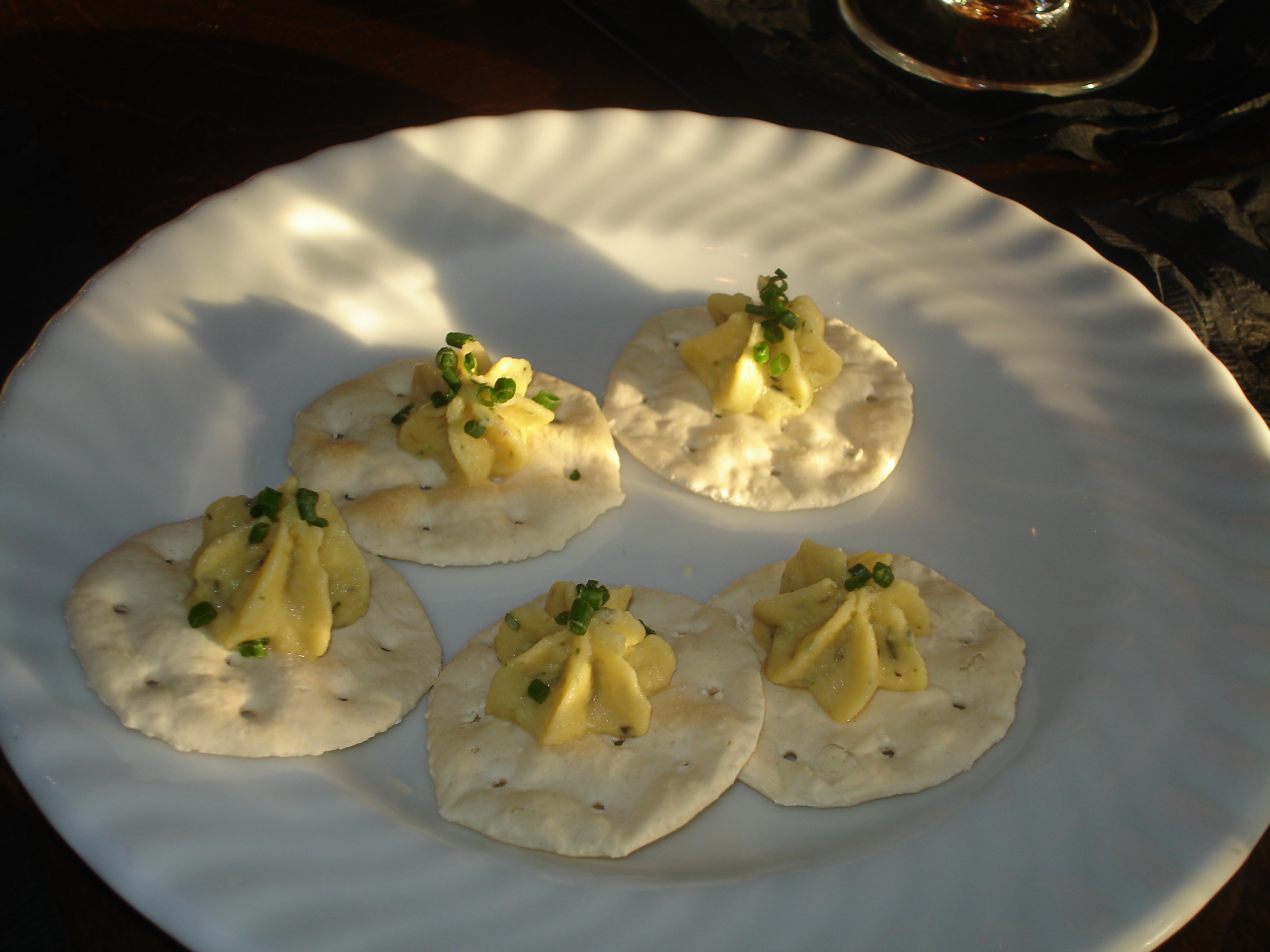
Poichichade served on wafer crackers

Poichichade (Occitan: Sopa), also known as céserade (from ceze, meaning "chickpea" in Occitan), is a chickpea puree originating from the south of France.

== Details ==
This culinary specialty, similar to hummus but without tahini in its composition, is widespread throughout the southern region of France. Its popularity stems largely from the ancestral culture of chickpeas, which has been present since the Middle Ages and even Antiquity in certain areas.

The tradition of poichichade is deeply rooted in the south of France, where the consumption of chickpeas is particularly associated with Palm Sunday. In these lands, chickpeas play a central role in festive meals and hold significant cultural meaning.
