= Msabbaha =

Variation of hummus

Masabaḥa
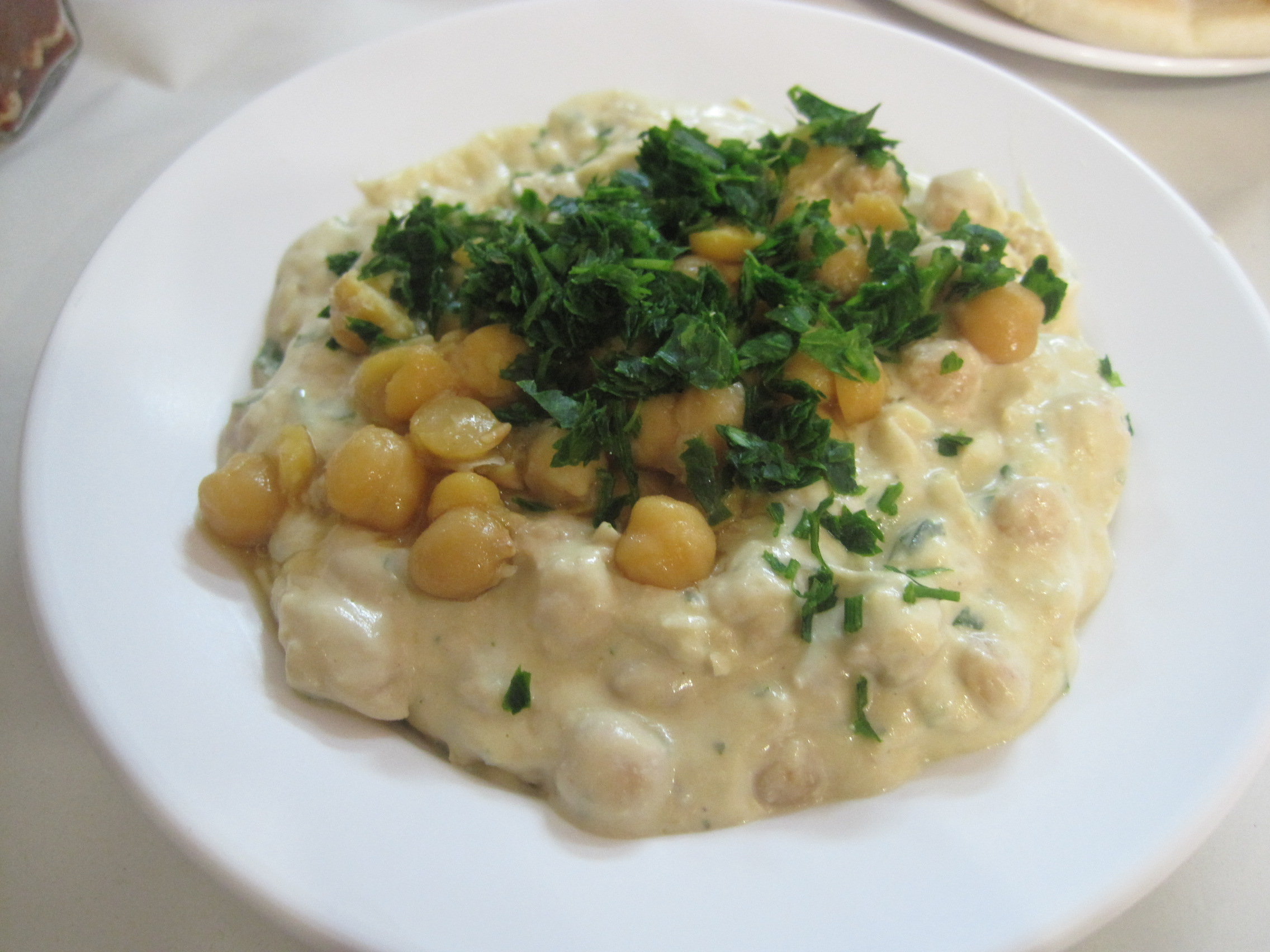
- Alternative names: Musabbaḥa, mashausha
- Course: Breakfast
- Place of origin: Levant
- Main ingredients: Chickpeas, Tahini, parsley, lemon juice, garlic

Musabbaḥa (Arabic: مسبحة), also known as msabbaḥa, mashausha (Arabic: مشوشة), is a runnier variation of hummus made up of whole chickpeas and tahini. It is popular in the Levant.

== Etymology ==
The full native name in Arabic is hummus musabaha, with root sabaha meaning "swim", referencing the fact that the chickpeas are "swimming" in the tahini and olive oil.

== History ==
Syrian author Zafir al-Qasimi wrote in his 1960 book Dictionary of Damascene Industries that hummus shops in Damascus often sold msabbaha alongside hummus b'tahina and taskiyeh, he described msabbaha as a dish of mashed chickpeas and tahini combined with whole chickpeas topped with samneh and pine nuts, with a variation of it topped with oil instead.

== Ingredients ==
The main difference between msabbaḥa and hummus is the texture. In contrast with hummus, the chickpeas here remain whole. Author Paula Wolfert describes it as "deconstructed hummus". It sometimes contains hard-boiled egg, and like hummus, it is typically eaten with pita bread.

A variation of msabbaḥa common in Damascus serves chickpeas and tahini with melted butter, pomegranate or lemon juice, and pistachios or toasted pine nuts. In Lebanon, it is known as masabaḥa or mashawsha, and may be served with a hot sauce condiment with side dishes. It is also sold prepackaged.
