= Shatta (condiment) =

Middle Eastern hot sauce

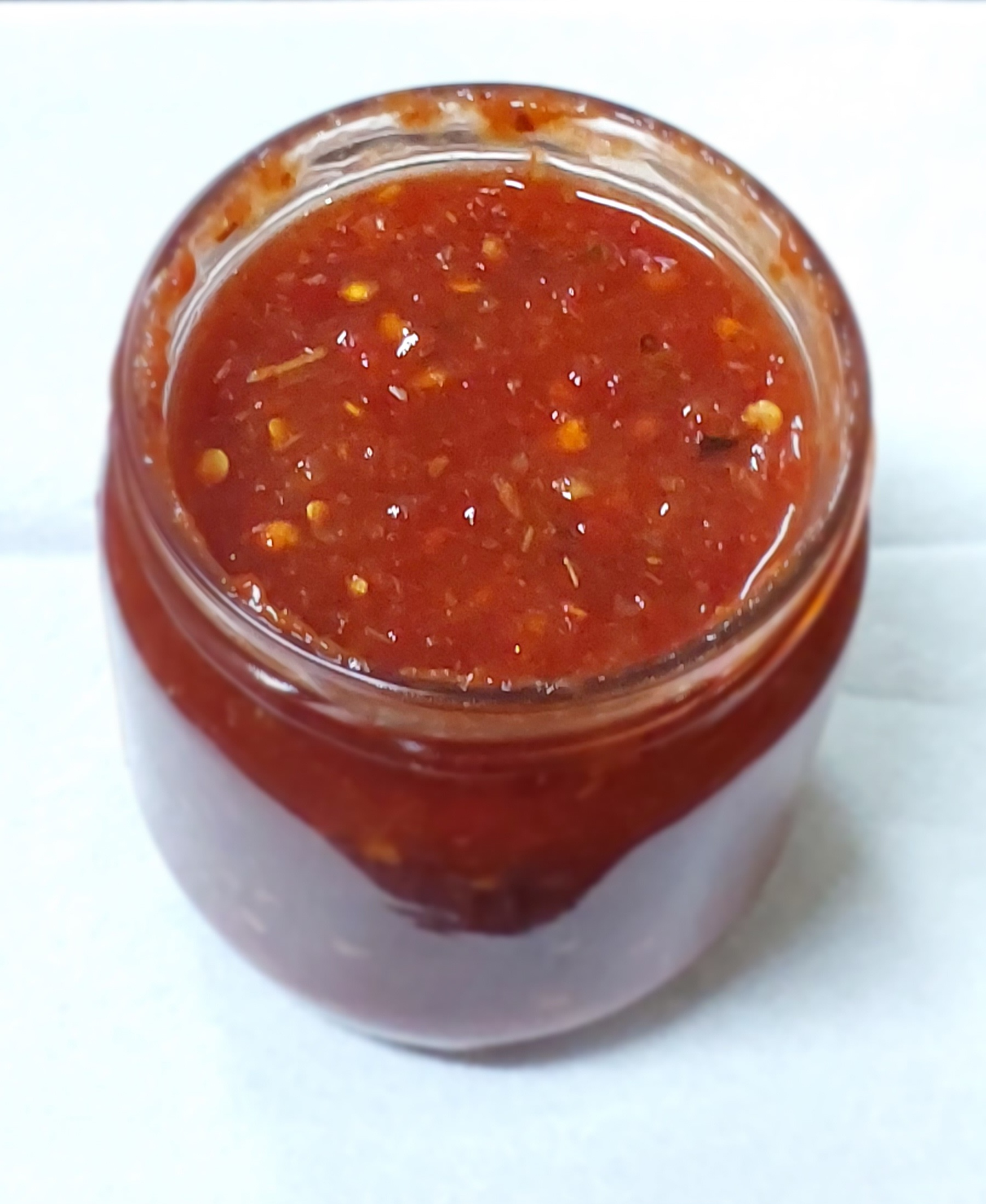
- A jar of red shatta
- Course: Condiment
- Place of origin: Levant
- Associated cuisine: Levantine
- Main ingredients: Chili peppers, salt, olive oil, garlic
- Variations: Red shatta, green shatta

Shatta (Arabic: شطة, romanized: shaṭṭah) is a hot sauce popular in the Middle East, and especially in the Levant. It is made from fresh chilli peppers, salt, and garlic, which are mixed together and then left to ferment.

== Name ==
The word shatta (شطة, shaṭṭah) simply means 'hot pepper' in Arabic; as such, the term shatta is sometimes used in Arabic as a catch-all for hot pepper sauce, like sriracha.

Therefore, sometimes the name shatta shamiyya (شطة شامية, shaṭṭah shāmiyyah, 'Levantine shatta') is used to refer to this condiment. Another name for it is filfil mat’hoon (فلفل مطحون, filfil maṭḥūn, 'ground chili').

== Ingredients and preparation ==
Traditional shatta is made by crushing red or green chilli peppers and then letting them undergo lactic fermentation with salt for several days. Common additions include garlic during fermentation, or vinegar, lemon juice, or olive oil added once fermentation is complete. The texture of the paste can range from ground and pourable to chunky depending on how its processed; the peppers can be chopped, passed through a food processor, or pounded by mortar and pestle. The fermentation process can be skipped and the paste may be immediately served after preparation.

After preparation is done, the sauce should be stored refrigerated in sterilized jars, which contain no moisture to prevent spoilage.

The peppers used are usually fresh. They can be green or red, which will affect the color of the resulting condiment. The type of chilli used can vary.

Some traditional recipes may call for sun-drying the chilli instead of using it fresh, which would reduce the moisture further.

== Culinary uses ==
Shatta is used to enhance the flavor of many dishes, such as falafel, hummus, grilled meats, and roasted vegetables. It can be used as dip, dressing, or garnish.

== Popularity ==
Shatta is popular across the Middle East, and particularly popular in the Levant region and Egypt, being a staple in Gazan cuisine.

In many restaurants started by the Arab diaspora outside the Middle East, shatta is served as condiment.

== Similar foods ==
Daggit toma wa-lamoon (دقة ثوم وليمون, daqqat thawm wa-laymūn, 'pounded garlic and lemons') is a very similar hot-and-sour condiment made from garlic, salt, green chilis and lemon juice. It is prepared in a mortar and pestle, then served fresh instead of fermented. It is popular in Gazan cuisine, and is a traditional topping for qudsiyeh (قدسية, qudsiyya, Jerusalem-style hummus) and ful medames (fava bean stew).

== See also ==
- Chili sauce and paste
- Harissa
- Zhoug
- Sriracha
