= Qidreh =

Rice and lamb dish

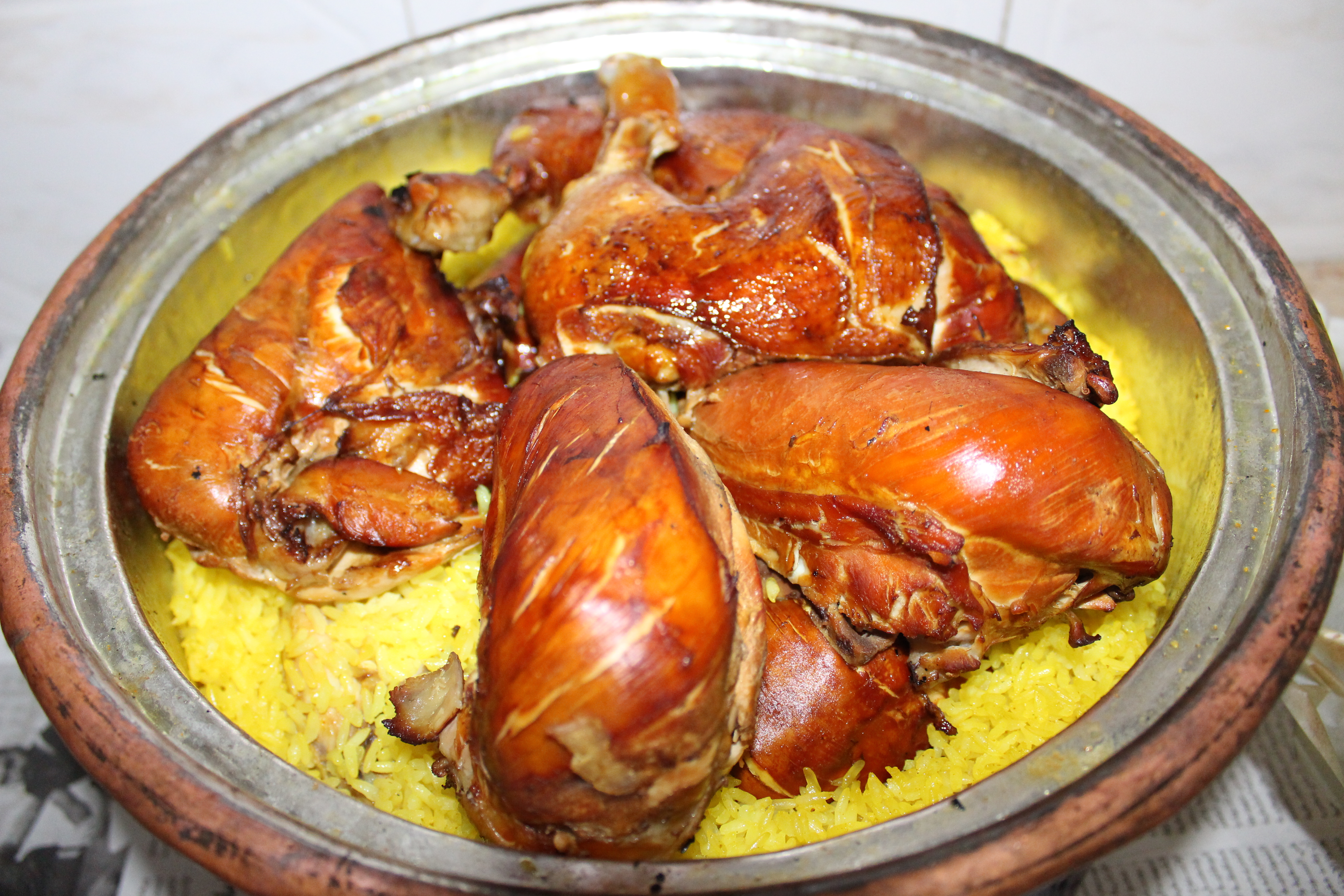
- A chicken variation of qidreh
- Alternative names: Kidra, qidra
- Course: Main course
- Region or state: Palestine
- Associated cuisine: Palestinian cuisine
- Serving temperature: Hot
- Main ingredients: Rice, lamb or chicken
- Variations: Beef or chicken in place of lamb; the addition of chickpeas, garlic cloves, and onions

Qidreh (Arabic: قدرة) is a rice and lamb dish in Palestinian cuisine, commonly served at social gatherings like weddings and feasts. The dish is most common in the cities of Hebron, Gaza, and Jerusalem, and is usually topped with toasted nuts. Chickpeas and whole garlic cloves may also be incorporated into the rice. The dish is traditionally prepared in clay ovens on coals, but regular ovens may also be used; the lamb may also be swapped out for chicken.

== Origin ==
The origins of the dish are not agreed upon, but most sources state that it originates from the city of Hebron, although different sources attribute it to different Palestinian families. The time period is also uncertain and sometimes traced back to the time of the Ottoman Empire.

== Name ==
Qidra (Arabic: قِدرَة, romanized: qidrah) means "pot" or sometimes specifically "clay vessel"; the dish is named after the pot it is cooked in.

The name is sometimes pronounced or spelled as idreh in Latin transliteration. Levantine Arabic speakers may sometimes pronounce q (qaf) as a glottal stop.

== Preparation and ingredients ==
The meat and rice are cooked together in the same pot, and local clarified butter called samneh is added. Ingredients vary between cities. The meat is traditionally lamb.

The dish is typically served with thick yogurt and Arab salad.

== Variations ==
In Gaza, the dish is traditionally cooked in unglazed clay pots. The pots are prepared at home and then taken to a wood or coal fired communal oven, where the owner of the oven does the cooking, and each clay pot is marked with a name. A Dutch oven on a stove is used in contemporary versions.

Traditional qidreh originating from Hebron is plain, with few spices, contemporary and regional variations such as that of Gaza add chickpeas, onions, whole garlic cloves, and different spices. Qidreh in Hebron is traditionally cooked in a copper pot.

Using freekeh along with or in place of the rice is common in some regional versions.

== Culture ==
Qidra is a festive dish, as such, it is usually made in large quantities. It is often served during ceremonies like weddings and birth ceremonies (aqiqah), especially on Fridays and during the month of Ramadan, as well as during Eid al-Fitr and Eid al-Adha. It is usually never made at home, and is reserved for special occasions.

Palestinian Christians commonly consume the dish on Christmas.

== Gallery ==
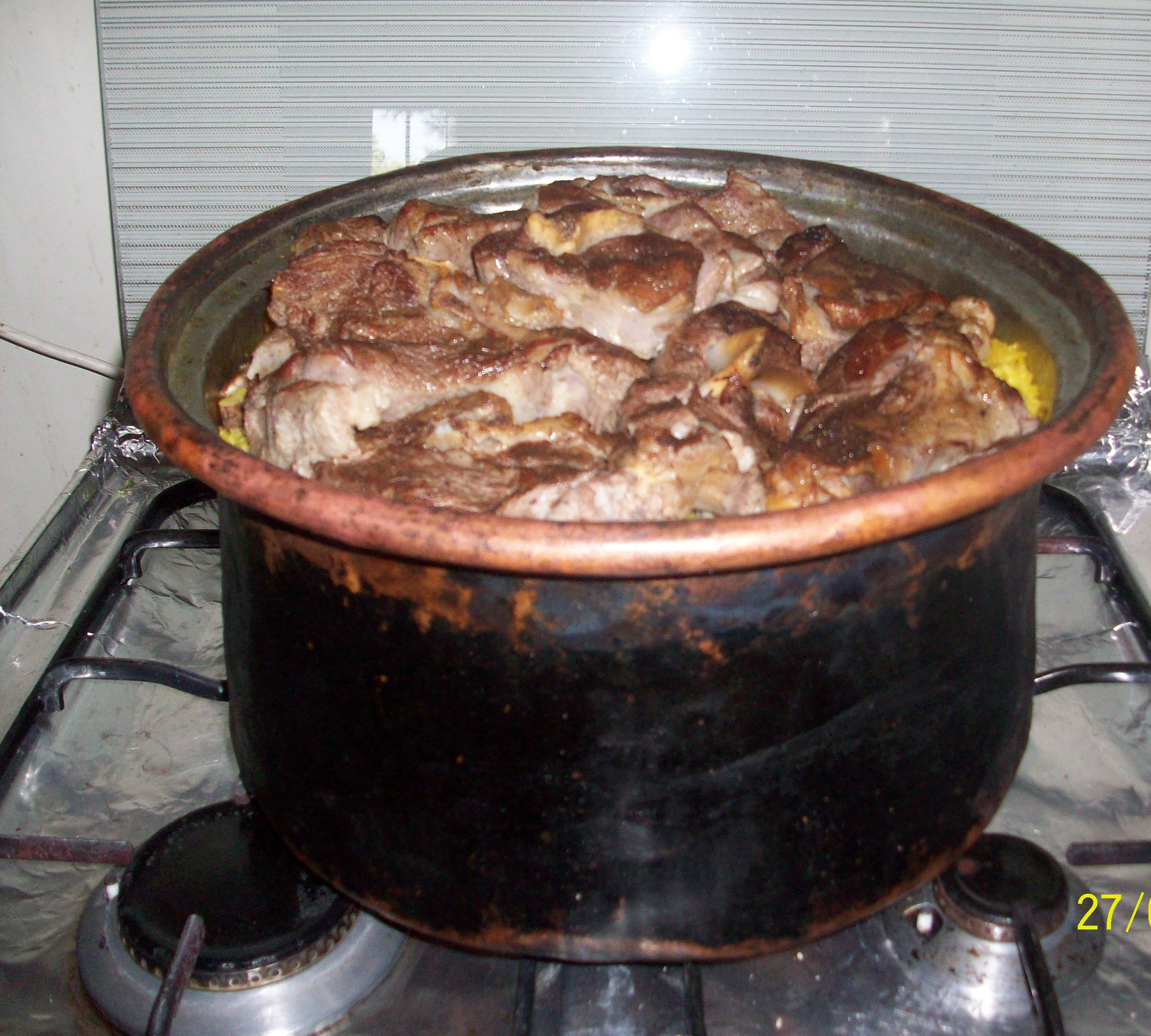
Qidreh with lamb meat

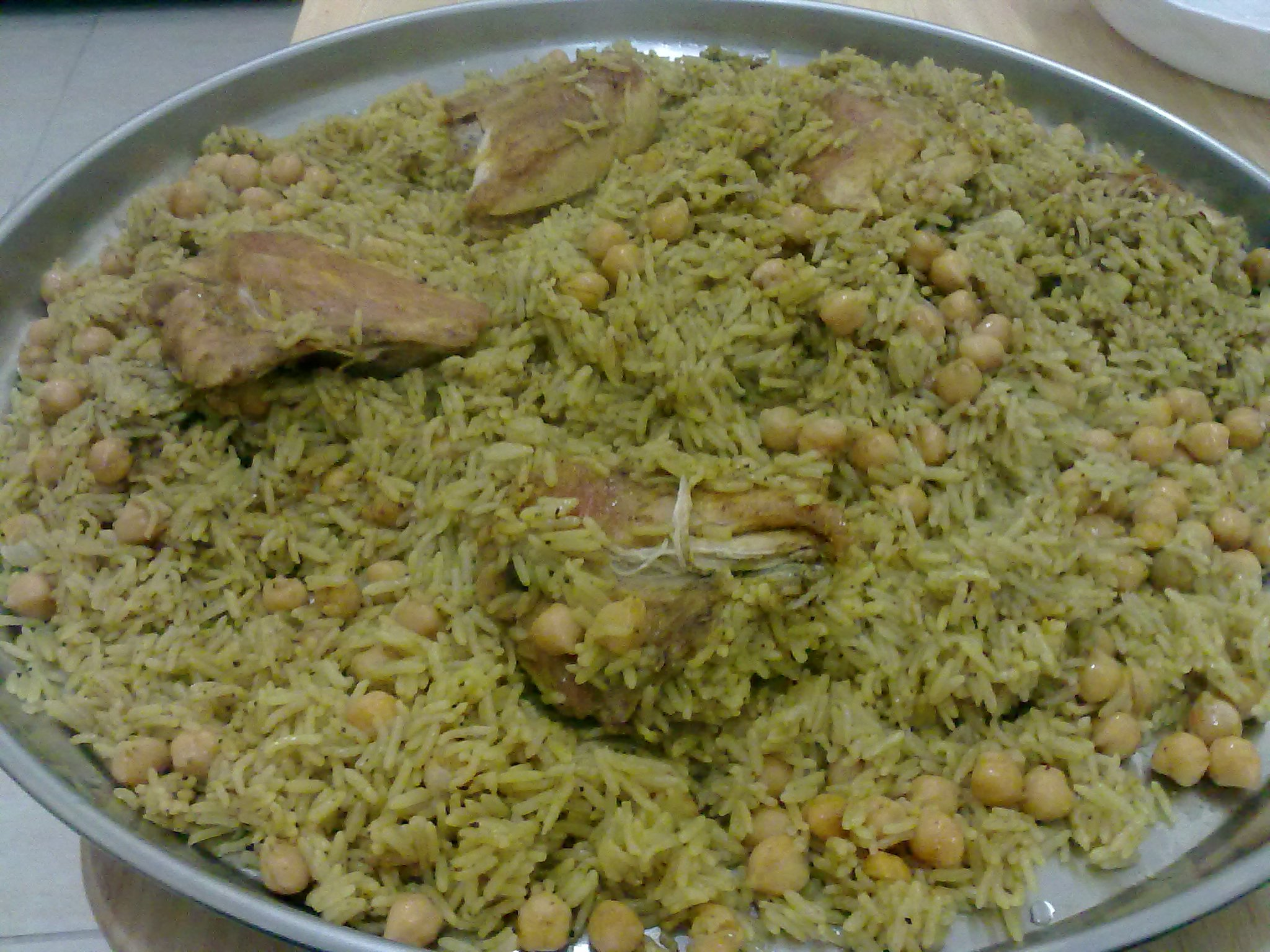
Qidreh with chickpeas

== See also ==
- Maqluba, Palestinian rice and meat pilaf
- Mansaf, Jordanian rice and meat pilaf
- Kabsa, Arabian rice and meat pilaf
- Mandi, Yemeni rice and meat pilaf
- Quzi, Iraqi rice and meat pilaf
- Biryani, South Asian rice and meat pilaf
- List of rice dishes
