= Hummus =

Middle Eastern chickpea puree dish

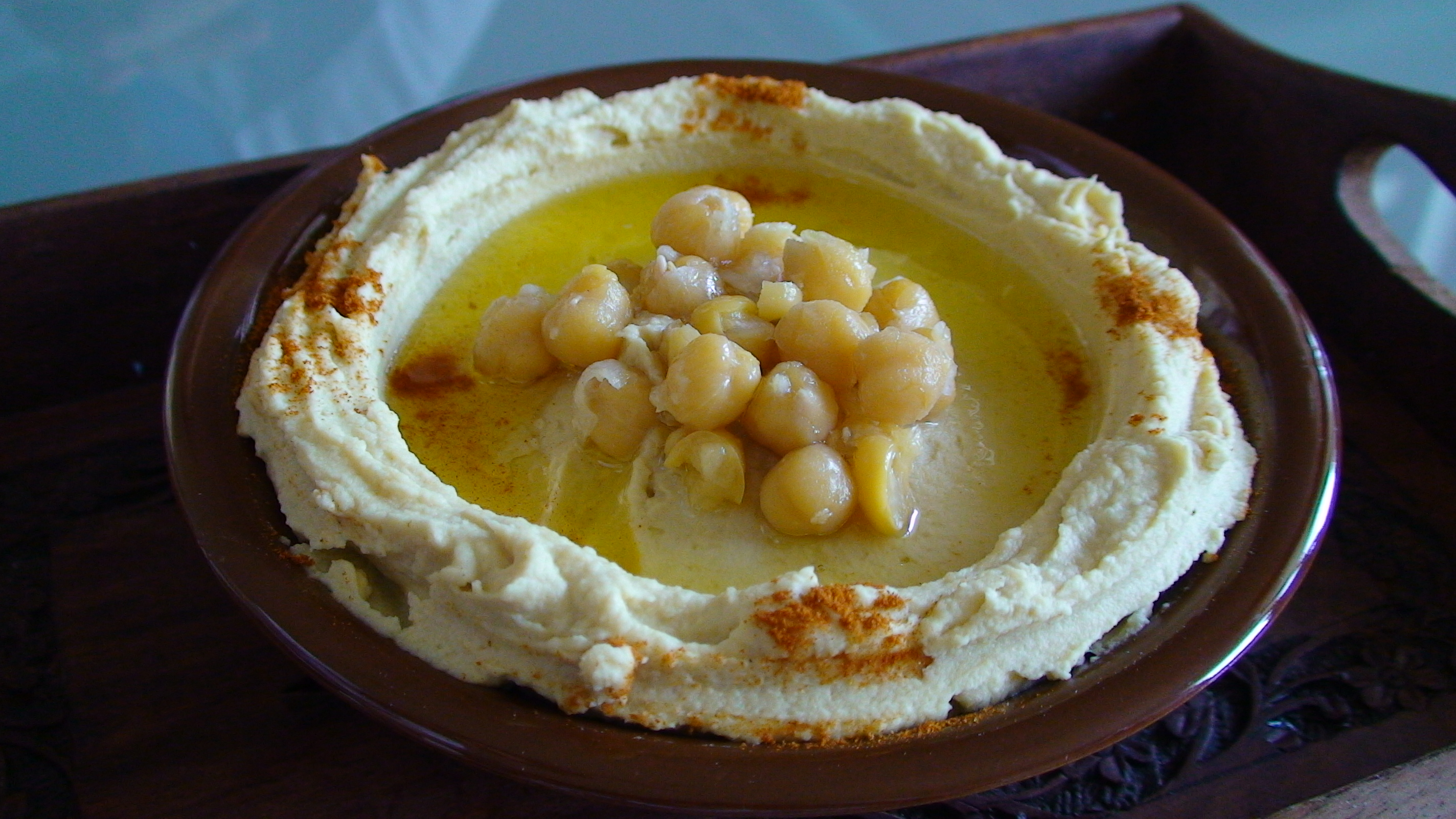
- Course: Meze
- Place of origin: Middle East
- Region or state: Levant and Egypt
- Serving temperature: Room temperature or cold
- Main ingredients: Chickpeas, tahini

Hummus (/ˈhʊməs/, /ˈhʌməs/; Arabic: حُمُّص, romanized: ḥummuṣ, lit. 'chickpeas', also spelled hommus or houmous) (full name: Hummus Bi Tahini) is a Levantine dip, spread, or savory dish made from cooked, mashed chickpeas blended with tahini, lemon juice, and garlic. The standard garnish includes olive oil, a few whole chickpeas, parsley, and paprika.

The earliest mention of hummus was in a 13th century cookbook attributed to the historian Ibn al-Adim from Aleppo in present-day Syria.

Commonly consumed in Levantine cuisine, it is usually eaten as a dip with pita bread. In the West, it is produced industrially and consumed as a snack or appetizer with crackers or vegetables.

== Etymology and spelling ==
The word hummus is Arabic: حُمُّص, romanized: ḥummuṣ 'chickpeas'. The full name of the prepared spread in Arabic is ḥummuṣ bi ṭaḥīna 'chickpeas with tahini'. The colloquial Arabic word ḥummuṣ is a variant of the Arabic ḥimmaṣ or ḥimmiṣ which may be derived from the Aramaic language (חמצי ḥemṣīn, ḥemṣāy), corresponding to the Syriac word for chickpeas: ḥem(m)ṣē. The word entered the English language around the mid-20th century from the Arabic ḥummuṣ or via its borrowing for the name of the dish in Turkish: humus.

Spelling of the word in English can be inconsistent, though most major dictionaries from American and British publishers give hummus as the primary spelling. Some American dictionaries give hommos as an alternative, while British dictionaries give houmous or hoummos.

The major British supermarkets use houmous.

Other spellings include homous, houmos, houmus, and similar variants. While humus (as it is spelled in Turkish) is sometimes found, it is avoided as a heteronym of humus, organic matter in soil.

== Origin and history ==
Although multiple different theories and claims of origins exist in various parts of the Middle East, evidence is insufficient to determine the precise location or time of the invention of hummus. Its basic ingredients—chickpeas, sesame, lemon, and garlic—have been combined and eaten in Egypt and the Levant for centuries. Though regional populations widely ate chickpeas, and often cooked them in stews and other hot dishes, puréed chickpeas eaten cold with tahini do not appear in records before the Abbasid Caliphate in Egypt and the Levant.

The earliest mention of a dish equivalent to hummus comes from Syria, in a 13th-century cookbook attributed to Ibn al-Adim. The recipe, which the cookbook calls chickpea kisāʾ (garment), includes chickpeas, lemon, sesame, and olive oil, but omits garlic. Other early written recipes for a dish resembling ḥummuṣ bi ṭaḥīna are recorded in cookbooks written in Cairo in the 14th-century. A cold purée of chickpeas with vinegar and pickled lemons with herbs, spices, and oil, but no tahini or garlic, appears in the Treasure Trove of Benefits and Variety at the Table (كنز الفوائد في تنويع الموائد); and a purée of chickpeas and tahini called hummus kasa appears in Muhammad bin Hasan al-Baghdadi's The Book of Dishes: it is based on puréed chickpeas and tahini, and acidulated with vinegar (not lemon), but it also contains many spices, herbs, and nuts, and no garlic. It is also served by rolling it out and letting it sit overnight.

According to food historian Nawal Nasrallah, no records of recipes for hummus exist after the 14th century until an 1885 Lebanese cookbook, by which time garlic is established as a standard ingredient. A description of hummus is found in Elihu Grant's 1921 The People of Palestine, which described the culinary habits of fellahin: "Salads of all kinds are enjoyed by the people. Ḥumuṣ b’ṭeḥîneh is made from dried chick-peas boiled, mashed with olive-oil and flavored with ṭeḥîneh. Ṭeḥîneh is a mixture of olive-oil, serej and some sour substance, either vinegar or lemon-juice."

== Regional preparations ==
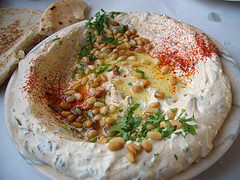
Hummus with pine nuts and olive oil

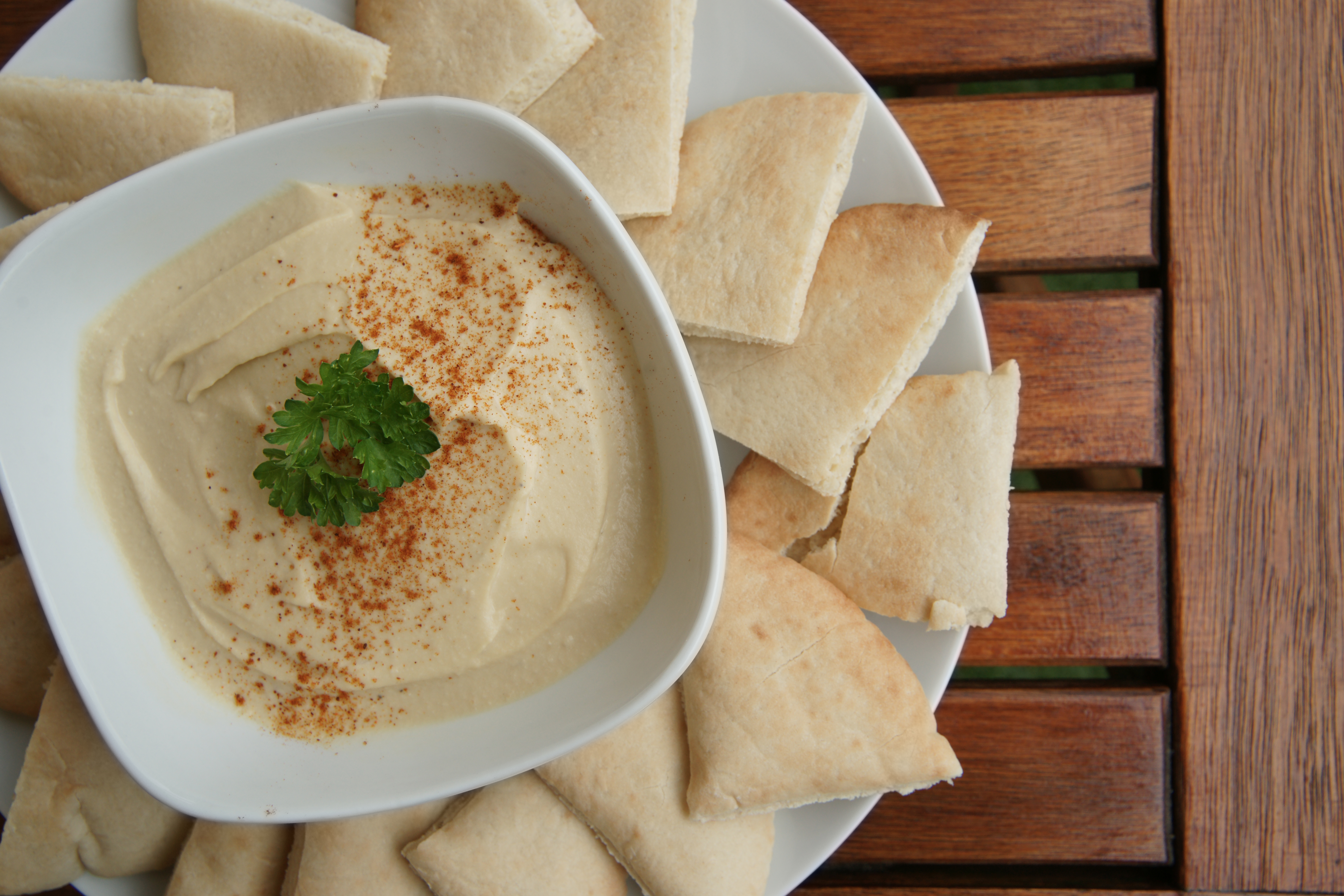
Hummus served in a bowl on a platter of pita bread

As an appetizer and dip, diners scoop hummus with flatbread, such as pita. It is also served as part of a meze or as an accompaniment to falafel, grilled chicken, fish, or eggplant.

Hummus is a common dip in Egypt where it is eaten with pita, and frequently flavored with cumin or other spices.

In the Levant, hummus has long been a staple food, often served as a warm dish, with bread for breakfast, lunch or dinner. All of the ingredients in hummus are easily found in gardens, farms and markets, thus adding to the availability and popularity of the dish. Hummus is usually garnished with olive oil, "nana" mint leaves, paprika, and parsley.

Hummus is a common part of everyday meals in Israel. It is made from ingredients that, following Kashrut (Jewish dietary laws), can be combined with both meat and dairy meals. Chickpea dishes have long been part of the cuisine of Jews who lived in the Middle East and Northern Africa. The many Mizrahi Jewish immigrants from these countries brought their own unique variations, such as hummus with fried eggplant and boiled eggs prepared by Iraqi Jews. Israeli versions use large amounts of tahini for a creamier texture.

One author calls hummus "one of the most popular and best-known of all Syrian dishes" and a "must on any mezzeh table". Syrian and Lebanese in Canada's Arab diaspora prepare and consume hummus along with other dishes like falafel, kibbeh and tabbouleh, even among the third- and fourth-generation offspring of the original immigrants.

In Cyprus, hummus is part of the local cuisine in both Turkish Cypriot and Greek Cypriot communities where it is called "humoi" (Greek: χούμοι). In the United Kingdom, hummus was popularized by Greek Cypriot caterers, sometimes leading to a perception of it being a Greek food.

In Turkey, hummus is considered a meze.

In France, in the region of Provence, there is a dish called poichichade that resembles hummus.

In the United States and Europe, hummus is commercially available in numerous traditional and non-traditional varieties, such as beet or chocolate.

== Nutrition ==
Hummus, commercial
Nutritional value per 100 g (3.5 oz)
- Energy: 243 kcal (1,020 kJ)
- Carbohydrates: 14.9 g
- Sugars: 0.3 g
- Dietary fiber: 5.4 g
- Fat: 16.1 g
- Saturated: 2.2 g
- Monounsaturated: 6.4 g
- Polyunsaturated: 7.5 g
- Protein: 7.35 g
Vitamins and minerals
Vitamins	Quantity %DV^{†}
Vitamin A equiv.	0% 1 μg
Thiamine (B1)	13% 0.15 mg
Riboflavin (B2)	9% 0.12 mg
Niacin (B3)	3% 0.53 mg
Pantothenic acid (B5)	6% 0.32 mg
Vitamin B6	8% 0.14 mg
Folate (B9)	9% 36 μg
Vitamin C	0% 0 mg
Vitamin E	11% 1.7 mg
Vitamin K	14% 17.2 μg
Minerals	Quantity %DV^{†}
Calcium	4% 49 mg
Copper	39% 0.35 mg
Iron	13% 2.4 mg
Magnesium	17% 71 mg
Manganese	48% 1.1 mg
Phosphorus	13% 166 mg
Potassium	10% 289 mg
Selenium	29% 16.2 μg
Sodium	19% 438 mg
Zinc	13% 1.4 mg
- Other constituents: Quantity
- Water: 58.7 g
- Link to USDA FoodData Central entry
- ^{†}Percentages estimated using US recommendations for adults, except for potassium, which is estimated based on expert recommendation from the National Academies.

Commercial hummus is 59% water, 15% carbohydrates, 7% protein, and 16% fat (table). In a reference amount of 100 grams (3.5 oz), commercial hummus supplies 243 calories of food energy, and is a rich source (20% or more of the Daily Value, DV) of copper (39% DV), manganese (45% DV), and selenium (29% DV, table). Hummus is a moderate source (10–20% DV) of thiamine, vitamin E, vitamin K, and several dietary minerals (table).

== Packaged product ==
=== United Kingdom ===
In the 1980s, the supermarket Waitrose was the first British supermarket to stock hummus, spelled houmous. Hummus was popularized in the UK by chefs such as Yotam Ottolenghi, Claudia Roden and Anissa Helou. As of 2013, £60 million worth of hummus was sold in the UK each year, and one survey found that 41% of British respondents had hummus in their fridge, twice as many as the rest of Europe. A Waitrose spokesperson said it had become a grocery staple.

=== United States ===
In 2006, hummus was present in 12 percent of American households, rising to 17 percent by early 2009. One commentator attributed the growth of hummus to America's embrace of ethnic and exotic foods.

While in 2006–2008 when some 15 million Americans consumed hummus, and annual national sales were about $5 million, sales growth in 2016 was reflected by an estimated 25% of US households consuming hummus. By 2016, the leading American hummus manufacturer, Sabra Dipping Company, held a 62% market share for hummus sales in the United States, and was forecast to exceed $1 billion in sales in 2017.

To meet the rising consumer demand for hummus, American farmers increased their production of chickpeas four-fold since 2009, harvesting more than 100,000,000 pounds (45,000 tonnes) in 2015, an increase from 25,000,000 pounds (11,000 tonnes) in 2009. Hummus consumption has been so popular that many tobacco farmers have switched to growing chickpeas to meet demand.

== In culture ==
Hummus is often seen as an unofficial "national dish" of Israel, reflecting its huge popularity and significance among the entire Israeli population, which Israel's critics describe as an appropriation of Lebanese, Palestinian or Arab culture. According to Ofra Tene and Dafna Hirsch, the dispute over ownership of hummus exposes nationalism through food and the important role played by the industrialization of hummus made by Israeli private companies in 1958. Although hummus has traditionally been part of the cuisine of the Mizrahi Jews who lived in Arabic-speaking lands, the dish was also popularized among the Jewish immigrants from Europe in the late 19th and early 20th century. Historian Dafna Hirsch describes its adoption in their diet as part of an attempt of blending in the Middle Eastern environment, while sociologist Rafi Grosglick points out the importance of its health aspects to their diet. In recent years, through a process of gourmetization, the Arab identity of hummus became a marker of its authenticity, making famous Arab-Israeli villages such as Abu Gosh and Kafr Yasif. Hence, enthusiasts travel to the more remote Arab and Druze villages in the northern Galilee region for culinary experiences.

In October 2008, the Association of Lebanese Industrialists petitioned the Lebanese Ministry of Economy and Trade to request protected status from the European Commission for hummus as a uniquely Lebanese food, similar to the Protected Geographical Status rights held over regional food items by various European Union countries. As of 2009, the Lebanese Industrialists Association was still "collecting documents and proof" to support its claim.

The 2005 short film West Bank Story features a rivalry between two fictional restaurants, the Israeli "Kosher King" and the Palestinian "Hummus Hut". A parody of West Side Story, the film won the 2006 Academy Award for Best Live Action Short Film. In 2012, Australian filmmaker Trevor Graham released a documentary, Make Hummus Not War, on the political and gastronomic aspects of hummus.

Lebanon and Israel's chefs have been engaged in a competition over the largest dish of hummus, as validated by the Guinness World Record, as a form of contestation of "ownership". The "title" has gone back and forth between Israel (2008), Lebanon (2009), Israel (January 2010), and, as of 2021, Lebanon (May 2010). The winning dish, cooked by 300 cooks in the village of al-Fanar, near Beirut, weighed approximately 10,450 kilograms (23,040 lb), more than double the weight of the Israeli-Arab previous record.

== See also ==
- Bean dip – Type of dipping sauce
- List of dips
- List of hors d'oeuvre
- List of legume dishes
- Msabbaha – Variation of hummus
- Poichichade – Similar dish from France

== Bibliography ==
- Afzal-Khan, Fawzia; Seshadri-Crooks, Kalpana (2000), Fawzia Afzal-Khan; Kalpana Seshadri-Crooks (eds.), The Pre-occupation of Postcolonial Studies, Duke University Press, ISBN 9780822325215
- Amster, Linda; Sheraton, Mimi (2003), Linda Amster (ed.), The New York Times Jewish Cookbook: More Than 825 Traditional and Contemporary Recipes from Around the World, St. Martin's Press, ISBN 9780312290931
- Bricklin, Mark (1994), Prevention Magazine's Nutrition Advisor: The Ultimate Guide to the Health-Boosting and Health-Harming Factors in Your Diet, Rodale, ISBN 9780875962252
- Don Brothwell and Patricia Brothwell (1998), Food in Antiquity: A survey of the Diet of Early Peoples, Expanded Edition, Johns Hopkins University, ISBN 0-8018-5740-6
- Marks, Gil (2010), Encyclopedia of Jewish Food, John Wiley and Sons, pp. 269–271
- Rodinson, Maxime; Perry, Charles; A. J. Arberry (1998), Medieval Arab Cookery, Prospect Books (UK), ISBN 978-0907325918
- Habeeb Salloum; James Peters (1996), From the Lands of Figs and Olives: Over 300 Delicious and Unusual Recipes, I.B.Tauris, ISBN 1-86064-038-9
- Tannahill, Reay (1973), Food in History, Stein and Day, ISBN 0-517-57186-2
- Wesley D, Wesley E (2012), University of California Press (ed.), Beyond Hummus and Falafel: Social and Political Aspects of Palestinian Food in Israel, University of California Press, ISBN 9780520262324
