= Lebanese cuisine =

Culinary traditions of Lebanon

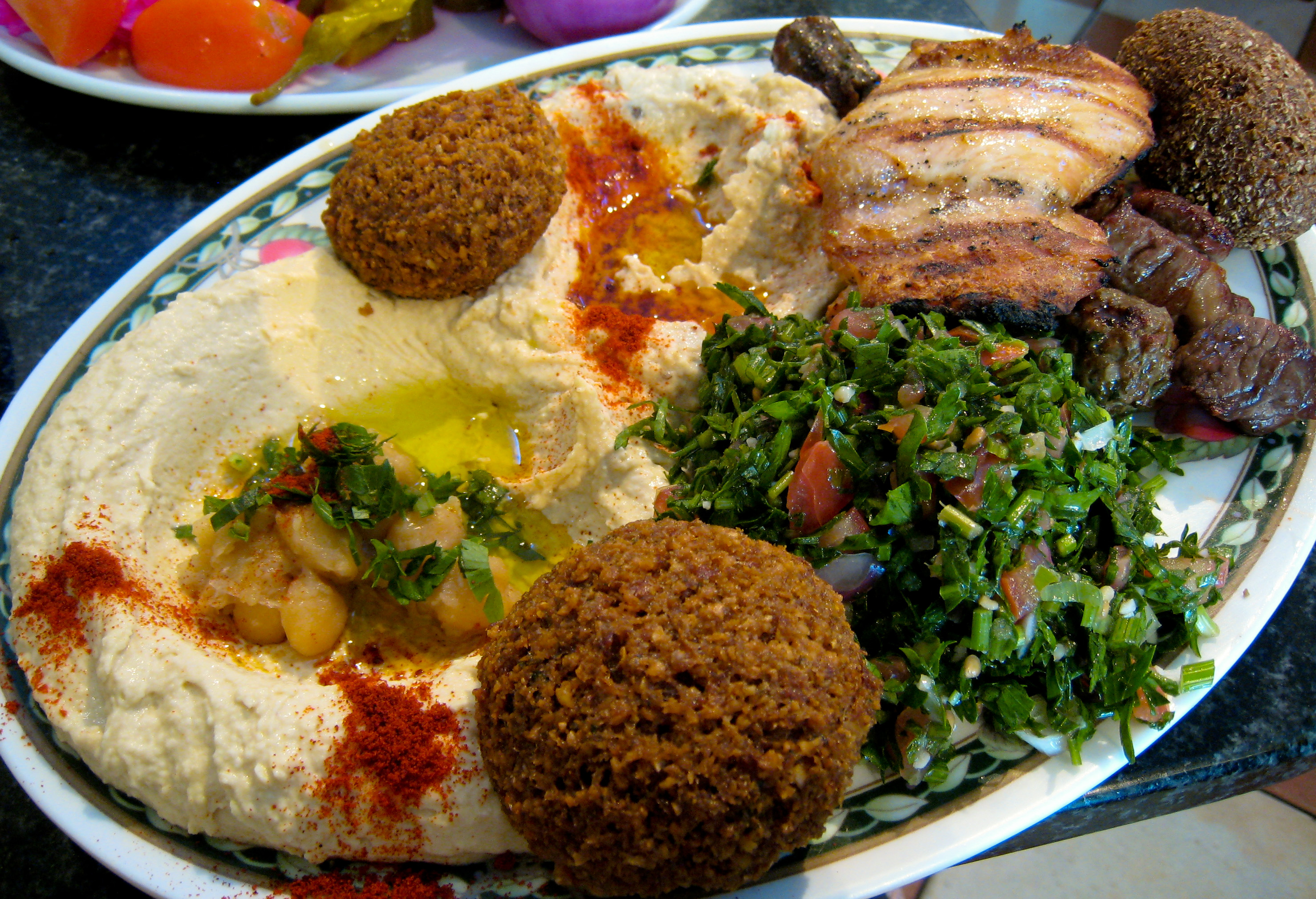

Lebanese cuisine comprises the culinary traditions and practices originating from Lebanon. It includes an abundance of whole grains, fruits, vegetables, fresh fish, and seafood. Poultry is eaten more often than red meat, and when red meat is eaten, it is usually lamb and beef. Dishes include copious amounts of garlic and olive oil, and are often seasoned with salt and lemon juice. Chickpeas and parsley are also staples of the Lebanese diet.

Well-known dishes include baba ghanouj, tabbouleh, sfeeha, falafel and shawarma. An important component of many Lebanese meals is hummus, a chickpea puree, and many dishes are eaten with flatbread. A plate of vegetables including tomatoes, cucumber, mint, olives and pickles is always served on the table, and a plate of fruits at the end of the meal with a Lebanese coffee. Well-known desserts include baklawa, sfouf, and ka'ak. Some desserts are specifically prepared on special occasions; for example, meghli (rice pudding dessert, spiced with anise, caraway, and cinnamon) is served to celebrate a newborn baby in the family.

Arak is an anise-flavoured liquor and is the Lebanese national drink, usually served with a traditional Lebanese meal. Another historic and traditional drink is Lebanese wine.

== History ==
Lebanon (in red) is at the crossroads of the Mediterranean basin and the Arabian hinterlands, West Asia

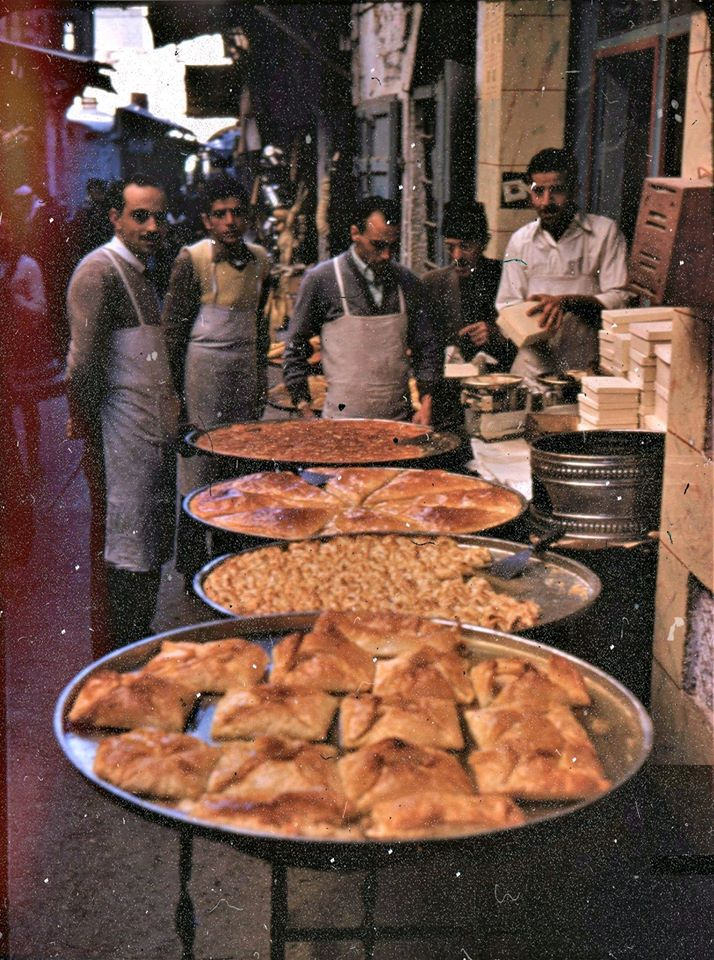
Sweets shop at a market in Beirut, 1955

Lebanese cuisine has ancient roots and is part of the culinary tradition of the Eastern Mediterranean. The diet of early humans in Lebanon was diverse, although hunting focused primarily on large game, particularly adult aurochs, fallow deer, red deer, and wild goats as well as rhinoceroses, which appear to have been a regularly available and significant food resource for Paleolithic inhabitants of the Lebanese coast, as indicated by their comparatively high proportion among the faunal remains at Ras el-Kelb Cave.

Many dishes in Lebanese cuisine can be traced back thousands of years to eras of Phoenician, Persian, Egyptian, Neo-Babylonian, Roman, Greek, Byzantine, Arab, and Ottoman rule. In the last 500 years, Lebanese cuisine has been influenced by the different foreign civilizations that held power. From 1516 to 1918, the Ottoman Turks controlled Lebanon and introduced a variety of foods that have become staples in the Lebanese diet, such as cooking with lamb. After the Ottomans were defeated in World War I (1914–1918), France took control of Lebanon until 1943, when the country achieved its independence. The French introduced foods such as flan, caramel custard, eclairs, french fries, and croissants. The 1885 cookbook Tadhkirat al-Khawatin wa-Ustadh al-Tabbakhin by Lebanese author Khalil Sarkis, published in Beirut, is one of the first widely read 19th century Arabic cookbooks, and was an important text for Levantine cuisine in general for decades.

The Lebanese diaspora who live worldwide has introduced new ingredients, spices, and culinary practices into Lebanese cuisine, keeping the cuisine innovative and renowned both beyond and within its borders.

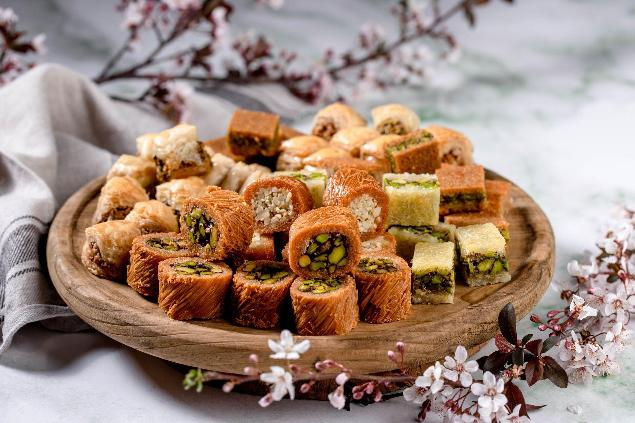
Hallab baklava is produced in Lebanon

Lebanese cuisine has become engrained as a staple in a multitude of cultures such as in Australia and in Brazil. It has also served both as a source of identity and income for the diaspora across the world, and as an investment opportunity for individuals and corporations wanting to expand and go global. Lebanese immigration had a significant influence on Mexican cuisine, particularly tacos al pastor, which developed from the vertical-roasting traditions brought by Lebanese immigrants and was adapted using Mexican ingredients and cooking practices.

The impoverishment caused by the Lebanese liquidity crisis forced many Lebanese to avoid traditional Ramadan sweets, as they stuck to the bare essentials, or to pivot to more affordable sweets that do not contain expensive ingredients such as cream or certain nuts, like qatayef. At some point, the price of a kilogram of dessert went from 24,000 Lebanese pounds, to 100,000, then around one-seventh of the minimum monthly wage.

== Overview ==
Most often, foods are grilled, baked, or lightly cooked in olive oil; butter or cream is rarely used other than in a few desserts. Vegetables are often eaten raw, pickled, or cooked. Like most Mediterranean countries, much of what the Lebanese eat is dictated by the seasons and what is available. Lebanese cuisine also varies by region. South Lebanon is famous for its kibbe, the Beqaa Valley for its meat pastries (such as sfiha), and North Lebanon and Saida (Sidon) for its sweets.

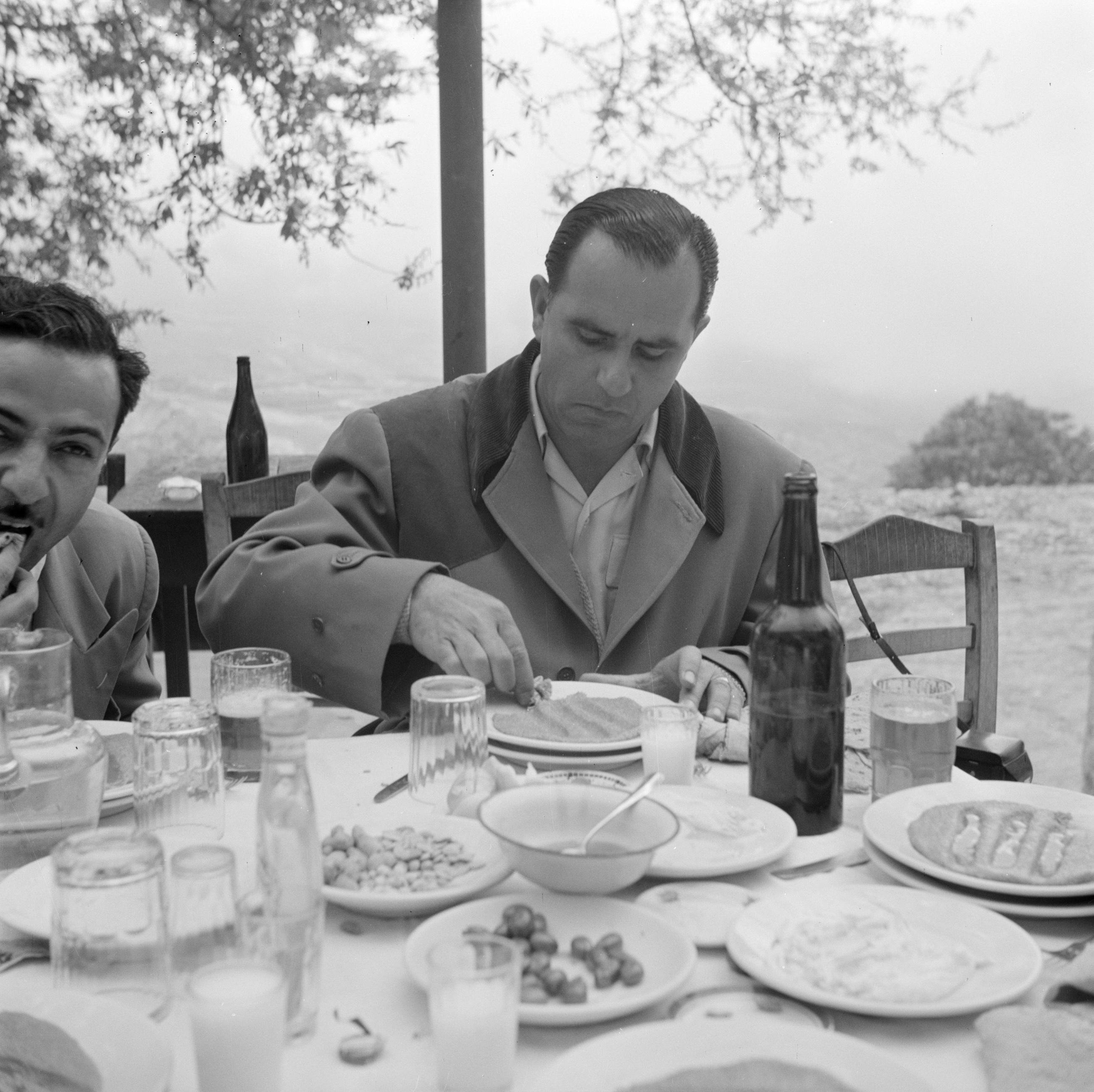
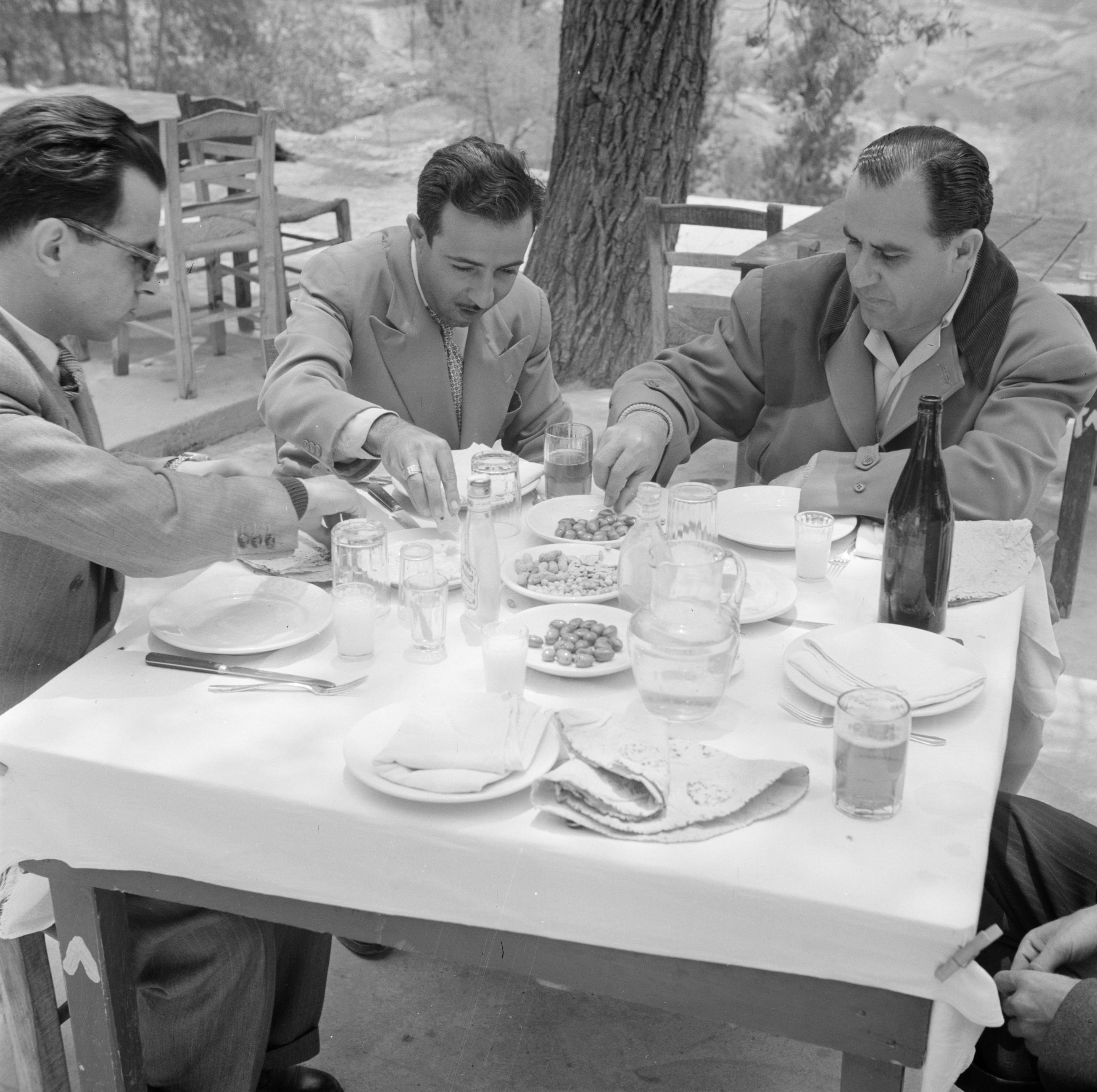
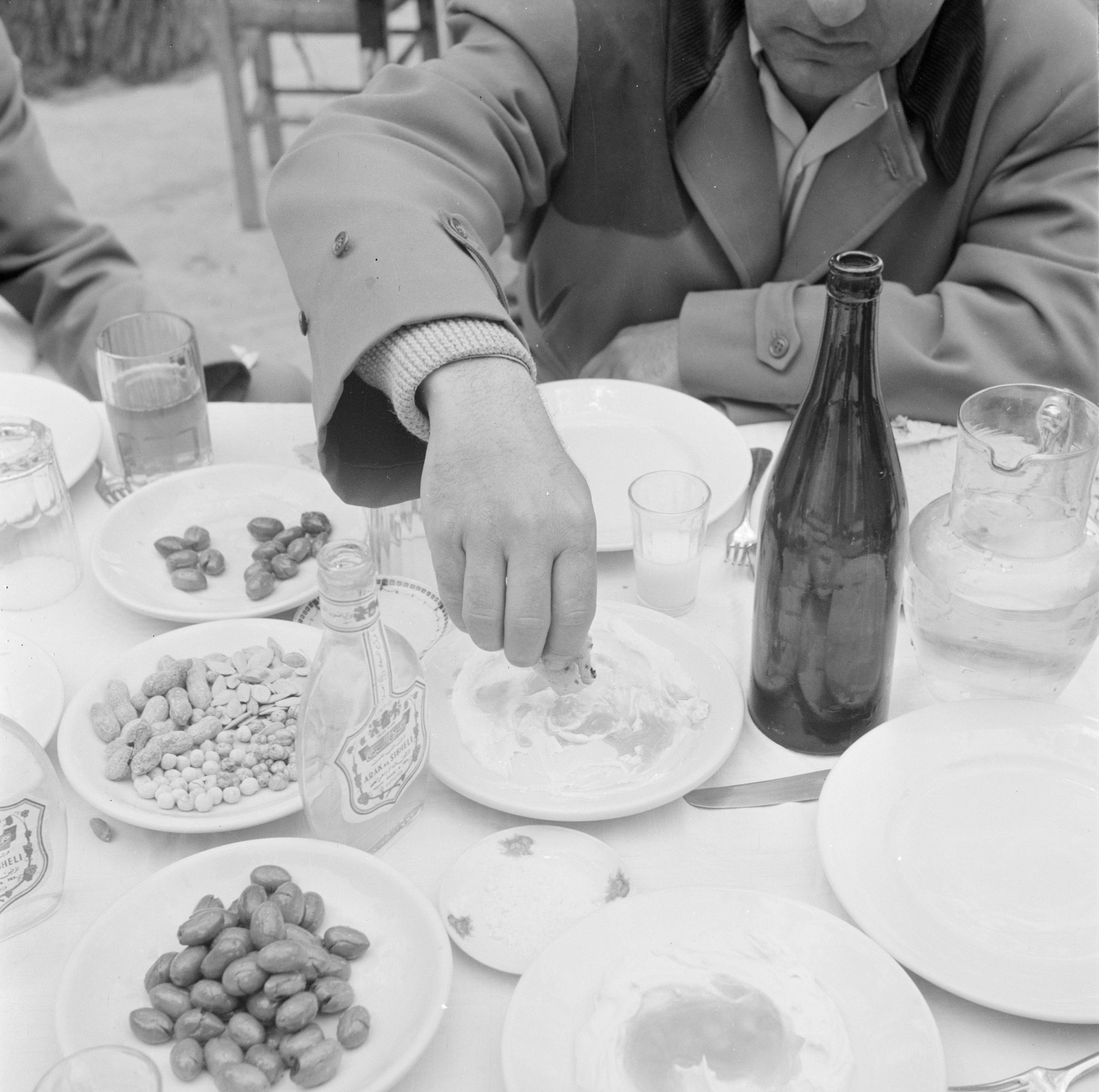
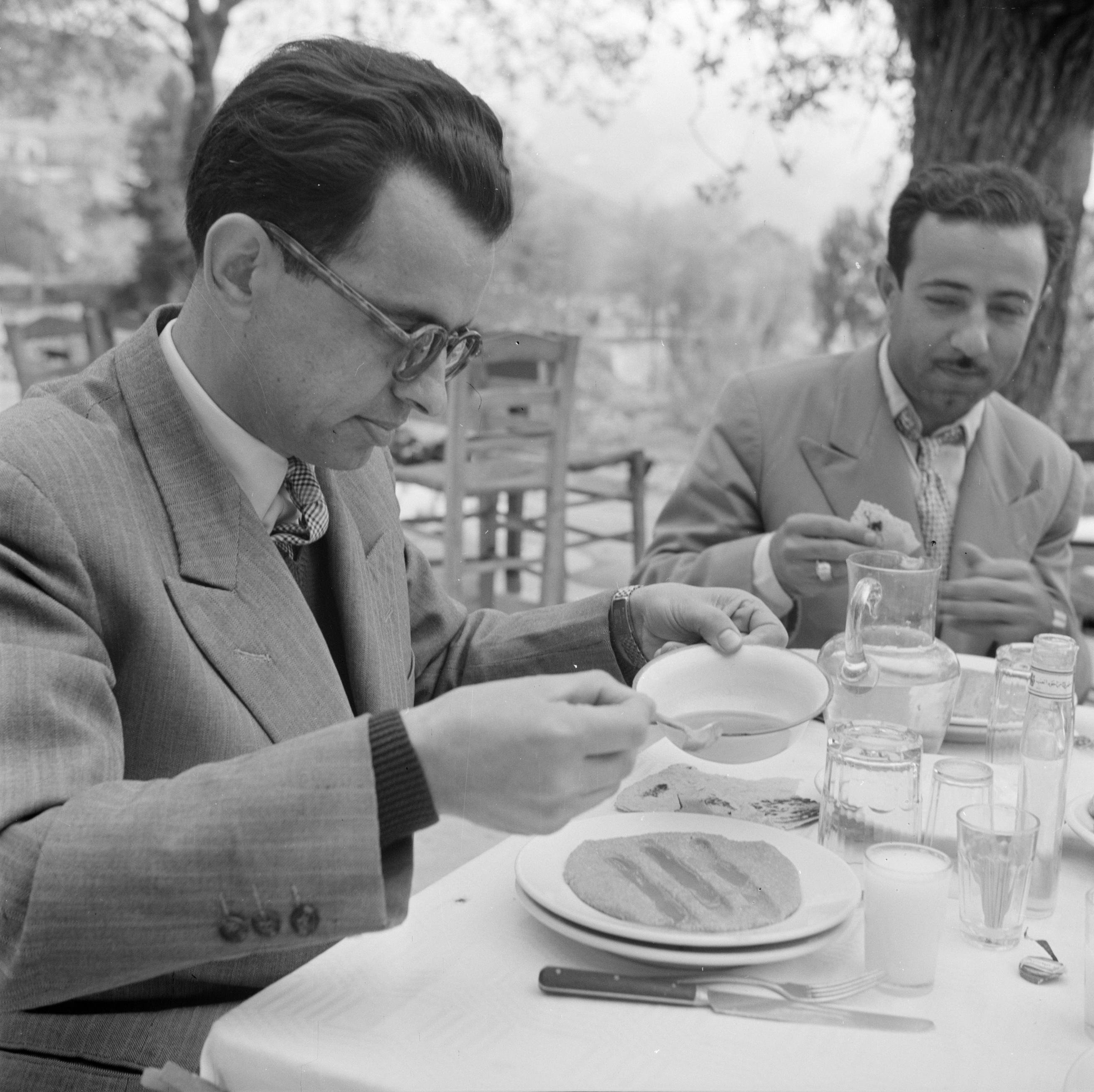
Typical Lebanese dining, with mezze and arak, taken at a restaurant in Beirut, Lebanon, 1950

In Lebanon, very rarely are drinks served without being accompanied by food. Similar to the tapas of Spain, mezeluri of Romania and aperitivo of Italy, mezze is an array of small dishes placed before the guests creating an array of colors, flavors, textures and aromas. This style of serving food is less a part of family life than it is of entertaining and cafés.

Mezze may be as simple as raw or pickled vegetables, hummus, baba ghanouj and bread, or it may become an entire meal consisting of grilled marinated seafood, skewered meats, and a variety of cooked and raw salads and an arrangement of desserts. The assortments of dishes forming the mezze are generally consumed in small bites using a piece of flatbread.

A typical mezze will consist of an elaborate variety of 30 or so hot and cold dishes, which may include:

- Salads such as tabbouleh and fattoush
- Dips like hummus, baba ghanoush, and moutabal
- Kebbeh, kafta and falafel (fried chickpea balls)
- Some patties such as the sambusac
- Stuffed grape leaves and pickles
- Roasted nuts, olives, and vegetables
- Condiments like toum and taratour, ideal for spread on sfiha

When dining as a family, the mezze typically consists of three or four dishes, but when served in a restaurant, the mezze can range from 20 to 60 dishes, served in 2 categories as regular mezze or seafood mezze; the variant combinations and dishes involved are plenty. Family cuisine also offers a range of dishes, such as stews (yakhneh) which can be cooked in many forms depending on the ingredients used; they are usually made with meat or chicken and served with rice. A notable type of stew is called bizella (peas) with rice.

Although simple fresh fruits are often served towards the end of a Lebanese meal, there is also dessert, such as baklava and coffee. When sweets are not available, fruits are typically eaten after meals, including figs, oranges and other citrus fruits, apples, grapes, cherries and green plums (janarek). Although baklava is the most internationally known dessert, there is a great variety of Lebanese desserts.

=== Food preservation ===
A distinctive feature of Lebanese cuisine is mouneh (مونة, from the Arabic manna, meaning "to store"), the seasonal preparation and storage of preserved foods for year-round use. Traditionally, households prepared staples such as bulgur, olive oil, labneh, tahini, pickles, jams, tomato paste, makdous, and awarma (lamb confit) during late summer and early autumn, when agricultural produce was most abundant. Historically, these preserves were stored in earthenware jars and canvas sacks in cool rooms or cellars, although they are now more commonly kept in glass jars or bottles. While many households purchase prepared mouneh from local producers, it remains common in rural areas for families to produce their own, sometimes using communal kitchens equipped for large-scale processing and preservation.

== Dishes and ingredients ==
Lebanese cuisine combines Turkish, Arab, and French cooking styles. Characteristics include the use of lamb (introduced by the Ottomans), the abundant use of nuts (especially almonds and pine nuts), and dressings made from lemon juice.

=== Bread ===
The Lebanese use bread, usually flatbread, as an integral part of a meal, and food is generally not served without it.

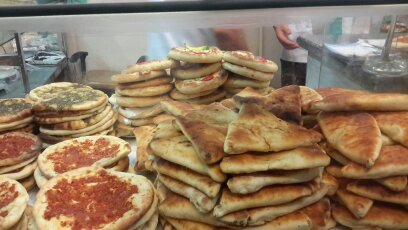
Variants of manaeesh and other bread presented in a Lebanese eatery

- Pita bread with a pocket, known as khubz Arabi (Arab bread), is widely popular, and may be cut or torn up to dip in various dishes or be stuffed as a sandwich or wrap with ingredients such as falafel or shawarma.
- Taboon bread is traditionally baked in a taboon oven or a tannur, and is similar to the various tandoor breads found in many parts of Asia.
- Marquq is prepared much thinner, almost paper-thin, and cooked on a metal saj or pan.
- Ka'ak is a common Lebanese street bread that is usually consumed as a snack. There are many variations of ka'ak, from being sprinkled with traditional sesame seeds to being stuffed with cheese and za'atar.
- Manaeesh (mini-pizza) is traditionally garnished with cheese (kashk, in its Lebanese version), za'atar, and spicy diced tomatoes, and may be eaten for breakfast. These are made in many variants in a number of local bakeries or furns. Some bakeries allow customers to bring their own toppings in order to build their own customized manaeesh for breakfast, lunch, and dinner. Variants include manakousheh za'atar (thyme pizza) and manakousheh jebneh, which has only cheese.
- Manaeesh dough can also be eaten with minced meat and onions which is called lahm bi 'ajin. Mini versions are called sfeeha. The same dough can be made into a triangular pie called fatayer, filled with spinach, onions, and sumac.

=== Dairy ===
Cheese, as well as yogurt and eggs, are used in the cuisine of Lebanon. One of the more recognizable dishes within Lebanon is labneh. Unlike regular yogurt, labneh is strained so as to remove the watery whey, leaving a thicker, creamier consistency. It is spreadable and garnished with olive oil and sea salt. It is an extremely versatile dish that can be served in a mezze platter for either breakfast or dinner. A variant is mixed with garlic. Ejjeh is the traditional omelette of Lebanon. It is made with egg, chopped parsley and scallions. Within Lebanon, people make this omelette with different herbs that are cultivated from their village.

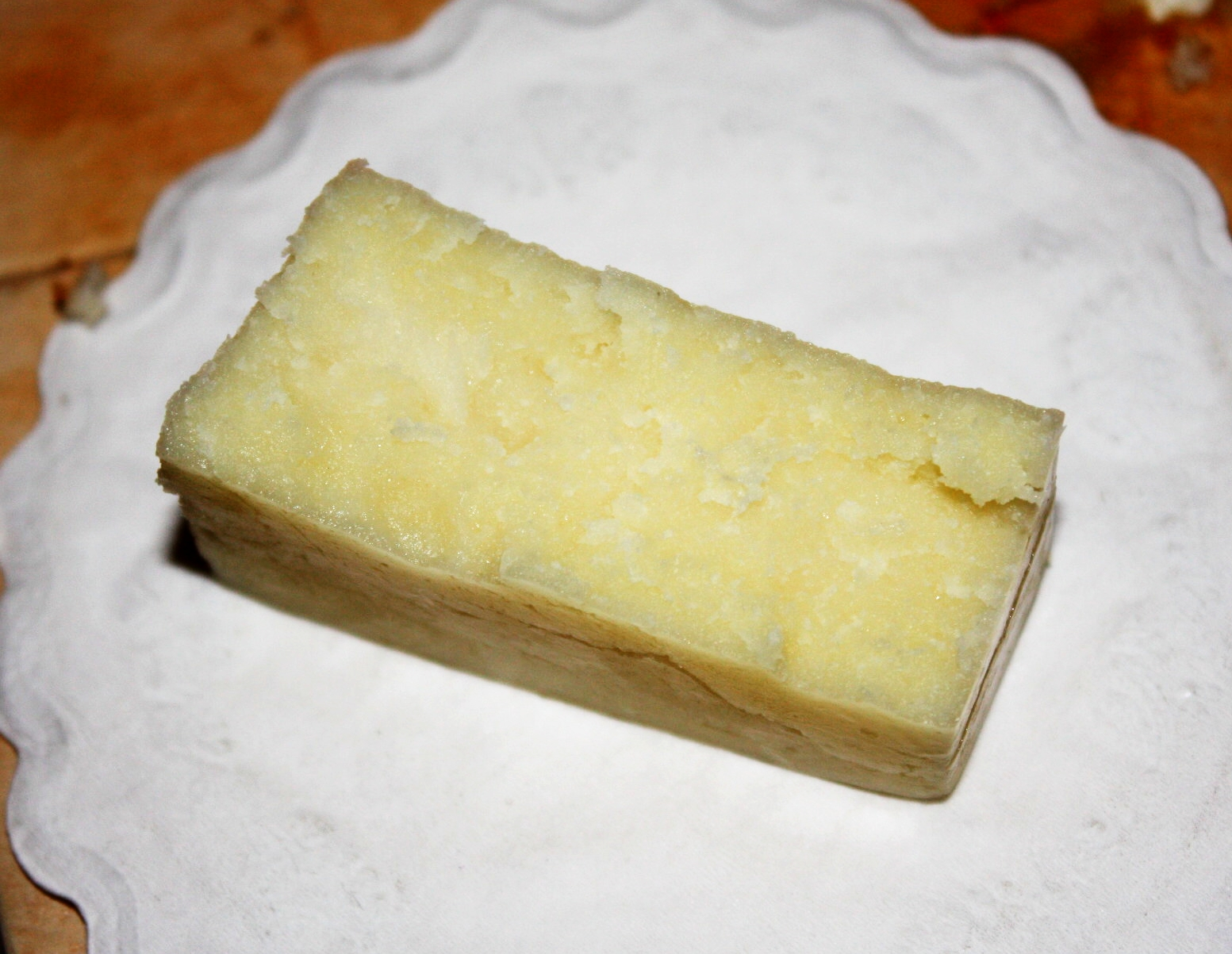
Kashkaval cheese originates in Balkan cuisine

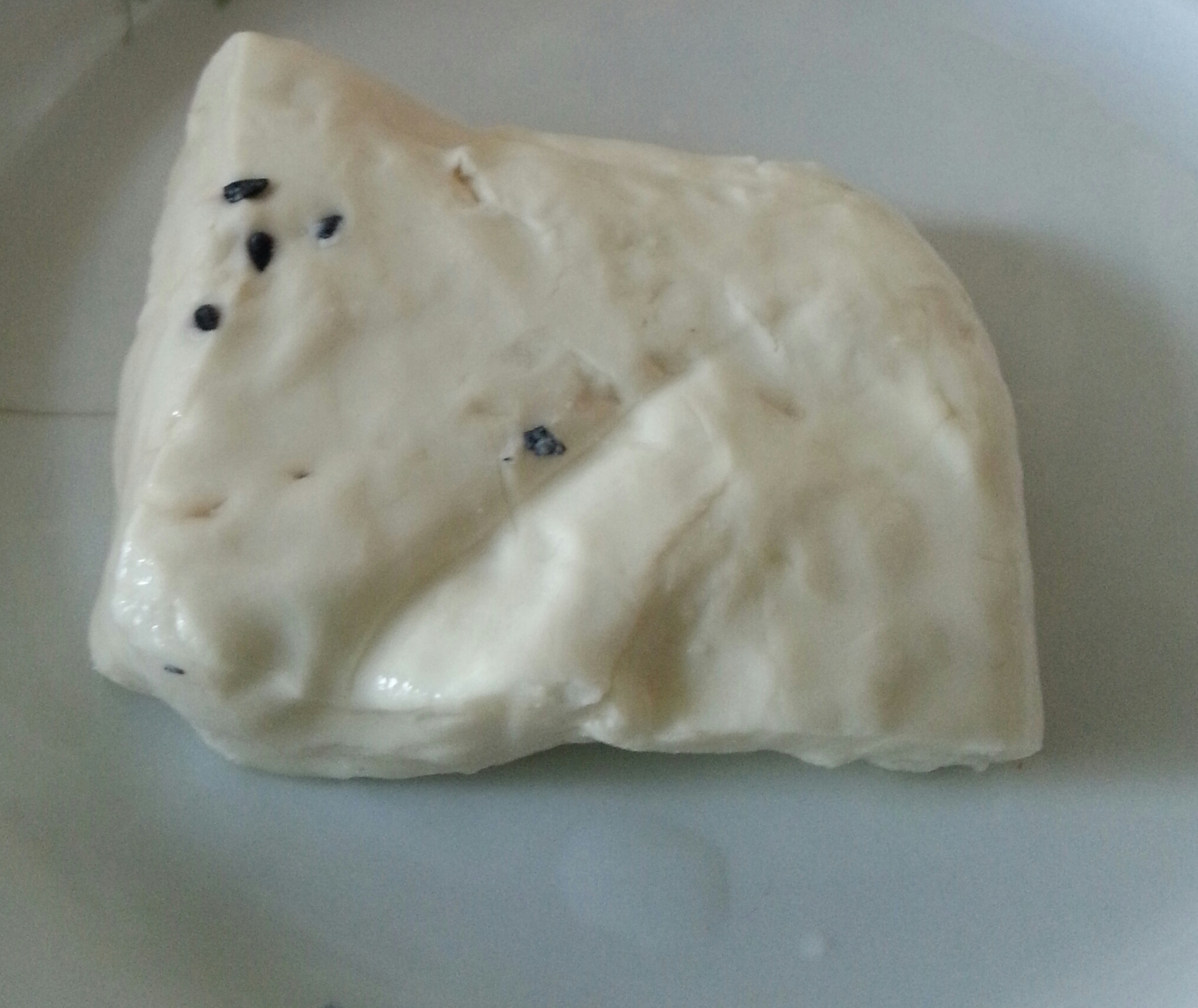
Nabulsi cheese is named after Nablus in Palestine

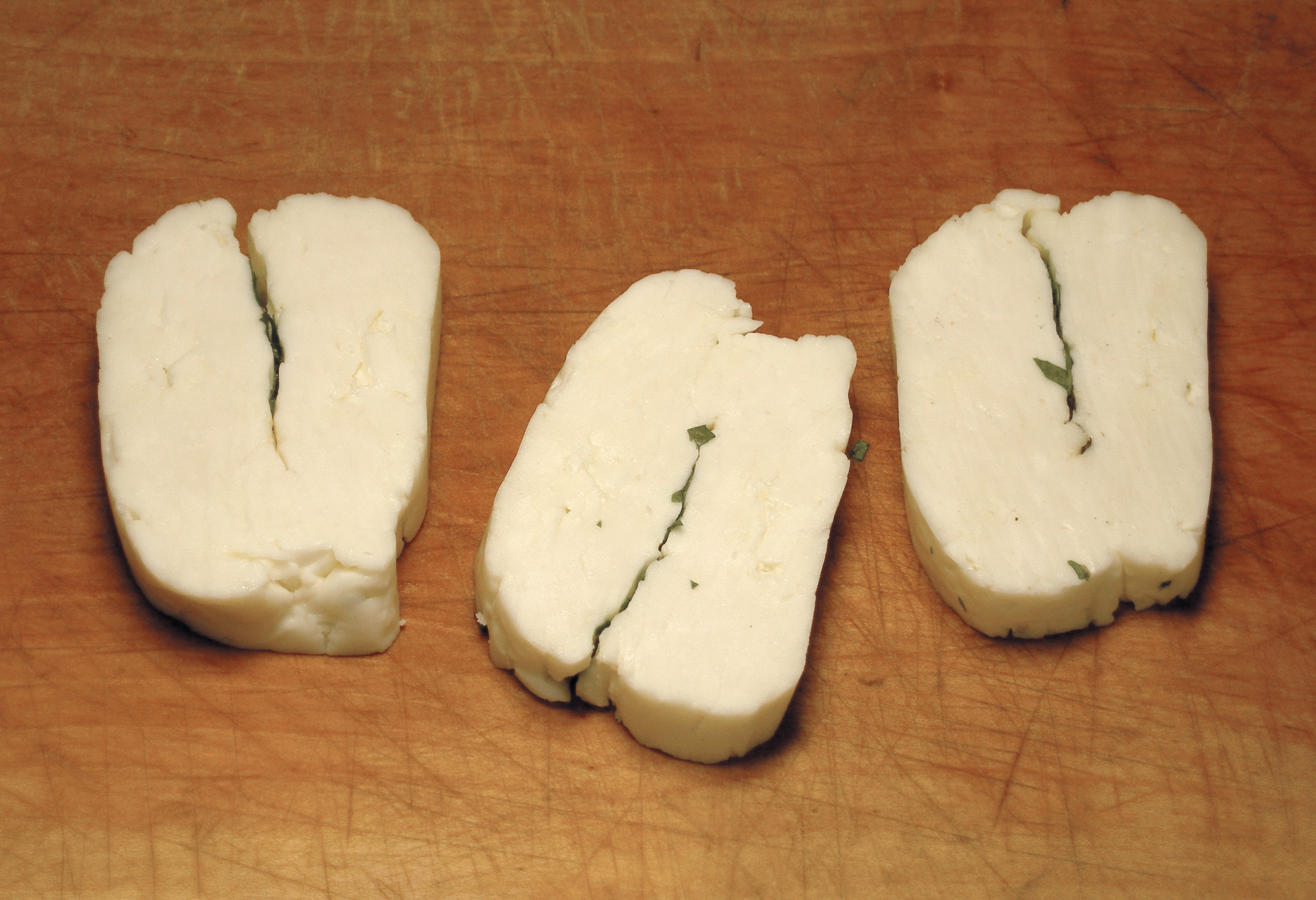
Halloumi cheese originates in Cyprus

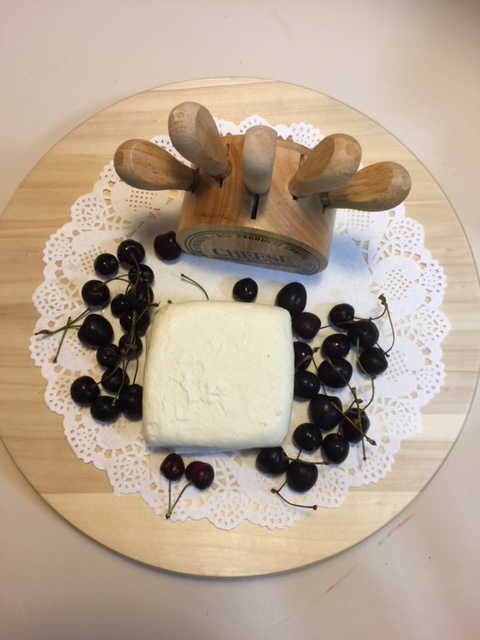
Akkawi cheese from the city Akka

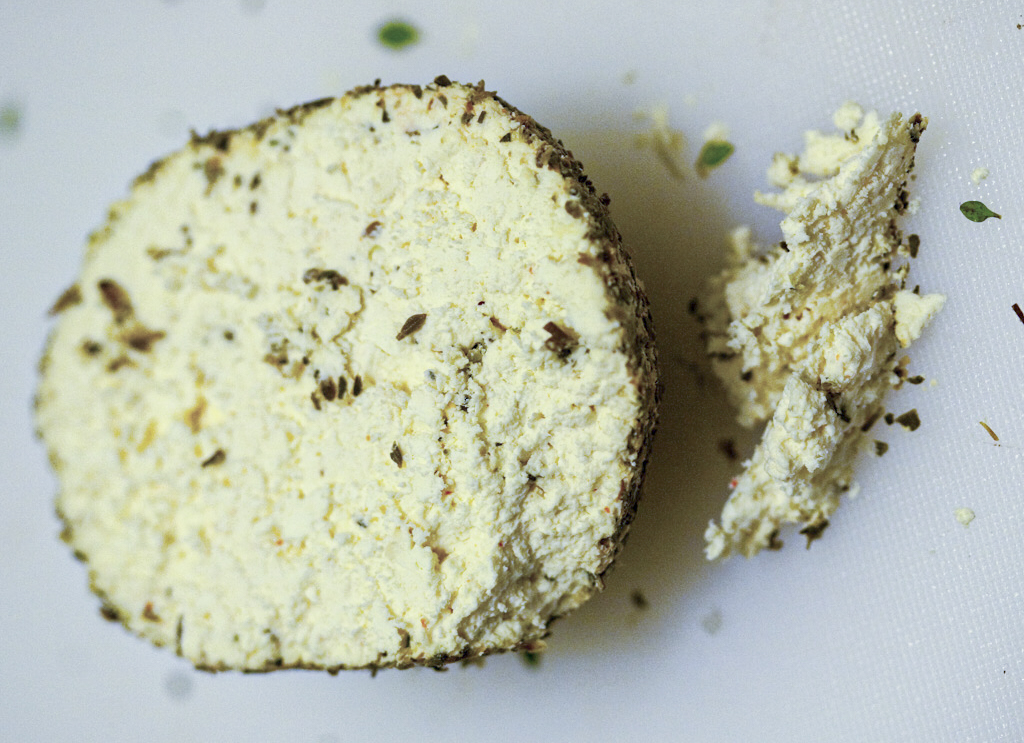
Shanklish from Levantine cuisine

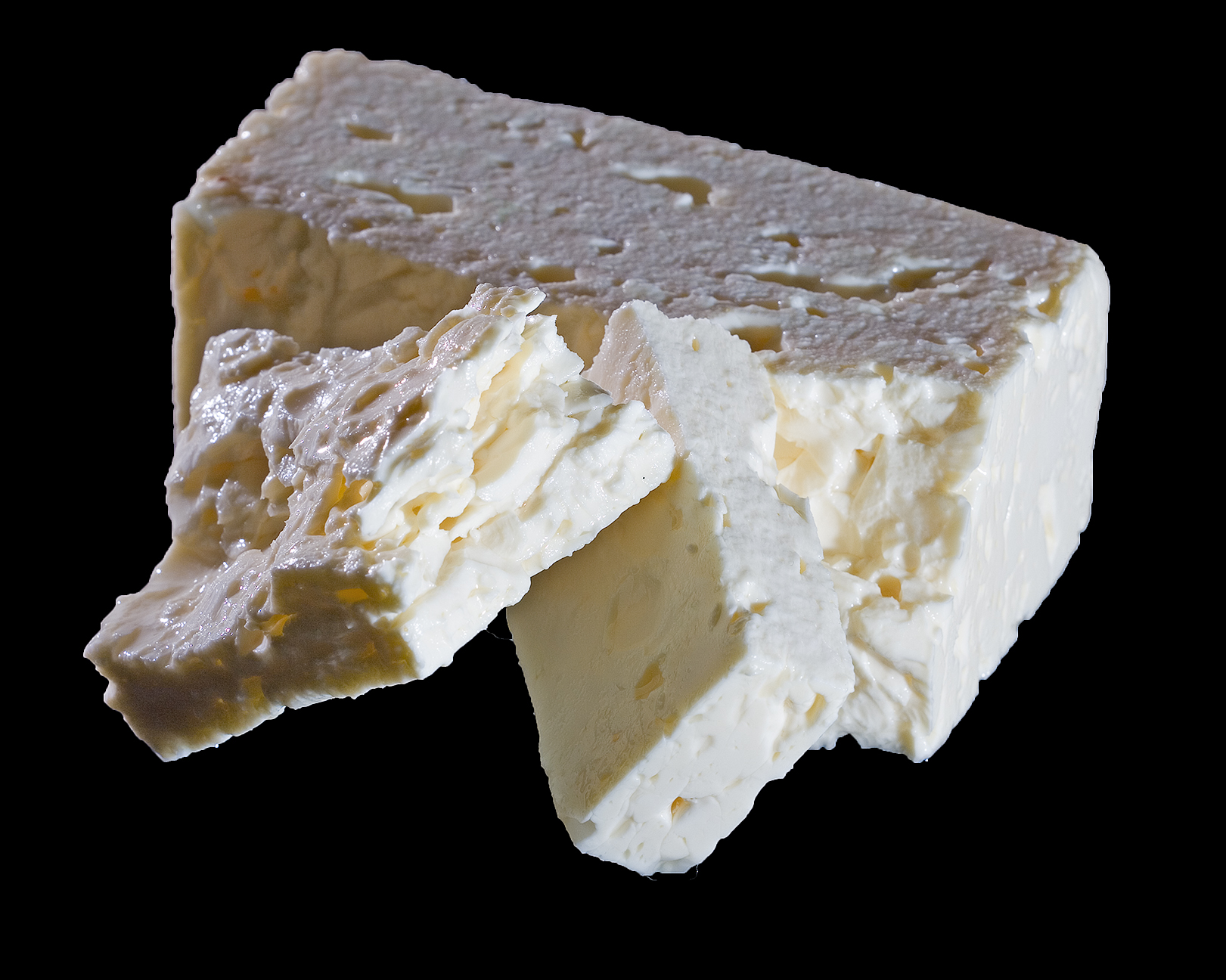
Feta cheese originates in Greek cuisine

==== Cheeses ====
- Ackawi (also akkawi) is a salty white cheese made from pasteurized cow's milk, but can also be made with goat's or sheep's milk.
- Baladi cheese has a mild yet rich flavor. It is called the "cheese of the mountains" since it is made in the high mountains by local shepherds in Lebanon.
- Darfiyeh is a goat cheese matured in a salty goat skin or "darf". It is a seasonal cheese, native to Lebanon's northern mountain villages of Ehden and Bcharre (and not to be confused with baladi cheese).
- Feta is used in salads and other dishes, although some cooks will use a milder cheese called jibneh baidha (simply "white cheese").
- Halloum is a semi-hard unripened cheese, perfect for grilling and frying. Along with akkawi it is traditionally stored in brine, giving it a strong, salty taste (though modern methods have allowed fresher varieties with less salt).
- Kashkaval is a cheese popular in many Eastern European countries that has made its way into Lebanese cuisine. It melts very quickly and is practical for pasta, pizza, and sandwiches.
- Nabulsi is similar to halloumi, made by boiling fresh ackawi cheese in a mixture of spices and seeds which are then fried, grilled, or eaten and used in the popular dessert knafeh, a cheese pastry soaked in a sugar-based syrup.
- Shanklish is made from cow's milk, salted, fermented, and seasoned with thyme and pepper, formed into cheese balls coated in red pepper chilli flakes.

=== Stews ===
Lebanese stews, often served with rice or flatbread, are made with ingredients found locally available.

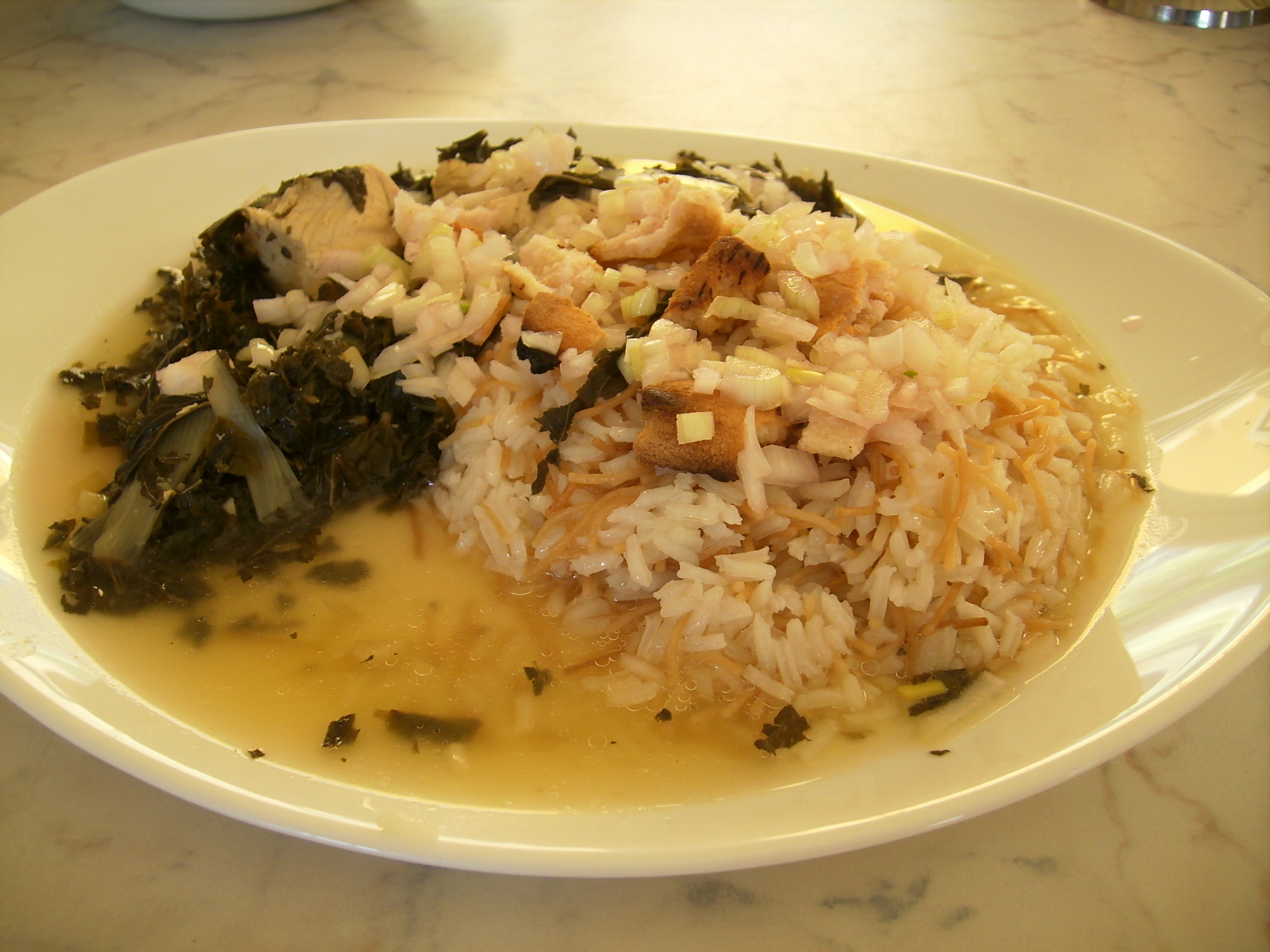
Lebanese mulukhiyah stew with chicken served with rice, vinegar, onions and toasted pita bread

- Bamieh bi-zeit (okra and tomato stew) is one of the most popular stews. Traditionally, it is served with rice and a basic salad dressed with lemon juice and olive oil, with fresh warm bread. This stew combines the distinct flavor of okra with a flavourful tomato sauce.
- Bamya bel lahmeh (okra and lamb stew) adds small sautéed pieces of filleted lamb.
- Abu shoushe is a taro and lentil stew.
- Yakhnet sabanikh is a spinach stew.
- Fasoulya hamanieh is a kidney bean stew.
- Makhlouta is made with a variety of beans, wheat, and legumes, and is popular in the town of Baskinta.
- Mulukhiyah is a stew with mallow leaves, chicken, beef topped with raw chopped onions and vinegar.
- Mjadrat fasoulya is a kidney bean and lentil stew popular in Rashaya.
- Mloukhiye b'zeit is a dish In northern Lebanon made using fresh leaves and shoots of the Nalta jute plant, cooked with olive oil, onions, garlic, tomatoes, and chilli peppers. It is a popular summer side dish, especially in Miniyeh-Danniyeh and Akkar districts.
- Mfaraket koussa (spicy zucchini stew) is one of the easiest and simplest ways to make use of the abundant summer zucchini.
- Daoud bacha is a meat-based stew and consists of beef meatballs (also lamb) with cinnamon, parsley, and stuffed with pine nuts in a tomato sauce.

=== Vegetarian ===
Vegetarian cuisine plays an important role in the cuisine of Lebanon. Being located in the Levant, vegetables and herbs (wild or cultivated) are abundant in the fertile landscape and serve as a main base of the cuisine. For Lebanese Christians, including Catholic (Maronites and Melkites) and Orthodox, fasting from meat is practiced over the Lenten period (from midnight to noon) during Easter. Where abstention of meat is observed, the food is referred to as akl aateh (meaning food "cut" from the diet, such as meat or absent from meat). The particular food that is "cut" varies over different traditions.

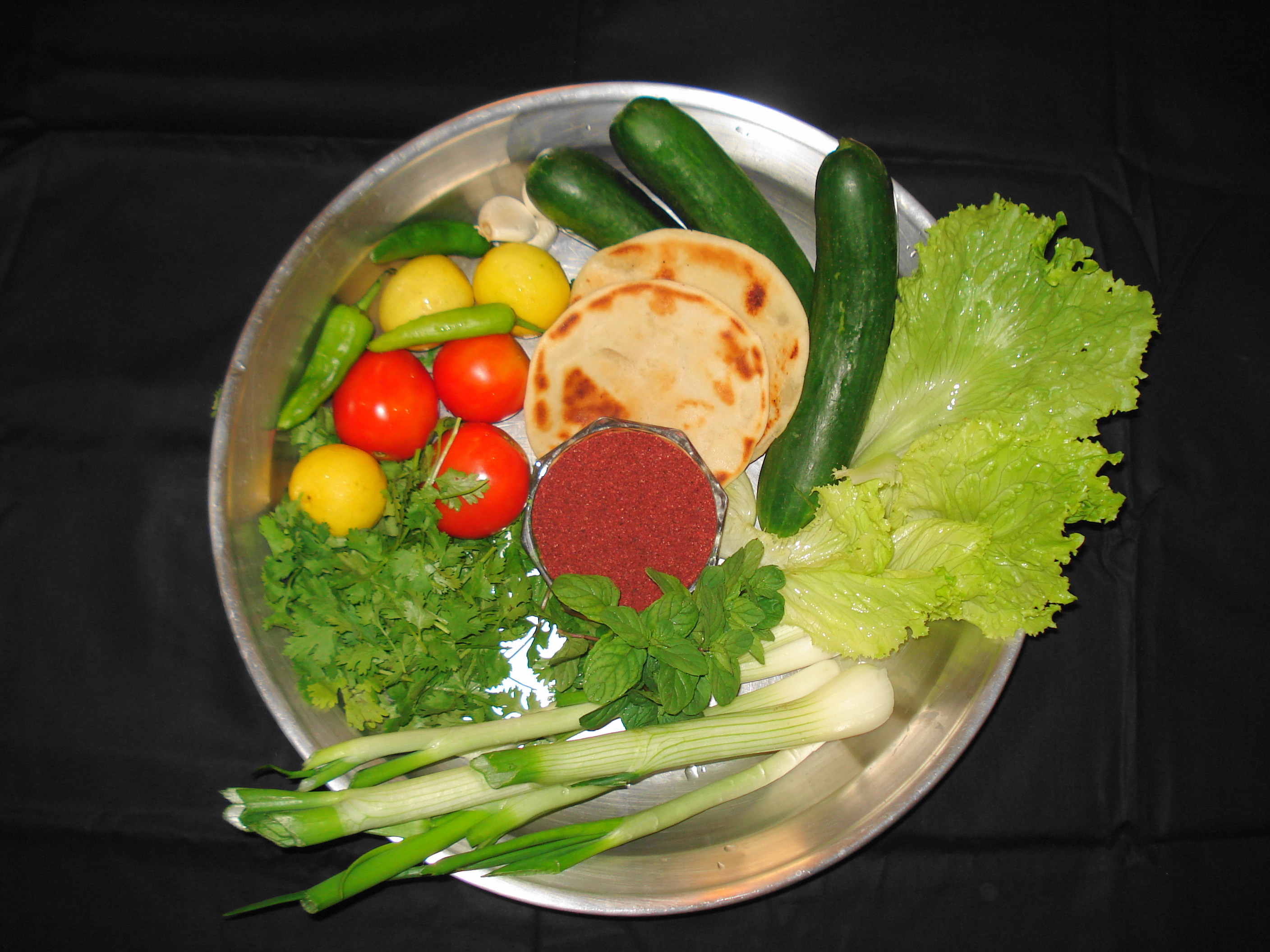
Ingredients for fattoush

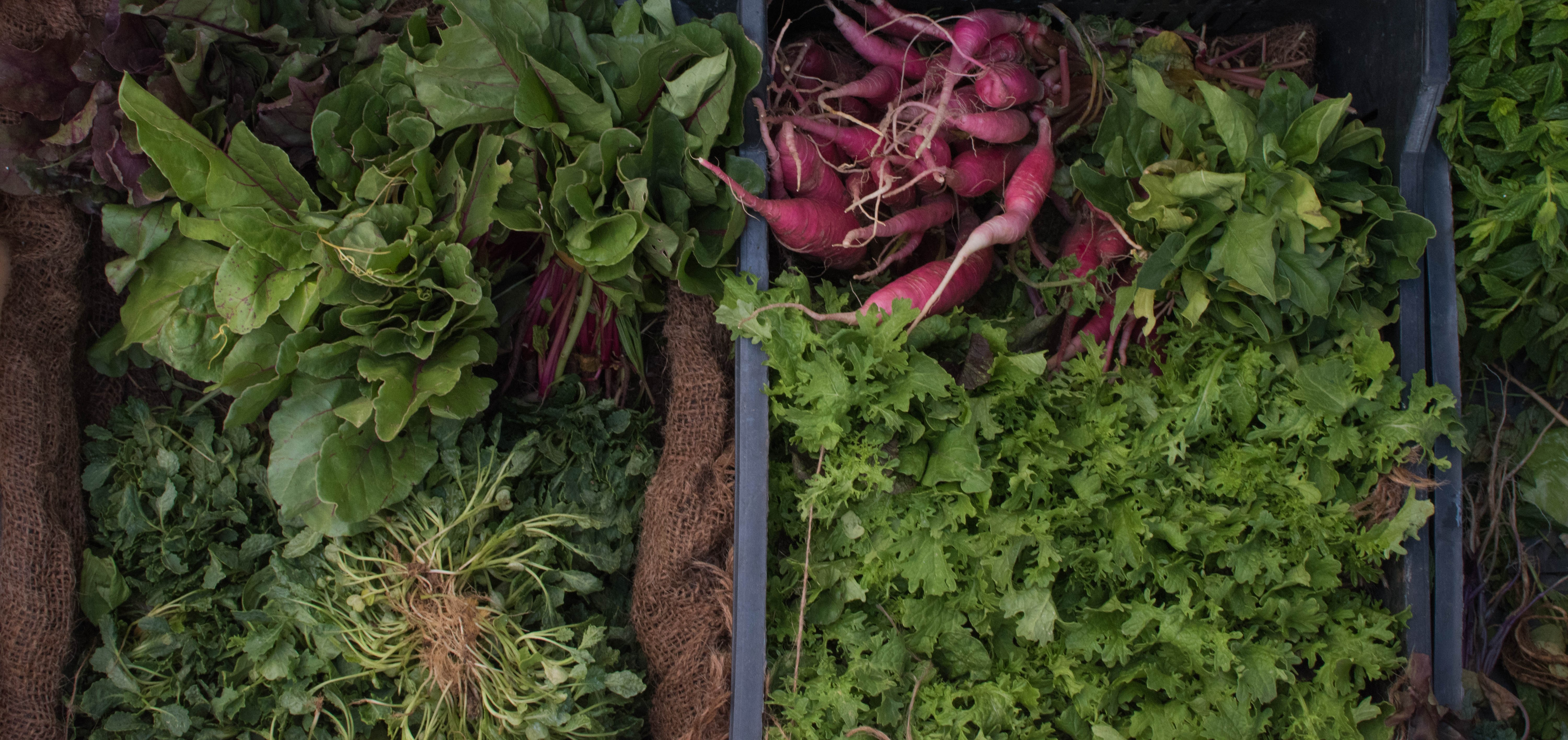
Vegetables including radishes for sale in a Beirut market

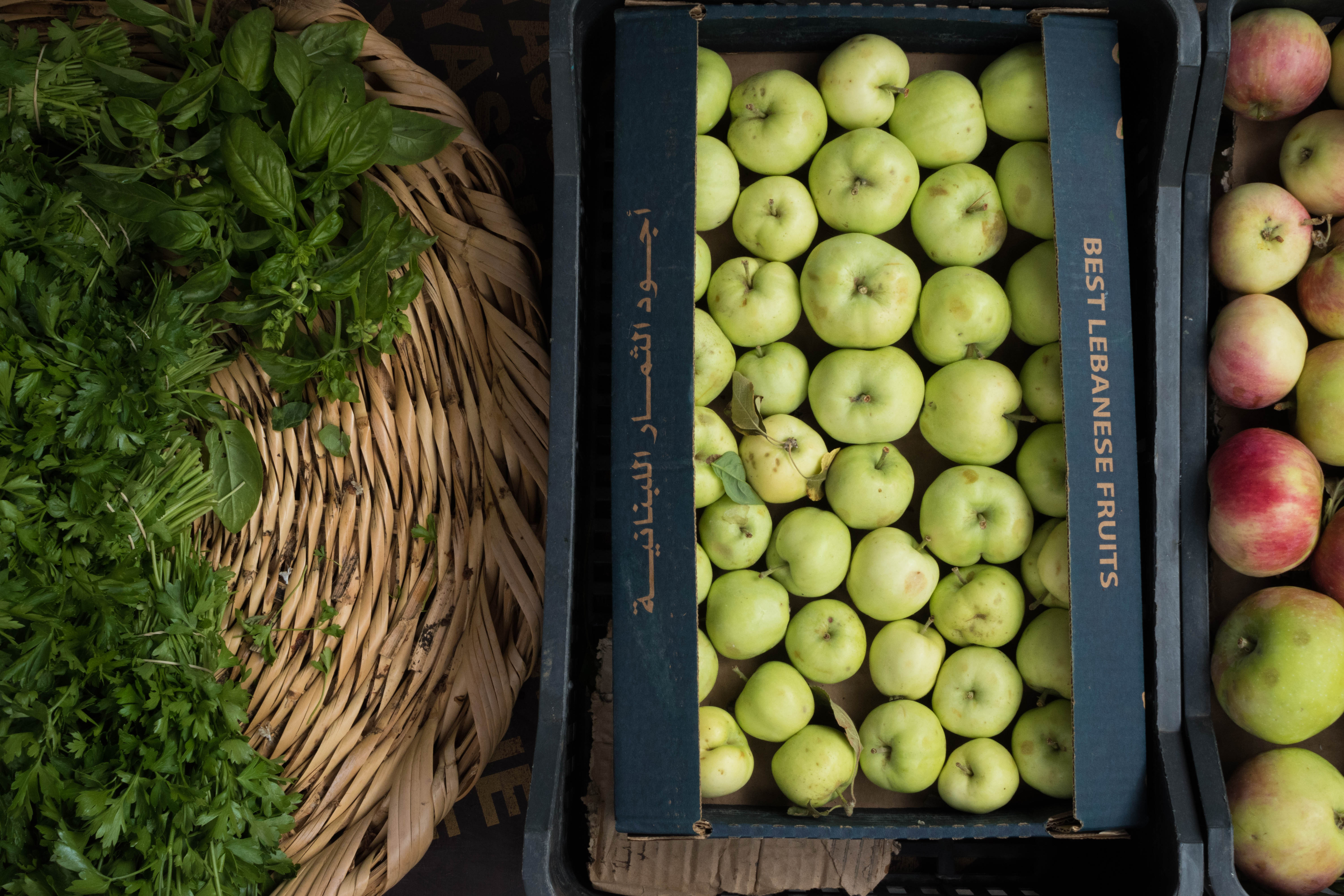
Fruits for sale including pears and apples

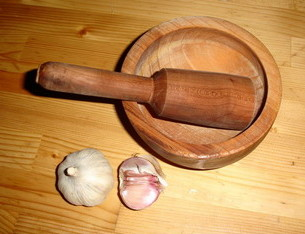
Traditional toum preparation

==== Salads ====
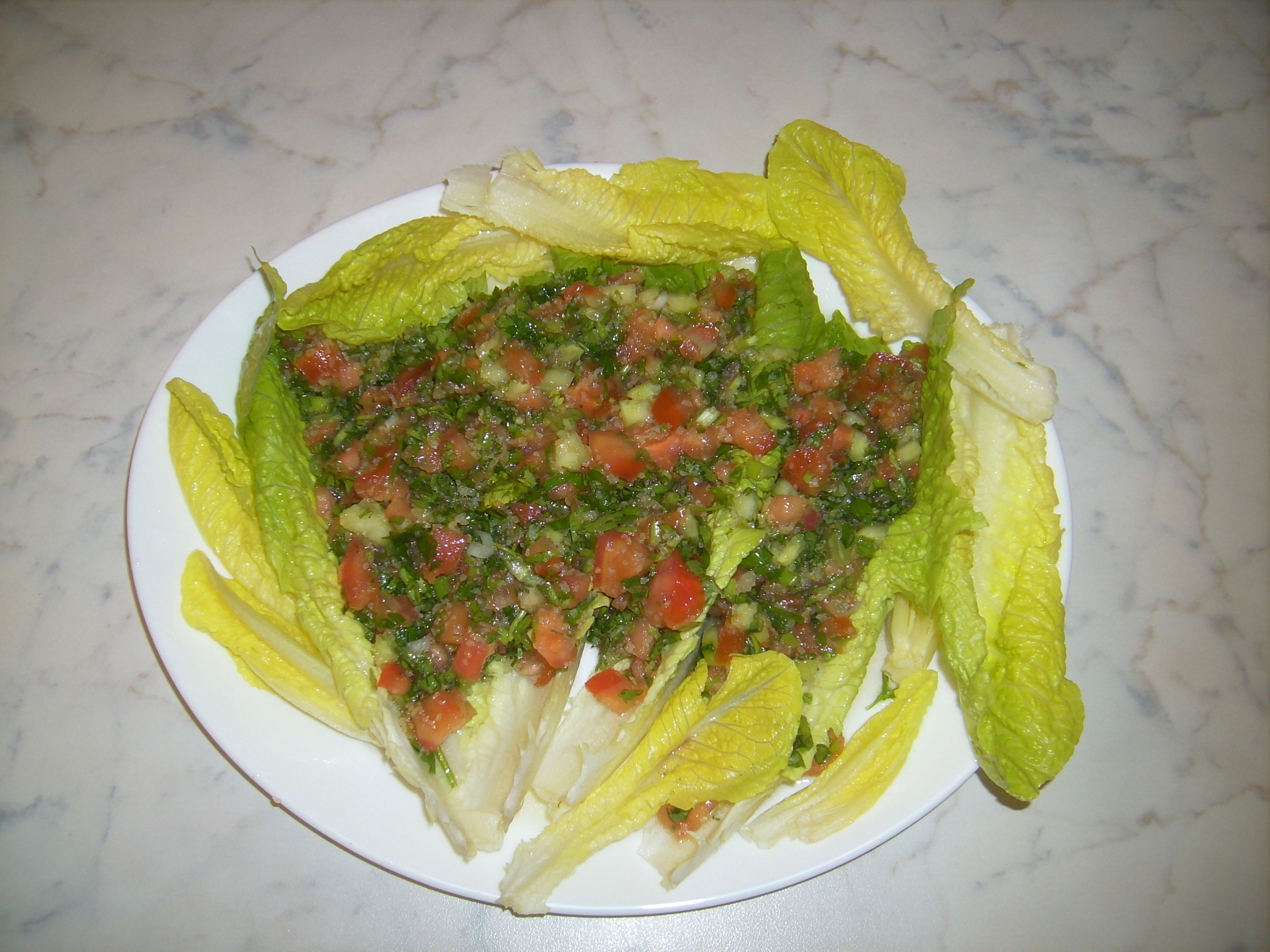
Ingredients for the Lebanese salad tabbouleh include parsley, bulgur wheat, olive oil, mint, lemon, tomato, salt, pepper, sumac and scallion

- Fattoush (also called "peasants' salad") is made with pita, cucumbers, tomatoes, chickweed, and mint.
- Tabbouleh is a diced parsley salad with bulgur wheat, tomato, and mint, and served with lettuce. It is eaten within a mezze, or as a standalone dish as a precursor to a main course.
- Yogurt cheese salad consists of shanklish balls (yogurt cheese, feta, chilli powder, thyme, cumin, salt, and pepper) added to a freshly prepared salad. It is distinctively Lebanese as is a perfect addition for mezze, complementing Arab and Lebanese wines.

==== Stuffed dishes ====
- Wara' enab is a dish commonly served as a mezze (appetizer), stuffed with either rice and meat or just rice.
- Kousa mahshi consists of various kinds of squash or zucchini stuffed with rice and sometimes meat and cooked on the stovetop or in the oven.

==== Chickpea-based dishes ====
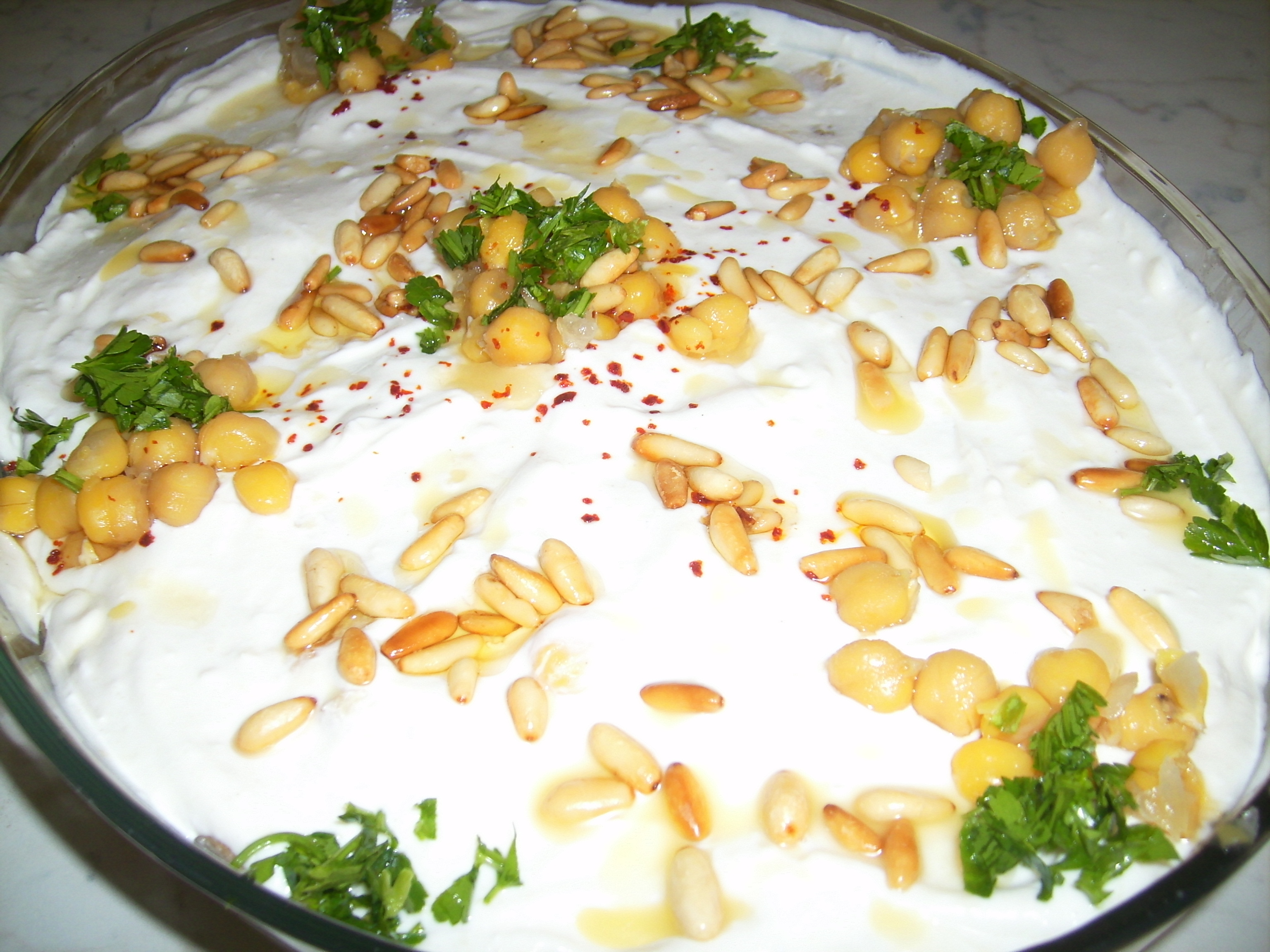
Lebanese fatteh b'hummus

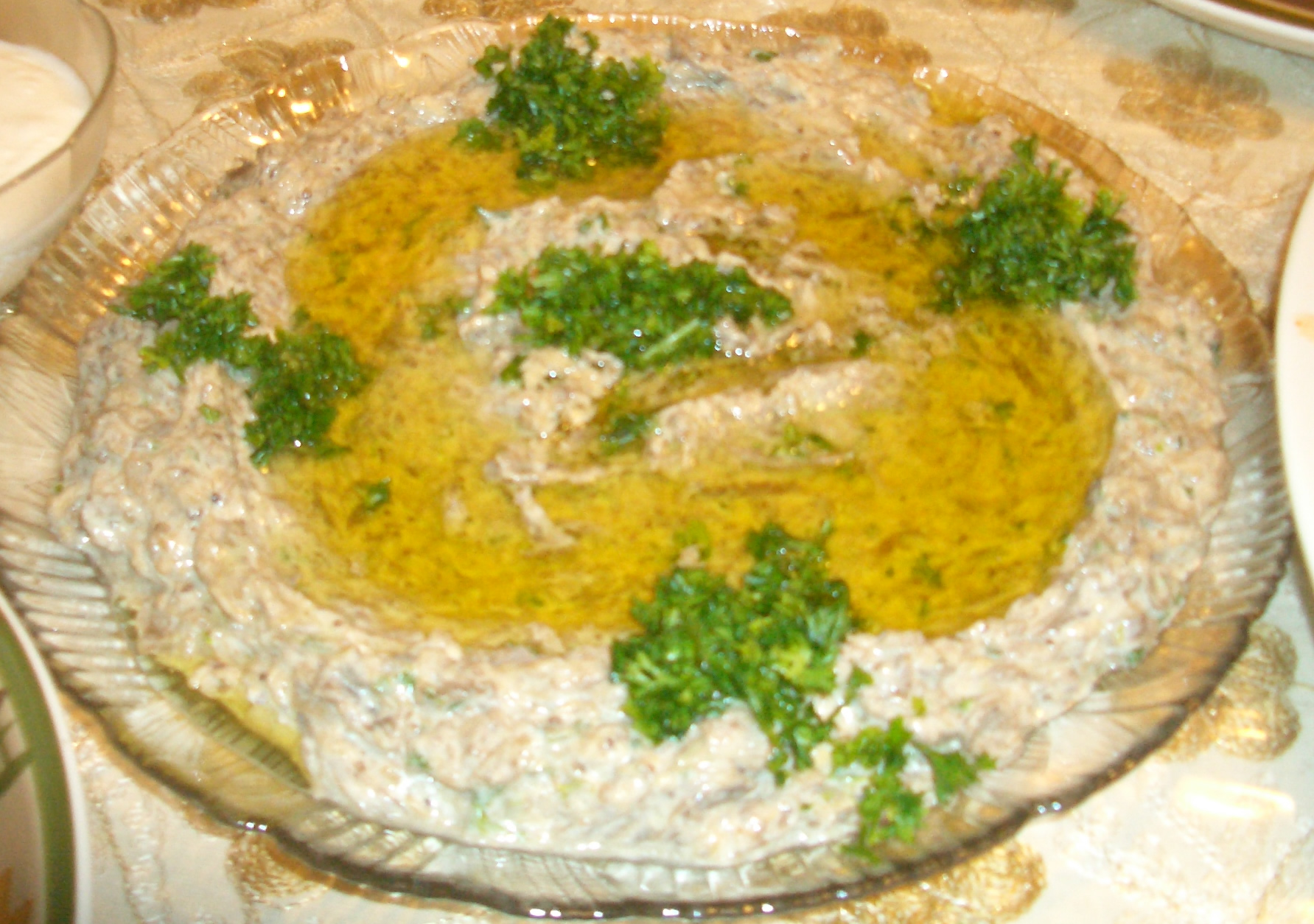
Mutabbel mashed cooked aubergines (eggplants) and tahini

- Falafel is a dish of deep-fried balls or patties made of highly spiced ground chickpeas, though some variants contain broad beans or fava beans.
- Hummus is a popular dip for pita bread made of blended chickpeas, sesame tahini, lemon juice, and garlic.
- Hummus bi lahmeh is a hummus plate with small meat cubes and roasted pine nuts on top, decorated with paprika.
- Fateh b'hummus is a dish of chickpeas, flatbread pieces, and spiced yogurt.
- Balila is a simple yet popular chickpea dish that has been boiled along with lemon juice, garlic, and various spices.

==== Aubergine-based dishes ====
- Baba ghanouj is char-grilled aubergine, made with tahini, olive oil, lemon juice, and garlic puree.
- Mutabbel is mashed cooked aubergines and tahini, mixed with salt, black pepper, and olive oil, and topped with anar seeds.
- Makdous is a stuffed aubergine dish served with olive oil.
- Fried aubergine is served alongside other fried vegetables including potatoes, cauliflower, courgettes (zucchini), onions, and tomatoes, usually referred to as a "mixed fry-up".
- Fatteh is one of the most popular dishes in the Levant, and the variant fatet batinjan (aubergine casserole) is served with yoghurt, fried bread, aubergine, and maté.
- Moussaka, unlike the Greek style, is a vegetarian aubergine dish, made with fried aubergine simmered in an onion and tomato sauce with chickpeas.

==== Bean and legume dishes ====
- Ful (Lebanese-style) is a slow-cooked mash of fava beans, sometimes with chickpeas, dressed with lemon, olive oil, and cumin.
- Riz bil-foul is another dish with fava beans, seasoned with various spices and served with rice.
- Mujaddara (imjaddarra) is a popular dish found throughout the Middle East and consists of cooked lentils and rice, garnished with sauteed onions and served with a salad or Lebanese bread.

=== Meats ===
Lebanese meat dishes are usually made with chicken, lamb, or beef, though pork is also eaten (albeit not as widely, due to Islamic dietary laws). Meat was traditionally precious and usually served on the weekend. It is sometimes eaten mixed with bulgur to prolong the shelf life.

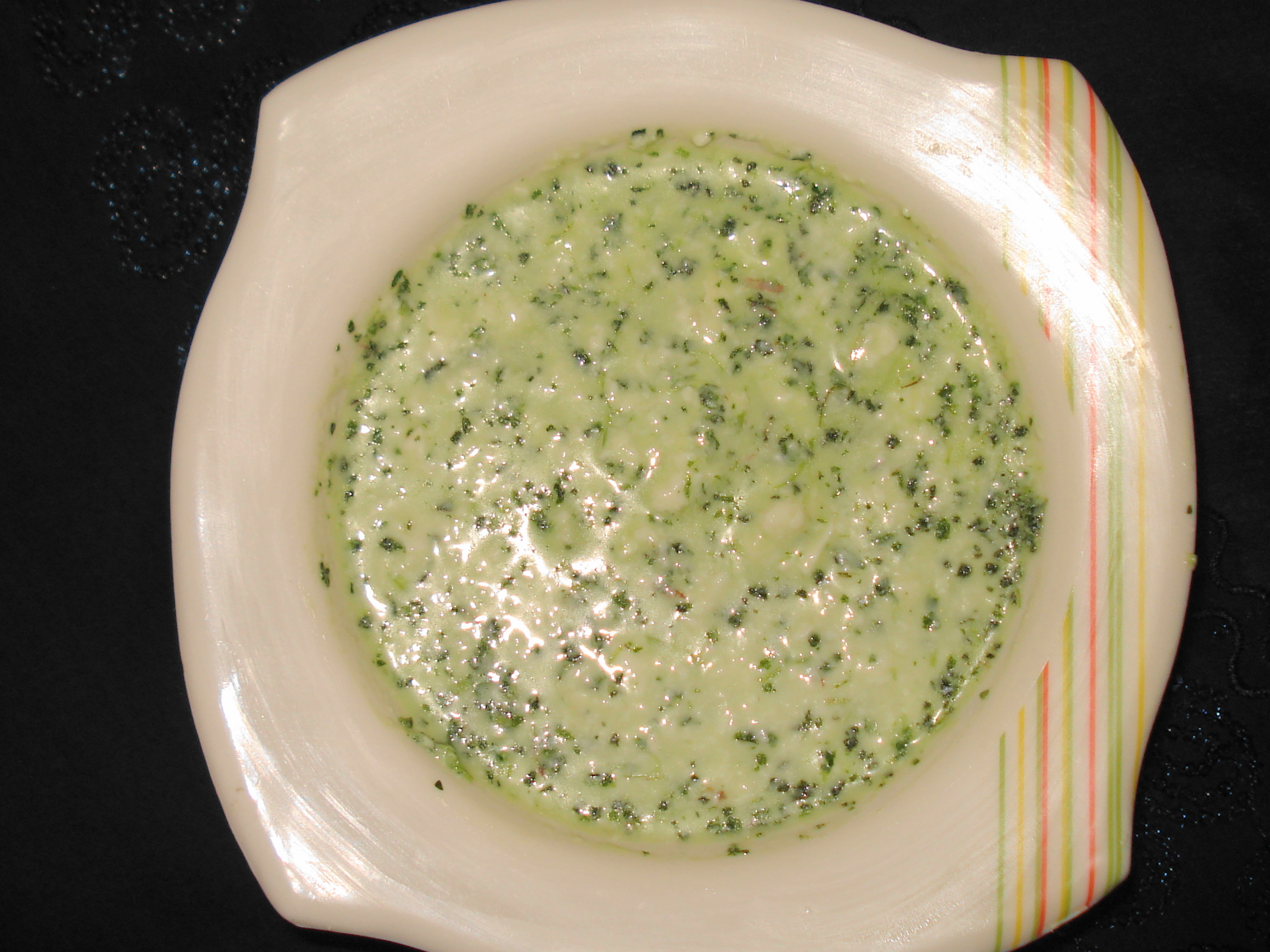
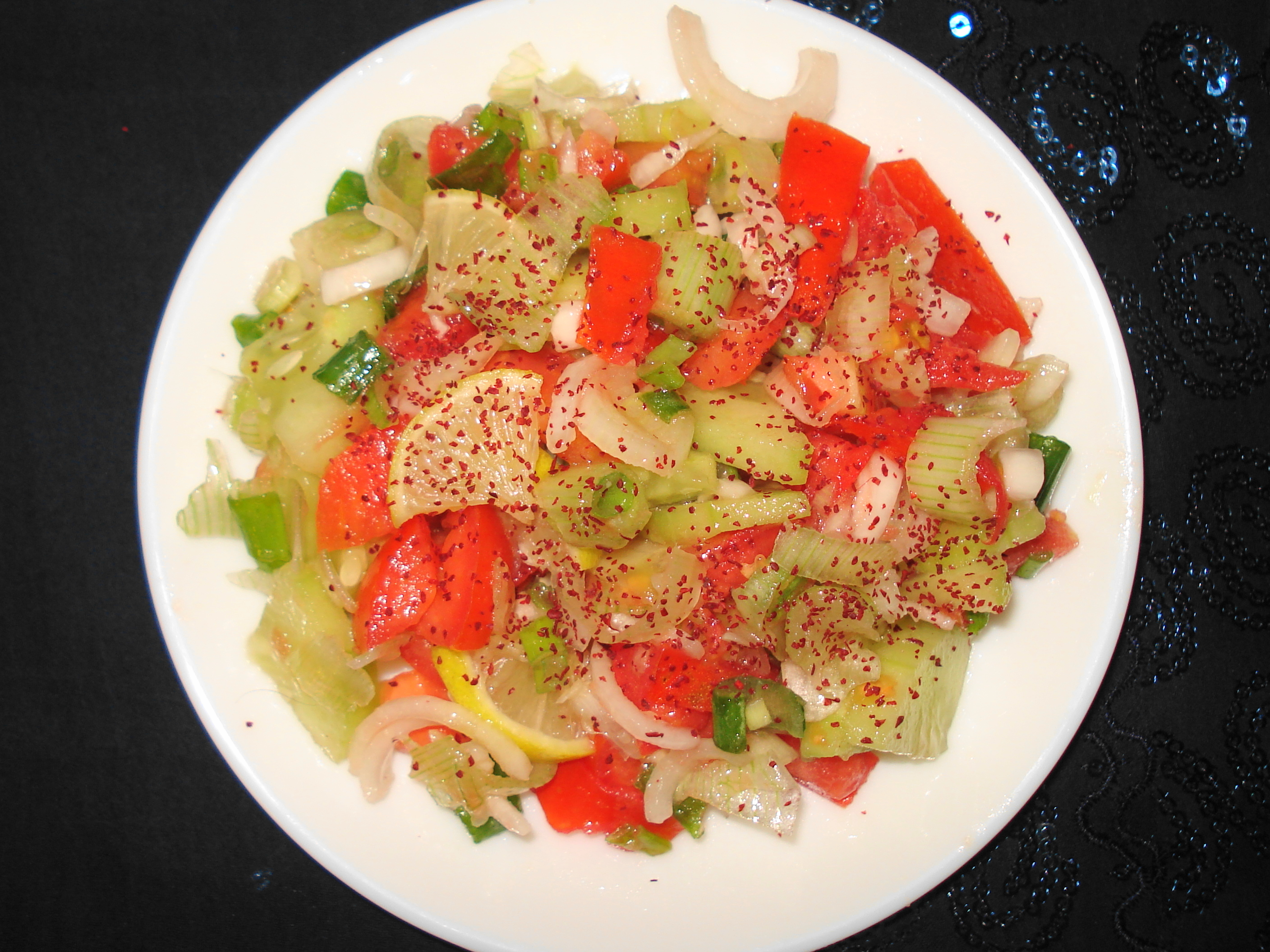
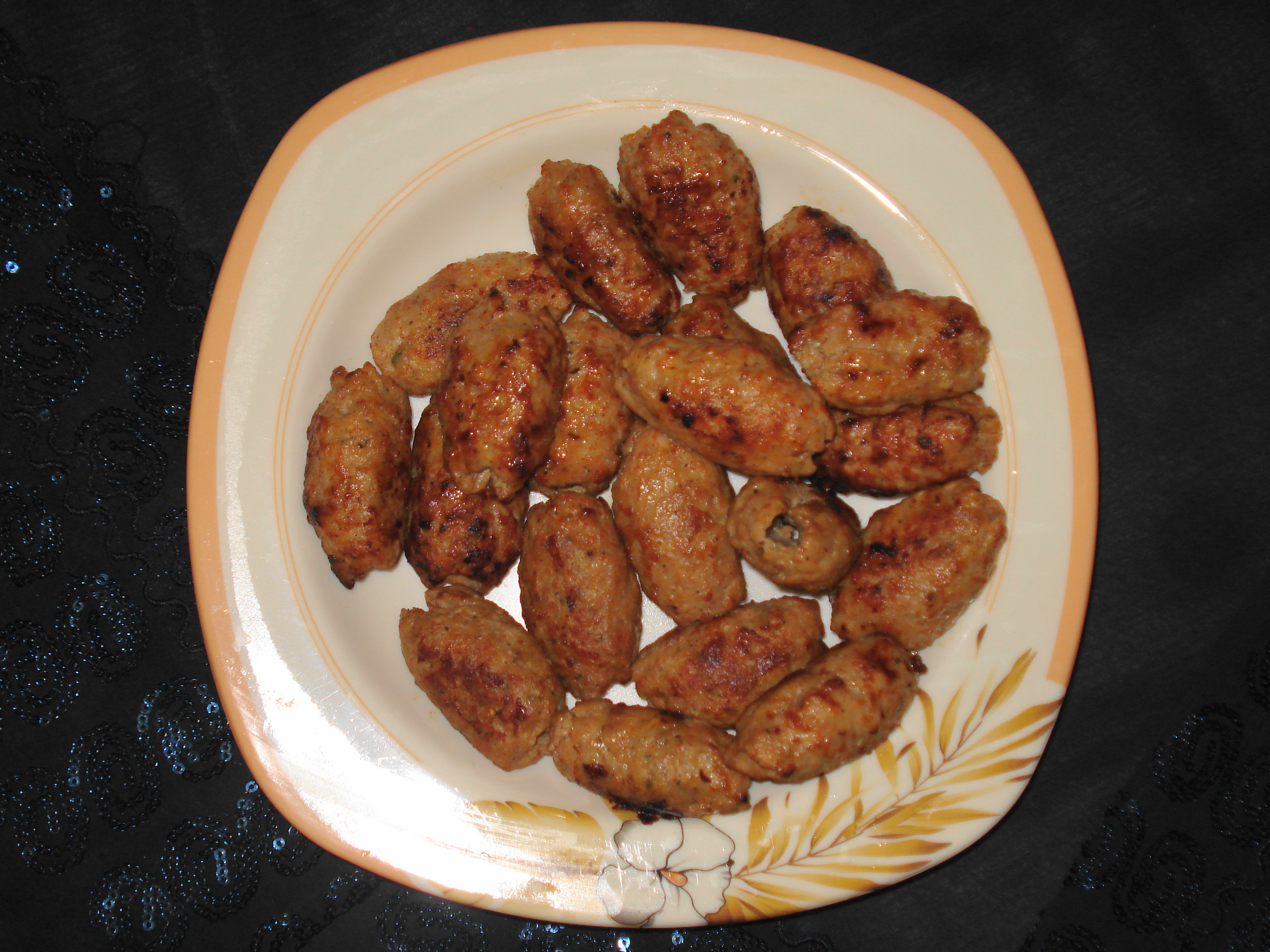
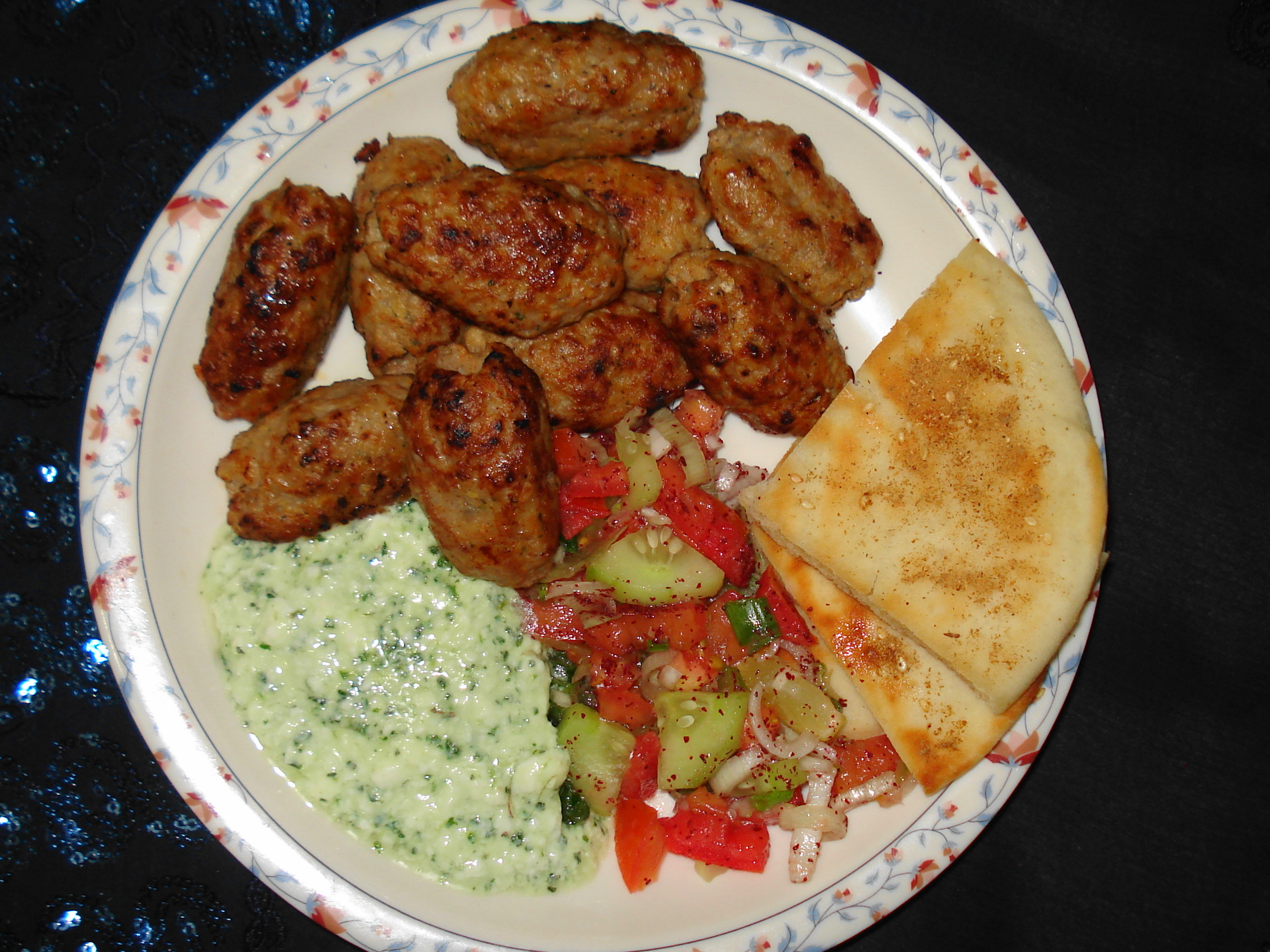
Raita, salad with sumac, kafta, and a prepared plate of kafta with sides

==== Mixed meat ====
- Shawarma is a commonly found form of street food made with slow-cooked skewered meat (either chicken, lamb, or beef) that is thinly sliced and served as a sandwich with toppings such as onions, pickles, and tomatoes. Styles of this dish include shawarma lahmeh, grilled meat with parsley, onion and tarator, and shawarma djeij which is grilled poultry with toum and lettuce.
- Sambousek (also called samboosak, or sambousak bi-lahm) is a small stuffed pastry often filled with meat and served as an appetizer (mezze). Though usually filled with ground beef or lamb, sambousek can also be filled with cheese, spinach, or other fillings.
- Kibbeh is a filled bulgur dough made with ground meat and can be made by being fried (kibbeh raas), uncooked (kibbeh nayyeh), or baked (kibbeh bil-saneeya); all may be served with yogurt. Some regional versions of kibbeh are a pumpkin-flavoured kebbe lakteen (popular in Beit Mery) and kebbe zghartweih which is an oven-cooked version popular in Ehden.
- Kafta is made with spiced ground meat that is shaped into small patties or rolled into meatball-shaped balls which are then baked, pan-fried, or charcoal-grilled on skewers. Kafta is served with bread and other side dishes.

==== Lamb ====
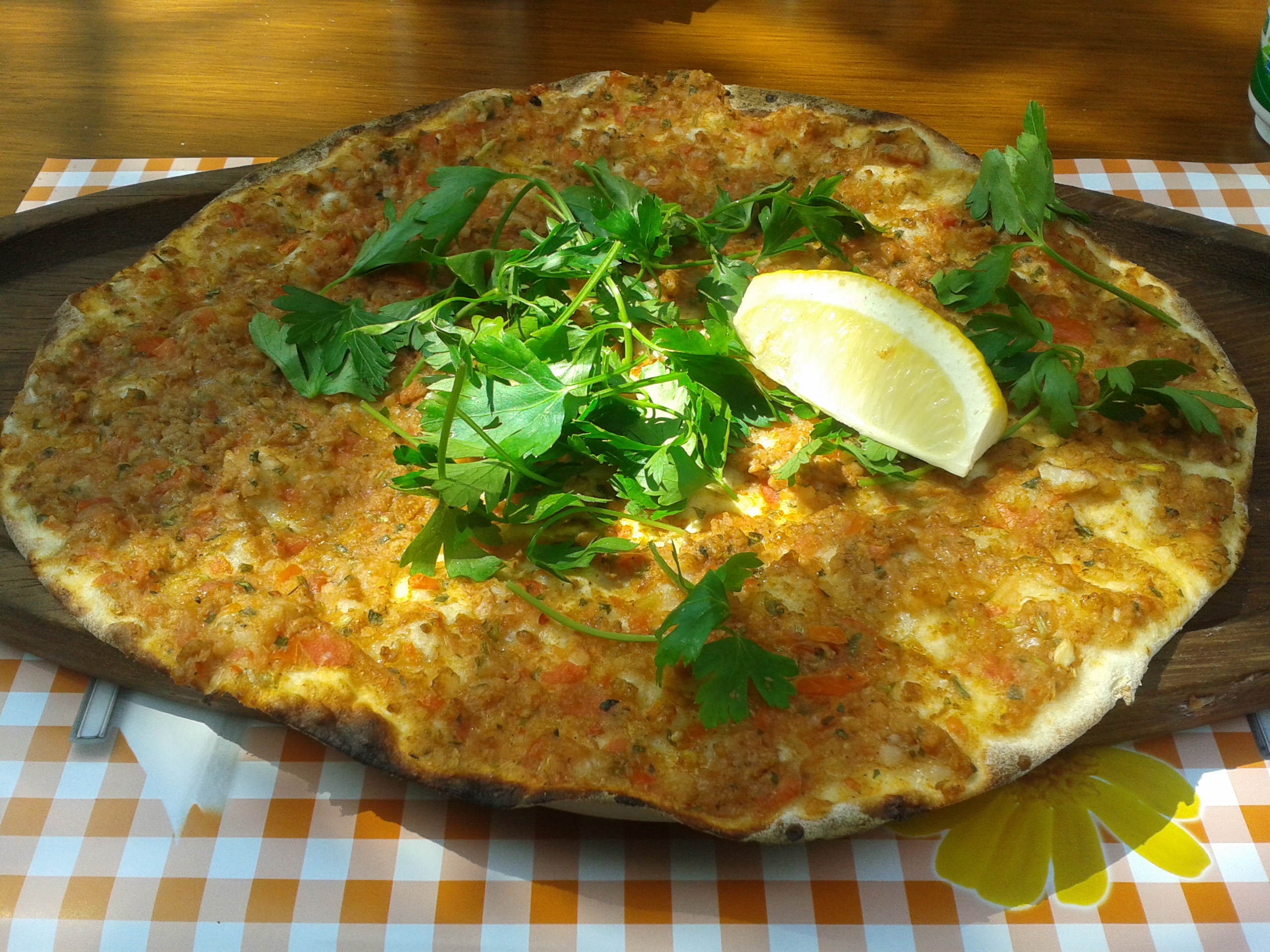
Lahm b'ajin

- Habra (raw lamb fillet) is essential for most dishes involving lamb. It is the foundation for many popular dishes including kibbeh nayyeh (minced raw lamb) and other variants of kibbeh. The fillet needs to be prepared and chilled for a minimum of 2 hours, and can even be prepared one day in advance.
- Dehen, somewhat like a meat shortening made from lamb-tail fat, fried lamb pieces, and spices, is often used to give dishes a light meaty flavour without the expense of bulk meat.
- Barout del batata is spicy lamb served with potatoes.
- Deleh mehshi is a stuffed rib cage of lamb (popular in Broummana).
- Laban immo is cooked yoghurt and lamb with rice (popular in Douma).
- Kafta meshwi is minced lamb mixed with finely chopped onion and parsley, broiled on a skewer over charcoal.
- Qawarma originates from a centuries-old custom that was to buy a fat-tailed lamb in the spring and force-feed it day and night with mulberry and grape leaves, wheat hulls and other ingredients ending in a succulent chopped lamb dish, salted and kept in the grease of the animal.
- Sfiha (also lahm b'ajin) are pastries covered with mutton minced meat, onions, and nuts popular in the Lebanese town of Baalbek.
- Shish barak (Lebanese ravioli) is meat dumplings in yogurt sauce.
- Khash is a dish of boiled sheep parts, which might include the head, feet, and stomach (tripe).

==== Chicken ====
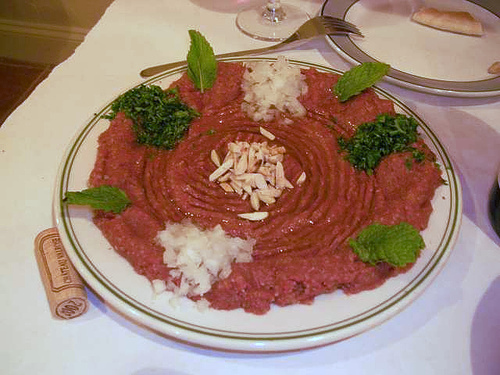
Kibbeh nayyeh

- Chich taouk is charcoal-grilled chicken marinated with garlic, lemon, and spices including cinnamon and cumin.
- Djaj meshwi is grilled spiced chicken on a BBQ, marinated with a garlic lemon sauce.
- Farrouj meshwi is grilled chicken, served with garlic sauce.
- Jwenih (or Jawaneh) are chicken wings cooked with coriander, garlic and lemon, served as mezze.
- Riz bi-djaj is a dish of chicken and rice.
- Shish taouk is grilled chicken skewers that utilize only white meat, marinated in olive oil, lemon, parsley, and sumac, served on a bed of rice with almonds and pine nuts.

==== Beef ====
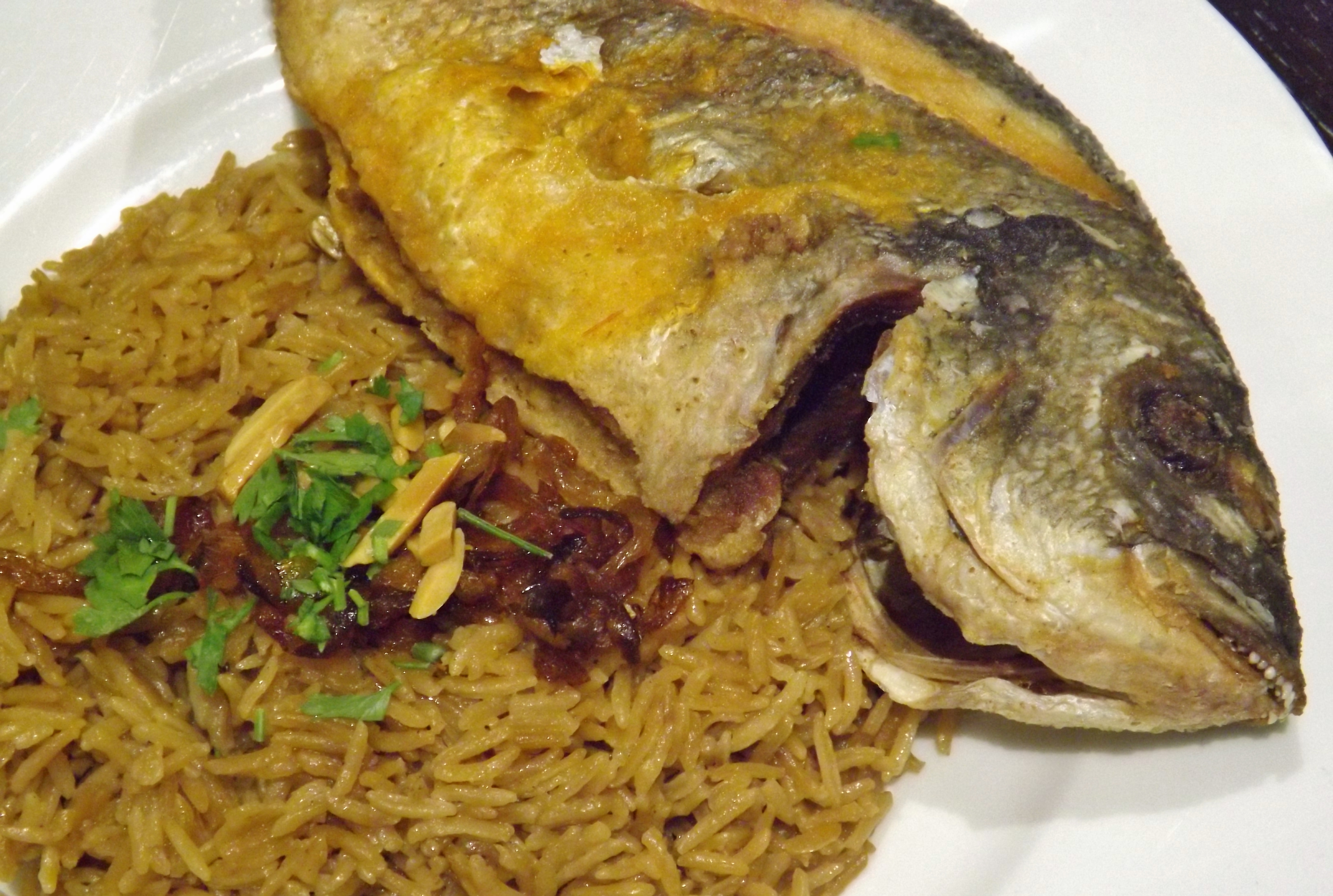
Sayadieh

- Pastirma is cured, seasoned dried beef, introduced by the Ottomans.
- Tabbouleh bi dehn is another version of tabbouleh and is cooked with lentils and beef ghee.
- Ghameh is a delicacy of stuffed cow intestines.
- Kafta bithine is spiced meat with sesame concentrate, popular in Beit ed-Dine.
- Kafta nayyeh is raw beef tartare.

==== Fish ====
- Samkeh harra is grilled fish that has been marinated with chili, citrus, and cilantro.
- Akhtabout is grilled octopus (usually served with samkeh harra in Beirut).
- Sayadieh, is fish cooked in saffron and served on rice with onions, sumac, and a tahini sauce (the most important part of the dish), originating in Sidon.
- Kibbet samak or fish kibbeh is a popular dish in the coastal areas of Lebanon, but also widely eaten during the Lenten period. It consists of the same recipe as meat kibbeh, but uses white fish instead of red meat.

=== Sweets ===
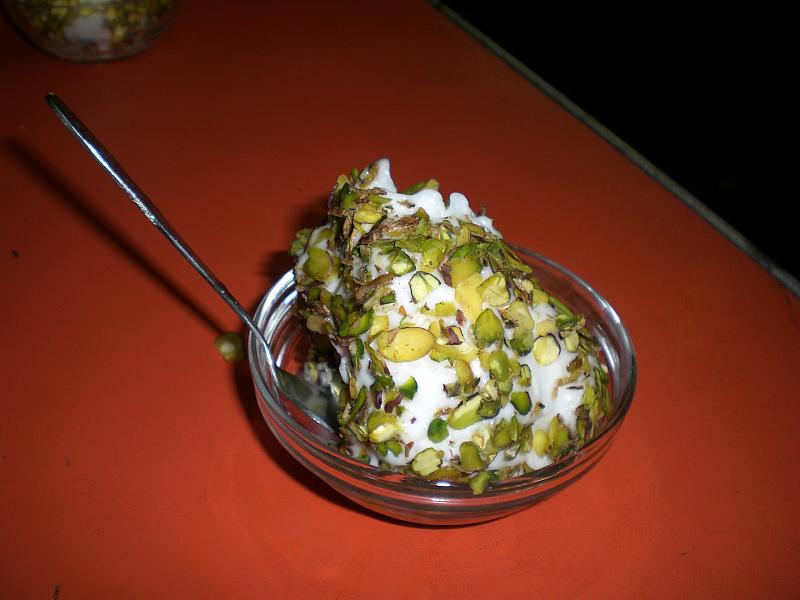
Booza

Lebanese desserts have been influenced by Ottoman cuisine and share many similarities with other neighbouring countries. Semolina is used in the preparation of several prominent Lebanese desserts.

Certain sweets, like kellaj, qatayef, znoud el-sit, and warbat are primarily consumed by Lebanese Muslims during the month of Ramadan.

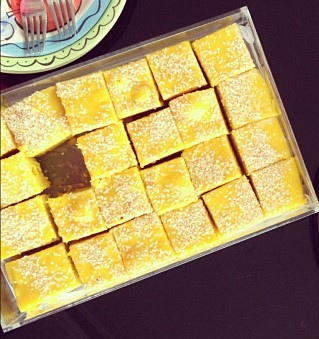
Sfouf is a popular sweet anise-infused cake decorated with almonds

- Muhallebi is a milk pudding made with rice, milk, and sugar. Like many other Lebanese desserts, it is sweetened with attar syrup and served with a garnish of assorted nuts.
- Barazek are cookies with a light and crumbly texture; one side is decorated with sesame seeds and the other side with pistachios.
- Ma'amoul are crumbly cookies filled with pistachios, walnuts or dates. Lebanese Christians serve ma'amoul with atar syrup for Easter, as well as a cake flavored with anise and mahlab.
- Halawet el jibn is filled with sweetened cheese and topped with atar, pistachios, clotted cream (ashta), and rose jam.
- Baklawa is made of a layered pastry filled with nuts and steeped in attar syrup (orange or rose water and sugar), usually cut into a triangular or diamond shape when served, which is the particular style that originated in Lebanon.
- Znoud el-sit is a syrup-soaked rolled pastry filled with clotted cream and garnished in typical fashion with nuts and orange peels, and dates to the 19th century.
- Kanafeh is a dessert stuffed with white cheese (such as akkawi cheese), nuts and syrup, made from kadayif dough.
- Karabij Halab (or Aleppo cookies), is flavored with mahlab and cinnamon, topped with natef, which is similar to meringue.
- Mafroukeh is a semolina dough layered with caramel and butter, soaked in atar and served with clotted cream and assorted nuts. It can also be used to make cakes like nammoura.
- Daoukieh (Arabic: داعوقية, named after its inventor) is a semolina and pistachio dessert from Beirut served with ashta. It is similar to mafroukeh.
- Sfouf is a cake made with semolina flour and turmeric. It is consumed on birthdays, family reunions, and religious holidays.
- Booza is a type of ice cream commonly referred to as "Arabic ice cream", and is filled with Middle Eastern aromas. It is traditionally made through a process of pounding and stretching in a freezer drum, instead of the more usual churning method used in other ice creams. Lebanese ice cream is popular with its eastern flavors, including amar al-din made from dried apricot paste.

=== Condiments and spices ===
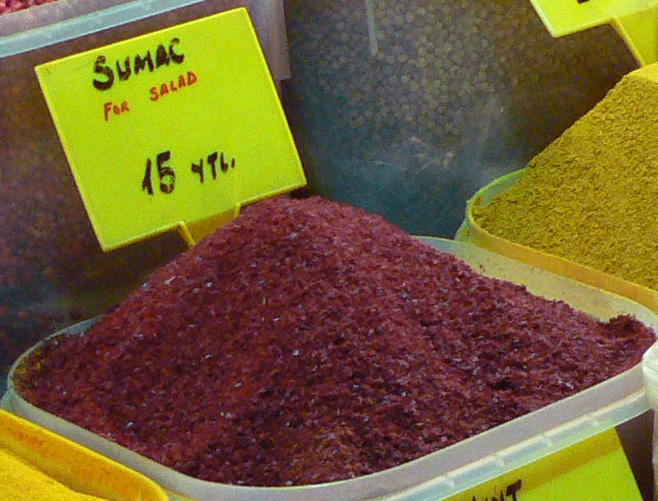
Sumac is a spice used in many salads, hummus and other dishes to provide a tangy, lemony taste

- Tahini – sesame paste.
- Tarator – tahini, water, garlic and lemon dip.
- Toum – garlic sauce.
- Shatta – chili sauce popular in the Middle East.
- Muhammara – a hot pepper dip originally from Aleppo, Syria, found in Levantine and Turkish cuisines.
- Sumac – a tangy spice used in many salads.
- Za'atar – dried thyme and sumac that can differ between regions and households. Most are made at home, but can be bought at Lebanese markets.
- Lebanese spice blend (also called Lebanese seven-spice) – a mixture of equal parts of allspice, black pepper, cinnamon, cloves, fenugreek, nutmeg, and ginger. It is commonly used to flavor many Lebanese dishes.

=== Beverages ===
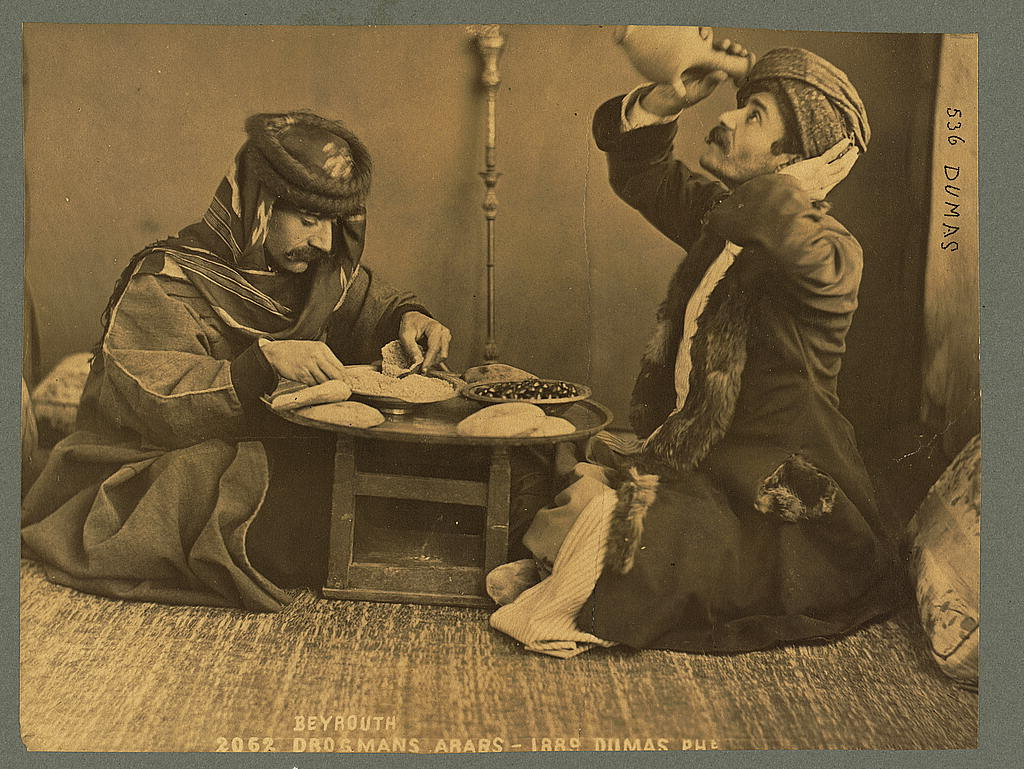
Lebanese Arabs drinking out of a briq and eating a mezze, 1889, Beirut

- Arabic coffee and Turkish coffee.
- Arak – an alcoholic beverage.
- Ayran – yogurt.
- Non-alcoholic beverage made from the carob tree.
- Jallab – sweet drink made from carob, dates, grape molasses, and rose water.
- Lebanese wine – Lebanon is among the oldest sites of wine production in the world. The Phoenicians of its coastal strip were instrumental in spreading wine and viticulture throughout the Mediterranean in ancient times. Lebanon's Beqaa Valley contains more than 30 vineyards, including the renowned Kefraya, Ksara, and Château Musar labels.
- Lebanese beer — Lebanese beer ranges from classic pilsners to innovative craft brews. Most popular brands are Almaza and Beirut Beer.
- Maté – a caffeine-rich infused drink consumed frequently in Shouf and Aley. It was thought to have been brought from Argentina, where its important ingredients are grown by immigrants in the Lebanese diaspora returning home.

== Notable chefs ==
- Tara Khattar

== See also ==
- Arab cuisine
- Levantine cuisine
- Middle Eastern cuisine
