= Sfouf =

Cake from Lebanon

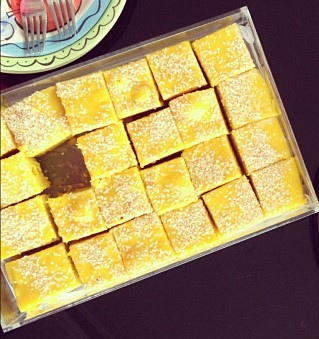
- Type: Cake
- Place of origin: Lebanon
- Main ingredients: Semolina flour, turmeric, sugar, pine nuts

Sfouf (Arabic: صفوف, romanized: ṣufūf, lit. 'rows') is a Lebanese almond-semolina cake consumed on birthdays, family reunions, and religious holidays. It is made from semolina flour flavored with turmeric, sugar, sesame paste, aniseed, and pine nuts, and raised with baking powder. Unlike basbousa, a similar semolina cake, sfouf is not sweetened with qatir.
