= Porron =

Catalonian-origin glass wine pitcher

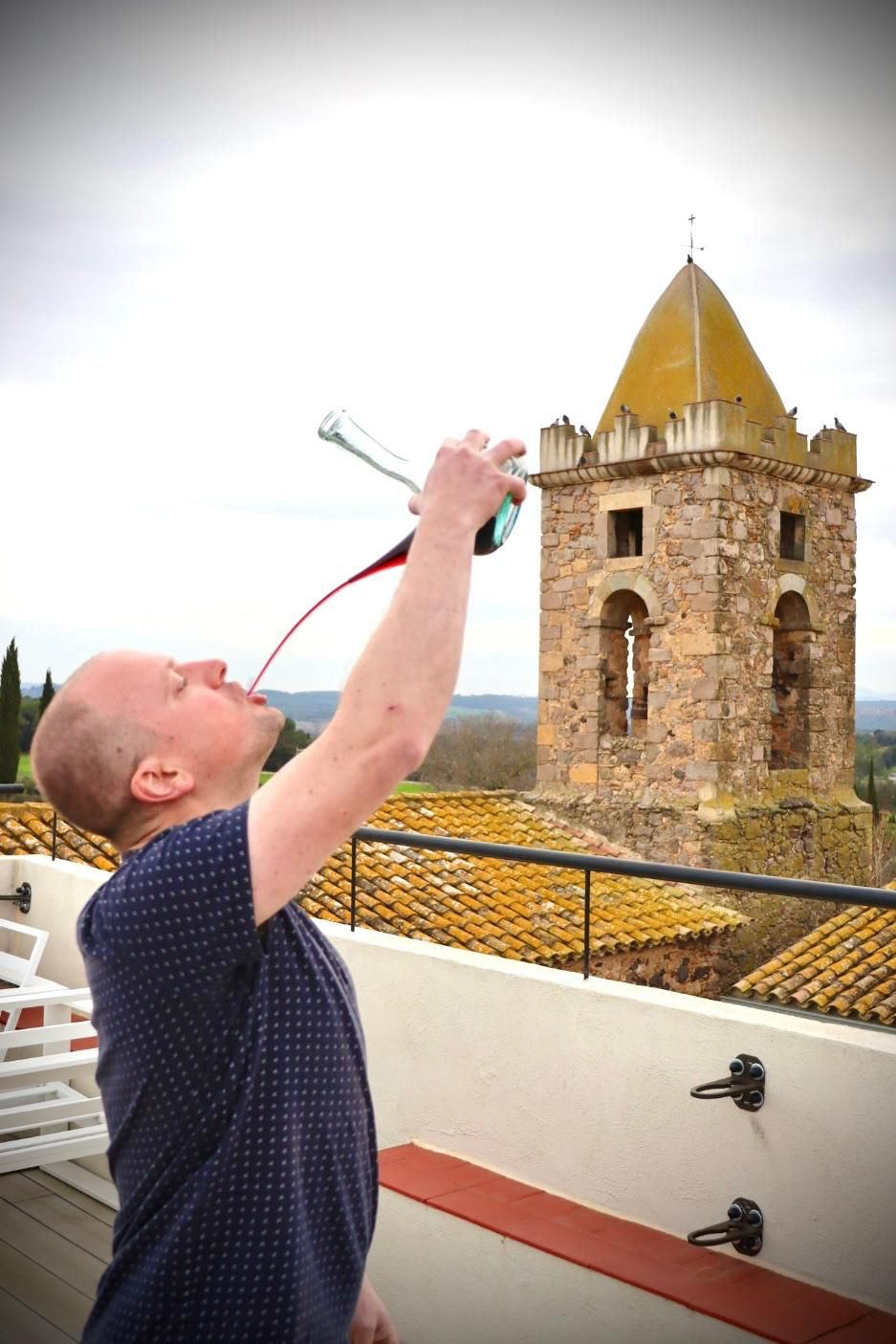
Porrón

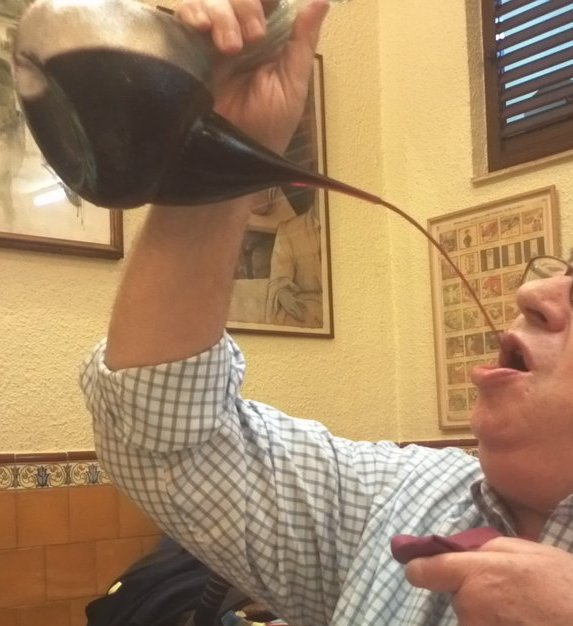
A porrón in use

A porrón (Catalan: porró, Aragonese: purrón, Basque: porroi) is a traditional glass wine pitcher, which holds 750 millilitres (25 US fl oz), typical of Spain, originating in Catalonia, in northeastern Spain, and eventually spreading to other parts of Spain. This invention allows everyone to drink from the same vessel without touching it with their lips. It fosters communal drinking accompanying food, though it does require some skill to ensure the wine enters one's mouth and to keep it from spilling onto clothing. The porron resembles a cross between a wine bottle and a watering can. The top of the bottle is narrow and can be sealed off with a cork. Stemming upwards from the bottom of the pitcher is a spout that gradually tapers off to a small opening. It is shaped such that the wine stored inside it will have minimal contact with the air, while being ready to be used at all times. Until the mid-twentieth century it was very common in homes, but the tradition is now slowly being lost. The idea originated as a replacement to bota bags. Porrons are most commonly filled with regular wines, either white or red, but are also used to drink cava, and a smaller version filled with a sweet, dessert wine (typically Grenache) is also common in Catalan restaurants. The lack of contact with the lips allows a group of people to share the same vessel without offending their sense of hygiene.

== Drinking from a porrón ==
To drink from a porrón, a beginner starts by bringing the spout very close to their mouth and tilts it forward slowly so the beak points towards the teeth. Once the liquid starts coming out, the porró is pulled away from the face while the drinker looks up. To finish drinking, a beginner lowers the porró and brings it back down and closer to the mouth again before stopping, quickly tilting the spout up at the last moment so there is no spillage. A regular user can start and stop drinking from the porró with the spout held at a distance without spilling a drop.

Although drinking from porrons has been largely replaced with bottles and glasses, they are still a feature of Catalan/Spanish-themed restaurants, mainly as a novelty for diners to test their skills.

== The porrón in literature ==
George Orwell described a porrón in Homage to Catalonia:

…and drank out of a dreadful thing called a porron. A porron is a sort of glass bottle with a pointed spout from which a thin jet of wine spurts out whenever you tip it up; you can thus drink from a distance, without touching it with your lips, and it can be passed from hand to hand. I went on strike and demanded a drinking-cup as soon as I saw a porron in use. To my eye the things were altogether too like bed-bottles, especially when they were filled with white wine.

== See also ==
- Botijo
- Briq
- Bota bag
- Wine accessory
- Wine tasting
