= Balila (dish) =

Levantine dish

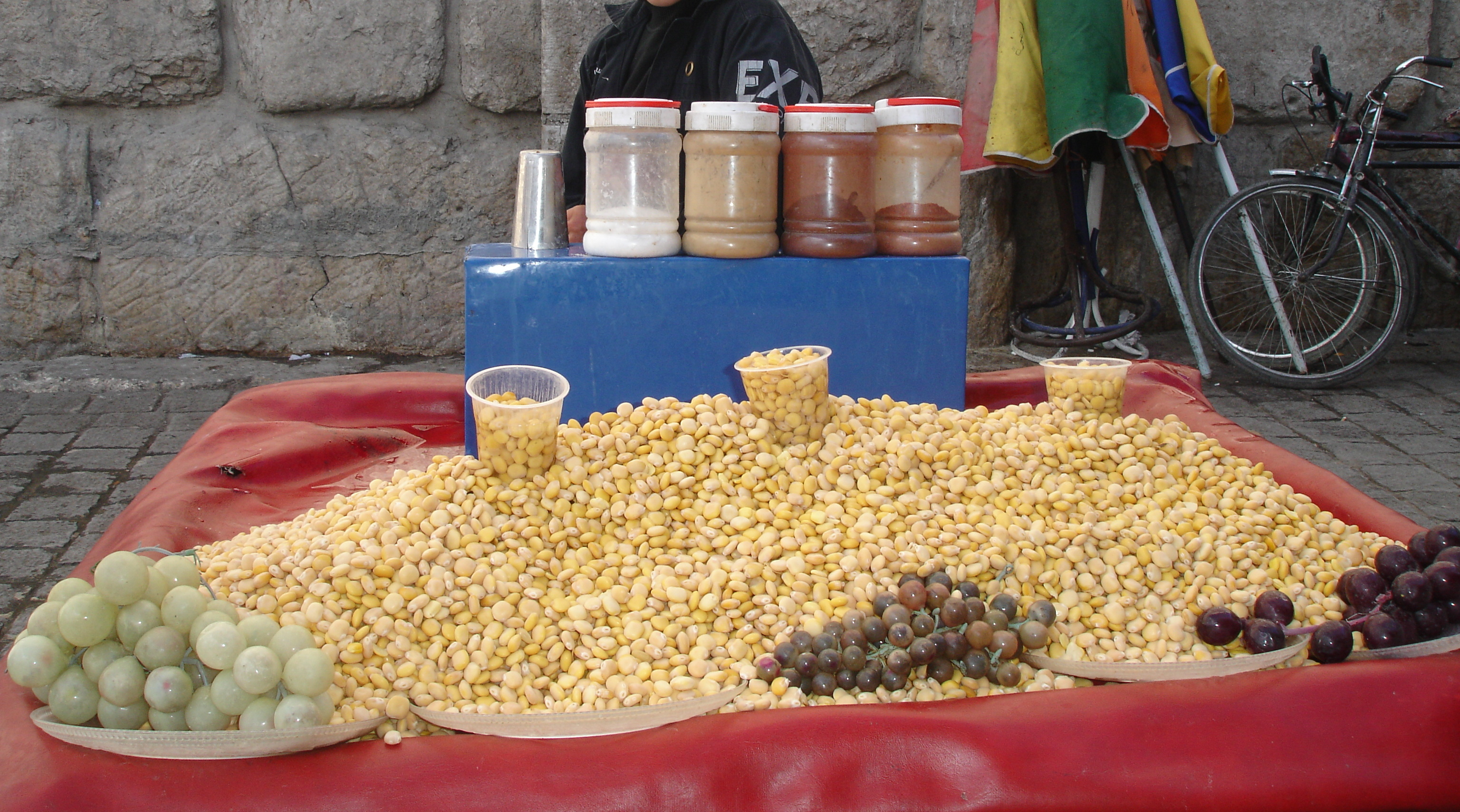
- Balila seller in Damascus, 2013
- Type: Mezze dish
- Place of origin: Hejaz, Saudi Arabia
- Associated cuisine: Hejazi cuisine
- Serving temperature: Hot
- Main ingredients: Chickpeas
- Ingredients generally used: Lemon juice, garlic, and various spices

Balila Egyptian
- Place of origin: Egypt
- Other information: Egyptian version of Balila

Balila is a Hejazi dish consisting of chickpeas that have been boiled along with lemon juice, garlic, and various spices. It is served as a hot mezze dish. The name is also used for a different Egyptian dish made of whole wheat berries, milk, nuts, and raisins.
