= Briq =

Ancient teapot and pitcher traditionally used by the inhabitants of Lebanon and Syria

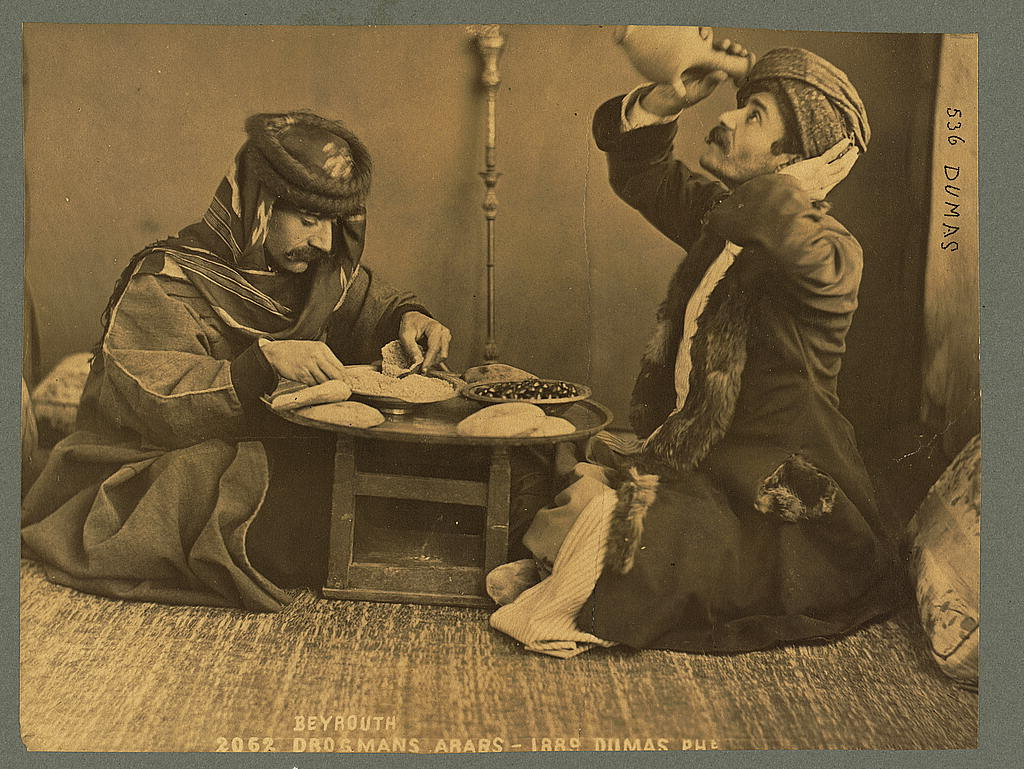
Lebanese Arabs drinking out of a briq and eating a mezze, 1889

A briq, ibrik or brik (Arabic: بريق) is an ancient teapot and pitcher traditionally used by the inhabitants of Lebanon and Syria to prepare and drink tea or water. It is a pot and handle with an unconventional spout that allows liquid to be consumed easily with no receptacle and tea to be mixed effectively and conveniently. It is traditionally earthenware, however glass briqs are also common. It is similar to the Spanish porrón.

== Use ==
The briq was historically carried around by people to quench thirst as its design is efficient and easy to use. Sharing and drinking tea with acquaintances and guests is common practice within Lebanese and Syrian culture and it would not be uncommon to share a tea in a briq with potential business customers as a gesture of good will. The lips do not touch the spout whilst drinking and this is especially important and hygienic as it is usually shared between several people.

== History ==
As there is recordings of briqs being used in Lebanon between 1050 and 850 BC, we know briqs were around at the time of the Phoenician civilization. Some briqs (albeit without the handle) have been found dating from the Early Bronze Age (3500-2200 BC). It is not well known whether these briqs were used for drinking water as they are used today.

Drinking from the briq continues to be practised in many of the rural villages in Lebanon, such as in the Druze village of Sawfar, and many Lebanese people today keep a briq as a cultural artifact, displaying it on a shelf or using it as a flower vase. Their overall use has declined over time into the modern day, however recent efforts have been made to revitalize this ancient cultural heritage in Lebanon.
