= Mfarakeh =

Arab mezze dish

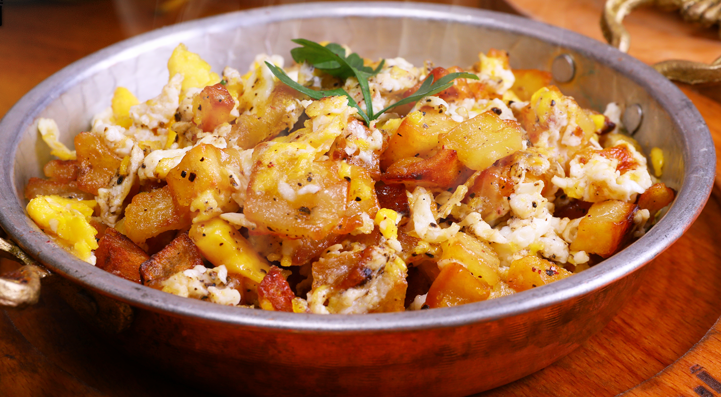
- Mfarakeh
- Alternative names: Mofarakah, mufaraqah, batata wa bayd
- Type: Breakfast
- Place of origin: Levant
- Region or state: Arab world
- Serving temperature: Hot
- Main ingredients: potato, egg, ghee

Mfarakeh (Arabic: مفركة, also spelled mofarakah or mufaraqah also known as batata wa bayd (Arabic: بطاطا وبيض, lit. 'potatoes and eggs') is an Arab dish made of potato, egg, ghee, cumin powder, salt and pepper, in addition chopped coriander leaf for garnish. This dish is very simple to make for breakfast, lunch or dinner. It is eaten with Arabic bread (Pita) and Arabic tea.

Mfarakeh is traditionally served as part of a mezze in the Arab world, especially in the Levant (Lebanon, Syria, Palestine, Jordan).

== Etymology ==
The word "mfarakeh" (Arabic: مفركة) is derived from the Arabic verb, Arabic: فرك, romanized: farak, meaning "the rubbed". The root is also used to describe the crumbling apart of fully ripe wheat when rubbed in one's hand or even a wooden whisk used to break up food. This renders the meaning closer to "that which is crumbled or broken apart into bits"; descriptive of the way the egg falls in crumbles around the potatoes.

Another name for it is mfaraket baid o batata, meaning "rubbed eggs and potatoes".

== History ==
Two recipes for mufarraka were described in a cookbook by 13th-century Abbasid author Muhammad bin Hasan al-Baghdadi. One recipe called for frying eggs and fish in sesame oil, while the other called for chicken liver in place of fish.

Proceedings from 1889-1891 by the International Congress of Orientalists described kūsā mufarrrakah (كوسا مفركة) as a dish of zucchinis that are cooked in water and eaten with finely chopped meat and eggs. The 1885 cookbook Ustadh al-Tabbakhin by Lebanese author Khalil Khattar Sarkis provided 2 recipes for mufarrakat baṣal (مفركة بصل); a dish made by combining cooked onions and sliced boiled eggs.

== Variations ==
The ingredients can be cooked together in a pan like an omelette, or can be cooked separately and made into a salad.

A variety of spices are used, such as sumac, za'atar, or seven-spice.

=== Mfaraket Koosa ===
Mfaraket koosa (Arabic: مفركة كوسا, lit. 'Zucchini mfarakeh') is a similar dish made with zucchini or courgette, it can be made with eggs, or sometimes meat, or even vegan. It is sometimes made by sautéing the leftover pulp from coring zucchinis used in making stuffed zucchinis.

The name mfaraket koussa also refers to a Syrian and Lebanese zucchini stew.

== See also ==
- Arab cuisine
- Egg and chips
- Eggah
- Batata harra
