= List of Middle Eastern restaurants =

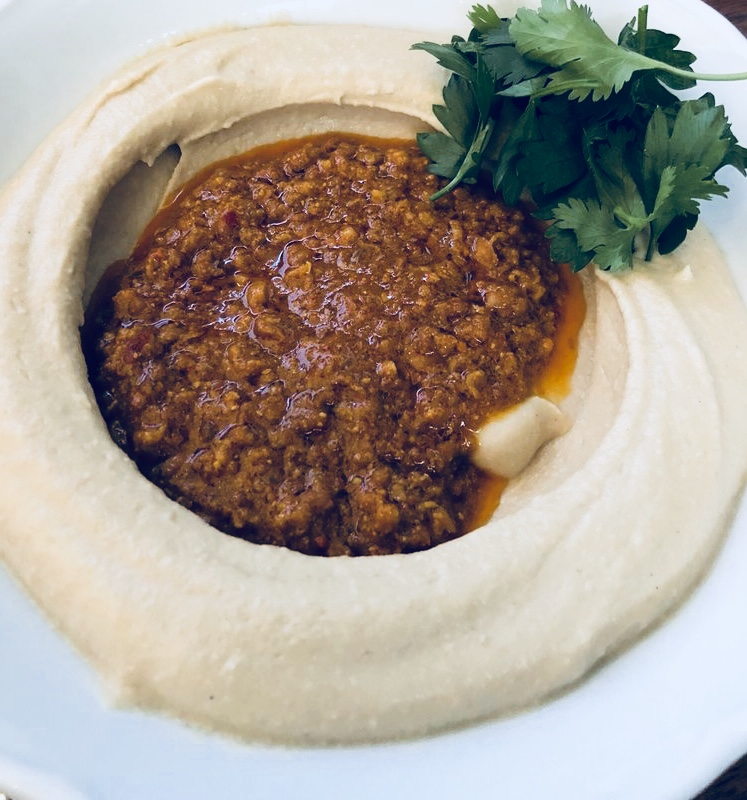
Hummus at Bavel, Los Angeles, California

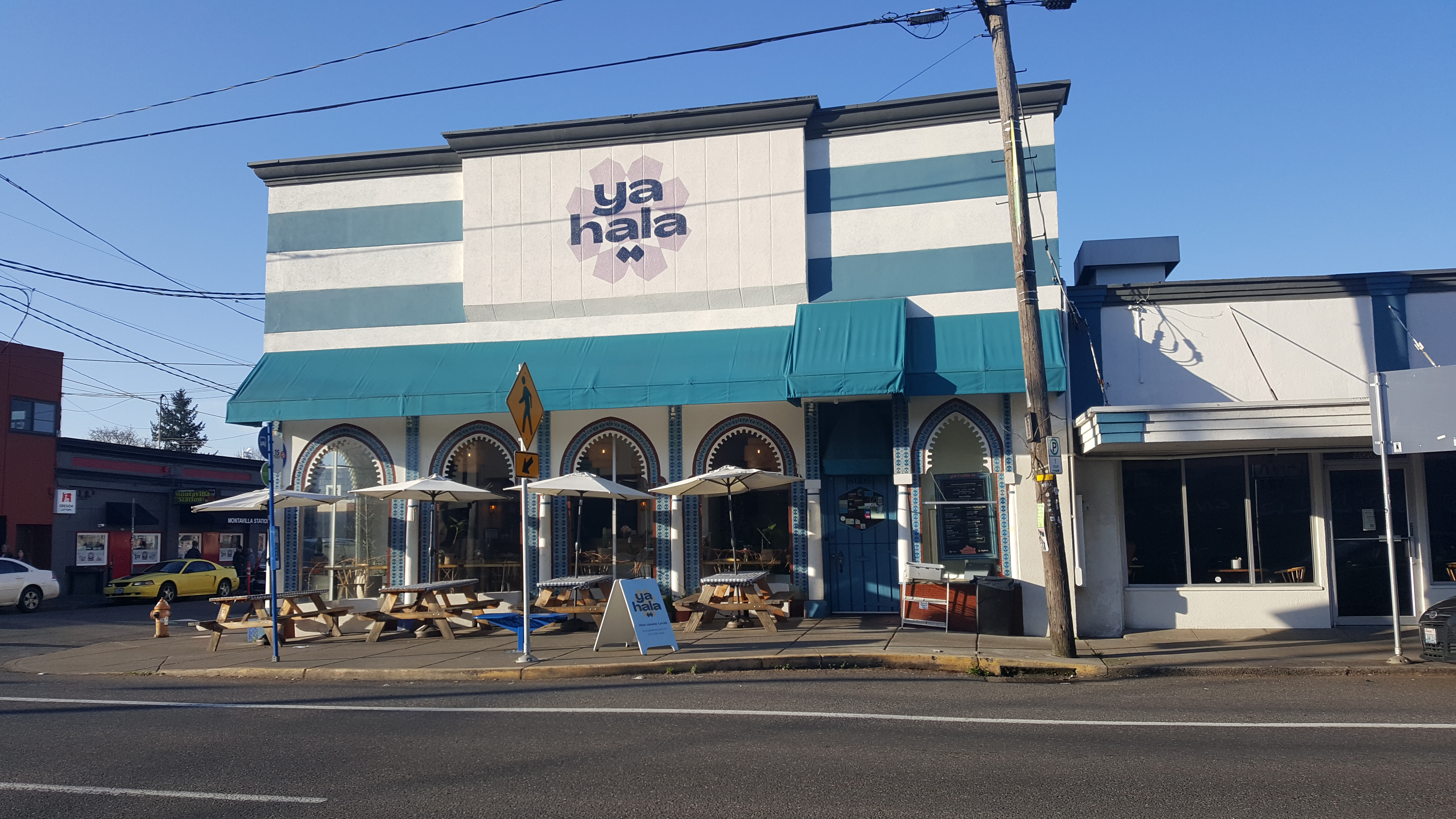
Ya Hala, Portland, Oregon, U.S.

Following is a list of Middle Eastern restaurants:

== Canada ==
- Fat Pasha

== Israel ==
- Abu Hassan – hummus restaurant with 3 locations in Jaffa
- HaShamen – shawarma chain with 7 locations in the Jerusalem and Central districts
- Falafel HaZkenim, Haifa – famous Israeli falafel restaurant. Briefly had a branch.

== United States ==
- Abou Karim
- Ajja
- Ala, Washington, D.C.
- Albi, Washington, D.C.
- Aviv, Portland, Oregon
- Bavel, Los Angeles, California
- Bombay Cricket Club, Portland, Oregon
- Droubi's, Houston, Texas, U.S.
- Galit, Chicago, Illinois
- Habibi Restaurant, Portland, Oregon
- Habib's, Brazilian fast food company
- Hoda's, Portland, Oregon
- Homer, Seattle
- Mamnoon, Seattle
- Mbar, Seattle
- Maydan, Washington, D.C.
- Mutra
- Oleana, Cambridge, Massachusetts
- Queen Mama's Kitchen
- Ravagh Persian Grill
- Shalom Y'all, Portland, Oregon
- Shmoné, New York City
- Tusk, Portland, Oregon
- Ya Hala, Portland, Oregon
- Yellow, Washington, D.C.
