= Yellow (restaurant) =

Restaurant in Washington, D.C., U.S.

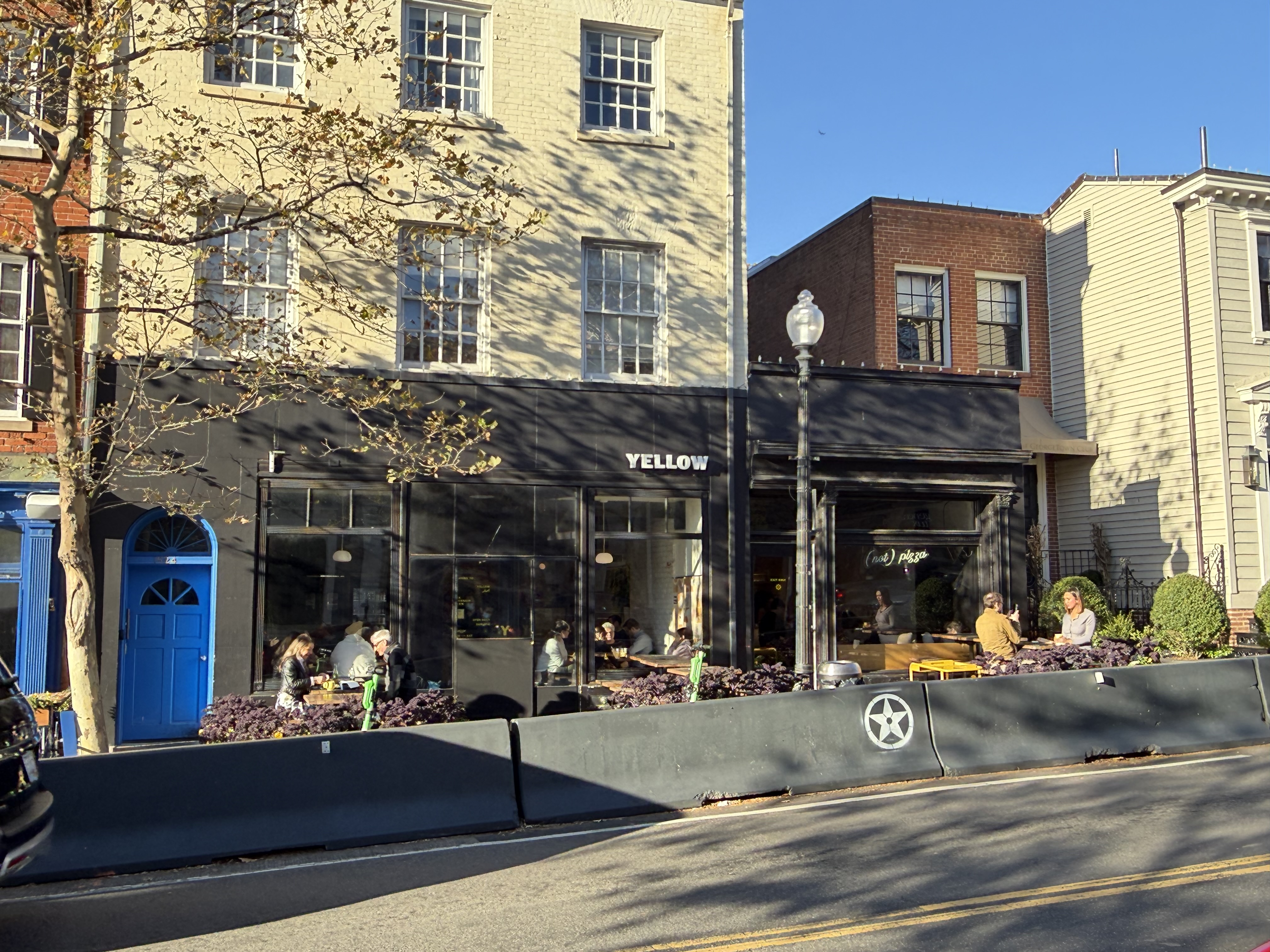
- Exterior of Yellow in 2025
- Interactive map of Yellow

Restaurant information
- Established: 2020
- Owner: Michael Rafidi
- Head chef: Michael Rafidi
- Food type: Levantine; Middle Eastern
- Location: 1524 Wisconsin Avenue NW, Washington, D.C., 20007, United States
- Coordinates: 38°54′34″N 77°03′52″W
- Website: yellowthecafe.com

Yellow is a Levantine / Middle Eastern café in Washington, D.C., United States from chef Michael Rafidi. It was included in The New York Times's 2024 list of the 22 best pizzerias in the U.S.

== See also ==
- List of Middle Eastern restaurants
- List of Michelin Bib Gourmand restaurants in the United States
