= Albi (restaurant) =

Restaurant in Washington, D.C., U.S.

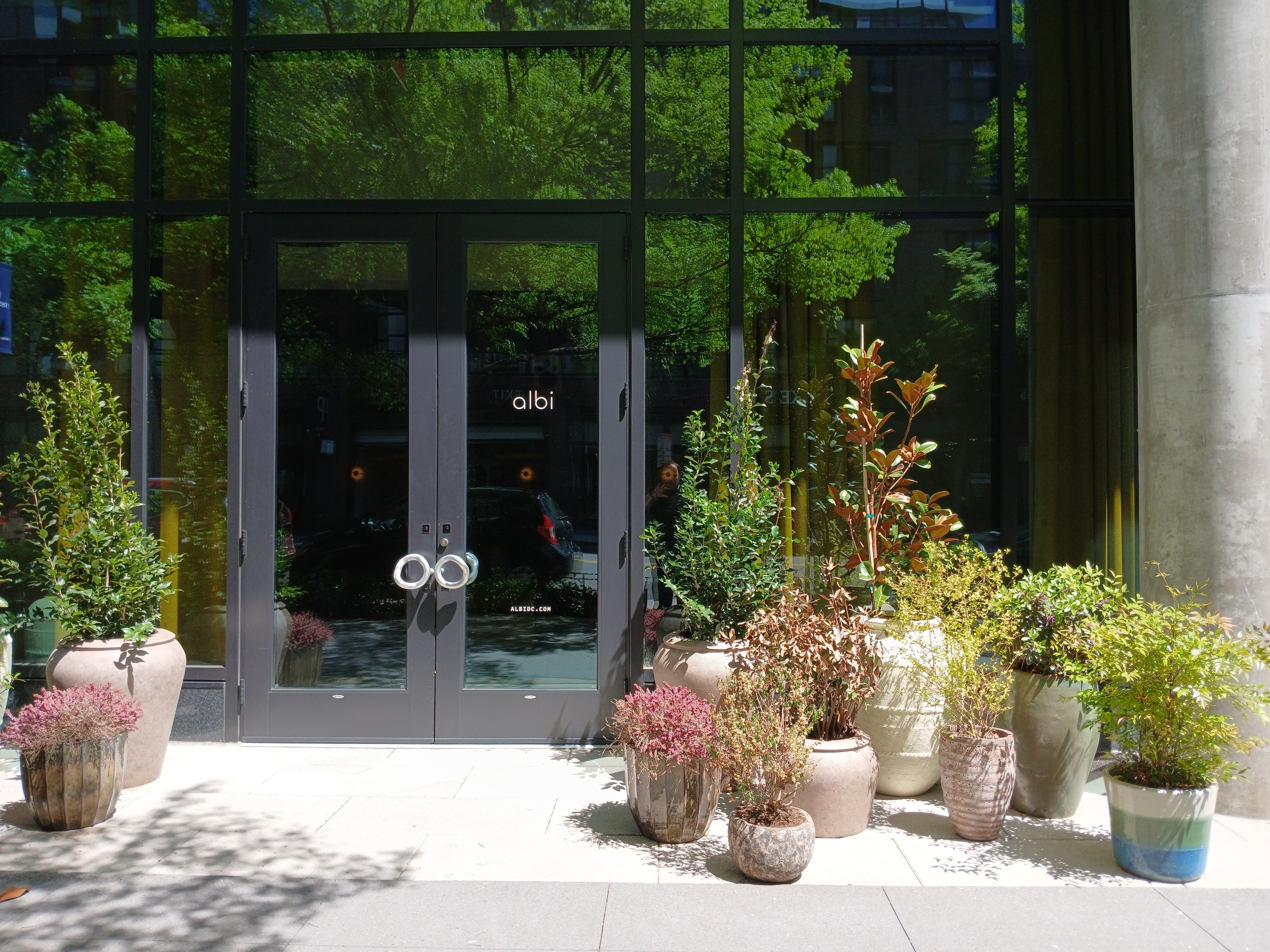
- April 2025
- Interactive map of Albi

Restaurant information
- Established: February 2020
- Owner: Michael Rafidi
- Head chef: Michael Rafidi
- Food type: Middle Eastern
- Rating: (Michelin Guide)
- Location: 1346 4th Street SE, Washington, D.C., 20003, United States
- Coordinates: 38°52′27″N 77°0′1″W
- Reservations: Yes
- Website: albidc.com

Albi is a restaurant in Washington, D.C., United States. It is owned by chef and restauranteur Michael Rafidi. Established in February 2020, the restaurant serves Palestinian cuisine. The menu has included barbecued lamb kebabs and baba ganoush. Albi has received a Michelin star. "Albi" is the Arabic word for "my heart" (Arabic: قلبي).

== See also ==
- List of Palestinian dishes
- List of Michelin-starred restaurants in Washington, D.C.
- List of Middle Eastern restaurants
