= Ala (restaurant) =

Restaurant in Washington, D.C., U.S.

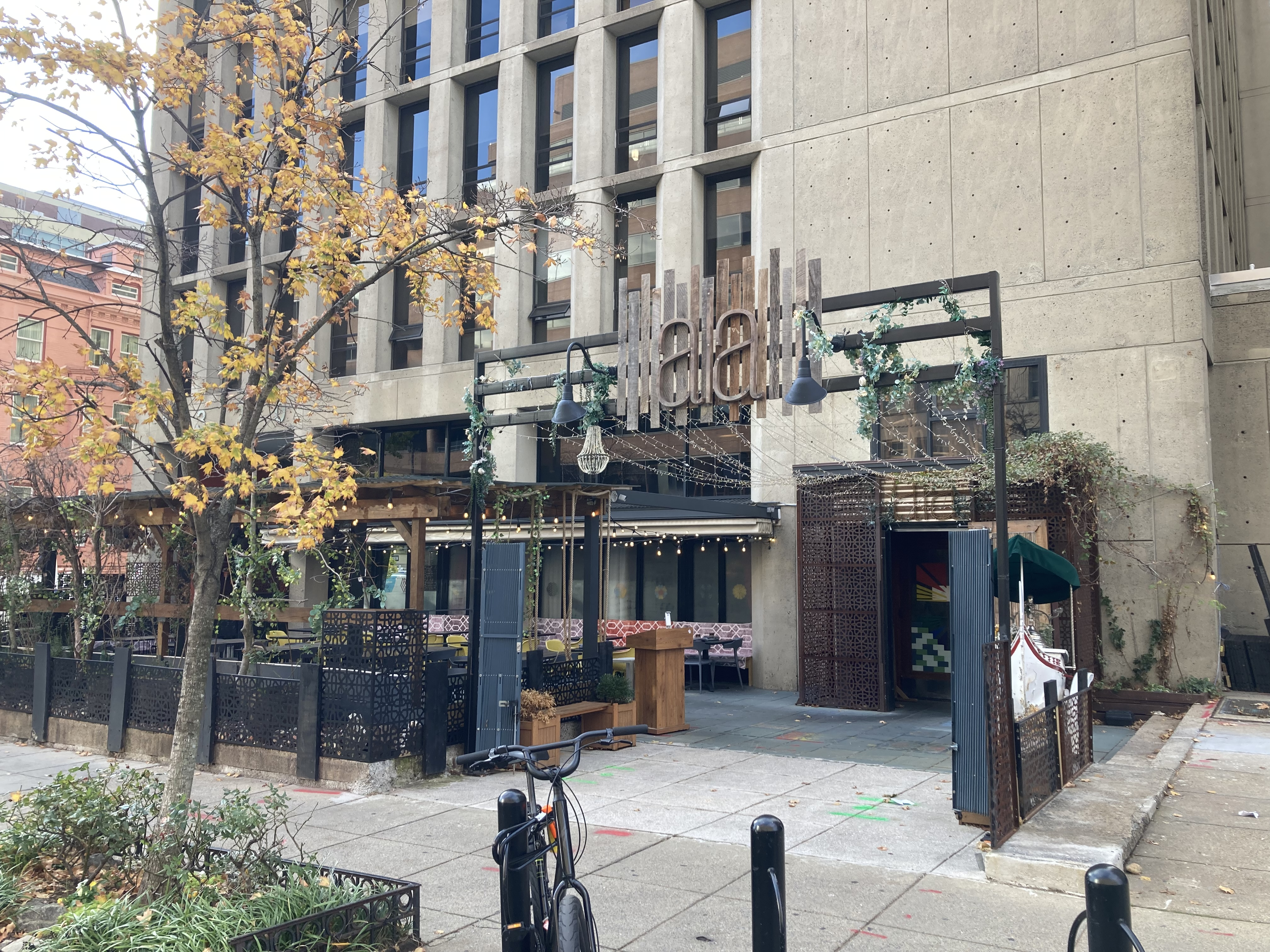
- The restaurant's exterior in 2024
- Interactive map of Ala

Restaurant information
- Food type: Middle Eastern; Mediterranean
- Location: 1320 19th Street NW, Washington, D.C., 20036, United States
- Coordinates: 38°54′29″N 77°2′37″W

Ala is a Middle Eastern and Mediterranean restaurant in Dupont Circle, Washington, D.C.

== See also ==
- List of Middle Eastern restaurants
