= Maydan (restaurant) =

Middle Eastern restaurant in Washington, D.C., U.S.

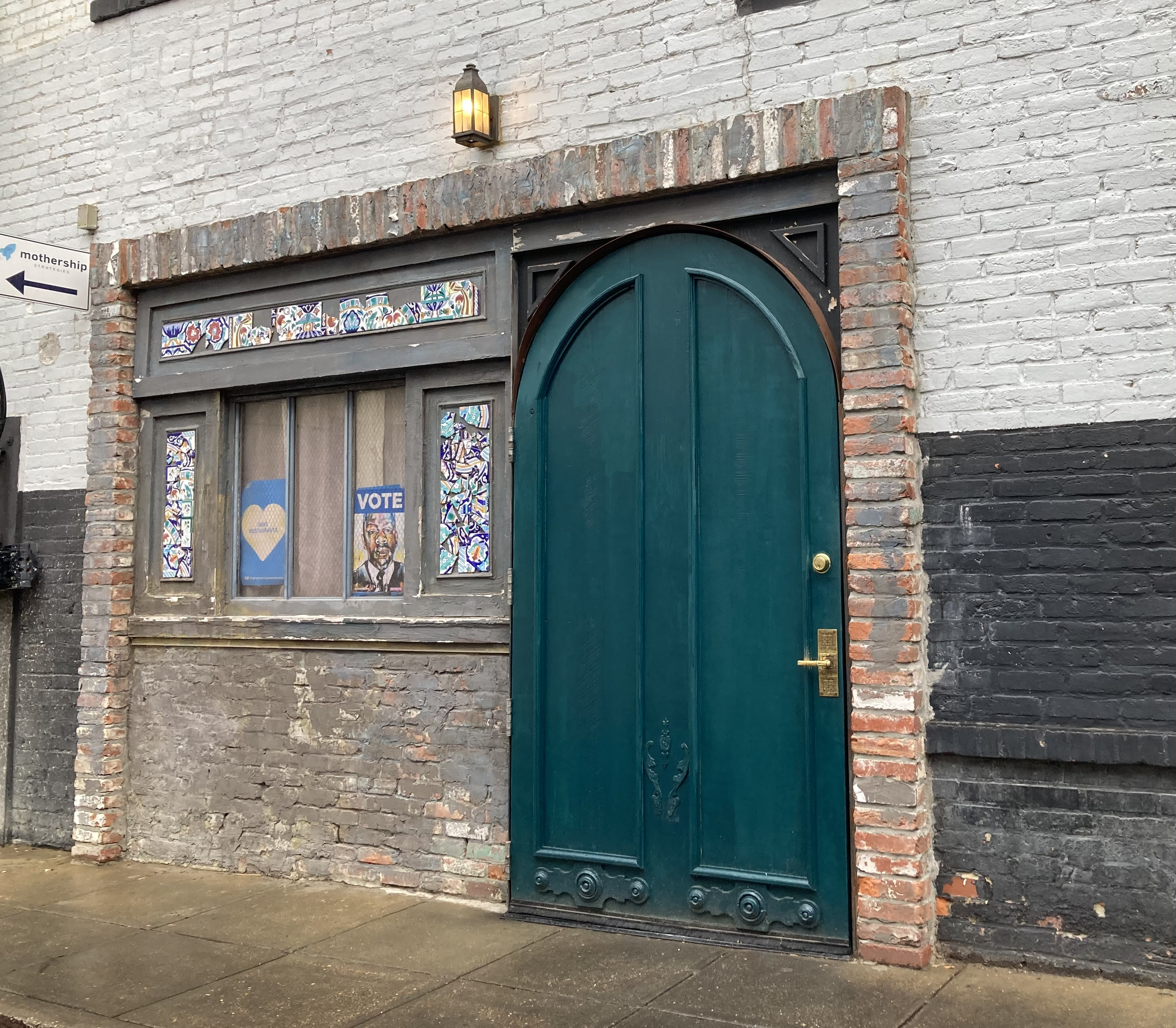
- The restaurant's exterior in 2024
- Interactive map of Maydan

Restaurant information
- Food type: Middle Eastern
- Location: 1346 Florida Avenue NW, Washington, D.C., 20009, United States
- Coordinates: 38°55′12″N 77°1′52″W

Maydan is a Middle Eastern restaurant in Washington, D.C. Gerald Addison and Chris Morgan are chefs.

== Description ==
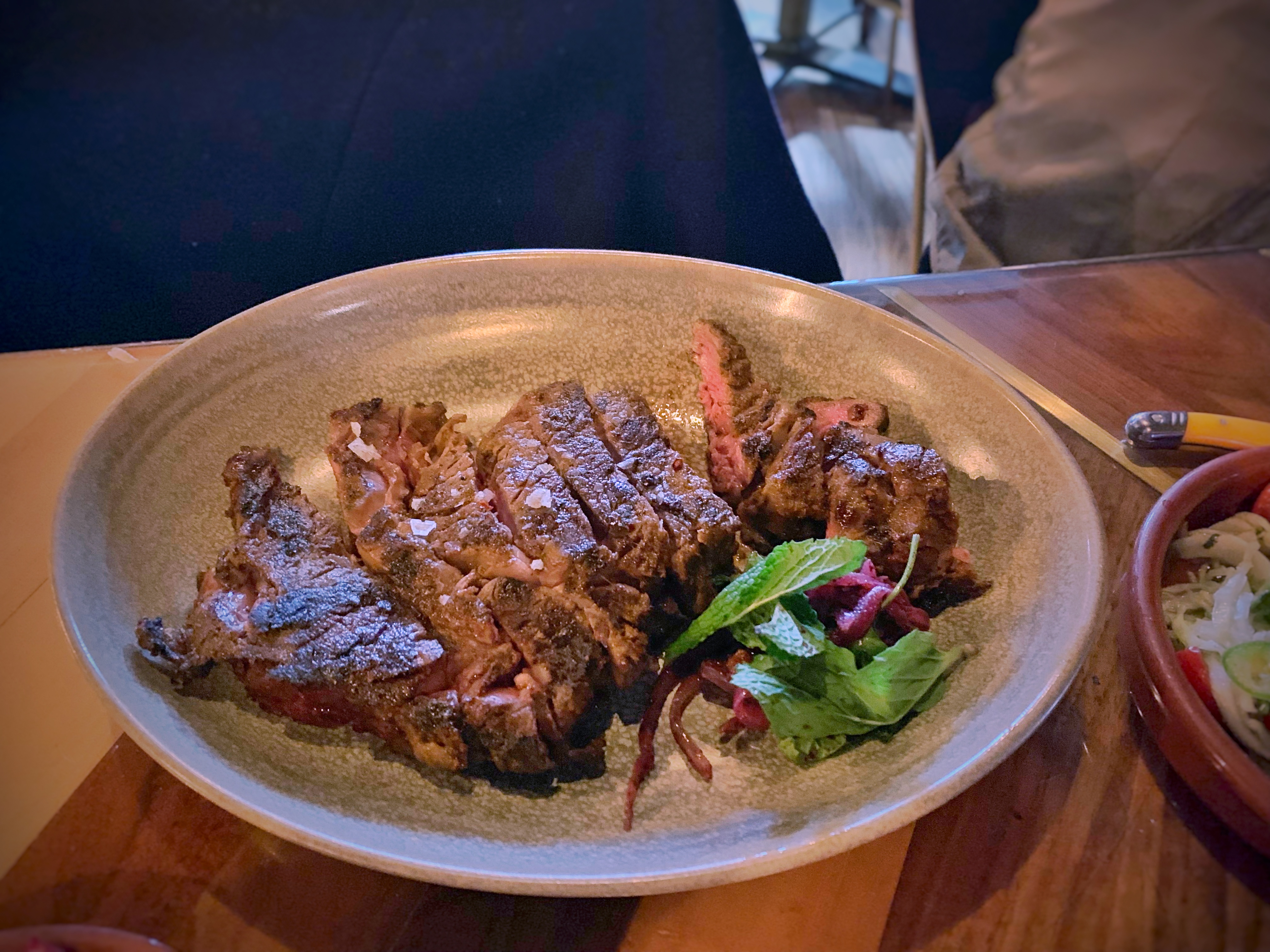
Ribeye with blue fenugreek and adjika

Maydan is a Middle Eastern restaurant in Washington, D.C. The menu has included grilled lamb, breads, and hummus.

== Reception ==
In 2019, Maydan earned a Michelin star.

== See also ==
- List of Michelin-starred restaurants in Washington, D.C.
- List of Middle Eastern restaurants
