= Tusk (restaurant) =

Restaurant in Portland, Oregon, U.S.

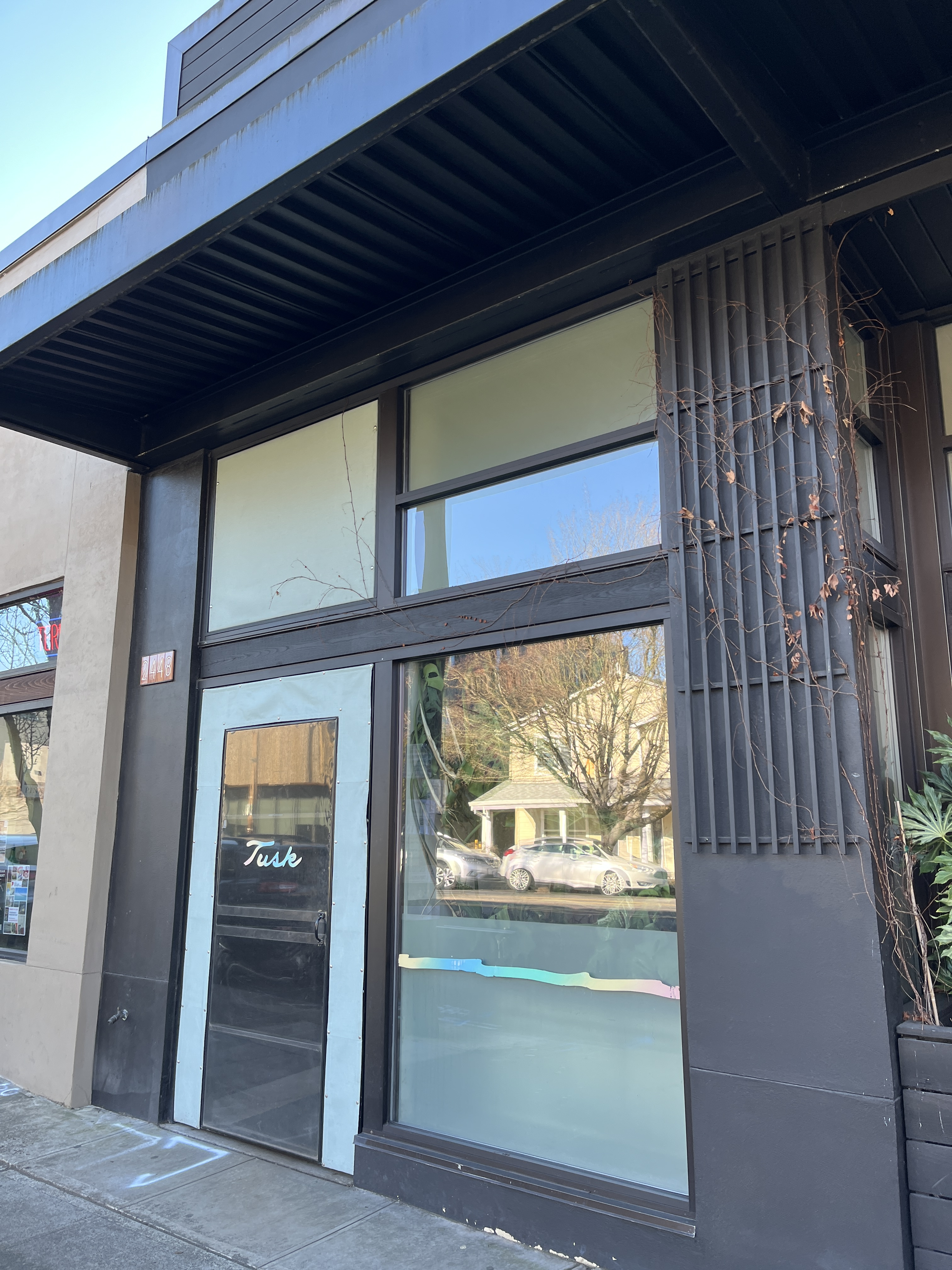
- The restaurant's exterior, 2025
- Interactive map of Tusk

Restaurant information
- Established: 2016
- Food type: Mediterranean; Middle Eastern
- Location: 2448 East Burnside Street, Portland, Oregon, United States
- Coordinates: 45°31′21″N 122°38′26″W
- Website: www.tuskpdx.com

Tusk is a restaurant serving Mediterranean and Middle Eastern cuisine in Portland, Oregon's Buckman neighborhood, in the United States. The restaurant opened in 2016.

== See also ==
- List of Middle Eastern restaurants
