= Aviv (restaurant) =

Defunct Middle Eastern restaurant in Portland, Oregon, U.S.

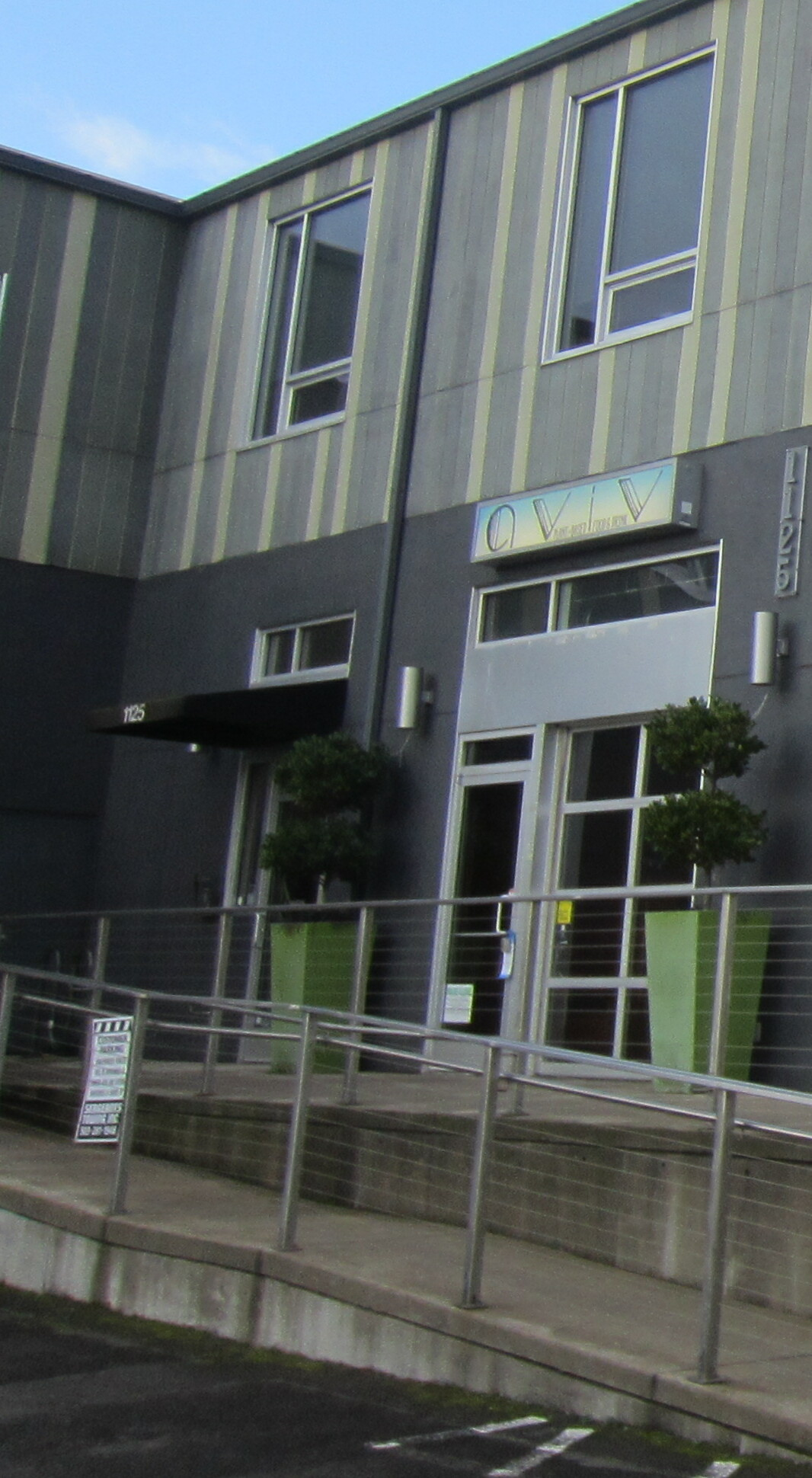
- Exterior of Aviv in southeast Portland's Hosford-Abernethy neighborhood in 2021

Restaurant information
- Closed: 2021
- Owners: Tal Caspi; Sanjay Chandrasekaran; Suzanne Prinsen
- Head chef: Tal Caspi
- Food type: Middle Eastern; vegan
- Location: Portland, Multnomah, Oregon, United States
- Website: avivpdx.com

Aviv (sometimes Aviv PDX) was a Middle Eastern vegan restaurant with several locations in Portland, Oregon. Guy Fieri visited the restaurant for a 2020 episode of the Food Network's Diners, Drive-Ins and Dives. Although Aviv had been popular, it closed in 2021 during the COVID-19 pandemic.

== Description ==
Aviv was a Portland, Oregon-based Middle Eastern and vegan restaurant named after the city Tel Aviv. In 2018, Aviv was Portland's only "vegan Israeli" restaurant. Its plant-based menu included baba ghanoush, falafel, "Gonzo" shawarma fries, eight varieties of hummus, labneh, shakshuka, tahini, spiced Moroccan-style carrots with harissa and tofu feta. The restaurant also served mushroom "calamari", mushroom couscous, and jackfruit brisket. Shakshuka was a 2020 weekend brunch option.

== History ==
After its success as a pop-up restaurant, Aviv was established by owners Tal Caspi and Suzanne Prinsen in partnership with Sanjay Chandrasekaran. The original brick-and-mortar restaurant opened on Southeast Division in May 2017, in a space previously occupied by Chandrasekaran's Heart Bar in southeast Portland's Hosford-Abernethy neighborhood. In early 2020, Guy Fieri visited Aviv for an episode of the Food Network's Diners, Drive-Ins and Dives (season 31, episode 11: "Hometown Inspiration").

=== COVID-19 pandemic and closure ===
During the COVID-19 pandemic, Aviv offered take-out and delivery at times. The restaurant also carried Be Sweet ice cream from Tal Caspi's shop, which closed during the pandemic. For Hanukkah in 2020, Aviv's special menu included matzah ball soup, jackfruit brisket on matzo, grilled-cheese latkes, and challah.

The restaurant was one of several vandalized with "Free Palestine" graffiti in January 2021. By May 2021, Aviv had moved out of its Southeast Division space and was operating in northwest Portland's Pearl District and on Killingsworth Street in northeast Portland's Vernon neighborhood. Another location, Tiny Aviv, opened in August on Madison Street in southeast Portland's Buckman neighborhood.

On September 23, 2021, Eater Portland confirmed plans for all Aviv's locations to close; the restaurants on Killingsworth and Madison closed immediately, and the Pearl District location operated through the end of the month. The restaurant's owners said on social media,

The pandemic hit us hard, and like every single restaurant across the world, we have come up against our share of struggles and setbacks. It's been a challenging year and a half to say the least. Unfortunately, we have made the hard decision to close all Aviv locations this month. We really hoped this day would not come, but it is time.

The Pearl District restaurant became the fourth location of The Sudra, a chain of "Indian and fusion vegan" restaurants.

== Reception ==
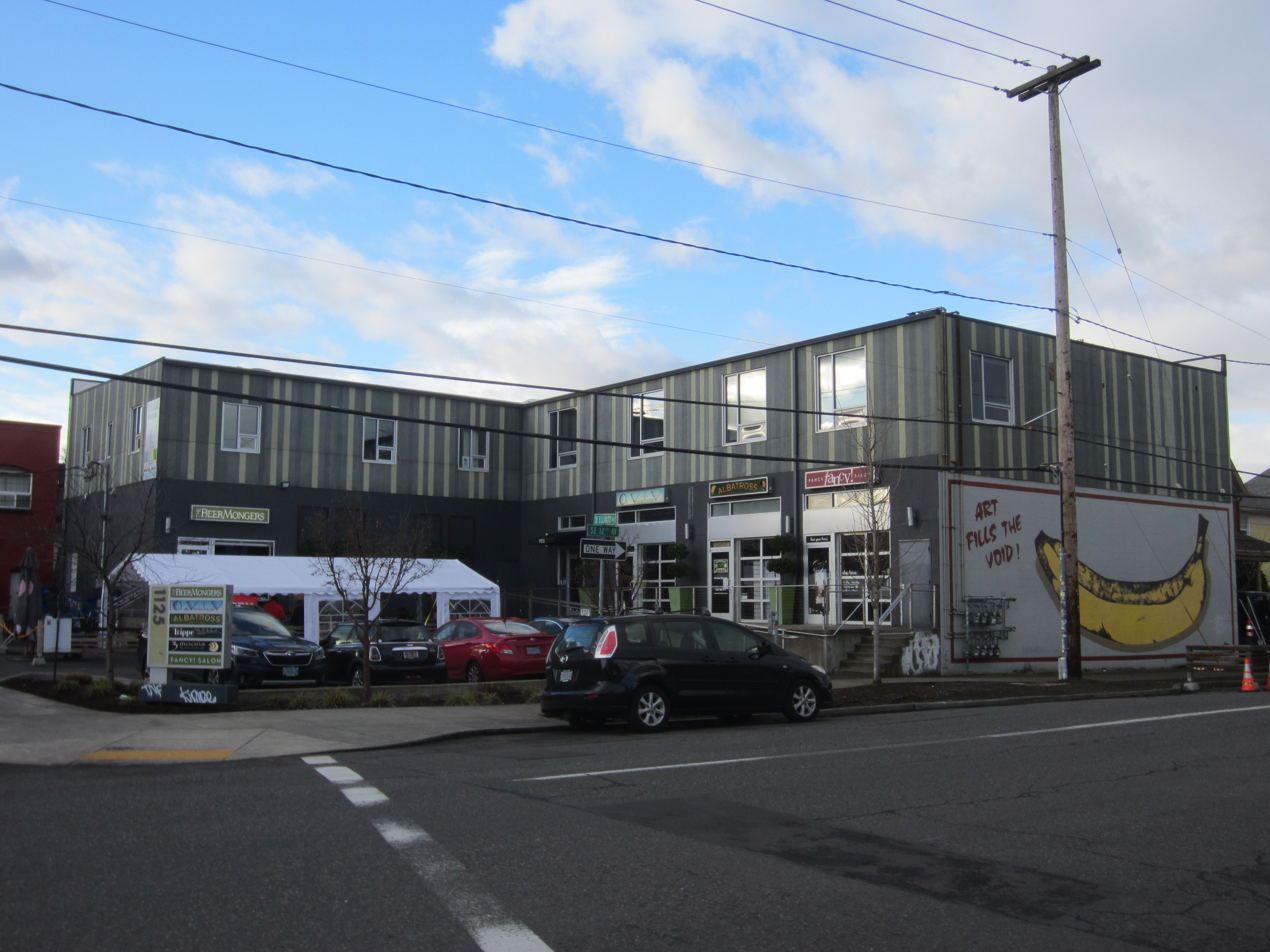
The complex which housed Aviv in southeast Portland's Hosford-Abernethy neighborhood, 2021

Michael Russell included Aviv in The Oregonian's list of Portland's fifty "most notable restaurant openings" of 2017 and its 2019 "ultimate guide" to the city's forty best brunches. In 2017, Aviv was nominated in the Vegetarian/Vegan Restaurant of the Year category of Eater Portland's annual Eater Awards. Waz Wu included Aviv on the website's 2021 list of the city's fifteen "essential" vegan and vegetarian restaurants.

Dan Schlegel and Alex Frane included Aviv on Thrillist's 2019 list of Portland's "best vegetarian and vegan-friendly" restaurants. Lauren Carlos and Michelle DeVona included the restaurant in the website's 2020 overview of "where to find next-level hummus in Portland". In 2021, the Portland Mercury and VegOut's Allie Mitchell included Aviv on lists of "Our Favorite Vegan Restaurants in Portland". The restaurant was also included in the Daily Hive's 2021 list of "7 of the best vegan and vegetarian restaurants in Portland".

Martin Cizmar included Aviv on Willamette Week's 2017 list of the best restaurants on Division and Clinton Streets. In 2019, the newspaper recommended the restaurant for "a hangover brunch without the bacon". Willamette Week's Shannon Gormley included Aviv on a 2019 list of the ten "best places" in Portland for hummus, and its shawarma bowl on a 2019 list of five "cheap vegan meals that are actually good". Aviv was a runner-up in the Best Mediterranean Restaurant and Best Vegetarian/Vegan Restaurant categories in the newspaper's 2020 Best of Portland readers' poll.

== See also ==
- Impact of the COVID-19 pandemic on the restaurant industry in the United States
- List of Diners, Drive-Ins and Dives episodes
- List of Middle Eastern restaurants
- List of restaurant chains in the United States
- List of vegetarian and vegan restaurants
