= Ajja (restaurant) =

Restaurant in Raleigh, North Carolina, U.S.

- Interactive map of Ajja

Restaurant information
- Location: 209 Bickett Boulevard, Raleigh, North Carolina, 27608, United States
- Coordinates: 35°48′02″N 78°38′20″W

Ajja is a Mediterranean and Middle Eastern restaurant in Raleigh, North Carolina owned and operated by Cheetie Kumar and Paul Siler.

== Reception ==
In 2023, Ajja was included in Esquire's list of the 50 best new restaurants in the United States.

== See also ==
- List of Middle Eastern restaurants
