= Homer (restaurant) =

Restaurant in Seattle, Washington, U.S.

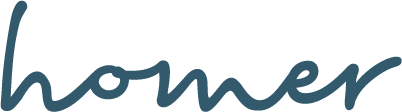
- Interactive map of Homer

Restaurant information
- Owners: Logan Cox and Sara (Knowles) Cox
- Food type: Mediterranean; Middle Eastern
- Location: 3013 Beacon Ave South, Seattle, King, Washington, United States
- Coordinates: 47°34′36″N 122°18′36″W

Restaurant Homer, or simply Homer, is a restaurant in Seattle, in the U.S. state of Washington. Established in 2018, it operates on Beacon Avenue South in the city's Beacon Hill neighborhood. Spouses Logan Cox and Sara (Knowles) Cox are co-owners; the restaurant is named after their golden retriever.

== Description ==
Homer serves Middle Eastern and Mediterranean cuisine. Naomi Tomky of Eater Seattle described the restaurant as "Middle East-meets-Northwest". According to The Infatuation, "Because of the quaint wallpaper and wall molding, Homer looks like it could be the lobby of a luxurious bed and breakfast in The Hamptons." There is outdoor seating on a sidewalk patio. GQ has said the "vegetable-forward" menu includes small plates.

== Reception ==
The Infatuation included Homer in a list of the best new restaurants of 2018. The restaurant was subsequently included in the website's 2019 list of eleven restaurants "that aren't dead during the week". In 2024, The Infatuation included Homer in lists of the city's most romantic eateries for a date night, recommended restaurants with gluten-free options, and best restaurants in Beacon Hill. Homer was the readers' choice winner in the Restaurant of the Year category in Eater Seattle's annual Eater Awards in 2018. In 2019, the business was included in GQ's list of the nation's best new restaurants and was named Restaurant of the Year by Seattle Metropolitan. The latter magazine also included Homer in a 2024 list of Seattle's 50 best restaurants. Emma Banks included the business in Thrillist's 2022 list of the city's eleven most romantic restaurants. Time Out Seattle included Homer in a 2023 list of the city's best restaurants.

== See also ==
- List of Middle Eastern restaurants
