= Mamnoon (restaurant) =

Restaurant in Seattle, Washington, U.S.

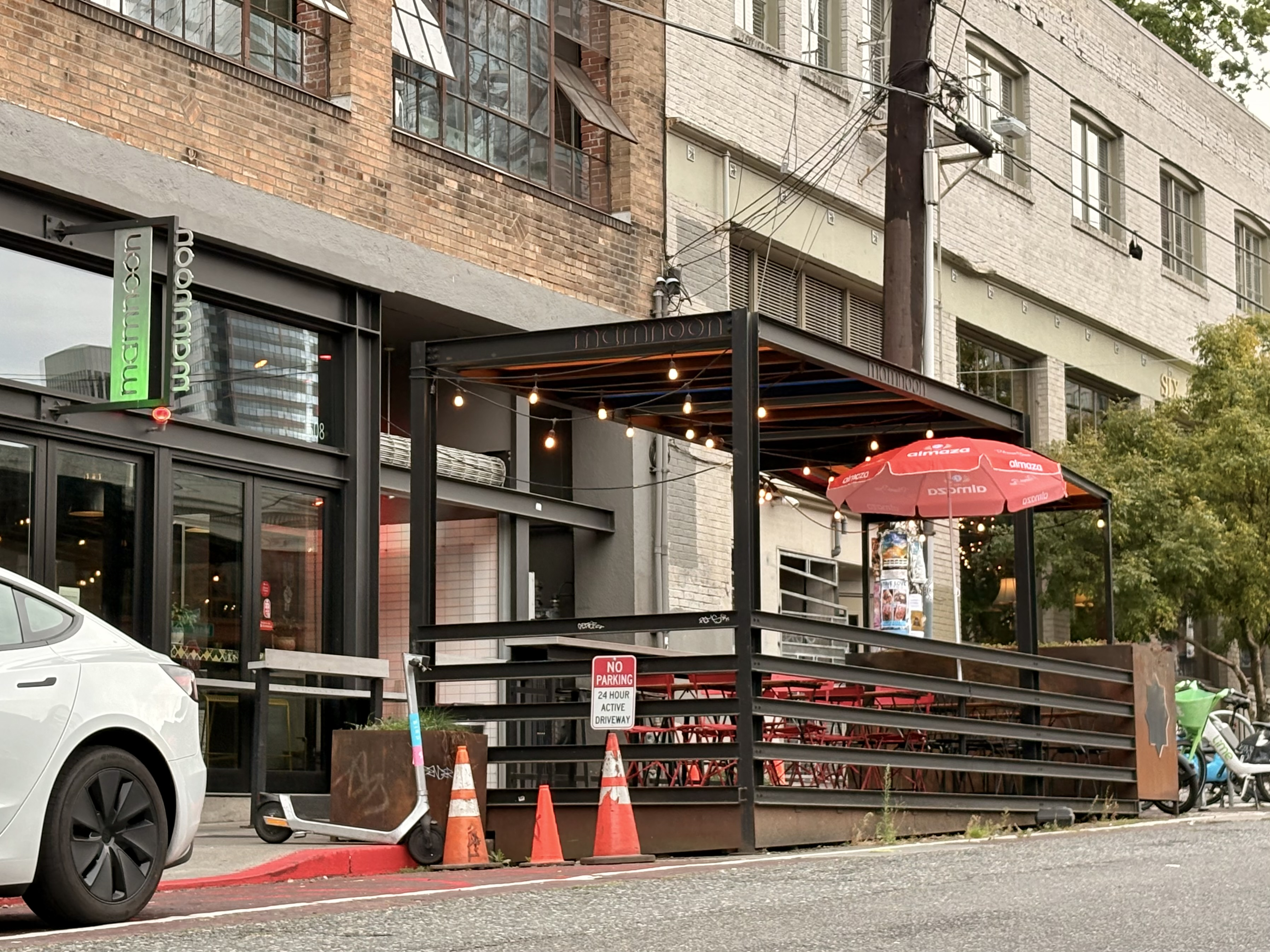
- The Mamnoon restaurant before opening for its final day of operation on September 14, 2025.
- Interactive map of Mamnoon

Restaurant information
- Location: 1508 Melrose Avenue, Seattle, King, Washington, United States
- Coordinates: 47°36′52″N 122°19′40″W
- Other locations: Mamnoon Street, Mbar
- Website: https://nadimama.com/mamnoon

Mamnoon (stylized in lowercase as mamnoon) was a restaurant on Capitol Hill in Seattle, Washington, United States. It opened in 2012 and closed permanently after a final day of service on September 14, 2025.

== Description ==
The restaurant Mamnoon served Levantine (also described as Iranian, Lebanese, Middle Eastern, Persian, and Syrian) cuisine on Seattle's Capitol Hill. It was described as "modern-industrial". The menu included flatbreads, meat kebabs, hummus, pumpkin dumplings, chicory salad with sour mint dressing, and labneh cheesecake.

== History ==
Wassef and Racha Haroun opened the restaurant in November 2012.

The restaurant's new menu covers in 2014 were designed by Tina Randolph. Mamnoon launched brunch service in 2016.

Carrie Mashaney, Garrett Melkonian, and Jason Stratton were chefs. Stratton became executive chef in 2015.

Anar and Mbar, which opened in 2016, have been described as sibling establishments.

In 2025, Mamnoon announced plans to close permanently on September 14.

== Reception ==
Mamnoon was named Restaurant of the Year by Seattle Metropolitan in 2013. Seattle Magazine described the restaurant as "chic and delicious" in 2013.

== See also ==
- List of defunct restaurants of the United States
- List of Lebanese restaurants
- List of Middle Eastern restaurants
