= Mbar (Seattle) =

Restaurant in Seattle, Washington, U.S.

- Interactive map of Mbar

Restaurant information
- Established: 2016
- Food type: Mediterranean; Middle Eastern
- Location: 400 Fairview Ave N., Seattle, King, Washington, United States
- Coordinates: 47°37′22″N 122°20′02″W

Mbar is a bar and restaurant in Seattle, Washington, United States. It is slated to close permanently on November 1, 2025.

== Description ==
The rooftop bar and restaurant Mbar operates in Seattle's 400 Fairview building. The "industrial-chic" space offers views of Lake Union and the Space Needle. Mbar serves Mediterranean and Middle Eastern cuisine, according to The Infatuation. It has been described as a sibling business to the restaurant Mamnoon.

== History ==
The restaurant opened in 2016.

Carrie Mashaney has been culinary director of the Mama restaurant group, which operates Mbar.

Mbar hosted a Pride party in 2023.

In October 2025, the business announced plans to close permanently on November 1, operating for approximately nine years.

== Reception ==
In 2017, Megan Hill of Eater Seattle wrote, "Sky-high Mbar seems to best encapsulate Seattle at this very moment. Perched among the high rises (both existing and in-progress) of South Lake Union, surrounded by glass and steel, you’ll dine on some of the city’s best food right now. Chef Jason Stratton does an impressive job melding diverse influences with dishes that pop with the flavors of Italy, the Middle East, and Spain. The experience is made even more dizzying by the views." The website's Brianna Gunter included Mbar in a 2025 list of Seattle's best rooftop bars and restaurants. Writers for Thrillist have deemed Mbar to have among Seattle's best rooftop bars.

== See also ==
- List of Middle Eastern restaurants
