= Ravagh Persian Grill =

Restaurant information
- Established: 1998
- Food type: Iranian; Middle Eastern
- Location: United States
- Website: ravaghrestaurants.com

Ravagh Persian Grill (Persian: رواق, romanized: ravagh) is a chain of restaurants serving Iranian cuisine in the New York metropolitan area. The name of the restaurant means "portico" in Farsi.

== Locations ==
There are four locations, including two in Manhattan and two on Long Island. Locations had previously existed in Edgewater, New Jersey, and in the East Village. The latter closed in 2020, during the COVID-19 pandemic. The first location opened in 1998 in Midtown Manhattan.

== Reception ==
Emma Diab of Thrillist included Ravagh in her list of the city's best Middle Eastern restaurants in 2017. Eater New York's Alexandra Ilyashov recommended Ravagh in her 2018 list of the city's Middle Eastern restaurants. She, Ilana Dadras, and Urvija Banerji also included Ravagh in a 2020 list of Upper East Side restaurants. Zagat rated the East Village restaurant 4.3 for food, 3.4 for decor, and 3.9 for service, each on a scale of 5, and said, "Among NYC's few options for classic Persian cooking, these Eastsiders dish up flavorful, stick-to-your-ribs fare including succulent kebabs and delicious rice dishes; generous portions and value prices offset the lacking decor.

== See also ==
- List of Middle Eastern restaurants
- List of restaurants in New York City
