= Mutra =

Restaurant in North Miami, Florida, U.S.

- Interactive map of Mutra

Restaurant information
- Food type: Israeli; Middle Eastern
- Location: 2188 NE 123rd St., North Miami, Florida, United States
- Coordinates: 25.8892°N 80.1541°W
- Website: mutramiami.com

Mutra is an Israeli and Middle Eastern restaurant in North Miami, Florida, United States. It has received a Michelin star.

== See also ==
- List of Michelin-starred restaurants in Florida
- List of Middle Eastern restaurants
