= Fat Pasha =

- Interactive map of Fat Pasha

Restaurant information
- Established: April 11, 2014
- Chef: Anthony Rose
- Food type: Israeli; Middle Eastern
- Location: 414 Dupont Street, Toronto, Ontario, Canada
- Coordinates: 43°40′26″N 79°24′42″W
- Seating capacity: 50
- Website: fatpasha.com

Fat Pasha is an Israeli and Middle Eastern restaurant in Toronto, Ontario, Canada. Anthony Rose is the chef. Bon Appétit has said the restaurant serves "hipster Jewish soul food".

== History ==
The restaurant was started by chef-owner Anthony Rose in April 2014. Rose, who owns and operates other restaurants in Toronto, wanted to open a concept based on his Jewish heritage and the "laid-back" dining culture of Israel.

== Concept ==
The restaurant's name, Fat Pasha, comes from a Turkish phrase used to describe a "powerful man".

Fat Pasha's cuisine and dishes are based on Israeli street food and European Jewish food such as schmaltz and gribenes.

== Recognition ==
Writing for The Globe and Mail in 2014, restaurant critic Chris Nuttall-Smith praised Fat Pasha as chef Anthony Rose’s “best effort yet,” highlighting its generous portions, lively atmosphere, and inventive take on modern Israeli cooking, while noting occasional missteps such as overcooked fish and bland pita.

The business was named a Bib Gourmand restaurant by the Michelin Guide at Toronto's inaugural 2022 Michelin Guide ceremony, and retained the designation 2023. It lost the designation in 2024 and has since been removed from the Michelin Guide.

== See also ==
- List of Michelin Bib Gourmand restaurants in Canada
- List of Middle Eastern restaurants
