= Bavel (restaurant) =

Middle Eastern restaurant in Los Angeles

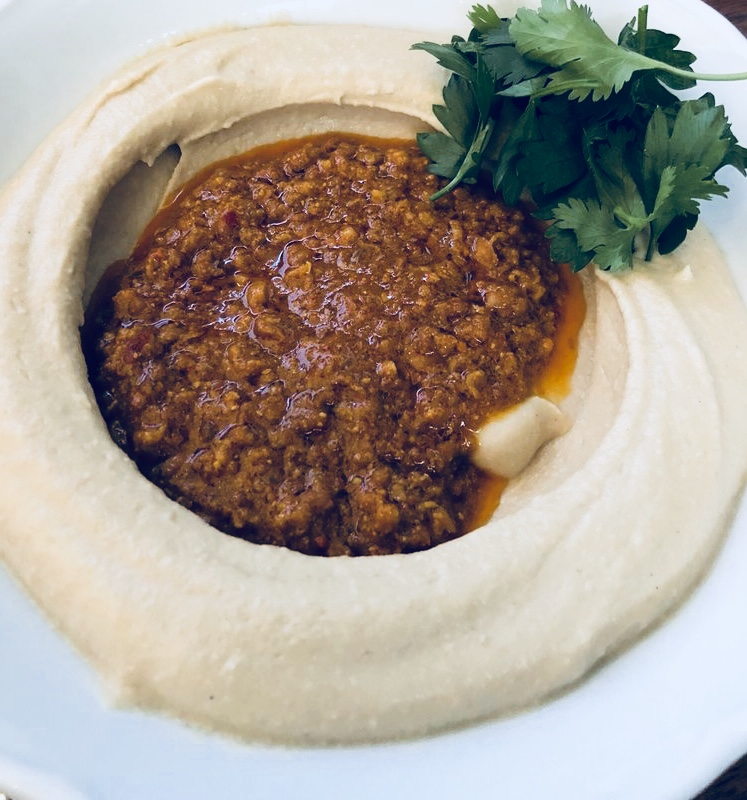
- Bavel׳s hummus with duck nduja
- Interactive map of Bavel

Restaurant information
- Established: 2018
- Owners: Ori Menashe & Genevieve Gergis
- Head chef: Ori Menashe
- Chef: Ori Menashe (chef de cuisine), Genevieve Gergis
- Food type: Middle Eastern
- Location: 500 Matteo St, Arts District, Los Angeles, California, United States
- Coordinates: 34.041487°N 118.232933°W
- Reservations: recommended
- Website: baveldtla.com

Bavel is a Middle Eastern restaurant in the Arts District neighborhood of Los Angeles. The restaurant defines itself as Middle Eastern, showcasing the cuisines of Israel, Morocco, Turkey, and Egypt, though some critics characterize it as Israeli. It received positive reviews from Jonathan Gold and Bon Appétit, and the Los Angeles Times named it 2019 Restaurant of the Year.

Bavel was founded by the Israeli-American chef Ori Menashe and his American wife, chef Genevieve Gergis, who are also the founders and owners of the Italian restaurant Bestia in Downtown LA.

== Etymology ==
The name Bavel is the Modern Hebrew pronunciation of the biblical Babel. For the restaurateurs, it evokes "a time when the Middle East was one" because "Bavel is not specific to any one region."

== Menu ==
Bavel is particularly well known for its hummus and malawach.

== Reception ==
Bavel has enjoyed a positive reception from restaurant critics both in Los Angeles and nationally, including the Los Angeles Times, Bon Appetit, Eater, Food & Wine, Los Angeles, and others. It has also been featured in The New York Times several times, The Boston Globe, and The Jerusalem Post, among others.

=== Honors ===
Bavel was nominated for a James Beard Award for best new restaurant in the United States in 2019. Bavel was named the best restaurant of the year by the Los Angeles Times. It is listed in the 2019 California Michelin Guide with no stars.
