= Habib's =

Brazilian fast food company

- Type: Private
- Industry: Restaurants
- Founded: 1988; 38 years ago
- Headquarters: São Paulo, Brazil
- Key people: Alberto Saraiva, (Chairman)
- Products: Middle Eastern Cuisine
- Revenue: ▲US$ 2.6 billion (2012)
- Number of employees: 14,000
- Website: www.habibs.com.br

Habib's is a Brazilian fast food company that specialises in Middle Eastern cuisine and Brazilian sandwiches. It has more than 475 outlets (many of them self-owned) across the country and has recently begun expansion into foreign markets. It is known for very low prices and Lebanese-Brazilian dishes. Middle Eastern dishes are very popular in Brazil ever since the immigration of people from that area (particularly Lebanon and Syria) into Brazil.

== History ==
Habib's was founded by a Portuguese-born baker, Alberto Saraiva, who had no particular ties to the Middle East himself, got the idea early in 1988 after an ailing old man of Arab descent applied for a job in his bakery. With no job at hand for the man to apply to, but upon learning that he had been a cook back in his home land, Mr. Saraiva decided to open a small fast-food restaurant focused on Middle-Eastern fast-food, unheard at the time in Brazil, believing the success could rely on the novelty of it, and hired the man. The first Habib's restaurant was opened later that same year.

Before Habib's, Middle Eastern cuisine, despite being popular, was not readily available and the prices were usually high. The repressed demand was strong and people queued in front of the restaurant almost since the first day. Catering to this demand, Habib's soon started to grow and became one of Brazil's most thriving businesses. Habib's is currently the biggest Arabic fast-food franchise in the world and the third biggest fast-food company in Brazil.

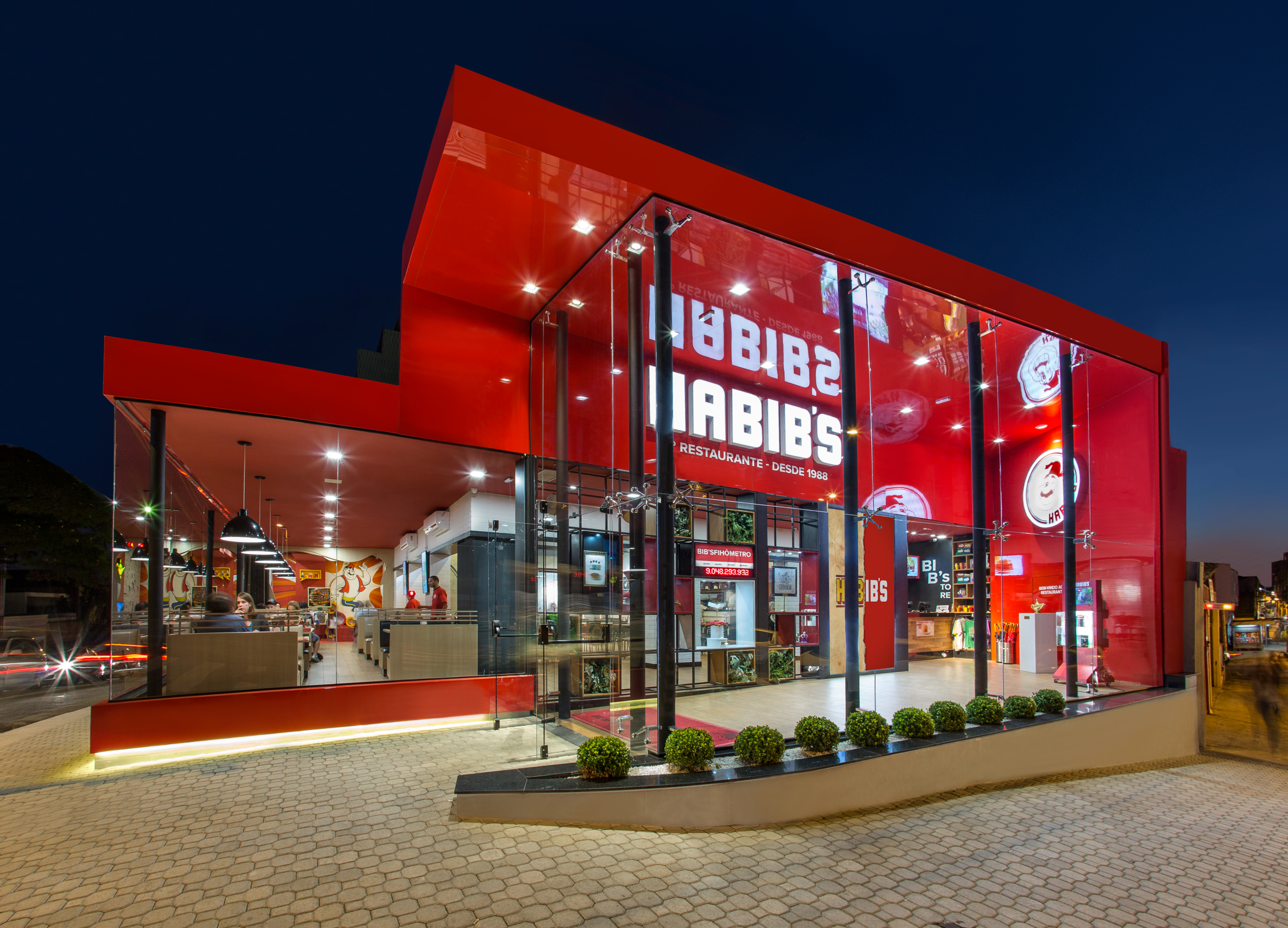
Habib's restaurant in São Paulo, Brazil.

== International expansion ==
Habib's has been probing the foreign market for quite some time, and attempts to set up stores across Mexico were made in 2001.
