= The Sudra =

Defunct restaurant chain based in Portland, Oregon, U.S.

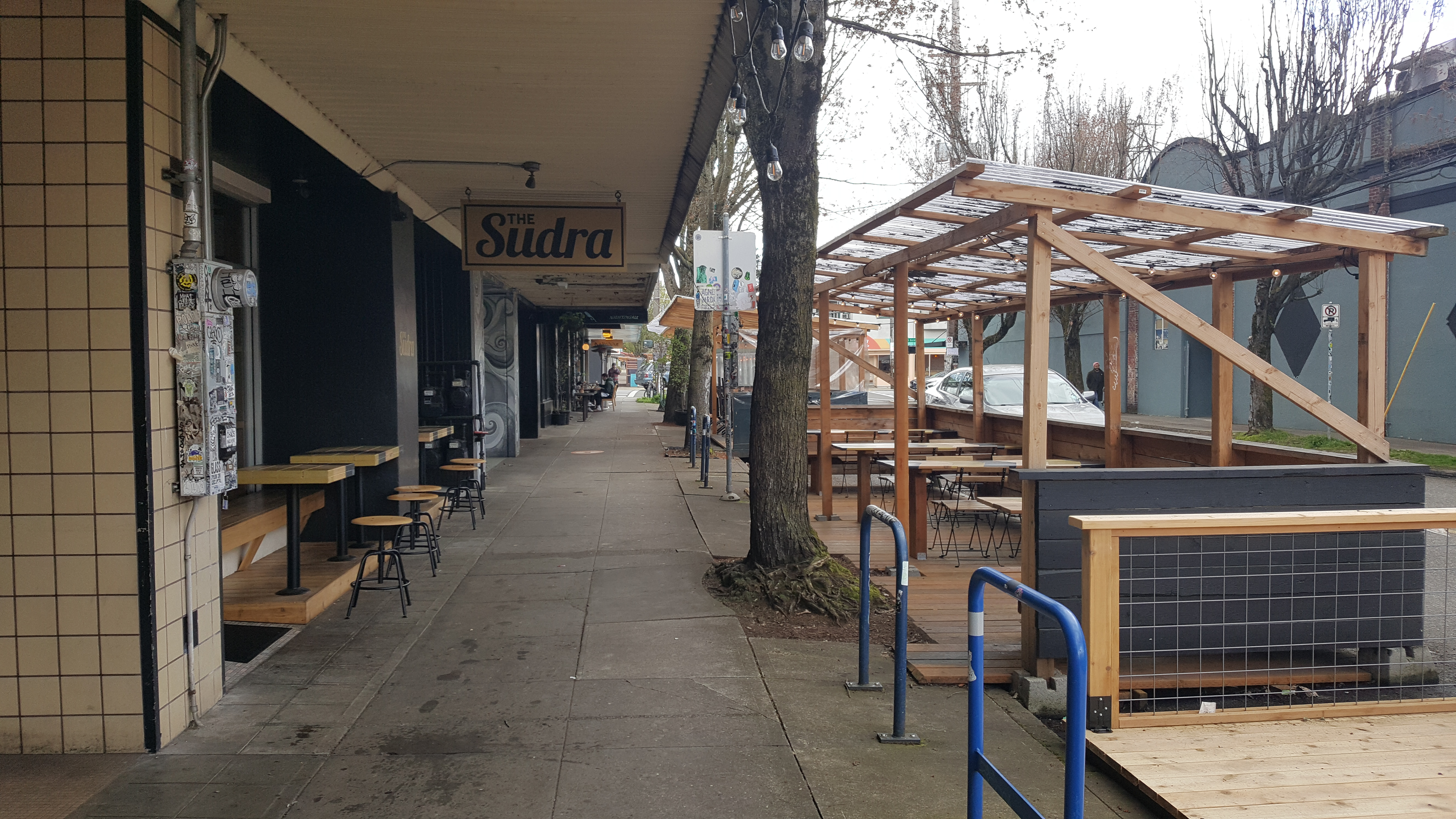
- Exterior of a location in Portland, Oregon, 2022

Restaurant information
- Established: 2013
- Closed: 2024
- Owner: Sanjay Chandran
- Food type: Indian; vegan; vegetarian
- Location: Portland; Beaverton, Oregon, United States

The Sudra was a small chain of Indian restaurants in the Portland metropolitan area, in the U.S. state of Oregon. There were four locations, including three in Portland and another in Beaverton. Sanjay Chandran operated the business from 2013 to 2024.

== Description ==
The Sudra was a small chain of casual counter service Indian restaurants that served vegan and vegetarian food in Portland and Beaverton, Oregon. It was named for Shudra, one of the four varnas of the Hindu caste and social system in ancient India. According to Eater Portland, food at The Sudra was also influenced by New Mexican cuisine.

=== Menu ===
The menu included chickpea "cutlets", korma, turmeric-roasted Brussels sprouts, kale-infused dosas with black-eyed peas, and potato masala. It also served roasted cauliflower with sweet-and-sour bell peppers, channa masala, ginger-agave roasted carrots, and soy chicken drumsticks with jalapeño chutney and soy yogurt. The Jackfruit Vindaloo Bowl has jackfruit, vegetables, vindaloo, and a kale salad, and the peacock salad has soy curls and roasted vegetables on raw kale. The Pakora Plate had pickled broccoli and cauliflower pakora, anasazi bean curry, kale with tahini, blueberry-mint chutney, cilantro-lemon sauce, radish, and brown basmati.

On the drink menu, the Beet Tequila had tequila, cilantro, garam masala, beet juice, and grapefruit juice. The Masala Film has mango puree with lime and ginger juice, and the mojito-like Bandit Queen has cucumber, lemon, and mint. The Sudra also served a vegan mango lassi with coconut yogurt and tamarind limeade.

== History ==
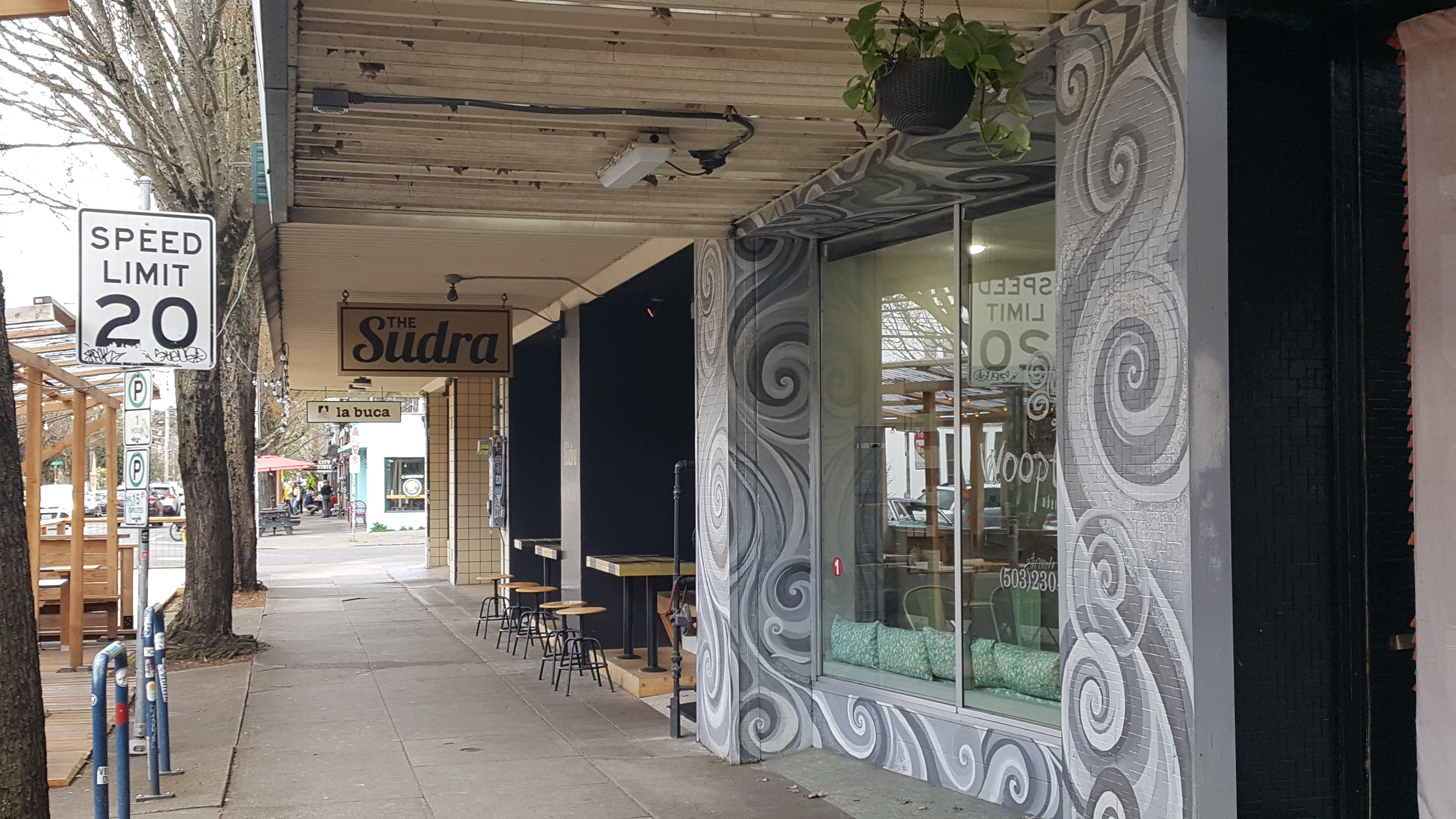
Exterior of the restaurant in northeast Portland in 2022

The Sudra was owned by Sanjay Chandran. The first location opened in northeast Portland 2013, in the space previously occupied by Basa Basa.

A second followed in the Two-Thirds complex, in the St. Johns neighborhood in May 2016. The location suffered a fire in June, and closed permanently in June 2019. Chanran opened another location on North Mississippi in July 2019. The Fremont location moved to 28th Avenue. In 2020, during the COVID-19 pandemic, the restaurant offered a holiday meal kit with soy "chicken" pakoras, cilantro herb potatoes, and Brussels sprouts.

Another outpost opened in northwest Portland's Pearl District in 2021, in the space that previously housed Aviv. The Pearl District location closed in 2022. The Sudra opened a location in Beaverton by 2023.

The North Mississippi and Beaverton locations closed in 2023. In late April 2024, Chandran announced plans to close the original location in May. His bar Bar Asha began operating from the same space.

== Reception ==
Eater Portland included The Sudra in a list of the city's "essential" vegan and vegetarian restaurants. Waz Wu included the business in the website's 2021 list of recommended restaurants in the city for "standout" vegan curries, and Janelle Lassalle and Thom Hilton included The Sudra in a 2024 list of Portland establishments for non-alcoholic mixed drinks. Ron Scott also included the restaurant in a 2024 overview of "exceptional" Indian food in the metropolitan area.

The Sudra was a runner-up in the Best Indian Restaurant of Willamette Week's annual readers' poll in 2020. It was also a runner-up in the same poll's Best Vegetarian/Vegan Restaurant category in 2022.

== See also ==
- List of Indian restaurants
- List of restaurant chains in the United States
- List of vegetarian and vegan restaurants
