= Michael Rafidi =

Palestinian American chef

Michael Lee Rafidi (c. 1985) is a Palestinian American chef and restaurateur. Rafidi was named the 2024 the James Beard Foundation's Outstanding Chef of the Year and also owns the Michelin star restaurant, Albi.

== Career ==
Rafidi worked at Michael Mina’s restaurant RN74 in San Francisco, California. At RN74, Rafidi held the role of executive chef.

In 2017, Rafidi moved to Washington, D.C. and became the executive chef at Arroz, a Spanish restaurant owned by restaurateur Mike Isabella. He also became the executive chef at another one of Mike Isabella's restaurants Requin, which was located on The Wharf but has since closed.

In March 2018, Rafidi stepped away from his positions at Arroz and Requin several days after a lawsuit made public sexual harassment allegations against Mike Isabella and several associates; however, Rafidi did not explicitly state the lawsuit was the reason for his departure. In that same month, The RAMMY Awards nominated Rafidi as a finalist for Rising Culinary Star of the Year.

In February 2020, Rafidi opened Albi, located in Washington, D.C's Navy Yard.

In March 2022, Rafidi was named as a semifinalist in for the James Beard Awards in the "Best Chef: Mid-Atlantic (D.C., DE, MD, NJ, PA, VA)" category. In June of that same year, Rafidi’s restaurant Albi earned a Michelin Star. Also in 2022, Rafidi opened Yellow in Georgetown, a sister restaurant to Albi that also focuses on Levantine-inspired cuisine.

In 2023, Rafidi was nominated as a finalist for the James Beard Awards in the "Best Chef: Mid-Atlantic (D.C., DE, MD, NJ, PA, VA)" category.

In June 2024, Rafidi was named The James Beard Foundation's Outstanding Chef of the Year. He dedicated his win to “to Palestine and to all the Palestinian people out there, whether it's here or in Palestine or all over the world”. In July 2024, he opened a new and expanded 3,500-square-foot flagship and test kitchen for Yellow located in Union Market. In September of that same year, Rafidi opened a third restaurant, La' Shukran that is styled after a French bistro and located in Union Market on top of his Yellow location.
