= Middle Eastern cuisine =

Culinary tradition

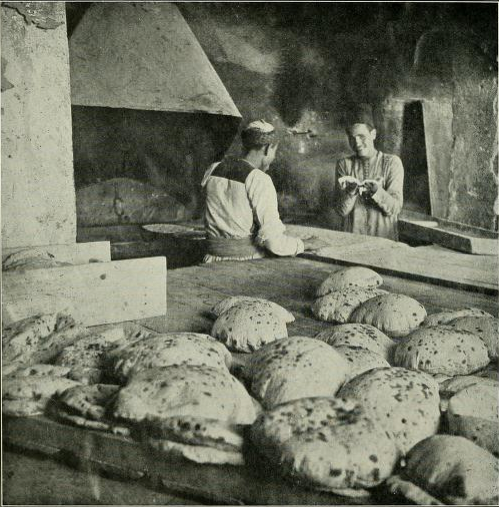
Middle East bakery in the 1910s. Photo by National Geographic

Middle Eastern cuisine includes a number of cuisines from the Middle East. Common ingredients include olives and olive oil, pitas, honey, sesame seeds, dates, sumac, chickpeas, mint, rice and parsley, and popular dishes include kebabs, dolmas, falafel, baklava, yogurt, doner kebab, shawarma and mulukhiyah.

== Geography ==
Core countries considered to be part of the Middle East

The exact countries considered to be part of the Middle East are difficult to determine as the definition has changed over time and from source to source. Currently, the countries that are considered to comprise the Middle East are: Bahrain, Cyprus, Egypt, Iran, Iraq, Israel, Jordan, Kuwait, Palestine, Lebanon, Oman, Qatar, Saudi Arabia, Syria, Turkey, United Arab Emirates, and Yemen, including the various ethnic, cultural, religious and ethno-linguistic groups within these nations.

== Varieties ==
- Arab cuisine
- Armenian cuisine
- Assyrian cuisine
- Azerbaijani cuisine
- Bahraini cuisine
- Balochi cuisine
- Cypriot cuisine
- Eastern Arabian cuisine
- Egyptian cuisine
- Emirati cuisine
- Georgian cuisine
- Iranian cuisine
- Iraqi cuisine
- Israeli cuisine
- Jordanian cuisine
- Kurdish cuisine
- Kuwaiti cuisine
- Lebanese cuisine
- Levantine cuisine
- Omani cuisine
- Palestinian cuisine
- Pontic Greek cuisine
- Qatari cuisine
- Saudi Arabian cuisine
- Syrian cuisine
- Turkish cuisine
- Yemeni cuisine

== History and influences ==
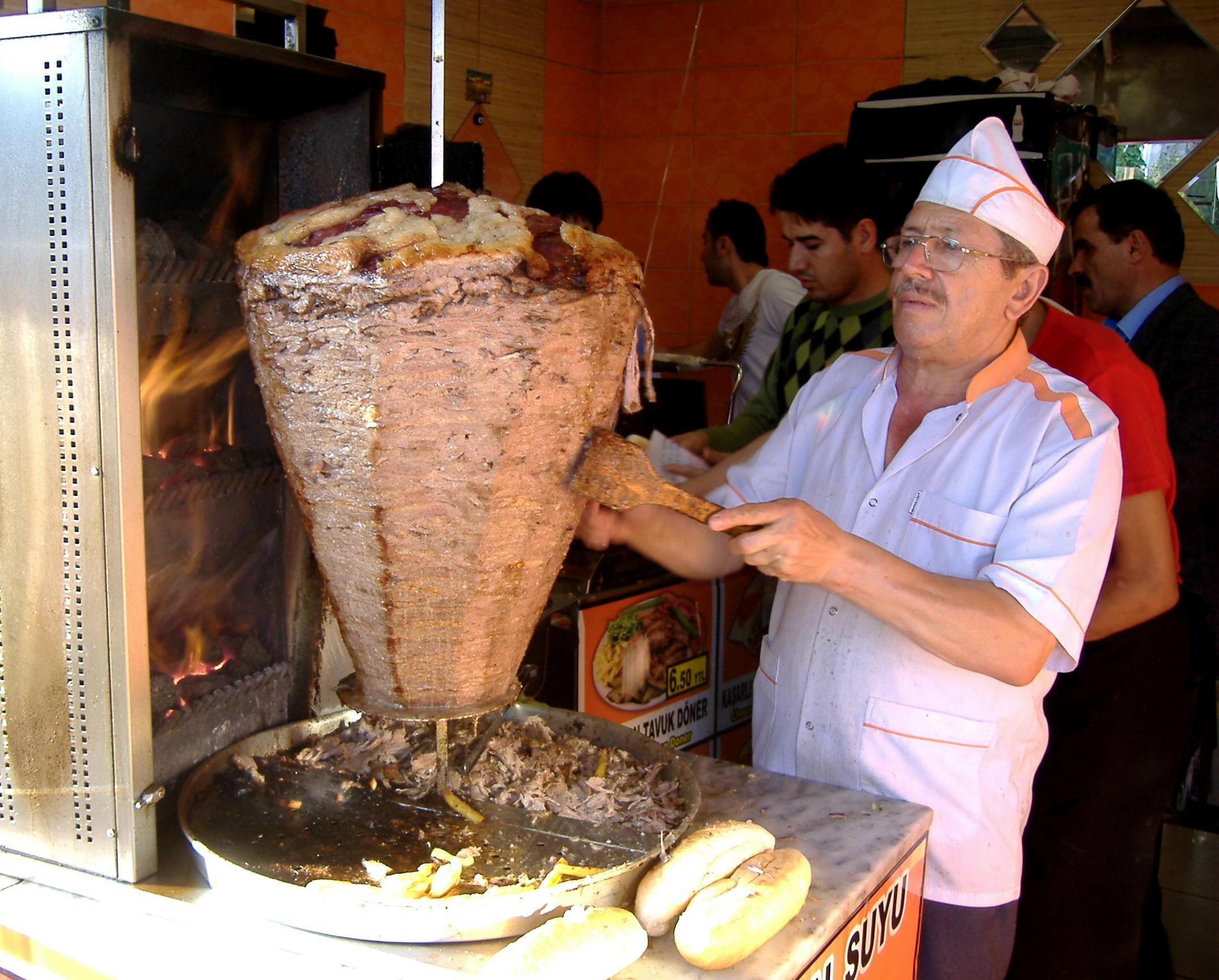
The Turkish döner kebap

The Middle East incorporates the Fertile Crescent, including Mesopotamia (Sumer, Akkad, Assyria and Babylonia) where wheat was first cultivated, followed by rye, barley, lentils, beans, pistachios, figs, pomegranates, dates and other regional staples. The domestication of sheep, goats and cattle took place in the region as well. Fermentation was also discovered there, in order to leaven bread and make beer in Ancient Mesopotamia and Ancient Egypt and Mesopotamia. Additionally, the earliest written recipes come from that region.

As a crossroad between Europe, North Africa, and Asia, it has been a hub of food and recipe exchange. During the first Persian Empire (ca. 550–330 BCE), the foundation was laid for modern Middle-Eastern food when rice, poultry and fruits were incorporated into the local diet. Figs, dates and nuts were brought by merchants to conquered lands, and spices were brought from the Orient.

The region was also influenced by dumplings from Mongol invaders; turmeric and other spices from India; cloves, peppercorns and allspice from the Spice Islands; okra from Africa, and tomatoes from the New World.

Religion has impacted the cuisine by making lamb the primary meat since both Jews and Muslims do not eat pork, although the cuisines of Christian peoples such as Assyrians, Armenians, Cypriots and Maronites can incorporate pork.

The Qur'an forbids alcohol consumption, which is why non-Islamic countries produce and export alcohol. Prime example would be wine made in Lebanon, in vineyards such as Château Ksara, Chateau Kefraya and Chateau Masaya which have gained international recognition. Château Ksara is also known for its arak ksarak. Al-Maza is Lebanon's primary brewery, and once it was the Middle East's only beer producer. Assyrian communities in Iraq, Turkey and Syria have long produced their own Wheat Beer, Wine and Arak.

Before the 1979 change of regime, Iran was noted for its wine production.

Under the Ottoman Empire, sweet pastries of paper-thin phyllo dough and thick coffee were brought and introduced to the region.

== Elements ==
=== Grains ===
Grains are the basis of the Middle Eastern diet, where wheat and rice are considered staple foods. Barley is also widely used in the region, and maize in addition has become common in some areas. Bread is a universal food eaten in some form by all classes at nearly every meal.

In addition to bread, wheat is also used in burghul and couscous. Burghul is cracked wheat made by partially cooking wheat grains in water, drying them in an oven (or in the sun), and breaking them into pieces. It is typically cooked in water with flavorings, much like rice.

Burghul is also used in meat pies and as an ingredient in salads (notably in tabbouleh with chopped parsley, tomato, lemon, and oil). Freekeh is another common grain, made from immature green wheat.

Many types of rice are produced and consumed in the region. Plain rice is served under grilled meats or in meat and vegetable stews. More complex rice dishes have layers of meat, vegetables, sauces, nuts, or dried fruits.

=== Flavorings ===
Butter and clarified butter (also known as smen), also ghee, are traditionally the preferred oil to cook in. Also, olive oil is prevalent in Mediterranean coastal areas, where Christians use it during the Lenten and other fasts which disallow meat and dairy products. and Jews use it instead of animal fats (such as butter) to avoid combining meat and dairy products.

Scented waters like rose water and orange flower water are frequently used in desserts, they are usually added into qatir; a syrup that is used in a significant portion of different Arab and Middle Eastern sweets, it is made by boiling sugar, scented water, and lemon juice together, the exact proportions vary by dish.

Most regions in the Middle East use spices. A typical stew will include a small amount of cinnamon, nutmeg, cloves, cumin, and coriander. Black pepper is popular and chili peppers are used occasionally, especially as a sauce or as pickles. Parsley and mint are widely used in cooking and in salads.

Thyme and thyme blends (za'atar) are common among Syria, Lebanon, Jordan, Palestine and Israel, in addition to a mixture of dried thyme and sumac (crushed sour berries) which is prevalent at breakfast with oil and bread. Sumac is also sprinkled over grilled meat and garlic is frequently used in many dishes and salads.

=== Religious influence ===
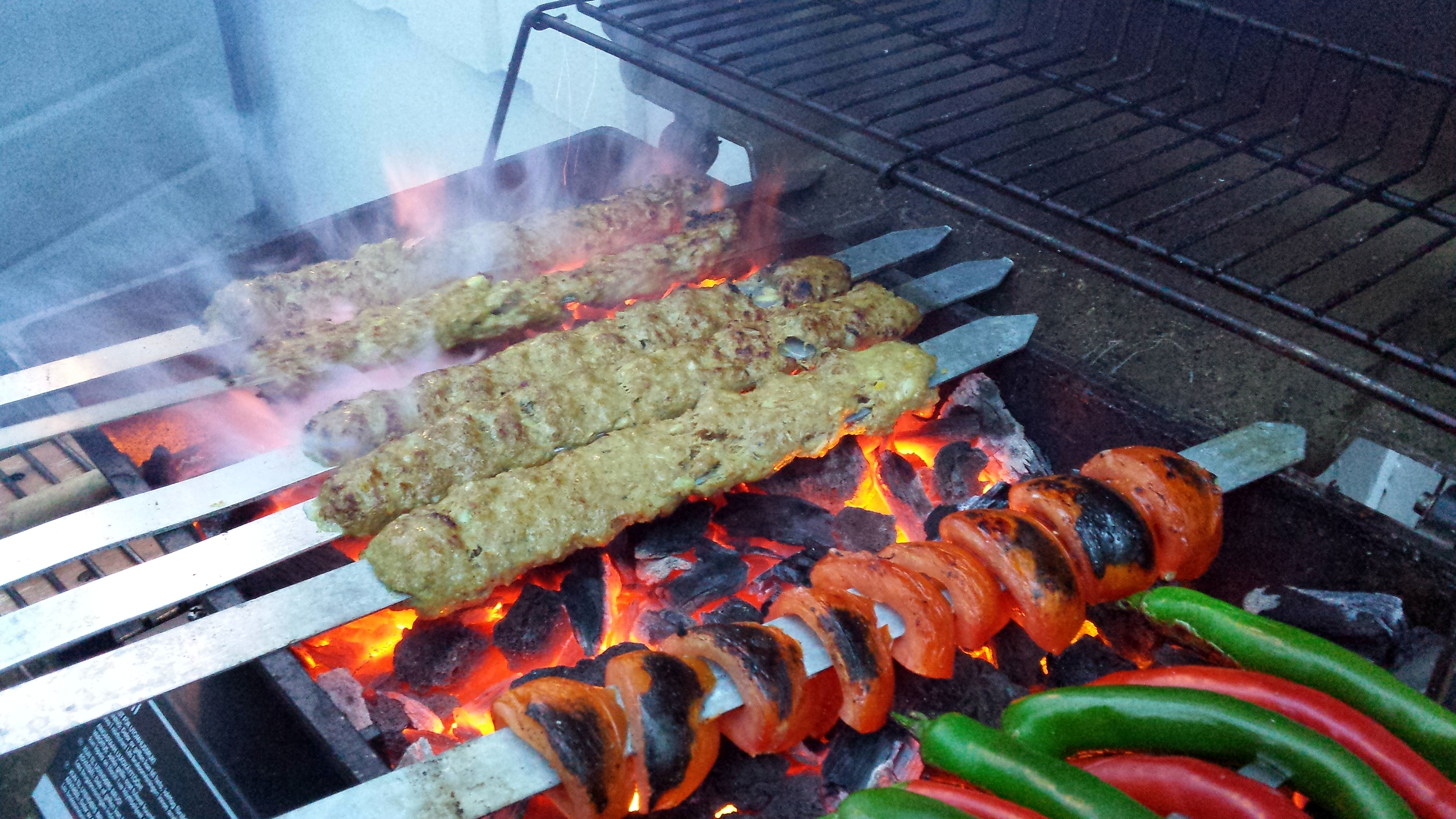
Kebab koobideh

Lamb and mutton are favored meats, since pork is prohibited by both Islamic and Jewish dietary laws, though Christian and other non Muslim or Jewish communities consume pork, and Chicken is also common in many Middle Eastern cuisines.

Grilled meats (kebabs) are popular, with many regional varieties. The most popular is cubed lamb on skewers (shish kebab), and chicken that may also be grilled in the same fashion. Another extensive variety is kofta kebab, made from ground meat mixed with onions and spices, shaped around the skewer like a sausage and grilled. Kebabs are typically street or restaurant food, served with bread, salad and pickles, and are not usually prepared at home.

Meat and vegetable stews are served with rice, bulgur, or bread. Kibbeh is a pie (or dumpling) made with meat and cereal.

The most popular kibbeh is made with ground meat (typically lamb) and burghul, worked together into a dough and stuffed with minced meat fried with onion, herbs and sometimes pine nuts, or almonds and raisins, prepared as individual small dumplings (shaped like a torpedo) or sliced like a cake and baked on an oven tray with two layers of stuffed dough.

Another variation of kibbeh is kibbeh naye, made by pounding raw meat and burghul with seasonings, served with lemon juice and chili sauce for dipping.

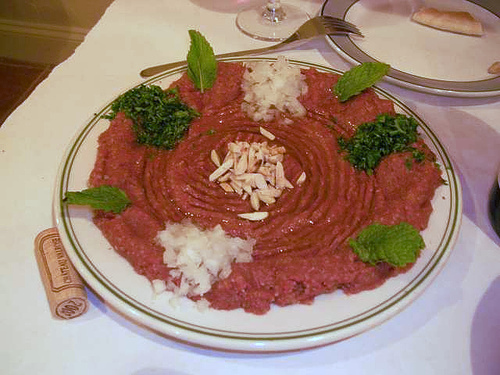
Kibbeh nayyeh

=== Vegetables ===
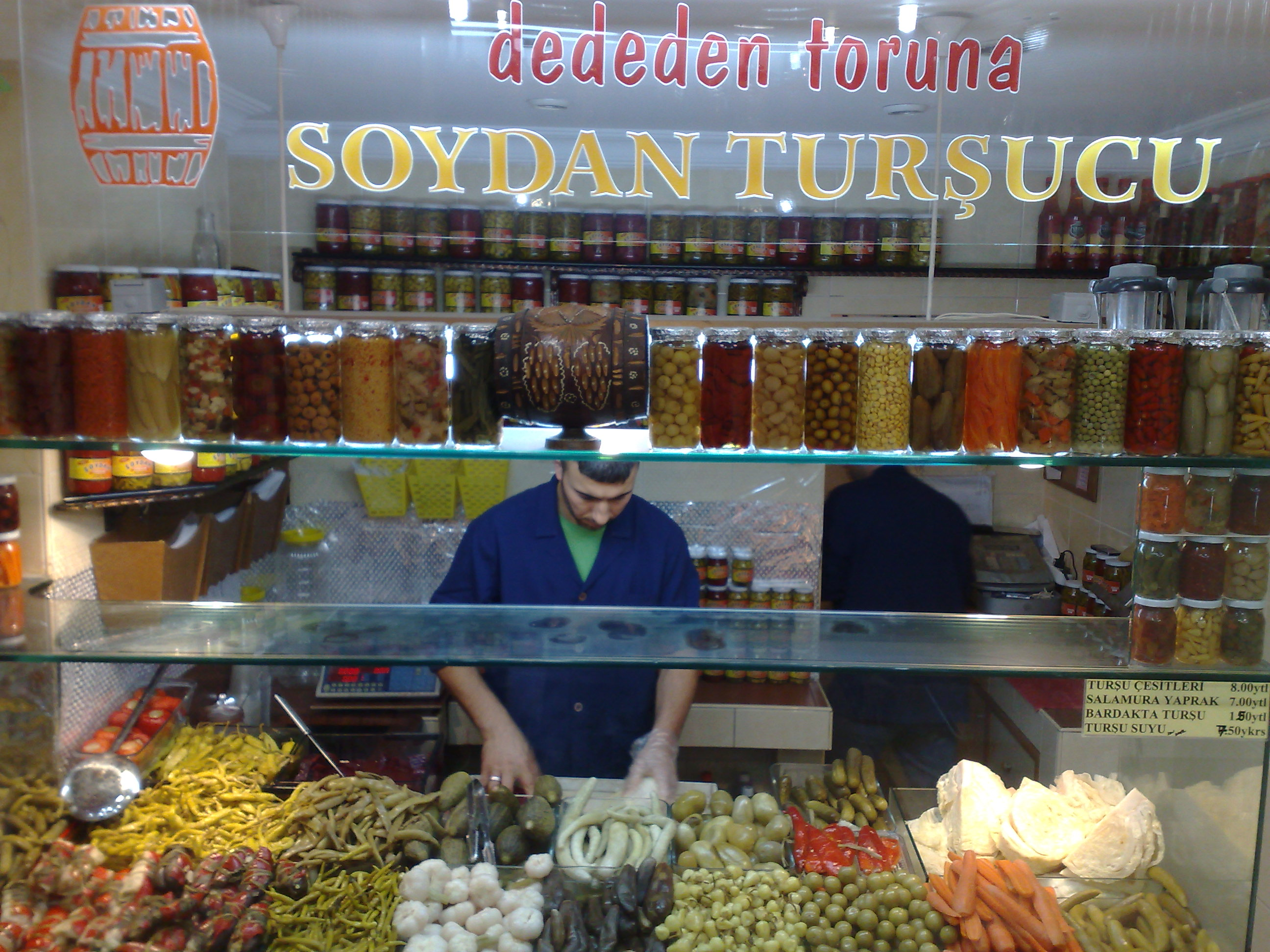
Tursu are pickled vegetables served in many Balkan and Middle East countries

Vegetables and pulses are staple foods, and are boiled, stewed, grilled, stuffed, and cooked with meat and rice. Leaf vegetables include many varieties of cabbage, spinach, and chard. Root vegetables, such as onions, garlic, carrots, turnips, and beets, are also popular in the region.

Squash, tomato, eggplant, and okra are distinctive elements of the region's cuisine. Eggplant is often sliced, fried and dressed with yogurt and garlic. Baba ghanoush is eggplant roasted over an open fire, mashed and dressed with tahini (sesame paste), lemon juice, garlic, and cumin.

Tomato is the most ubiquitous ingredient in Middle-Eastern cookery, used fresh in salads, cooked in stews and broth, and grilled with kebab.

Beans and pulses are crucial to the regional diet, second only to cereals. Fava beans are eaten both green and dried. Dried fava beans are boiled into ful medames, one of the most popular Egyptian domestic and street foods. As for mashed fava beans, they are dressed with oil, lemon, and chili. Similar dishes are found throughout the region.

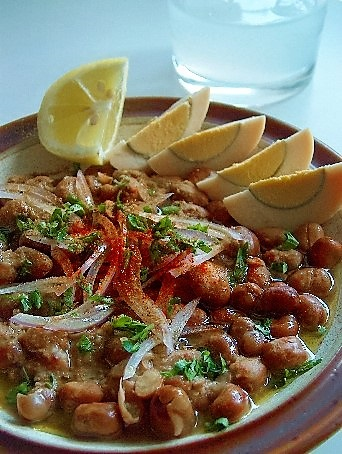
Ful medames served with sliced hard-boiled eggs

Falafel, which is popular in Europe and the United States, was originally made from dried fava beans formed into a rissole with herbs and spices and then fried. It is also made from chickpeas, or a blend of the two. Green fava are cooked like other green beans, boiled and dressed with oil or stewed with meat. Haricots and black-eyed peas are also well-known.

Lentils, split peas and chickpeas are widely used in soups and salads, with rice or meat. Hummus, made from chickpeas and tahini

=== Dishes ===
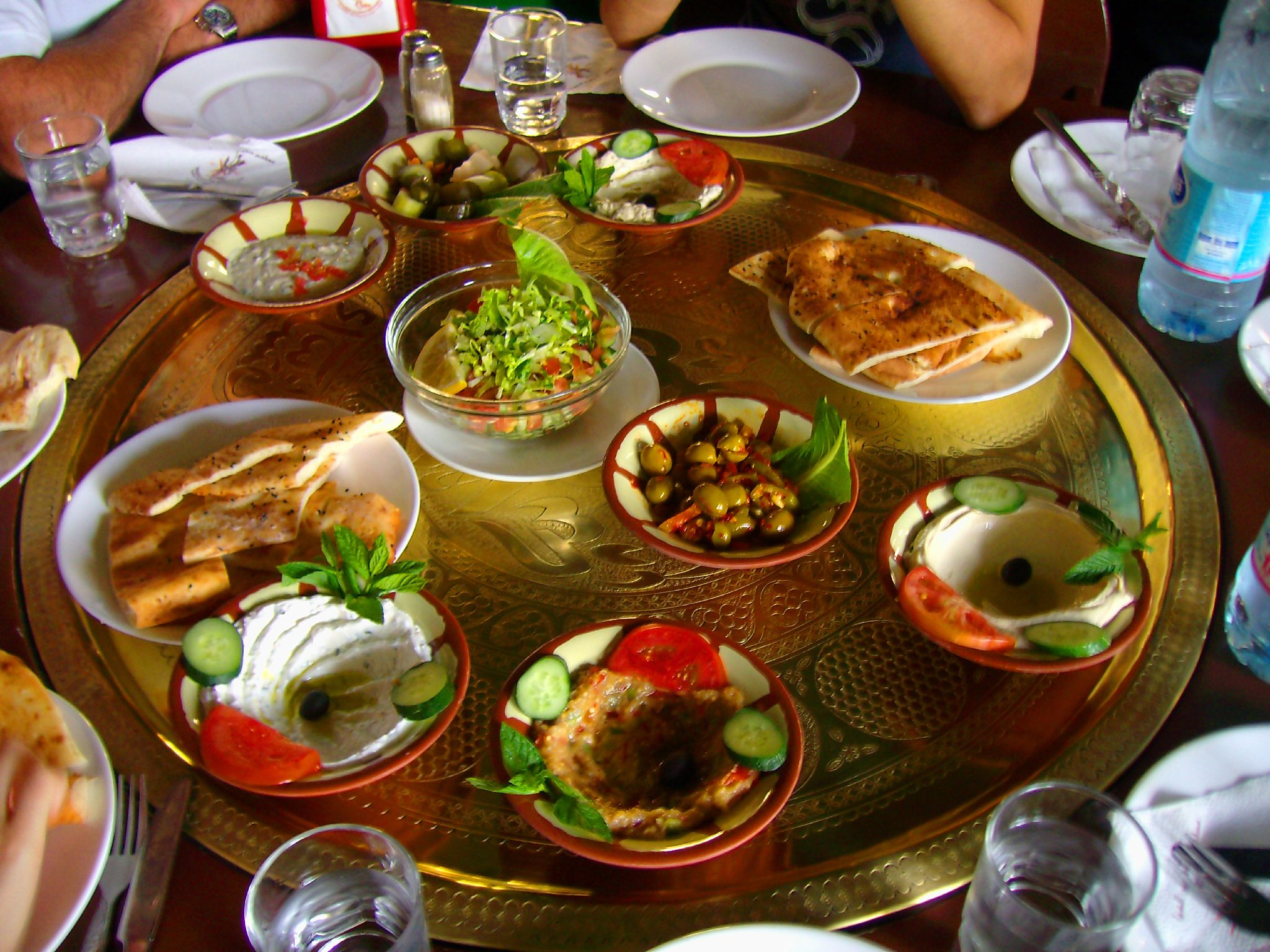
Meze is a selection of small dishes served with alcoholic drinks, as a course or as appetizers in Arab countries, Turkic countries, and Iran.

Stuffed vegetables, a dish associated with Middle Eastern cuisine, is commonly called dolma (Turkish for "stuffed") or mahshi. Grape leaves, chard, and cabbage are stuffed with rice, ground meat, pine nuts and spices, and stewed in oil and tomatoes. Many vegetables, such as squash, onion, tomato, eggplant, peppers and carrots, are similarly stuffed and stewed (or baked).

Meze is popular throughout the Middle East. It consists of several small dishes (cheese, melon, nuts, salads and dips such as tabbouleh, hummus and mutabbal, and pickles) and more substantial items, such as grilled meat, kibbeh, and sausage.

Middle Easterners frequently consume milk, fresh or soured. Yogurt is commonly consumed plain, also used in cooking as in salad dressing, or diluted as a drink. Greek feta and halloumi are the region's most popular cheeses.

== Beverages ==
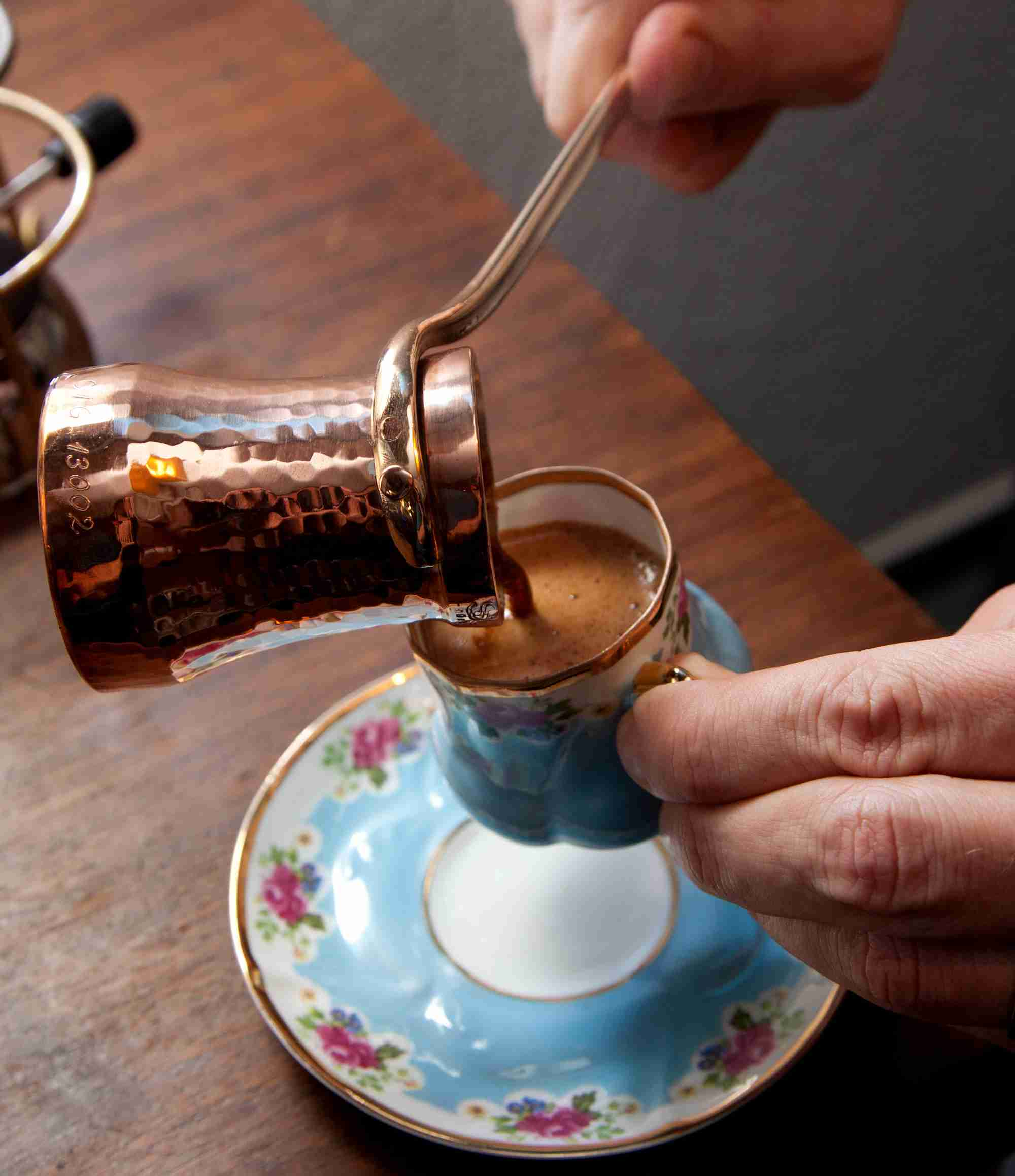
Turkish coffee

Turkish coffee is a beverage well known internationally. Thicker than other coffee, it is made by boiling finely-ground coffee in water and letting the grounds settle. During the 1980s, instant coffee became popular. The simple drink of coffee may serve the sole purpose of caffeine to many; however, it serves a multitude of traditional and cultural purposes in Iraq. Oftentimes, peace between families, marriage proposals, and significant life events are initiated by the serving of coffee.

Arabic coffee is another of type of coffee that is common throughout the middle east, it is boiled in a dallah or cezve, and often spiced with cardamom and/or other spices, and served without sugar.

Arak is a distilled, anise-flavored alcoholic drink, usually diluted with water and ice, and served in social gatherings with meze.

Some Christians, such as the Assyrians, Armenians, Cypriots, and Maronites make their own beer and wine.

Qamar al-Din, a thick, sweet apricot beverage, is drunk by Muslims during Ramadan. Apricots are boiled with sugar and water until they are thick, and sun-dried on wooden planks. The dried fruit is then mixed with water and sugar.

Jallab is a fruit syrup made from grape molasses, dates and rose water served over crushed ice, sometimes with raisins or pine nuts.

Doogh (or ayran) is a salted, yogurt-based beverage which is popular in Turkey and Iran.

== Dining etiquette ==
=== Ramadan ===
During Ramadan, food consumption increases dramatically in Muslim communities. Breaking the daily sunrise-to-sunset fast is a banquet with family and friends whereas public banquets are held by charities and other associations.

Cafes and pastry shops are open at night, and the streets have a carnival atmosphere. Many Muslims, following Muhammad's reported example, break their fast with a date followed by a variety of dishes. Sweet pastries and puddings are always present on Ramadan nights.

The end of Ramadan is marked by Eid al-Fitr, featuring a great quantity and variety of sweets and pastries.

The other major Muslim feast is the four-day Eid al-Adha, the Feast of the Sacrifice, which occurs during Dhu al-Hijjah (the pilgrimage month). An animal (usually a sheep or goat) is slaughtered in every household that can afford it, great banquets are prepared, and food is given to the poor.

=== Arab countries ===
In some Arab countries, especially in the Persian Gulf region, it is common for diners to take their food from a communal plate in the center of the table. They traditionally do not use forks or spoons; instead they scoop up the food with pita or a thumb and two fingers.

In Arabic culture, the left hand is considered unclean and even left-handed people eat with the right hand. A common exception, however, is that the left hand may hold a drinking glass when eating greasy food with the right.

It is proper etiquette to compliment the host on their food and hospitality, and to try every plate on the table. If a guest does not leave food on his plate, the host generally fills it immediately.

==== Iraq ====
The working people of Iraq choose to start the day off with kahi, which is made of thin pastry dough.

=== Iran ===
Persian dishes and foods are known for being rice-based and Iran has been popular for its wide rice production. Dishes are typically served as savory or sweet in a single setting, rather than in courses.

In traditional Iranian restaurants, a large, low table lined with Persian rugs and with cushions around the sides is the setting for a meal. Diners sit cross-legged in a circle around the table and the food is presented in various plates in the center of the table. The food is then placed on separate plates for each diner and eaten with cutlery. Tea is served in kamar bârik ("narrow-waist") glasses with saffronized sugar and Persian sweets.

When entertaining dinner guests at home, it is seen as discourteous to serve just enough food, so food is prepared in high quantities. An important Persian practice is taarof (ritual politeness) where if a person is offered food or drink, they will initially politely decline. Only after the host has offered repeatedly, it is accepted and that is to avoid appearing greedy.

=== Turkey ===
Tea is usually served in curved glasses which are held by the lip to which water may be added. A cup of tea may be refilled if it is less than half full. An honored guest is expected to make a toast, usually soon after the host does or at the end of the meal. A toast is usually being made with a glass of wine, rakı, or just water.

Forks, spoons and knives are used. Sometimes, the knife is held in the right hand and the fork in the left, presenting the British-style. Smoking may be acceptable between courses of a dinner.

In formal situations and with more traditionalist company, the hosts sit at the head of the table, with the honored guest next to them on the side of the table which is farthest from the door.

The honored guest is served first, and then it's customary to serve from elder guests to younger, with a bias in favour of men. Diners do not begin eating until the oldest person at the table begins eating.

In some informal restaurants, dishes are ordered when desired (not all at once at the beginning of a meal). At informal restaurants a table may be shared, but diners are not required to converse.

Guests may be required to remove their shoes. It is customary to say Afiyet olsun ("May what you eat bring well-being") before or after eating, and to say Elinize sağlik ("Bless your hand", a compliment for the manual, i.e. "hand" labour involved in cooking) to whoever prepared the meal after a meal.

== Globalization ==
In 2017, Middle-Eastern cuisine was reportedly one of the most popular and fastest-growing ethnic cuisines in the US. Dishes such as hummus and falafel are becoming increasingly common in restaurants across the United States. In 2020, Datassential reported that there are "nearly 3,300 Middle Eastern restaurants, almost 100 more than last year. That's about 0.5% of the total U.S. restaurant population".

Middle-Eastern cuisine is often misrepresented as simply interchangeable with Mediterranean food in Western markets.

=== Criticism of the label ===
Chef Fadi Kattan has criticized the label, saying "Sadly we self-orientalize under labels such as Middle-Eastern, Levantine or Mediterranean cuisine, which don’t mean anything, to me.", he goes on to say that some cuisines that are both labelled as "Middle Eastern" or "Mediterranean" have very little in common, such as those of Northern Algeria and Marseille.

Author Reem Kassis, writing for The Atlantic, states that some restaurants in cities like New York and London are beginning to "differentiate themselves by labeling their cuisine Lebanese or Palestinian or Syrian", as opposed to the "Middle Eastern" label made possible by globalization, citing cultural appropriation as a possible reason.

== See also ==
- List of Middle Eastern dishes
- North African cuisine: Berber cuisine, Moroccan cuisine, Algerian cuisine, Tunisian cuisine, Libyan cuisine and Egyptian cuisine
- Arab cuisine
- Balkan cuisine
- Somali cuisine
- Sudanese cuisine
- Ottoman cuisine
- Levantine cuisine
- Mediterranean cuisine
- Mizrahi Jewish cuisine
- Jewish cuisine
- Islamic dietary laws
- Jewish dietary laws
