= Ya Hala =

Restaurant in Portland, Oregon, U.S.

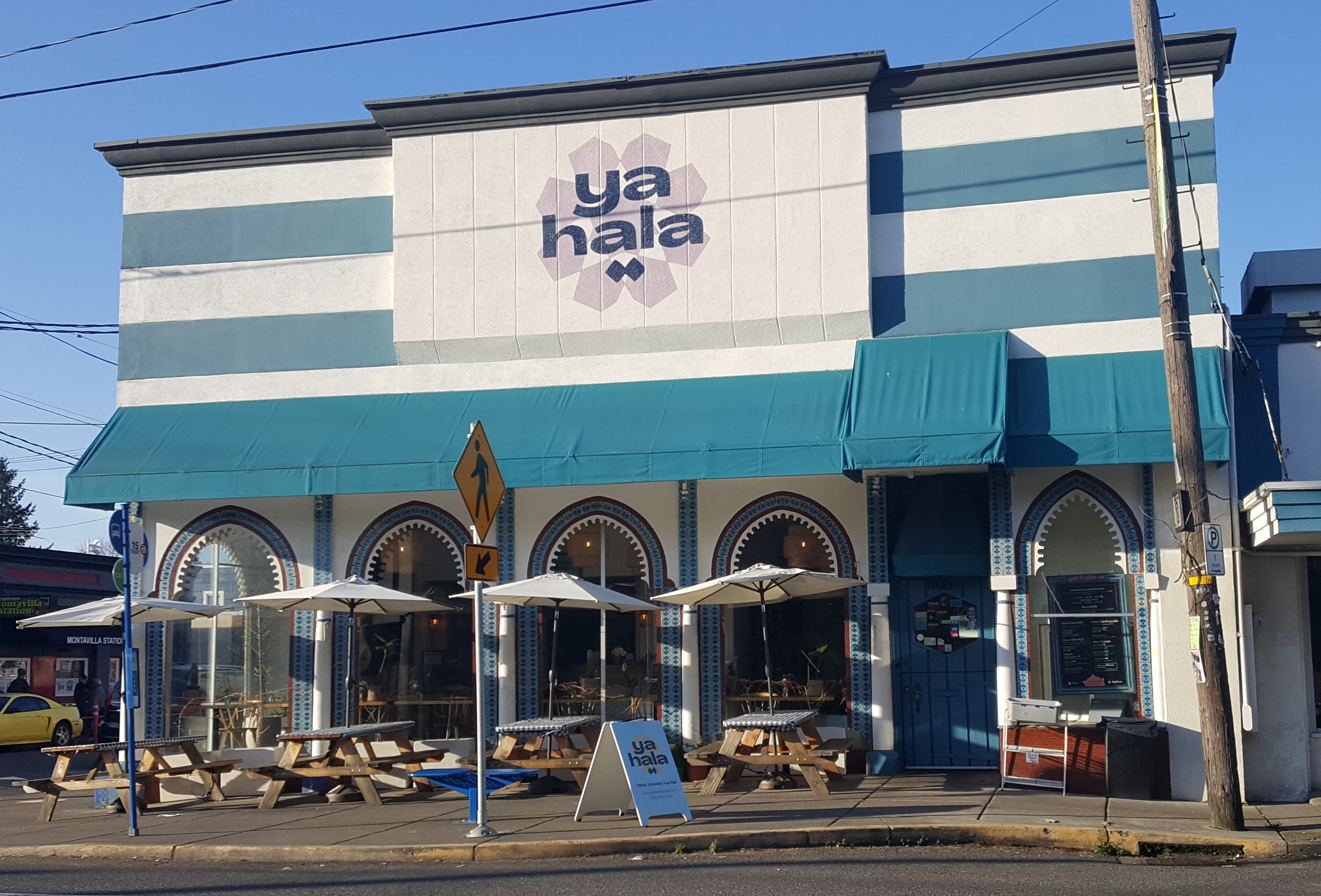
- The restaurant's exterior in 2022
- Interactive map of Ya Hala

Restaurant information
- Established: 1999
- Owners: Mirna Attar; John Attar
- Chef: Mirna Attar
- Food type: Lebanese; Middle Eastern
- Location: 8005 Southeast Stark Street, Portland, Multnomah, Oregon, 97215, United States
- Coordinates: 45.5193°N 122.5813°W
- Website: yahalarestaurant.com

Ya Hala Lebanese Cuisine, or simply Ya Hala, is a Lebanese and Middle Eastern restaurant in Portland, Oregon, United States. The business was established as a deli counter in 1999.

== Description ==
Ya Hala ("welcome" in Lebanese) is a Lebanese and Middle Eastern restaurant in the southeast Portland part of the Montavilla neighborhood. Martin Cizmar of Willamette Week has described the restaurant as "cavernous". Lauren Carlos and Michelle DeVona of Eater Portland wrote, "Huge murals grace the walls at this homey ... standby, where visitors find homestyle Lebanese food as well as classic street fare".

In 2013, The Astorian said the menu "offers Lebanese food that you might eat in someone's home, rather than the more standard fare". The menu has included falafel, shakshuka pita and hummus, lamb bacon and shanks, meatballs, eggs, sujuk and beef kafta kebabs, and burgers with arugula, eggplant, and tahini-Dijon dressing on a brioche bun. Lamb is also served as shawarma, kabobs, or kofta with shakshuka.

Portland Monthly said: "At its new brunch, this Montavilla standby takes a detour from its Middle East playbook. Instead, the restaurant spice-routes American greasy-spoon dishes alongside pots of fragrant Turkish coffee and traditional Lebanese breakfast fare." Ya Hala uses the Lebanese coffee brand Najjar as of 2001.

In 2003, The Oregonian described the restaurant's exterior as "inviting" and "plant-adorned".

== History ==
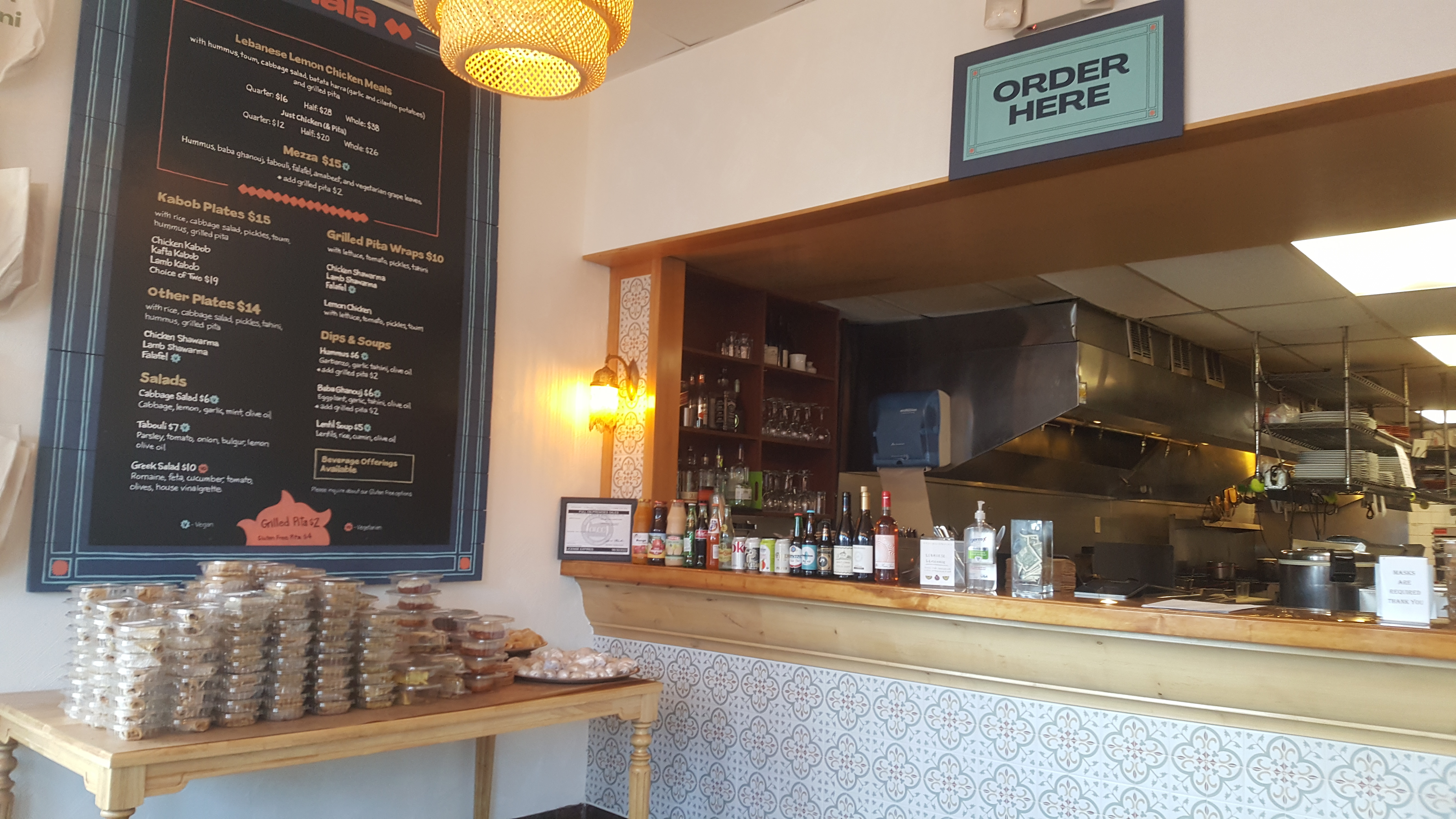
Interior order counter, 2022

The family-owned restaurant was established as a deli counter in 1999. The Attar family also owns Barbur World Foods and International Food Supply. Mirna and John Attar are co-owners; Mirna also serves as chef as of 2020. She is the daughter of Nicholas Restaurant founders Nicholas and Linda Dibe, and the sister of Hoda Khouri, the owner and chef of Hoda's. Pascal Attar is also associated with Ya Hala.

Ya Hala began serving brunch in 2015. The restaurant's exterior was painted in 2016. In 2021, Ya Hala's marquee logo was repainted and the text "Ya Hala Lebanese Plates – Established 1999" was changed to "ya hala" in lowercase. Ya Hala participated in the Portland Bloody Mary Festival, which was hosted by the Bloody Mary Liberation Party at Redd on Salmon Street, in 2019. In 2023, Mirna Attar began serving a new prix fixe menu in a dedicated space called the Fairuz Room. According to Eater Portland, the rotating dishes "meld Attar's memories of Lebanon with Pacific Northwestern ingredients," such as asparagus moussaka, beef shanks with Swiss chard kibbeh, and kishk soup with black garlic toast. The Fairuz Room also has cocktails and wines unavailable to guests in the primary dining area.

The restaurant participated in Portland's Dumpling Week in 2026.

== Reception ==
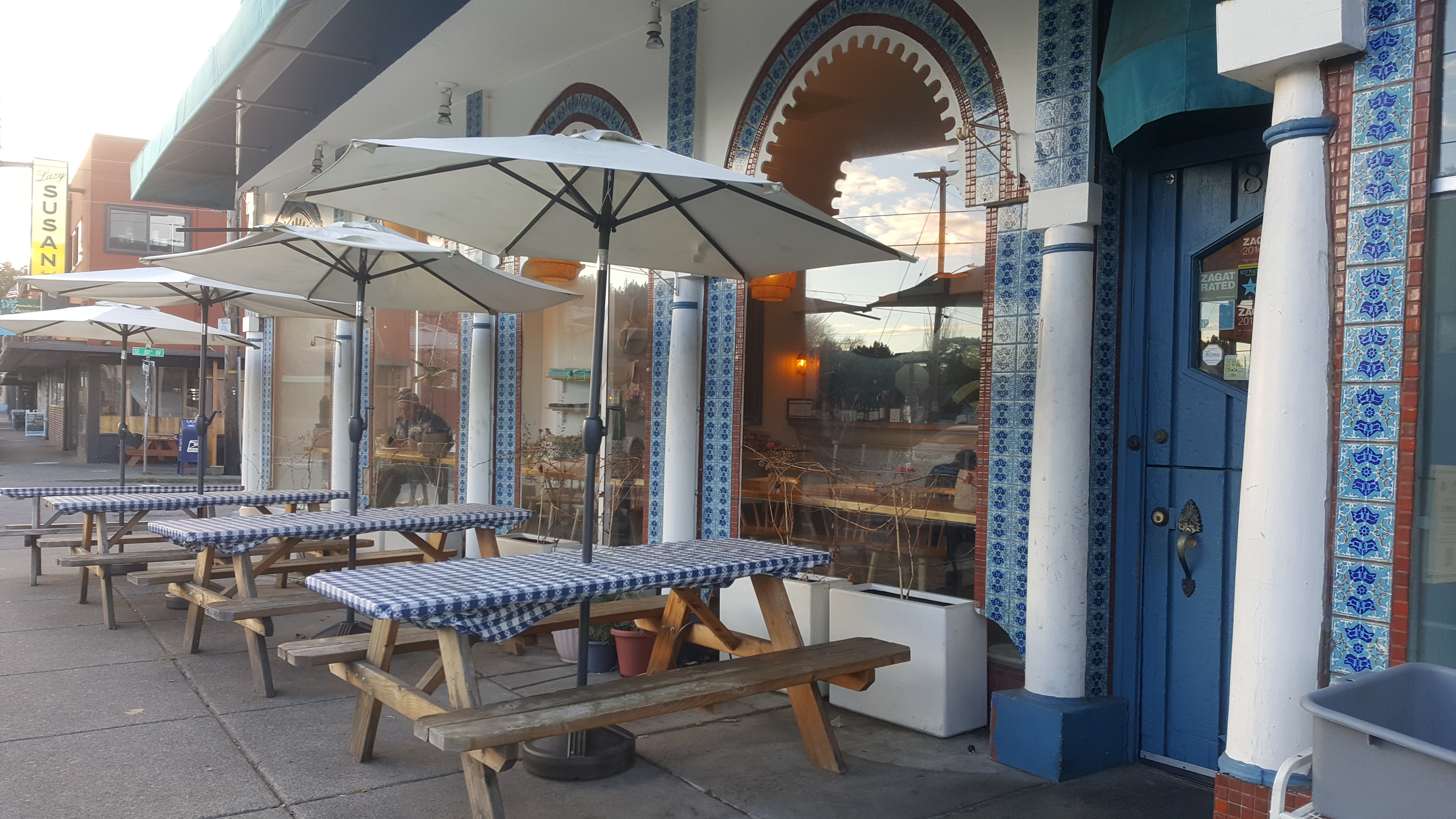
Outdoor dining tables, 2022

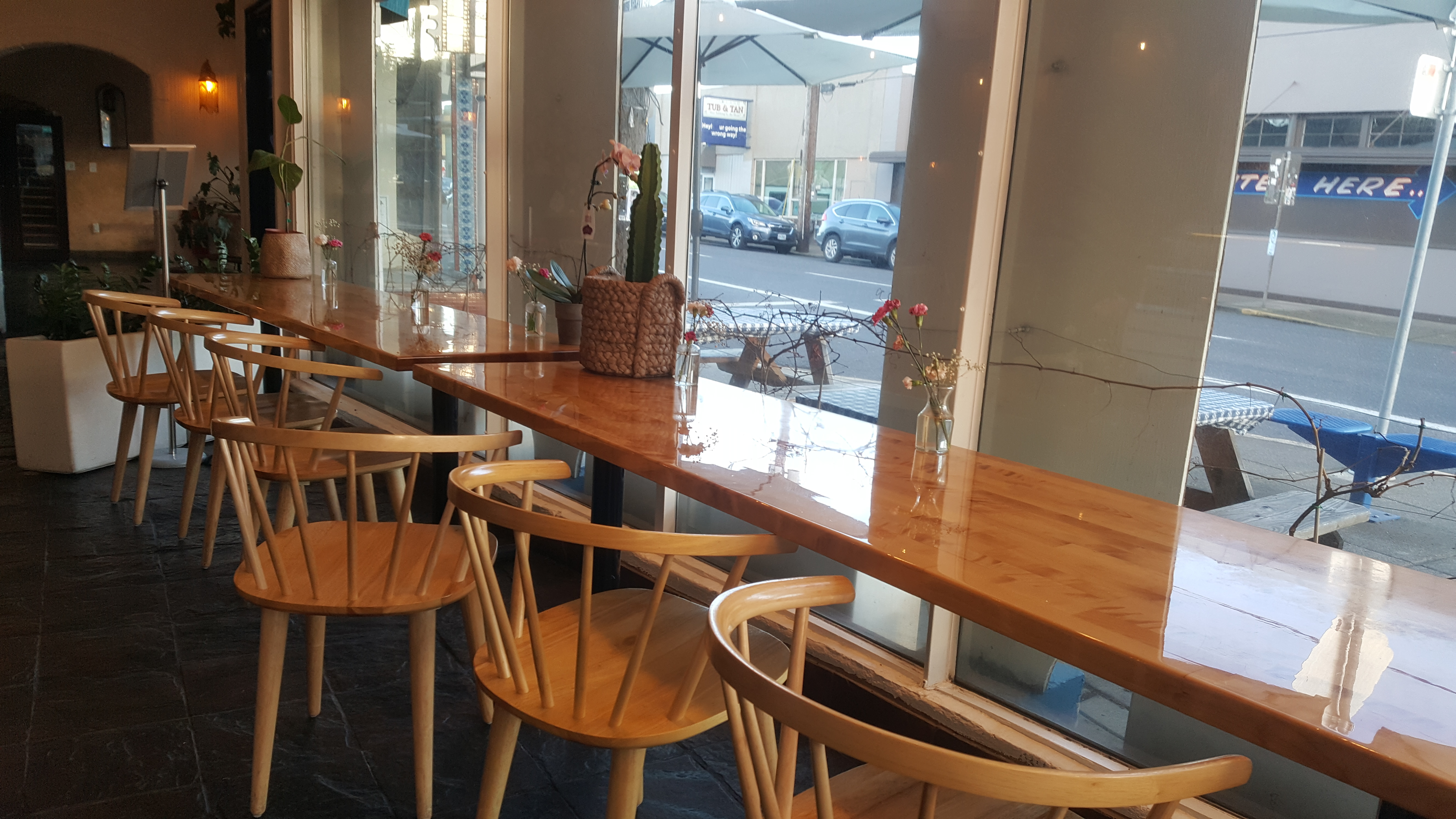
Indoor window seating, 2022

In 2003, The Oregonian called Ya Hala "a Lebanese restaurant also on the top of many critics' lists". The newspaper said in 2004:

Lots of Lebanese restaurants are family affairs, but few are so gracious and dear that the customers feel they've been adopted by the evening's end. That happens here. Host John Attar works the front, spinning funny stories about the history of dishes and waxing about how he feels Lebanese wines are underrated, while his wife, Mirna Attar, creates stunningly good food in the back. The combination is the perfect marriage of personality and great flavors.

In 2008, The Oregonian said, "Every neighborhood should be so lucky to have a family diner like this: loud and bustling, with well-priced, piled-high plates of Lebanese food and a Mideast grocery store next door. Best dishes are found in the meze and grill sections." Michael Russell included the restaurant in the newspaper's 2019 "ultimate guide to Portland's 40 best brunches". In Walking Portland (2019), Becky Ohlsen called Ya Hala "an excellent choice if you're hungry" and said the restaurant was among the first established along a section of Southeast Stark Street.

In 2015, Benjamin Tepler of Portland Monthly said Ya Hala was "widely considered one of the city's best Middle Eastern restaurants". Ya Hala was a runner-up in the Best Mediterranean Restaurant category of Willamette Week's annual 'Best of Portland' reader's poll in In 2016, 2017, and 2022. In the newspaper's 2019 list of the 10 "best places to get hummus in Portland", Shannon Gormley described the hummus as "a wholesome treat" with a "rich, nutty flavor and unobtrusive consistency". Alex Frane selected Ya Hala for Montavilla in Thrillist's 2019 list of the "best brunch spots in 17 Portland neighborhoods".

The restaurant has been included in multiple lists published by Eater Portland, including Chad Walsh's 2016 list of "Portland restaurants with killer delivery options", Nick Woo's 2020 overview of "where to find saucy shakshuka in Portland", and Lauren Carlos and Michelle DeVona's 2020 overview of "where to find next-level hummus in Portland". In the website's 2022 overview of recommended eateries in Montavilla, Alex Frane and Nathan Williams wrote: "A stucco wall painted with faux windows adds an immersive charm to Ya Hala, one of the city's best Lebanese restaurants. Most nights of the week, families and couples on dates fill its dining room, with tables covered in baba ghanoush, shawarma, lamb sausages, rice-stuffed grape leaves, and much more."

== See also ==
- List of Lebanese restaurants
- List of Middle Eastern restaurants
