= Habibi Restaurant =

Restaurant in Portland, Oregon, U.S.

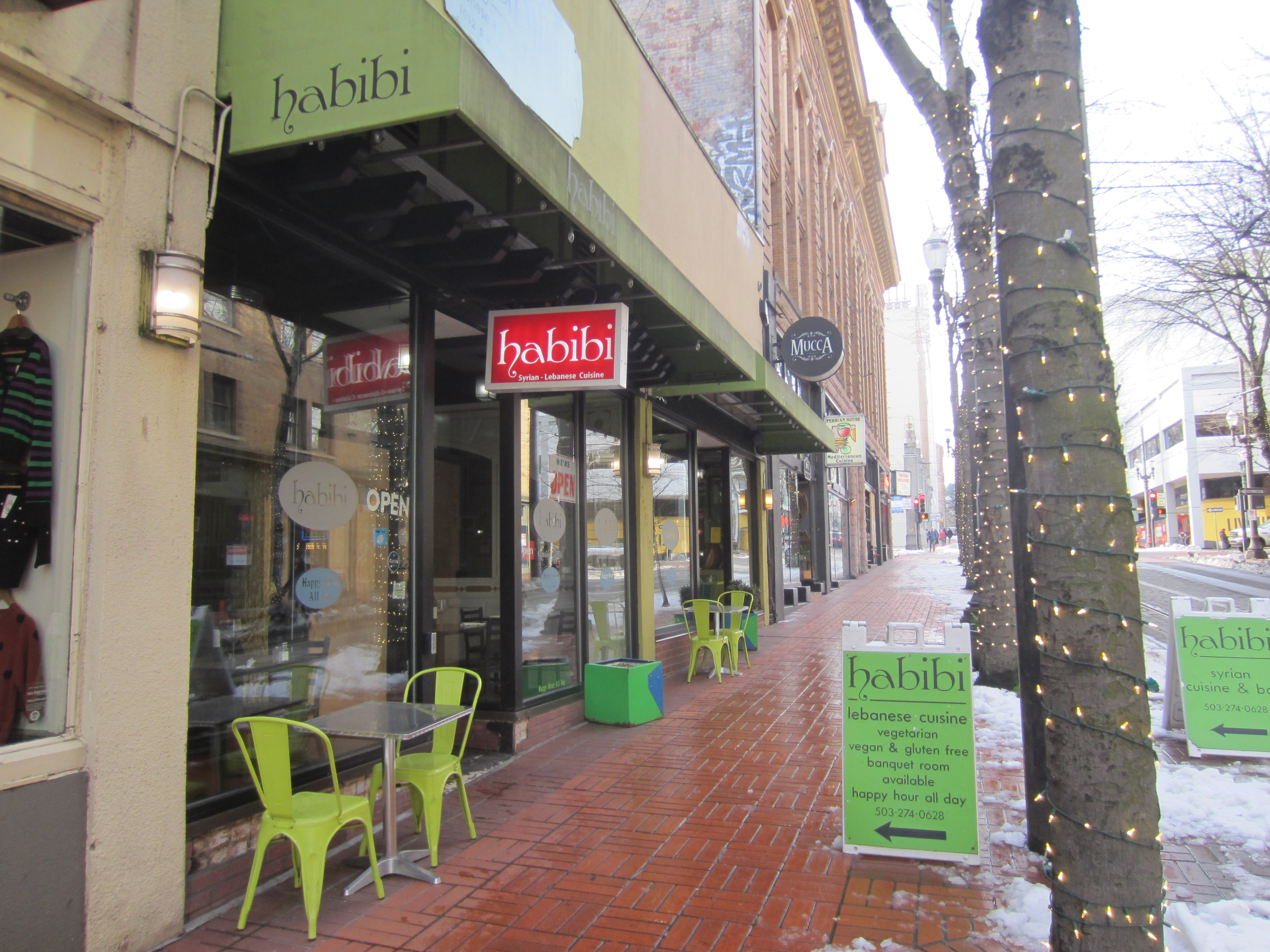
- The restaurant's front exterior in February 2021
- Interactive map of Habibi Restaurant

Restaurant information
- Owner: Mazen "Leo" Khoury
- Food type: Lebanese; Middle Eastern; Syrian
- Location: 1012 Southwest Morrison Street, Portland, Multnomah, Oregon, 97205, United States
- Coordinates: 45.5201°N 122.6826°W
- Website: habibirestaurantpdx.com

Habibi Restaurant is a Lebanese, Middle Eastern, and Syrian restaurant in Portland, Oregon.

== Description ==
Habibi Restaurant serves Lebanese, Middle Eastern, and Syrian cuisine including baba ghanoush, falafel, grape leaves stuffed with beef, hummus, meze, pita, shawarma, and tzatziki.

== History ==
Habibi had two locations, as of 2011: 1012 Southwest Morrison Street and 221 Southwest Pine Street. The Pine Street restaurant changed ownership in 2014.

The restaurant enrolled in Prime Now in 2015. During the COVID-19 pandemic, Habibi operated takeout service and via food delivery apps, as of May 2020.

In October 2020, owner Mazen "Leo" Khoury was stabbed by a customer who refused to pay.

== Reception ==
In 2007, The Oregonian's ethnic food guide said, "After one visit to this Lebanese diner, you're a friend; on the second, you're family. Straight-out-of-the-oven pita is perfect, the hummus contends for the city's best, and the Lebanese rice is amazing. Finish with a strong, tasty Turkish coffee or a rosewater juice." DeAnn Welker wrote:

It's easy for a restaurant to get lost on Southwest Morrison's restaurant row between 10th and 11th avenues, where Italian, Indian, Mexican and Mediterranean flavors cheerfully coexist. The real standout is Habibi, a Lebanese diner every bit as good as well-known eastside joint Nicholas, with a few touches --the fresh-from-the-oven pita paired with a contender for the city's best hummus among them --that go beyond, ensuring it lives up to its name ("habibi" means "beloved" in Lebanese). And it will be even more beloved when it commits to a full-time Lebanese focus and drops the holdover Italian dishes.

In 2011, The Oregonian's Michael Russell wrote, "This family-run restaurant features Syrian and Lebanese recipes that will make you forgive the nightclub lighting. Stop in for friendly service, tasty falafel and shawarma sandwiches, creamy hummus, and tender marinated kebabs served over flavorful rice." In her 2019 list of the city's ten best places to get hummus, Shannon Gormley of Willamette Week wrote, "If you like your hummus with a rougher texture that's still plenty creamy, Habibi is the place to go. The low-key glitzy Syrian Lebanese restaurant's blend is light and refreshing, the kind of dish that makes you feel healthier."

== See also ==
- List of Lebanese restaurants
- List of Middle Eastern restaurants
