= TarBoush (restaurant) =

Restaurant in Portland, Oregon, U.S.

TarBoush Lebanese Bistro and Bar
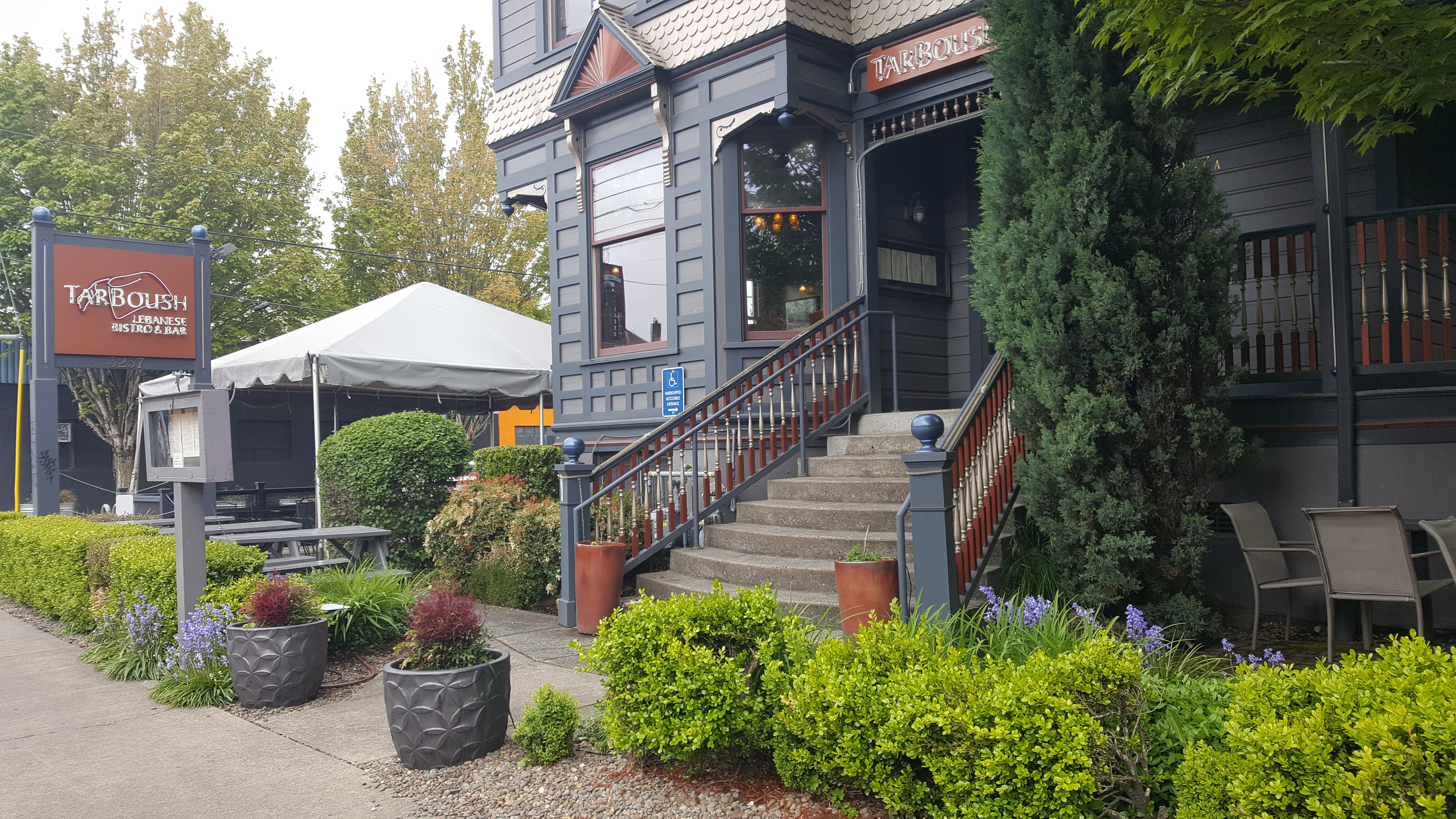
- The restaurant's exterior, 2022
- Interactive map of TarBoush Lebanese Bistro and Bar

Restaurant information
- Food type: Lebanese; Mediterranean
- Location: 3257 Southeast Hawthorne Boulevard, Portland, Oregon, 97214, United States
- Coordinates: 45°30′44.2″N 122°37′53.3″W

TarBoush Lebanese Bistro and Bar, or simply TarBoush, is a Lebanese restaurant in Portland, Oregon.

== Description ==
TarBoush is a Mediterranean restaurant on Hawthorne Boulevard in southeast Portland's Sunnyside neighborhood. Alex Frane of Willamette Week wrote, "Housed in a vintage Victorian home, the Lebanese restaurant TarBoush caters to diners of all diets, with a broad menu of vegan, vegetarian and omnivore Middle Eastern dishes." The menu includes shawarma (chicken, beef), lentil soup, rice pudding, kawaj (green peppers, eggplant, zucchini, potatoes, and onions on basmati rice), moussaka batinjan (eggplant, garlic, chickpeas), kibbeh, hummus, tabbouli, baba ghannoush, pita, and grape leaves. The exterior has neon signs.

== History ==
TarBoush opened in 2010. The restaurant announced plans to open a second location in the North Tabor neighborhood in 2014. The second restaurant closed in 2015, replaced by Big-Ass Sandwiches in June.

== Reception ==
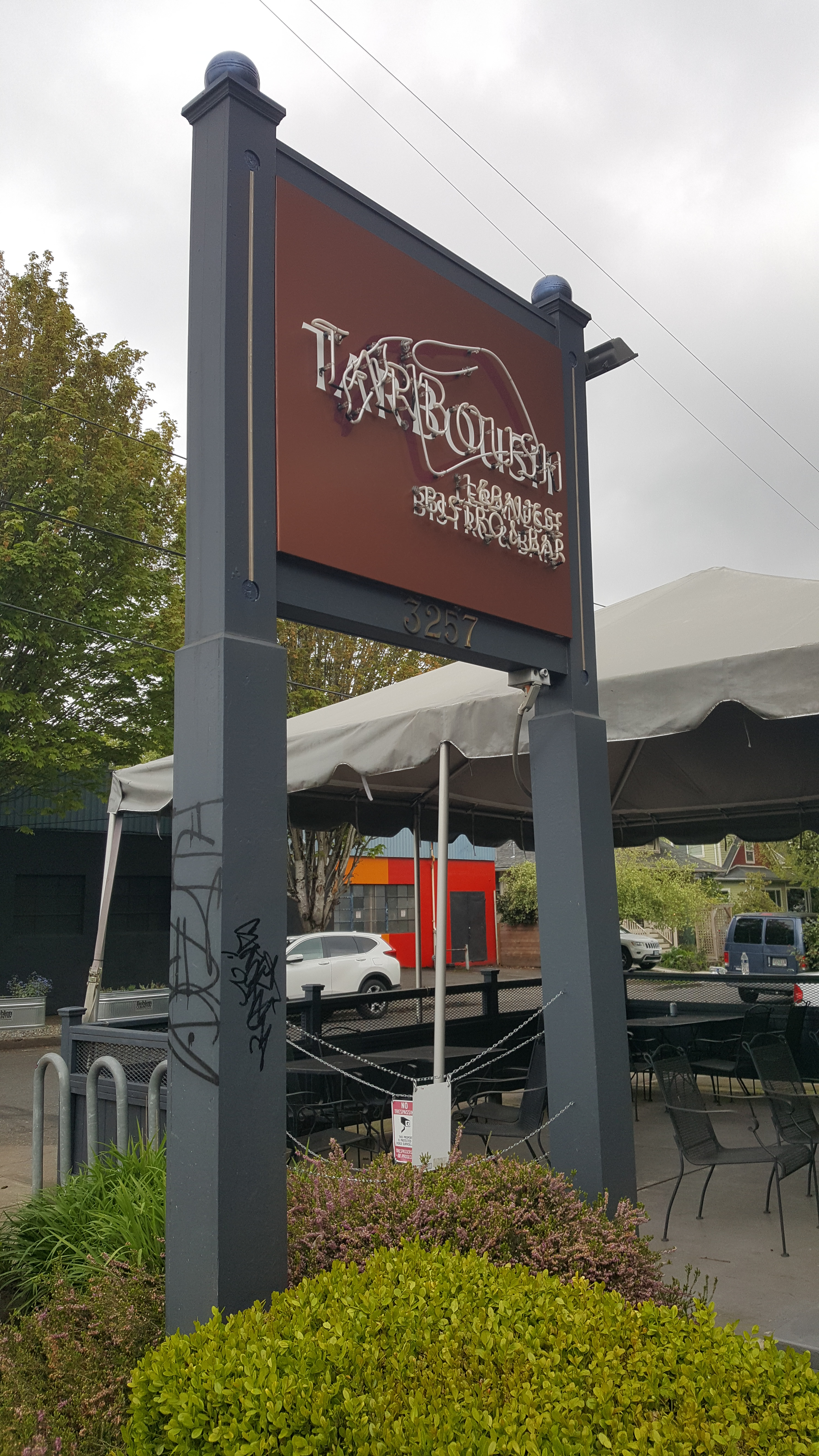
Exterior sign, 2022

Martin Cizmar of Willamette Week said in 2014, "Southeast Hawthorne's TarBoush does pita, and pretty much everything else, right. You'll get a lot more food at a lower price at Nicholas, sure, but if you're eye is on high quality, this is where you want to be." In 2015, Michael Russell of The Oregonian said, "if you're after ambiance, head to Nicholas, Ya Hala, Hoda's or another of Portland's many, many Lebanese restaurants. If all you care about is the food, head to Tarboush."

Willamette Week's AP Kryza wrote in 2015, "Part of the charm of TarBoush—arguably the best Lebanese restaurant in Portland—is how personal it feels. That explains why the short-lived North Tabor spin-off is now Big Ass Sandwiches: Half the joy of TarBoush is walking into the Victorian house-cum-restaurant and being blasted with a whoosh of Lebanese spices." The newspaper's Matthew Korfhage included TarBoush in a 2017 list of "The Best Restaurants on Hawthorne and Belmont in Southeast Portland", in which he wrote, "If you want soundly solid Middle Eastern fare, you want to be inside this old house on Hawthorne. Tarboush stands out in a crowded field by doing almost everything right—puffy pitas fresh out of the oven, smooth hummus, crisp and salady tabouli, juicy kufta. The only thing to avoid is the dry chicken." Brian Panganiban of Willamette Week said in 2018, "Tarboush may be a touch pricier than your average Lebanese restaurant, but it's oh so worth it for some of the best bamyeh okra stew in town." The newspaper also included the restaurant in a 2019 list of "The Top Five Restaurants for a Last-Minute Valentine's Day Dinner".

== See also ==
- List of Lebanese restaurants
