= List of Lebanese restaurants =

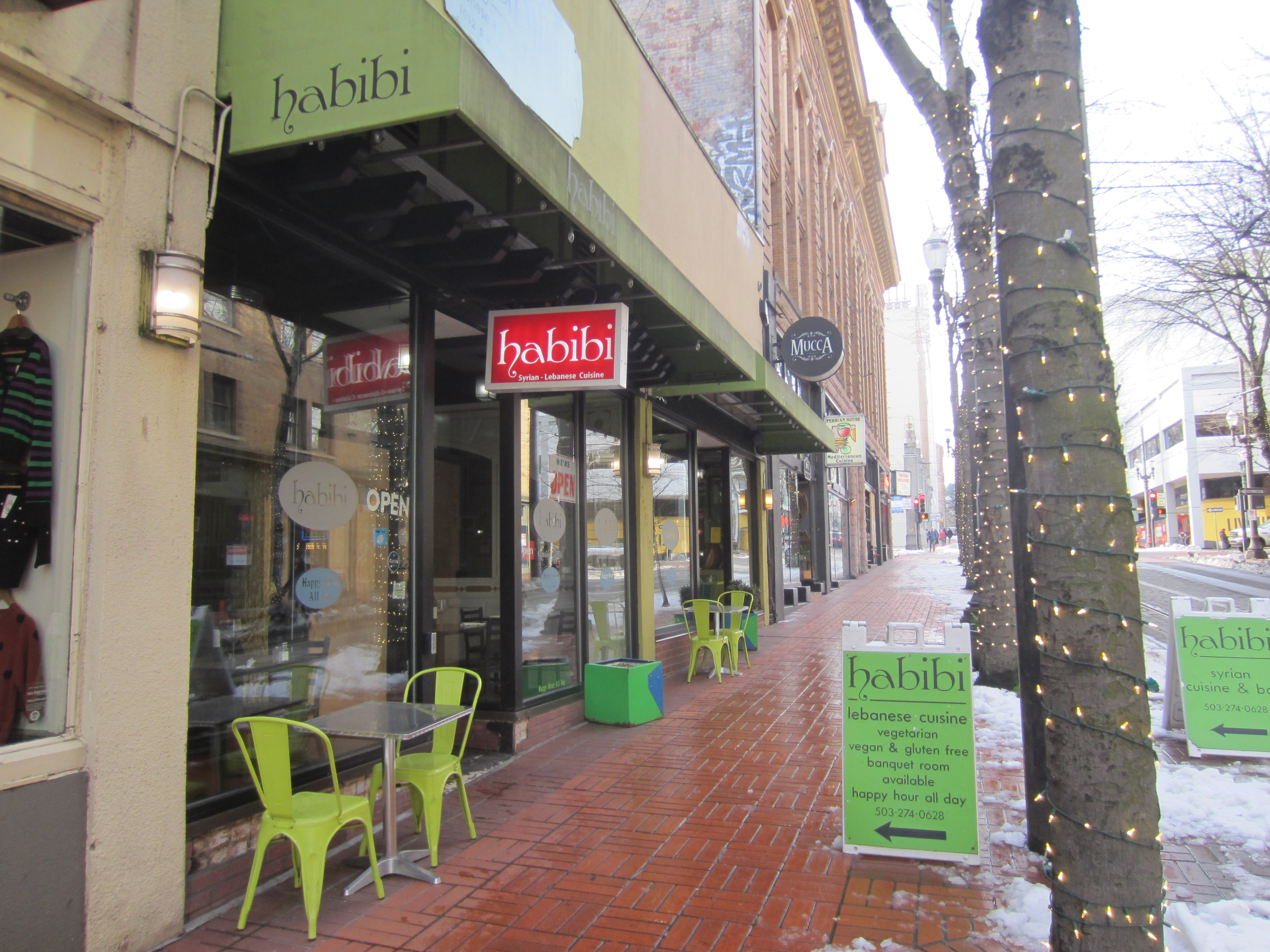
Habibi Restaurant, Portland, Oregon, U.S.

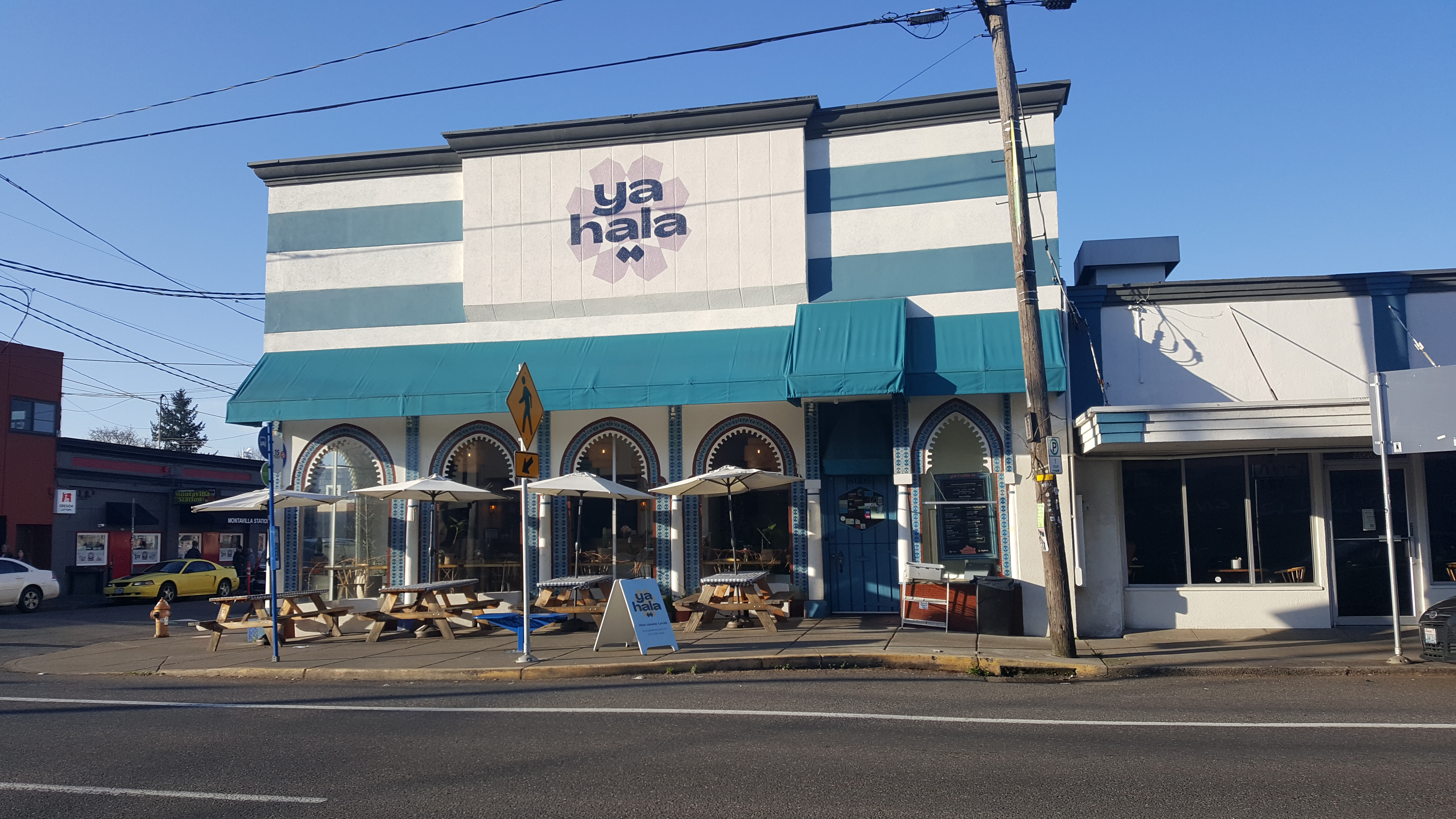
Ya Hala, Portland, Oregon, U.S.

Following is a list of Lebanese restaurants:

- Abou Karim, Portland, Oregon
- Aladdin's Eatery, Midwestern and Southeastern United States
- Arabesque Family Restaurant, Kitchener, Ontario, Canada
- Boustan, Monteal, Quebec
- Droubi's, Houston, Texas, U.S.
- Habibi Restaurant, Portland, Oregon, U.S.
- Hoda's, Portland, Oregon
- Lupe's Situ Tacos, Seattle
- Mamnoon, Seattle
- The Middle East
- Newport Restaurant, Cambridge, Massachusetts
- Nicholas Restaurant, Portland metropolitan area
- TarBoush, Portland, Oregon
- Ya Hala, Portland, Oregon
- Zankou Chicken, Los Angeles, California
