= Droubi =

Droubi or Al-Droubi is a surname. Notable people with the surname include:

- Aladdin al-Droubi (1870–1920), Syrian politician
- Bilal al-Droubi (died 2025), Syrian rebel commander
- Latifa al-Droubi (born 1984), First Lady of Syria
- Sami Droubi (1921–1976), Syrian politician, career diplomat, writer, translator, university professor, and philosopher

== See also ==
- Droubi's, Lebanese restaurant in Houston, Texas, U.S.
