= Lupe's Situ Tacos =

Restaurant in Seattle, Washington, U.S.

- Interactive map of Lupe's Situ Tacos

Restaurant information
- Chef: Lupe Flores
- Food type: Lebanese-Mexican (fusion)
- Location: Seattle, King, Washington, United States
- Coordinates: 47.6662°N 122.3833°W
- Website: situtacos.com

Lupe's Situ Tacos is a restaurant in Seattle's Ballard neighborhood, in the U.S. state of Washington. It serves Lebanese-Mexican fusion cuisine. Lupe Flores is the chef. The menu includes tacos, nachos, and guacamole.

In 2026, the restaurant was featured on the Food Network series Diners, Drive-Ins and Dives.

== See also ==
- List of Diners, Drive-Ins and Dives episodes
- List of Lebanese restaurants
- List of Mexican restaurants
