= Hoda's =

Restaurant in Portland, Oregon, U.S.

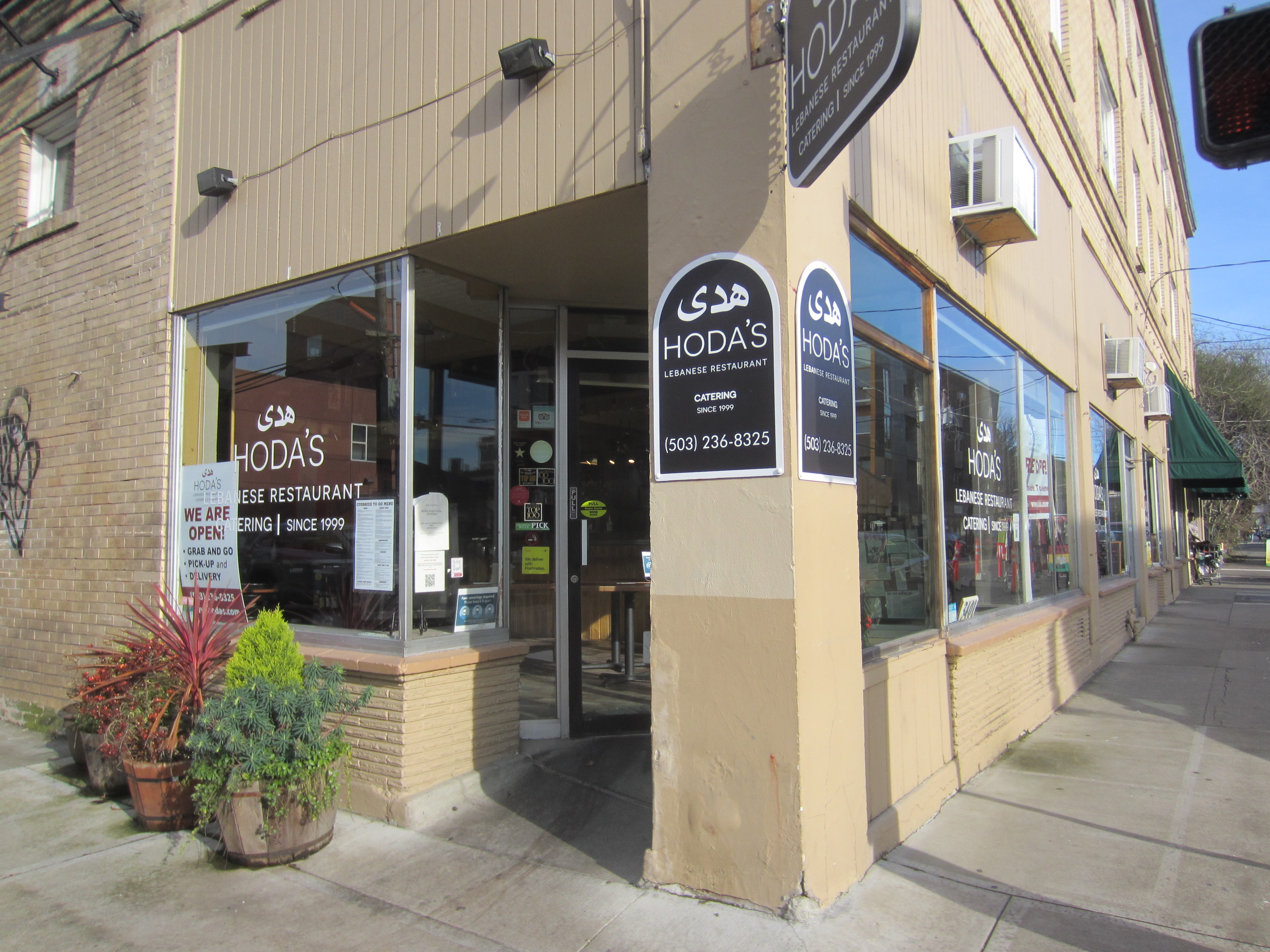
- The restaurant's exterior in 2021
- Interactive map of Hoda's

Restaurant information
- Food type: Lebanese; Middle Eastern
- Location: 3401 Southeast Belmont Street, Portland, Multnomah, Oregon, 97214, United States
- Coordinates: 45.5165°N 122.6294°W

Hoda's (sometimes Hoda's Lebanese Restaurant, Hoda's Middle Eastern Cuisine, or Hoda's Middle Eastern Restaurant) is a restaurant in Portland, Oregon.

== Description ==
Hoda's is a family-owned Lebanese restaurant and catering service on Belmont Street in southeast Portland's Sunnyside neighborhood. The menu includes shawarma, pizzas, spinach pies, breads, baba ghanoush, and hummus.

== History ==
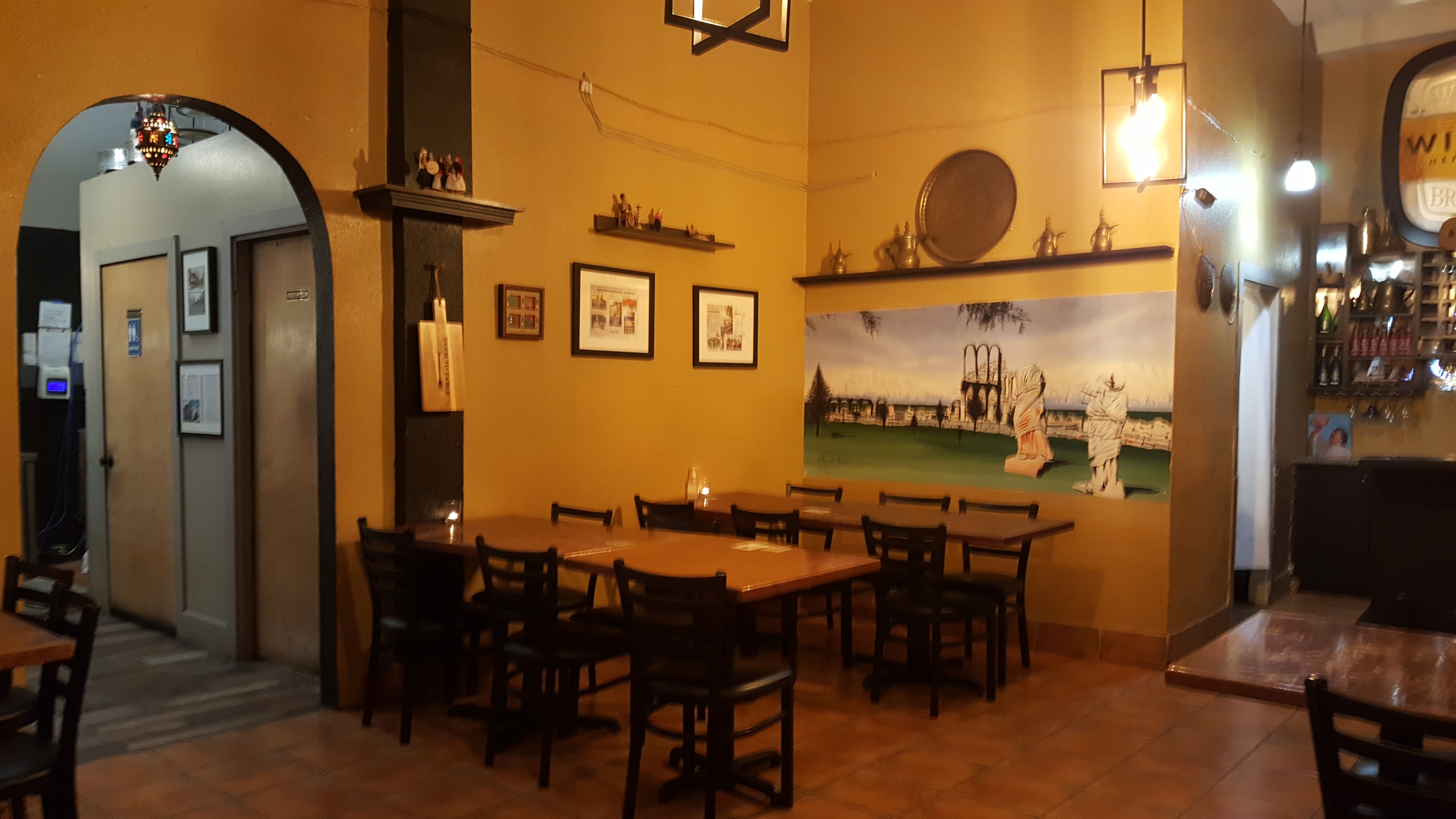
Interior of the original restaurant

The business is owned by spouses Hani and Hoda Khouri, who opened the original restaurant in 1999. The Khouris, who are Catholic, received "several menacing anti-Muslim/Arab" phone calls at the restaurant following the September 11 attacks (2001).

In 2010, Hoda's filed a liquor license application and secured a location for a second restaurant in northeast Portland. The second restaurant, called Hoda's Middle Eastern Cuisine, opened in early 2011 and closed in 2014.

In 2020, during the COVID-19 pandemic, Hoda's served family meals via takeout and delivery while the dining room was closed; the menu included Kabob dinners, sandwiches, and lamb legs. Hoda Khouri also supported closing Belmont to allow more outdoor seating during the pandemic.

== Reception ==
In 2015, Eater Portland's Danielle Centoni called Hoda's one of the city's best Lebanese restaurants.

== See also ==
- List of Lebanese restaurants
- List of Middle Eastern restaurants
