= Boustan =

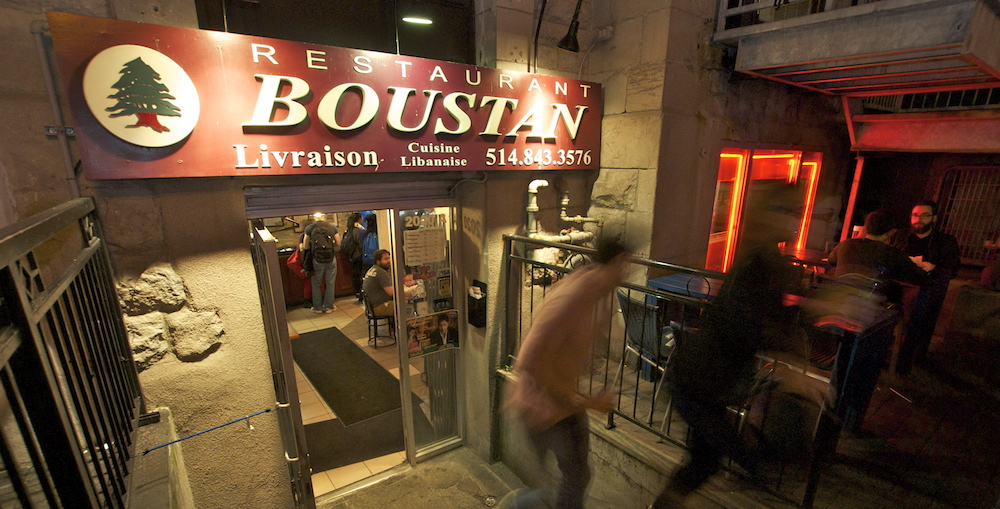
- Restaurant Boustan's original location at Crescent Street at De Maisonneuve Boulevard

- Location within Montreal

Restaurant information
- Established: 1986
- Food type: Lebanese
- Location: 2020A Crescent Street, Montreal, Quebec, H3G 2B8, Canada
- Coordinates: 45.498205°N 73.577825°W
- Website: boustan.ca

Boustan is a Lebanese-Canadian fast food restaurant chain in Montreal, Quebec. It was established in 1986. The name derives from the Persian word bōstān, meaning "garden", which has also been loaned into Arabic with the same meaning.

== History ==
Boustan was established in 1986 by Karim Saab, popularly known as "Mr. Boustan". Smaidi immigrated to Canada from Lebanon in the 1972, studied engineering at École Polytechnique de Montréal and worked for Philips before quitting to run Boustan full-time. It moved several times before settling in its final pre-franchise location, 2020A Crescent Street in downtown Montreal.

Boustan has been frequented by, among others, former Prime Minister of Canada Pierre Elliott Trudeau and some of the rosters from the Montreal Canadiens and Montreal Alouettes.

Smaidi put the restaurant up for sale in early 2011. He eventually sold the restaurant to George Hatzimargaritis and Mario Daigneault on March 25, 2012 for an undisclosed sum.

== Boustan chain ==
In 2014 Boustan opened a second location at 19 Ste Catherine East which serves the same menu as the original location.

In 2015 Boustan opened further locations in Anjou/Rivière-des-Prairies–Pointe-aux-Trembles (RDP) at 8000 Henri-Bourassa East and in Dollard-des-Ormeaux at 3980 boul St Jean which also serves the same menu as the original location.

In 2016 Boustan opened its fifth location in Laval, Quebec at 1601 Daniel Johnson corner St Martin.

In 2017 Boustan opened locations in Verdun, NDG, Rosemont, Côte-des-Neiges, Kirkland, St-Henri, Hochelaga-Maisonneuve, St Leonard and Blainville. In 2019 they opened a location in Vaudreuil-Dorion. In 2021, Boustan opened their first location outside the Greater Montreal area in Lévis. As of March 2022, a location in Ottawa on Rideau street and in Scarborough Ontario would be the first locations opened outside of Quebec bringing the franchises to a total of 41 locations. In 2023, a location in Oakville Ontario opened on Upper Middle Road in the Upper Oakville Shopping Centre.

== See also ==
- List of Lebanese restaurants
