= Aladdin's Eatery =

Chain of Lebanese restaurants in the USA

- Type: Private
- Industry: Restaurant
- Founded: 1994 in Lakewood, Ohio, US
- Headquarters: Lakewood, Ohio
- Number of locations: 30 (2019)
- Area served: Ohio, Indiana, Virginia, North Carolina, Pennsylvania
- Products: Lebanese cuisine
- Owner: Fady and Sally Chamoun
- Website: aladdins.com

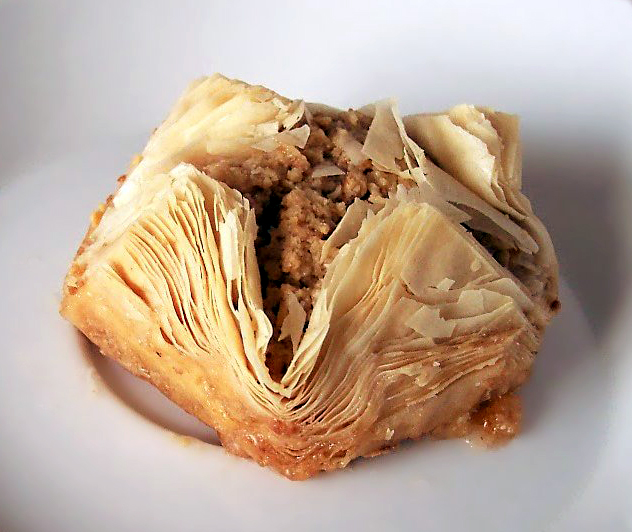
Baklava, a typical Middle Eastern cake served at Aladdin's Eatery

Aladdin's Eatery is a chain of franchised restaurants in the Midwestern United States and the Southeastern United States, specializing in Lebanese cuisine. Adapted to American tastes, the sites are fast casual restaurants that also offer take out.

The firm, Aladdin's Eatery Systems, Inc, is headquartered in Lakewood, a suburb of Cleveland, Ohio. Besides Ohio, the company also has locations in Indiana, Virginia, North Carolina, and Pennsylvania.

== History ==
Aladdin's Eatery was founded by Fady and Sally Chamoun in 1994. Since then it has become an extremely lucrative chain of restaurants. Fady Chamoun had arrived in the US from Lebanon in 1972 and worked at Little Caesars full-time while studying at the University of Michigan. Over the next twenty years he rose within Little Caesars, eventually running 40 franchises, which he sold, leaving him with $10,000 after repaying his debts, which he used to help fund a site in Lakewood, OH.

By 2004 the chain had 17 outlets and Chamoun won the Northeast Ohio Ernst & Young Retail Entrepreneur Of The Year award. Chamoun had established Jasmine's Bakery in Cleveland in 1997 to supply all his restaurants and by 2004 it was employing 40 people and making sales of $2 million.

In 2013 the chain was reported to have 30 sites in 5 US states.

== Reception ==
With a concept of "providing good food with a slightly exotic flavour and cheap prices" the chain is noted by reviewers for its assortment of soups, smoothies and juices, and options for vegetarians and meat lovers. Desserts such as traditional Lebanese baklava or pistachio cookies, which are supplied from Jasmine’s bakery, compete with more American gourmet cheesecakes.

== See also ==
- List of Lebanese restaurants
