= Crescent Street =

Thoroughfare in Montreal, Canada

- Crescent Street looking southward (2026)
- Interactive map of Crescent Street
- Native name: rue Crescent (French)
- Length: 0.6 km (0.37 mi)
- Location: Between Sherbrooke Street and René Lévesque Boulevard
- Coordinates: 45.497640°N 73.576646°W
- Major junctions: R-138

Construction
- Construction start: 1860s

Crescent Street (officially in French: rue Crescent) is a southbound street in downtown Montreal, Quebec, Canada. Running perpendicular to Saint Catherine Street, Crescent Street descends from Sherbrooke Street south to René Lévesque Boulevard.

Crescent Street is a popular attraction for both tourists and locals. North of De Maisonneuve Boulevard, there are many luxury boutiques and art galleries in a Victorian architectural setting. To the south of de Maisonneuve is a concentration of nightclubs, bars, and restaurants.

== History ==
The street, which opened around 1860, was originally in the form of a crescent, and was just north of Dorchester Boulevard.

The first bar on Crescent Street opened in 1967. Until then, the street had mainly professional offices. The first bar was the Sir Winston Churchill Pub, a pub partly owned by Johnny Vago, a Hungarian immigrant who once participated in the Cuban Revolution. Vago's discotheque, originally known as the Don Juan, was first on nearby Stanley Street. It relocated as a basement pub without a dance floor on Crescent after the basement of the Stanley Street building had to be re-engineered since parts of the Don Juan's dance floor had begun to fall into the Montreal Metro tunnel that was then being dug beside it.

A few months later, the basement of the adjoining Crescent Street building was opened up as the Boiler Room, a somewhat noisier pub, replete with large "quart" (22 oz.) bottles of beer, cheaper meals, a dance floor, and its jukebox, catering more to the local students and bohemian crowd, leaving the original Winston Churchill as a quieter pub for the older crowd. The two bars were served by a common kitchen.

Another key business on the street in the 1970s was Librairie L'Androgyne, the city's first LGBT-oriented bookstore.

A few years later (c. 1975), the Boiler Room was closed and redone by Vago as an extension to the Winston Churchill but keeping the Boiler Room's dance floor. A few years later, the Winston Churchill expanded upstairs to the first and then the 2nd floors of the building and eventually became a very large restaurant and bar complex occupying the whole building.

Vago eventually ended up owning many bars on the block, but he has since sold his businesses.

Given the success of the first establishment, other restaurants and bars would settle in the mid-1970s.

Crescent Street merchants formed the Crescent Street Merchants Association in 1998 to promote the street's businesses.

Since the early 2000s, the Crescent Street Merchants Association have organized activities related to the city's sports and entertainment events. The most popular event is the Grand Prix Festival, which takes place each year at the time of the Formula One Canadian Grand Prix in June.

== Features ==
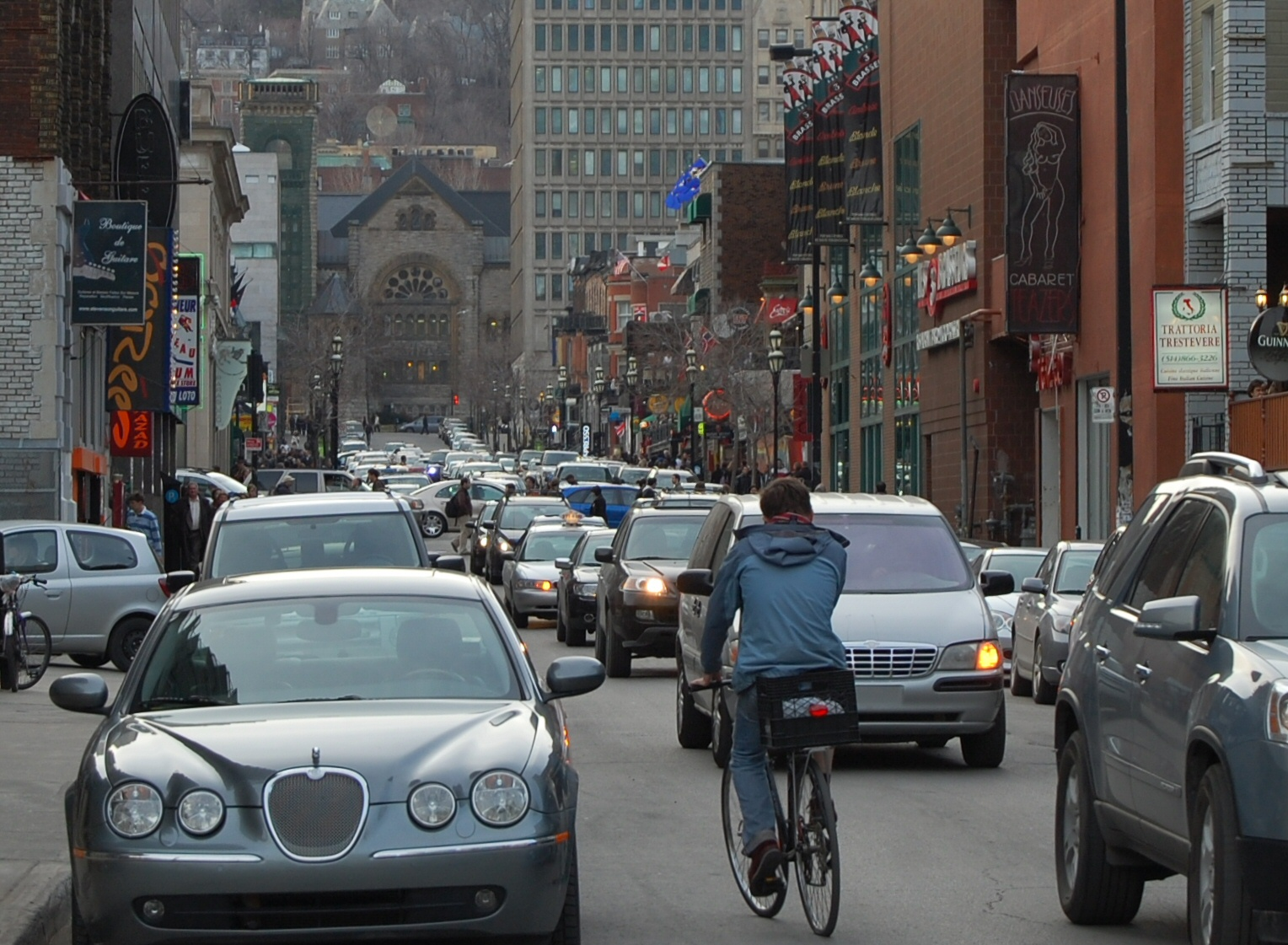
Looking northward on Crescent from south of Saint Catherine Street.

Crescent Street is home mostly to pubs, restaurants, and night clubs. One such business is the Lebanese restaurant Boustan, north of De Maisonneuve Boulevard. Crescent Street is known for its nightclubs that cater to both locals and tourists.

Crescent Street was also home to the Russian restaurant The Troika, which closed in April 2012 and has now replaced by the Brass Door Pub & Grill.

In 2017, a 21-storey-high commemorative mural of the late Montreal singer-songwriter Leonard Cohen was painted on the side of an apartment building on Crescent Street. Located slightly north of Saint Catherine Street, it is visible to traffic coming down the street and across a large area nearby.

== Grand Prix Festival ==
Crescent Street merchants hold an annual street fair, known as the Grand Prix Festival, the week prior to the Formula One Canadian Grand Prix. There are open-air free concerts, terraces for the bars into the streets, street vendors, and racing displays. The festival unofficially kicks off Montreal's festival season.

=== Toronto Raptors ===
In 2019, fresh off of hosting the Grand Prix Festival, Crescent Street played host to a massive watch party for the Toronto Raptors during the 2019 NBA Finals. It hosted a watch party for Game 6 of the Finals simultaneously with Peel Street, which also was fresh off of hosting the Grand Prix Festival and had previously hosted a watch party for the preceding game. The Raptors defeated the Golden State Warriors 114-110, to the delight of the thousands of people in attendance.

== Legacy ==
Hong Kong's most popular nightlife district, Lan Kwai Fong, was inspired by Montreal's Crescent Street. Allan Zeman, a businessman who grew up in Montreal, moved to Hong Kong for work opportunities. During that time, he glimpsed potential in the backstreets of Hong Kong’s Central neighbourhood, and turned Lan Kwai Fong into a nightlife and dining strip.
