= Arabesque Family Restaurant =

Lebanese restaurant in Kitchener, Canada

- Interactive map of Arabesque Family Restaurant

Restaurant information
- Owners: Mohamad Yanes; Mamoun Yanes; Bassam Chaban
- Food type: Palestinian Cuisine
- Location: Kitchener, Ontario, Canada
- Coordinates: 43.4630°N 80.4664°W
- Website: www.arabesquecafekw.com

Arabesque Family Restaurant, also known as Arabesque Café, is a Palestinian restaurant in Kitchener, Ontario, Canada, located at 869 Victoria St N.

== Menu ==
Arabesque is known for its hummus and freshly baked pita bread. Some appetizers include baba ghanoush, stuffed grape leaves, lentil soup, and kebbah. Meat entrees, such as chicken tekka, shawarma plates, or falafel, are served along dips, pita bread, salad, rice, and fries. All of the meats are halal. The restaurant also serves a number of Arabic sweets made daily, including baklava, nammoura, and kunafa. For drinks, non-alcoholic beer, juices, and smoothies are served. According to a 2013 Record article, the portions are large.

== History ==
The co-owners of Arabesque, Mohamad Yanes, Mamoun Yanes and Bassam Chaban, were born and raised in Syria with Palestinian descent. An engineer by trade, Yanes immigrated to Canada in 2009. The owners had little experience with restauranteering before opening Arabesque, and so "learned by doing".

The location of Arabesque was previously a fast food restaurant. In 2011, the restaurant opened a second location, Arabesque Express, for takeout only in Waterloo at 465 Phillip St; it later closed. In 2018, part of Victoria St. N was closed for construction, causing a significant decrease in Arabesque's business as customers needed to take a 15-minute detour.

Due to the 2020 COVID-19 lockdowns, the restaurant temporarily switched to being takeout and delivery only. As well the restaurant experienced a drop in business and laid off about fifty staff members. As part of the 2021 Canadian federal elections, NDP Leader Jagmeet Singh held a rally outside the restaurant.

== Reception ==
Dwight Storring of the Waterloo Region Record reviewed the restaurant in 2013, praising the food and atmosphere. Storring concluded by saying Arabesque "is restaurant that should be on everyone's list. The food is delicious, abundant and it caters to a wide range of palettes". In the Record's best of 2018 summary, Sandra Walneck recommended Arabesque's baba ghanoush appetizer "which makes any store-bought version pale by comparison". Writing for CBC News, Andrew Coppolino has recommended the restaurant a number of times, including on his 2017 local shawarma list, his 2021 halal recommendations, and a 2022 article about the Region's food. According to a 2018 Record article, the restaurant has a "loyal following".
