= Droubi's =

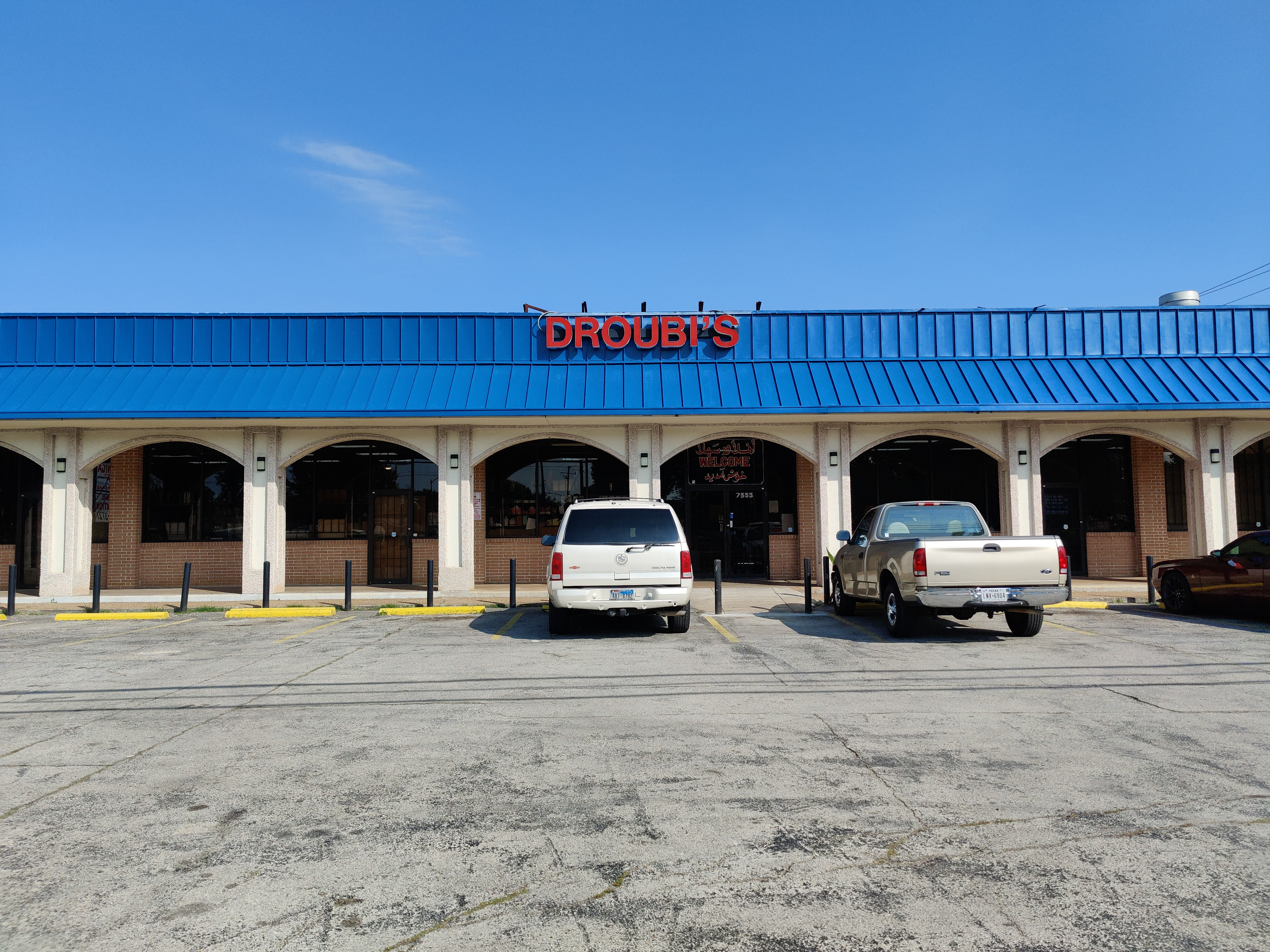
- Interactive map of Droubi's

Restaurant information
- Established: 1979
- Food type: Lebanese, Middle Eastern
- Location: 7333 Hillcroft Street, Houston, Texas, US, 77081
- Coordinates: 29°41′55″N 95°29′33″W

Droubi's is a historic Lebanese / Middle Eastern restaurant in Houston, Texas that opened in 1979. It has been cited by other local chefs as a source of inspiration, as well as cited by other chefs in lists of favorite restaurants and dishes.

== See also ==
- List of Lebanese restaurants
- List of Middle Eastern restaurants
