= Nicholas Restaurant =

Chain of restaurants in Portland, Oregon, U.S.

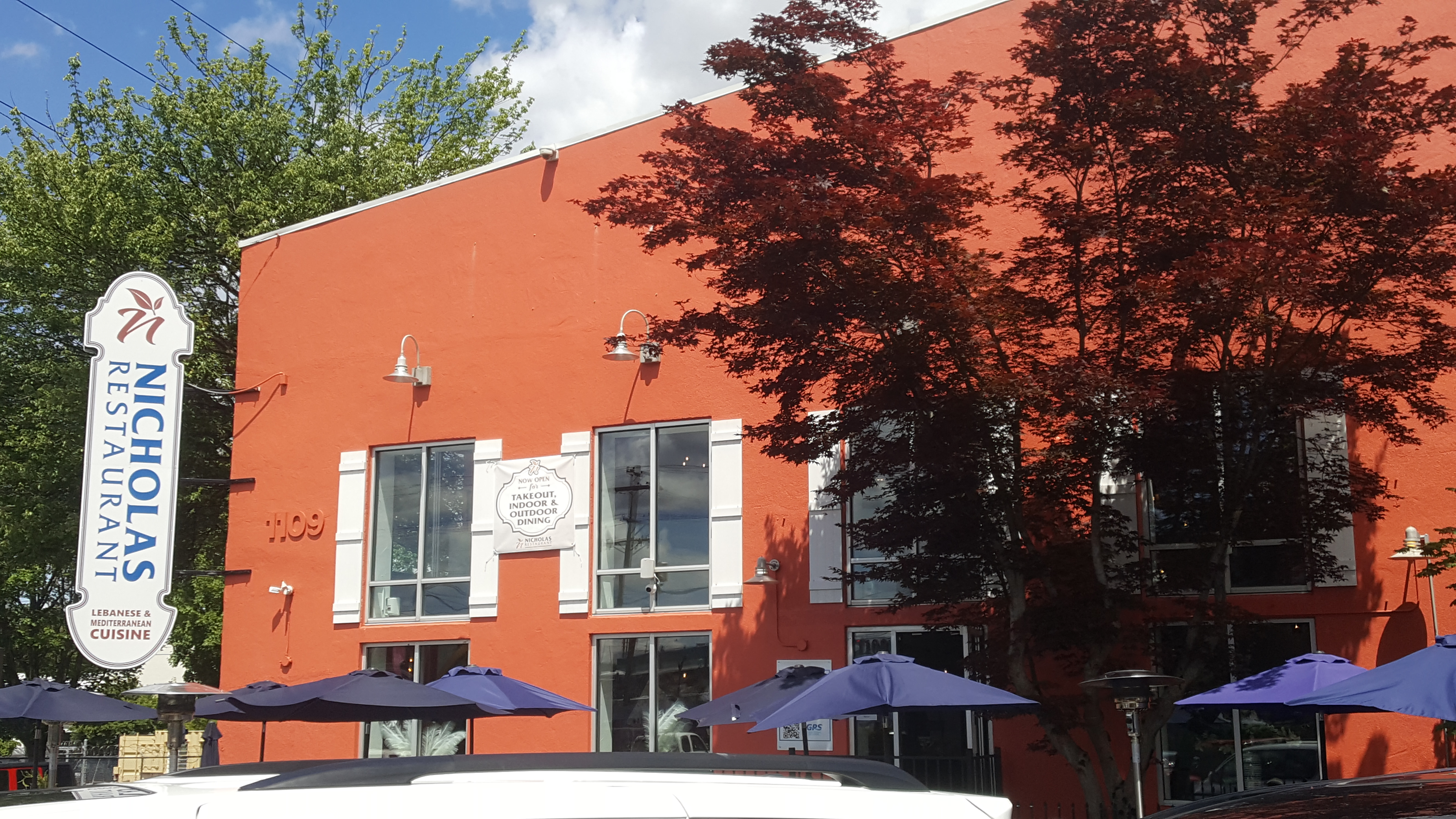
- Exterior of the Southeast Madison restaurant, 2021

Restaurant information
- Established: 1987
- Owner: Hilda Dibe
- Previous owners: Nicholas Dibe, Linda Dibe
- Food type: Lebanese
- Website: nicholasrestaurant.com

Nicholas Restaurant is a chain of three Lebanese restaurants in the Portland metropolitan area, in the United States. It is one of the oldest Lebanese and Middle Eastern restaurants in Portland. The business also operates in Gresham.

== History ==
Nicholas and Linda Dibe opened the first restaurant in 1987. The Dibes fled Beirut, Lebanon in 1982, immigrated to Portland with their four young daughters. Five years later they opened the restaurant. Nicholas invested his entire pension in the restaurant, which first served pizza and calzones. Later, the Dibes started adding some of their favorite Lebanese dishes to the menu, which became popular with customers. The restaurant is now owned by one of the Dibes' daughters, Hilda. There are several locations which are operated by different extended family members. The business also operates in Gresham.

In 2020, Nicholas announced plans to relocate the flagship location to 1109 Southeast Madison Street, in the Buckman neighborhood, in 2021. In April 2021, Nicholas opened its new location which has a full bar.

== Reception ==
Willamette Week's Lauren Yoshiko said Nicholas is best for "homestyle hummus and kebabs, every day for decades" and wrote, "If Pioneer Place is Portland's living room, Nicholas is the city's Lebanese kitchen." Nicholas has been recognized in the newspaper's annual 'Best of Portland' readers' poll, winning in the Best Mediterranean Restaurant category in 2016, 2017, 2018, 2020, 2022, and 2024.

== See also ==
- List of Lebanese restaurants
- List of restaurant chains in the United States
