= Baba ghanoush =

Levantine dish of cooked eggplant

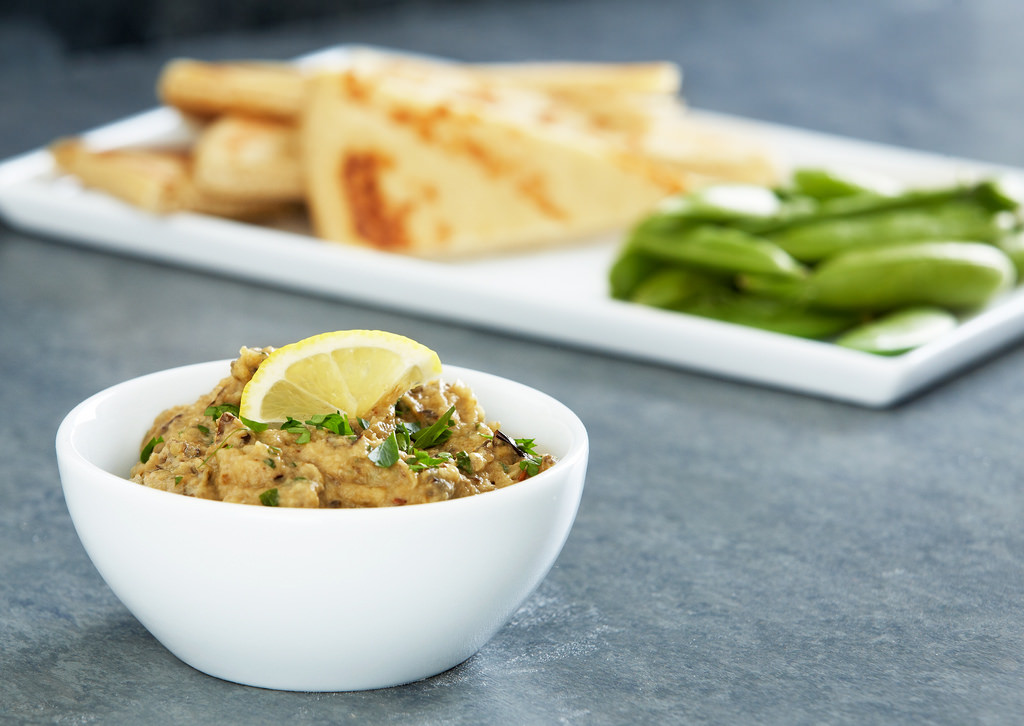
- Alternative names: Baba ganoush, baba ghanouj
- Course: Appetizer
- Place of origin: Levant
- Associated cuisine: Iraq, Armenia, Syria, Jordan, Israel, Lebanon, Palestine, Greece, Egypt, Tunisia, and Turkey
- Main ingredients: Eggplant, olive oil

Mutabbal
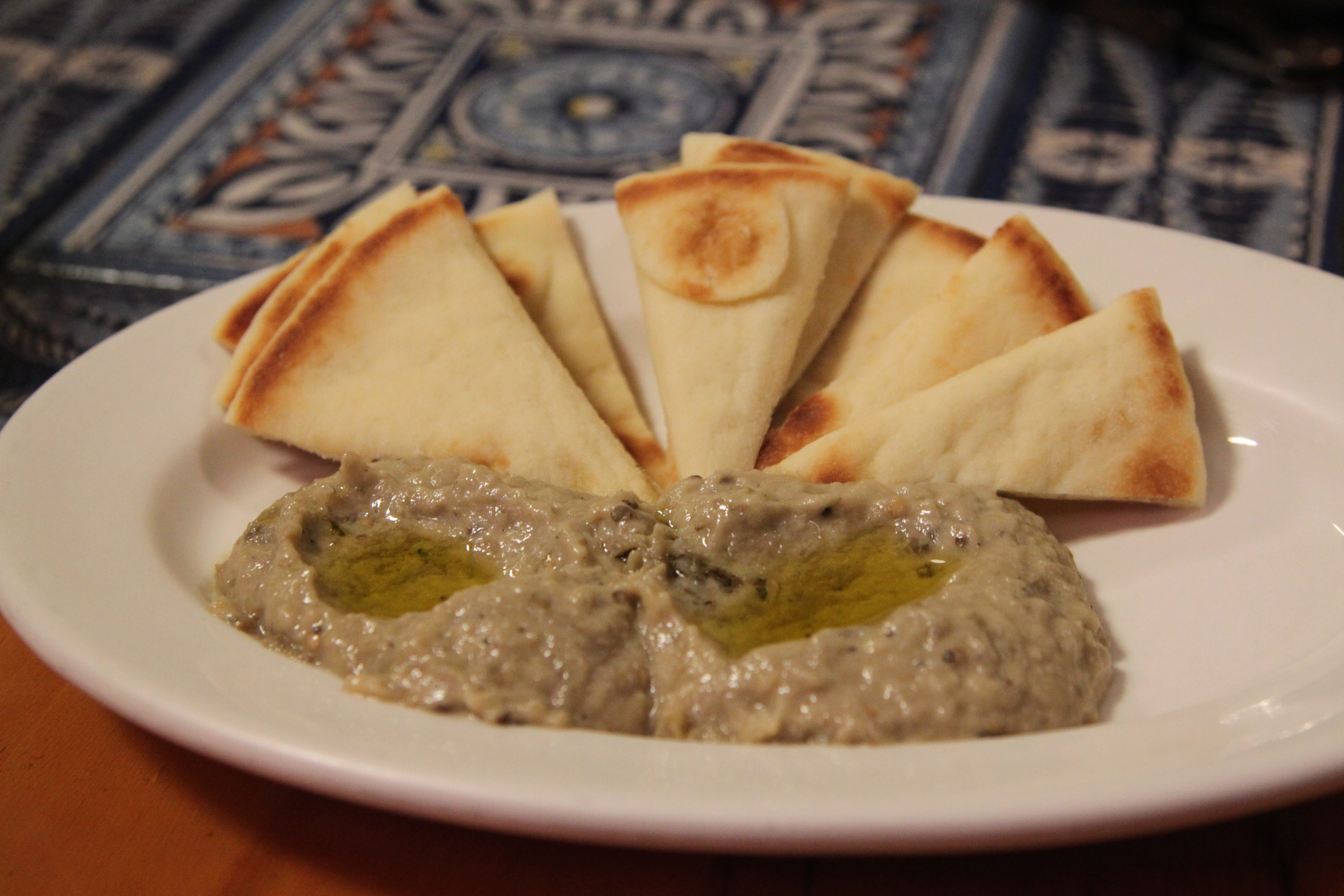
- Mutabbal and pita bread
- Alternative names: Moutabbal, m'tabbal
- Course: Appetizer
- Place of origin: Levant
- Main ingredients: Eggplant, olive oil

Baba ghanoush (/ˌbɑːbə ɡəˈnuːʃ/ BAH-bə gə-NOOSH, UK also /- ɡæˈnuːʃ/ - gan-OOSH, US also /- ɡəˈnuːʒ/ - gə-NOOZH; Arabic: بابا غنّوج, romanized: bābā ġannūj), also spelled baba ganoush or baba ghanouj, is a Levantine appetizer consisting of finely chopped roasted eggplant (aubergine), olive oil, lemon juice, various seasonings, and tahini. The eggplant is traditionally roasted, baked or broiled over an open flame before peeling so that the pulp is soft and has a smoky taste. It is a typical meze (starter) of the regional cuisine, often served as a side to a main meal and as a dip for pita bread.

== Etymology ==
The word bābā in Arabic is a term of endearment for 'father', while Ġannūj could be a personal name. The word combination is also interpreted as 'father of coquetry' or 'indulged/pampered/flirtatious daddy' or 'spoiled old daddy'. However, it is not certain whether the word bābā refers to an actual person indulged by the dish or to the eggplant (bāḏinjān or bātinjān in Arabic).

Hans Wehr's 4th edition of A Dictionary of Modern Written Arabic, released in 1979, described bābā ghanūj and abū ghanūj as "dish of mashed eggplants, sesame oil, etc.", attributing the term to Syrian and Lebanese Arabic.

== Varieties ==
Dishes consisting of mashed eggplant are common in cuisines from West Africa to Russia.

Eastern Arabian cuisine versions of the dish vary slightly from those of the Levant by spicing it with coriander and cumin; those versions might be minimally spiced and topped with thinly chopped parsley or coriander leaves (cilantro).

In Syria, the dish is often mixed with sheep cheese, making it creamier.

In Turkey, the dish is known as babaganuş or abugannuş. While the ingredients vary from region to region, the essentials (eggplants, tahini, garlic, lemon) are generally the same.

The dish became part of Israeli cuisine during the 1949-1959 period of austerity in Israel when it was adopted from the cuisines of neighboring Arab countries. It was used as a meat substitute and remained popular after the economic crisis ended. It was commonly used for snacks or to serve to unexpected guests, eventually becoming a "cultural icon," according to food writer and historian Gil Marks.

== Similar dishes ==
A very similar dish is mutabbal (Arabic: متبل, lit. 'spiced'); mutabbal is sometimes referred to as baba ghanouj. "Mutabbal" however, refers to a dish made with mashed, grilled vegetables and tahini, whereas baba ghanouj does not necessarily have tahini. Levantine mutabbal is made with many vegetables besides aubergines. In Palestine and Jordan, pumpkin mutabbal is a popular traditional dish.

In Romania, a similar dish is known as salată de vinete ('eggplant salad'). Like the Greek dish of Melitzanosalata, it lacks tahini and is made from finely chopped roasted eggplant, finely chopped onions, sunflower oil (explicitly not olive oil because it would make the dish bitter), salt and, optionally, mayonnaise.

in Greece, a similar dish is known as Μελιτζανοσαλάτα (melitzanosalata; literally translating to eggplant salad). However, the dish does not contain tahini, instead just containing the eggplant itself (hence the name), some olive oil and lemon juice, and may be flavoured with garlic, onion, and occasionally pepper flakes. The dish is extremely popular during the 40-day Lenten fast as it provides a non-animal-based alternative to dips like tzatziki during the fast. This is due to Greece being a very religious Orthodox Christian country.

== See also ==
- List of dips
- Eggplant salads and appetizers, an overview of similar dishes prepared around the world
- List of Arab salads
- List of eggplant dishes
- List of hors d'oeuvre
- List of Middle Eastern dishes

== Bibliography ==
- David, Elizabeth (1980). A Book of Mediterranean Food. Alfred A. Knopf. ISBN 0-394-49153-X.
- Levy, F. (2003). Feast from the Mideast. Harper Collins. ISBN 0-06-009361-7.
- Trépanier, Nicolas (30 November 2014). Foodways and Daily Life in Medieval Anatolia: A New Social History. University of Texas Press. ISBN 978-0-292-75929-9.
