= Manakish =

Levantine flatbread dish

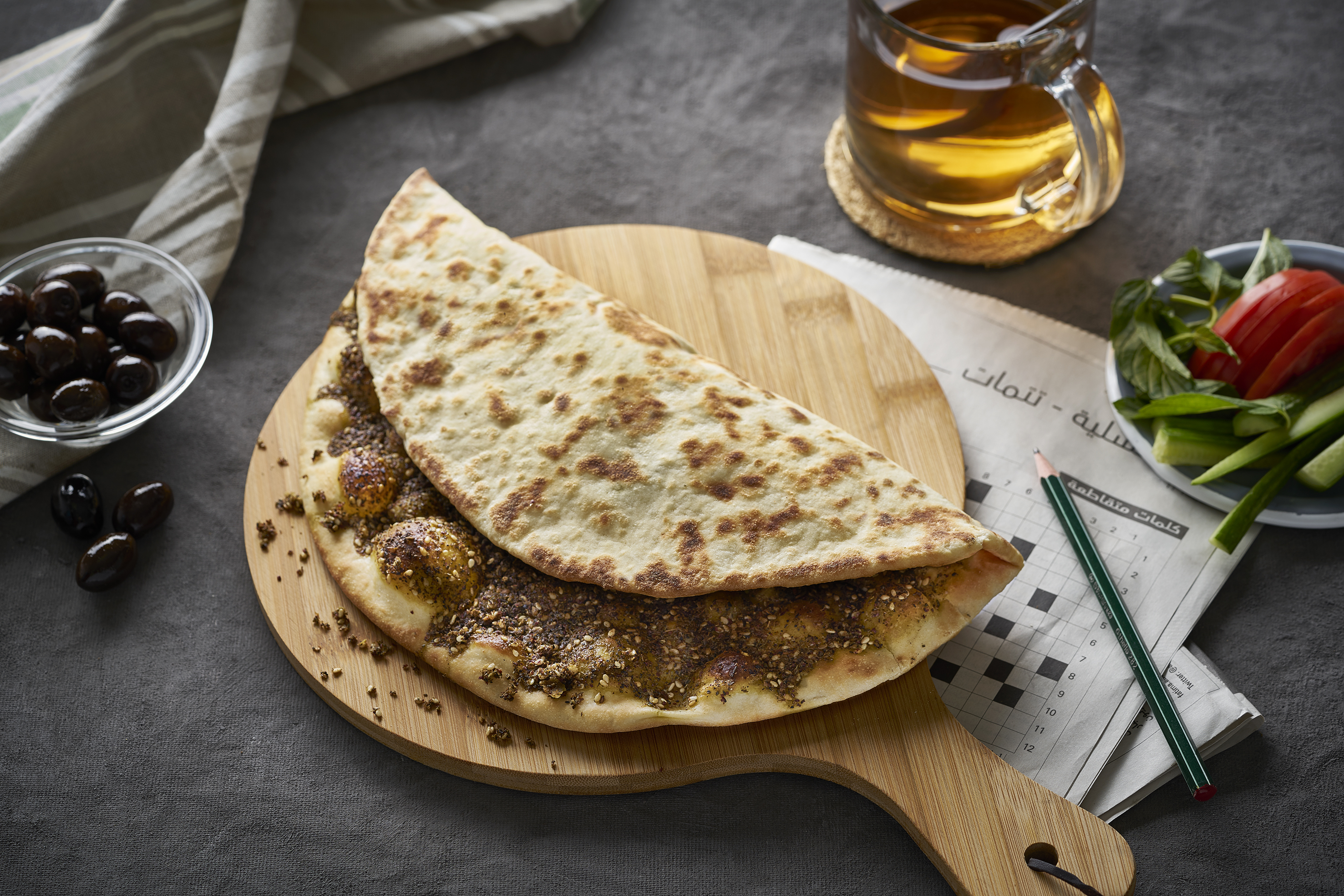
- Manakish made with za'atar with vegetables on the side
- Alternative names: Manaqish, manaeesh, manakeesh (plural) manooshe, man'ousheh, mankousheh (singular)
- Type: Flatbread
- Course: Breakfast or lunch
- Place of origin: Levant
- Region or state: Syria, Lebanon, Jordan, Palestine
- Associated cuisine: Levantine
- Main ingredients: Dough, za'atar, cheese or ground meat

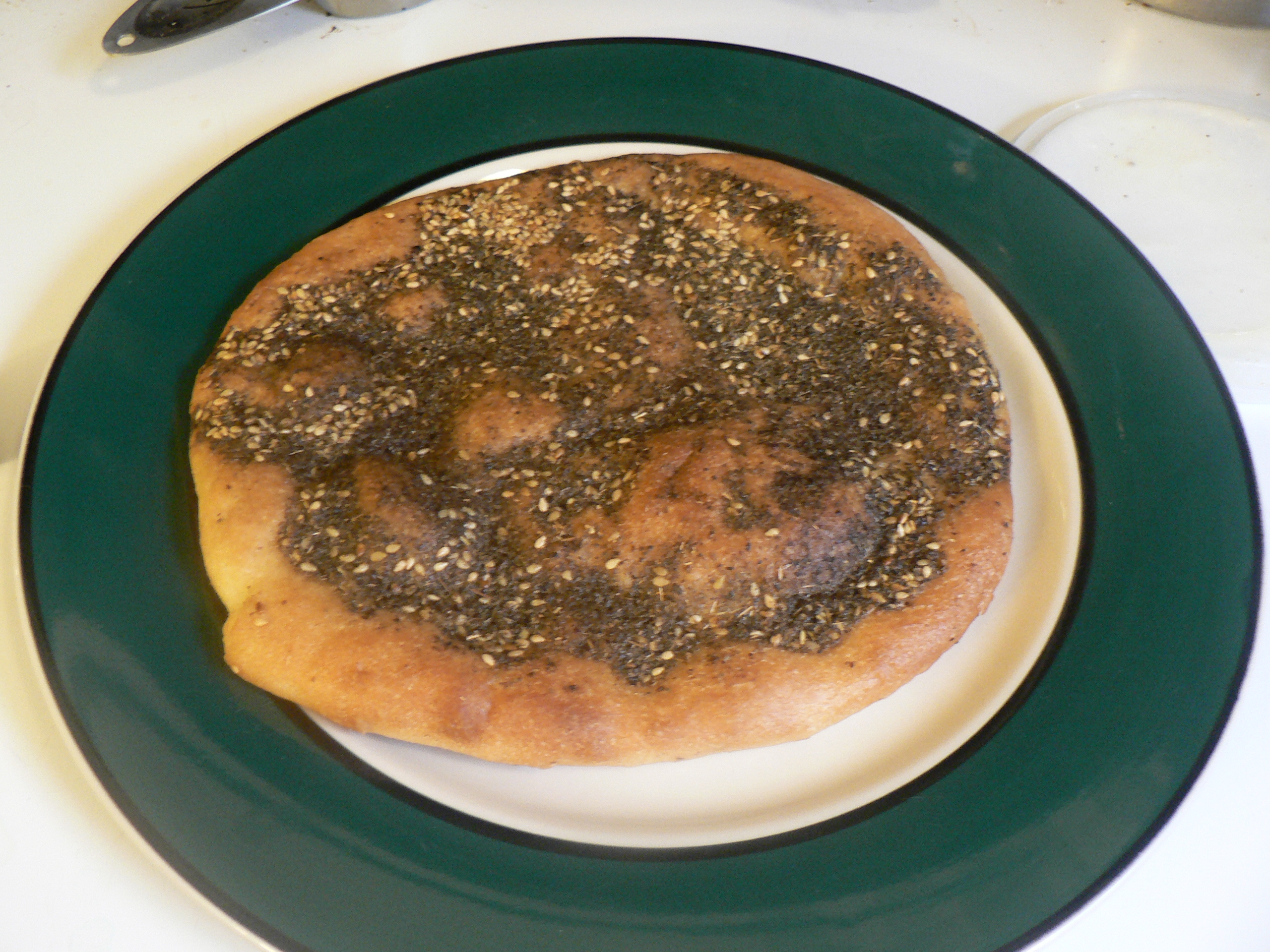
Za'atar bread

Manakish (Levantine Arabic: مناقيش, romanized: manāʾīš), singular man'ousheh (منقوشة, manʾūše) is a popular Levantine pastry, consisting of dough topped with za'atar (مناقيش بالزعتر, manāʾīš biz-zaʿtar), cheese (مناقيش بالجبنة, manāʾīš bil-jibne), or ground meat. It can be sliced or folded, and it can be served either for breakfast or lunch.

Traditionally, women would bake dough in a communal oven in the morning to meet their family's daily bread needs, and would prepare smaller portions of dough with different toppings for breakfast at this time. Saj and taboon are also common traditional cooking instruments for manakish.

Manakish are popular across the Levant, and can also be found in neighboring regions, and centers of Levantine emigration.

In 2023, manakish was inscribed to the UNESCO Intangible Cultural Heritage Lists as an emblematic culinary practice in Lebanon.

== Etymology ==
In standard Arabic, the word manāqīš is the plural of the word manqūšah, from the root verb naqaša (نقش), 'to sculpt, 'to carve out' or 'to engrave'; meaning that after the dough has been rolled flat, it is pressed by the fingertips to create little dips for the topping to lie in. Syrian historian Khayr al-Din al-Asadi associated the word manaqish with Beirut. The 'q' (qāf, ق) in manaqish is pronounced as a glottal stop by some speakers of Levantine Arabic, which is sometimes reflected in English as mana'ish.

== History ==
According to food historian Gil Marks, topped flatbreads like manakish and lahmacun became common in the Levant following the popularization of "baker's ovens" (furn) where the dough is placed on a heated floor rather than being baked vertically like a tannur.

German Orientalist Gustaf Dalman described manakish in his 1936 Arbeit und Sitte in Palaestina ("Work and Customs in Palestine") as leavened or unleavened dough coated in oil and oregano which is baked in a tabun oven.

== Classic toppings ==
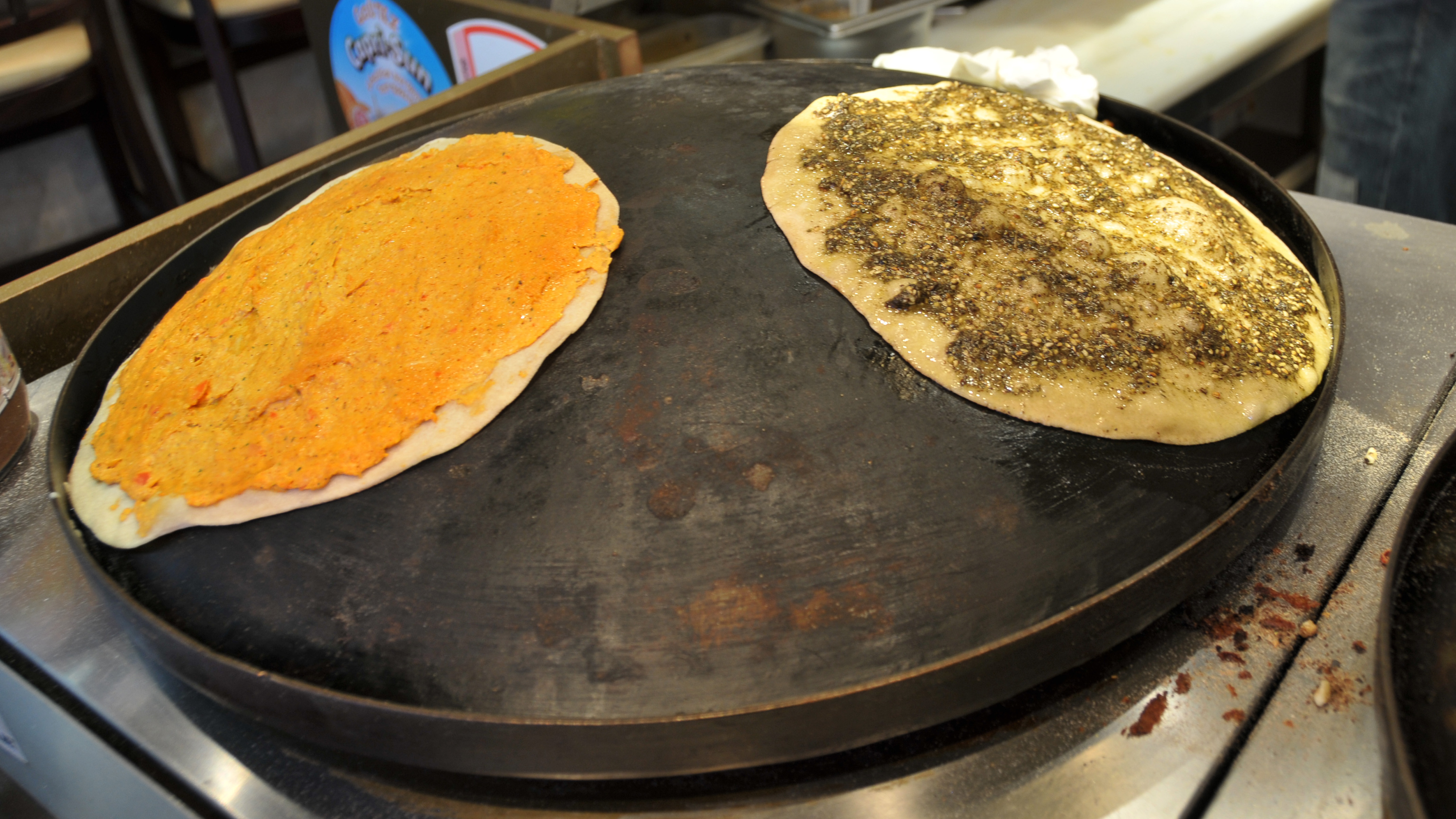
Lebanese manaqish being cooked on a saj

- Za'atar (زَعْتَر, zaʿtar, 'thyme'). The most popular form of manakish uses za'atar (ground dried thyme, oregano, marjoram or some combination thereof, mixed with toasted sesame seeds, salt, and other spices such as sumac) as a topping. The za'atar is mixed with olive oil and spread onto the dough before being baked in the oven. Za'atar manakish is a breakfast favorite in Levantine cuisine. It is also served as part of a mezze, or as a snack with a glass of mint tea and feta cheese on the side.
- Cheese (جُبْنَة, jibne). popular types of cheese used on manakish include: akkawi (عَكَّاوي, ʿakkawī) and kashkaval (قَشْقَوَان, ʾašʾawān). Za'atar is occasionally added to cheese manakish to enhance its flavor.
- Lahmacun (لحم بعجين, laḥm bi-ʿajīn, 'meat with dough'), also called sfiha (صفيحة, ṣfīḥa). Manakish topped with minced lamb are served for lunch due to their heavier contents. The minced lamb is mixed with tiny pieces of diced tomato and oil, and the manakish is optionally served with ground pepper or pickles and yogurt.
- Chili (فليفلة, fulayfila, or فلفل حر, filfil ḥarr), or shatta sauce and onions, popular in the Gaza Strip.
- Kashk (كشك). This is a mixture of fermented drained or dried yogurt and finely ground wheat that can be used by itself or in combination with other toppings, such as walnuts or onions, spread onto the bread.
- Spinach (سبانخ, sbāniḫ), chard (سلق, silq).
- Eggs: Sometimes the bread has a ridge to prevent spilling, sometimes combined with cheese; this may be called ikras beid or kras beid (اقراص بيض, iʾrāṣ bēḍ, 'egg discs') in Jerusalem, where sujuk is a common traditional topping for egg manaqish. Qawarma (lamb meat preserved in tail fat) is a traditional topping for Lebanese egg manaqish.
- Duqqa - Common in the Gaza strip, its popularity is attributed to its low cost.

== See also ==
- Feteer meshaltet
- Focaccia
- Khachapuri
- Lahmacun
- Musakhan
- Matnakash, a flat bread from Armenia. While the word may be related to manakish, matnakash is plain (no topping).
- Pita
- Pizza
- Iranian pizza
- Quesadilla
- Al-Maltout
