= Sfiha =

Flatbread topped with mutton mince

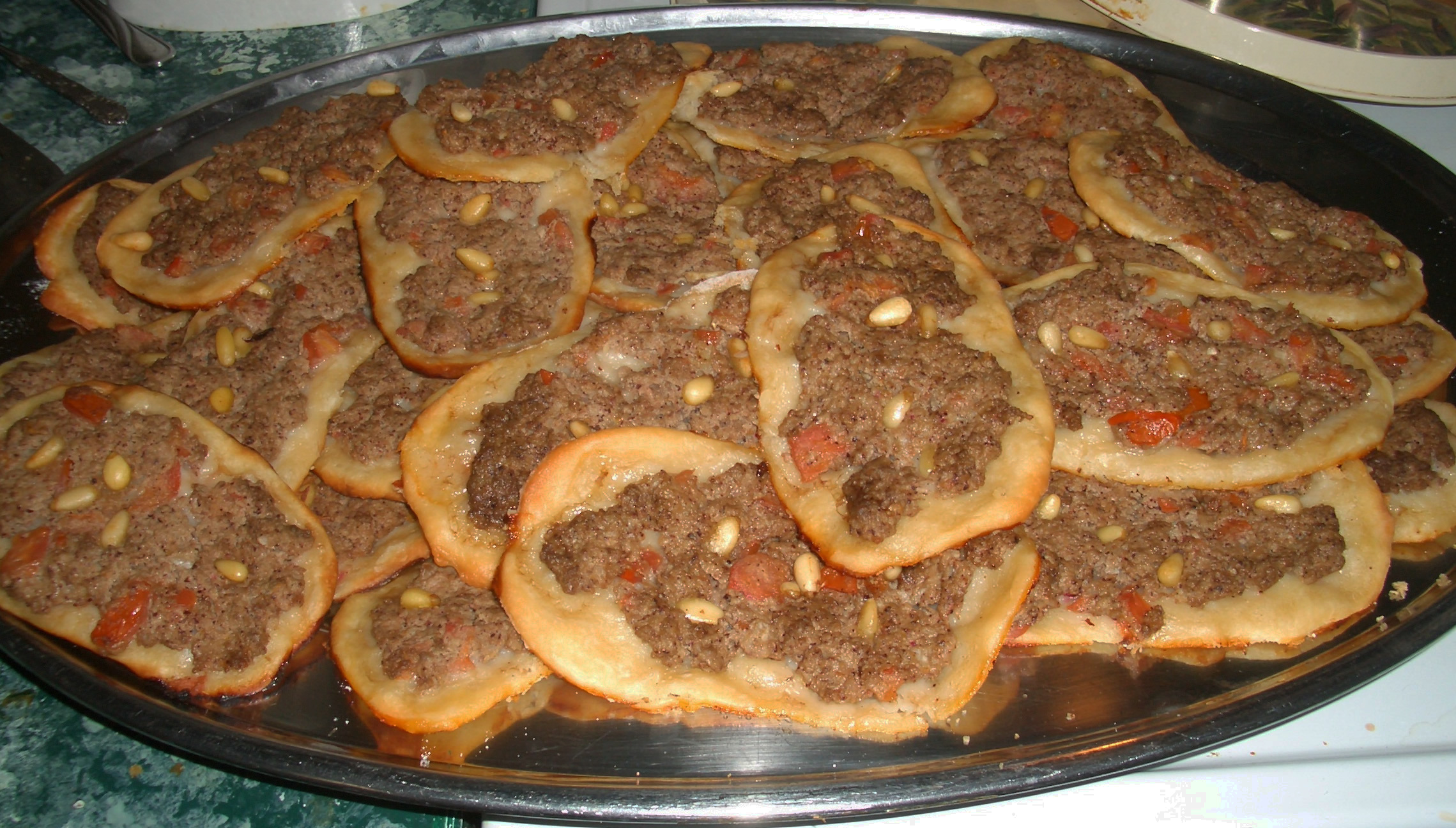
- Alternative names: Lahem bi ajin
- Type: Flatbread
- Place of origin: Levant
- Main ingredients: Ground mutton

Sfiha, esfiha, esfirra, sfija, sfihah, sfeeha or fatay (Arabic: صفيحة, romanized: ṣafīḥa) is a Levantine dish consisting of flatbread cooked with a minced meat topping, often a mix of sheep and veal, and flavored with onions, tomatoes, pine nuts, and spices. It is traditionally found in the countries of the Levant, and is closely related to manakish and lahmacun. Sfiha is particularly associated with Baalbek, a city located in the Beqaa Valley of Lebanon.

Sfiha has become popular in parts of South America, where it is known as esfiha or esfirra in Brazil or as empanada árabe ("Arab empanada"), fatay or sfija in Argentina, after being introduced by Arab Brazilians and Arab Argentines from the Levant and Armenia.

== History ==
Flatbreads have been present in the Fertile Crescent since prehistoric times. They have been cooked on hot surfaces such as stones, a metal sajj plate, taboon, or tandoor. In the medieval Arab world, with the development of the brick oven or furn, a wide variety of flatbreads baked together with stuffings or toppings emerged, including sfiha, and spread across the Ottoman Empire. The exact origin of modern sfiha is unknown.

Literary mentions of it are found in 19th century orientalist texts; proceedings from the 1889 International Congress of Orientalists describe sfeeha (صفيحة) as a piece of dough topped with ground meat and spices. 19th century Orientalist Reinhart Dozy described ṣfīḥa as a "small pastry" (petit pâté) in his dictionary (Supplément aux dictionnaires arabes).

In Brazil, esfiha gained popularity in the late 20th century, and since has become one of the most common fast foods.

== Etymology ==
ṣafīḥa means "sheet" in Arabic. The names "sfiha" and "fatayer" are often used interchangeably, but often, fatayer is used to refer to close faced pastries while sfiha refers to the open faced ones.

== Main ingredients ==
Every family has their own preference on what to add in addition to the meat. In Lebanon, the main ingredients are: meat, onions, tomatoes, pine nuts, salt, pepper, and flavorings such as cinnamon, sumac, or pomegranate molasses. The region of Baalbek is especially known for its sfiha. In Syria, Palestine, and Jordan, sfiha is similarly made with minced meat or lamb, in addition to herbs and spices, with tomatoes, onions, and other ingredients.

Esfihas in Brazil are oven-baked and may be open-faced flatbreads about four inches in diameter with meat topping, or folded into a triangular pastry like fatayer. They may have various toppings, including cheese, curd, lamb, beef or vegetables.

== Regional variations ==
=== Lebanon ===
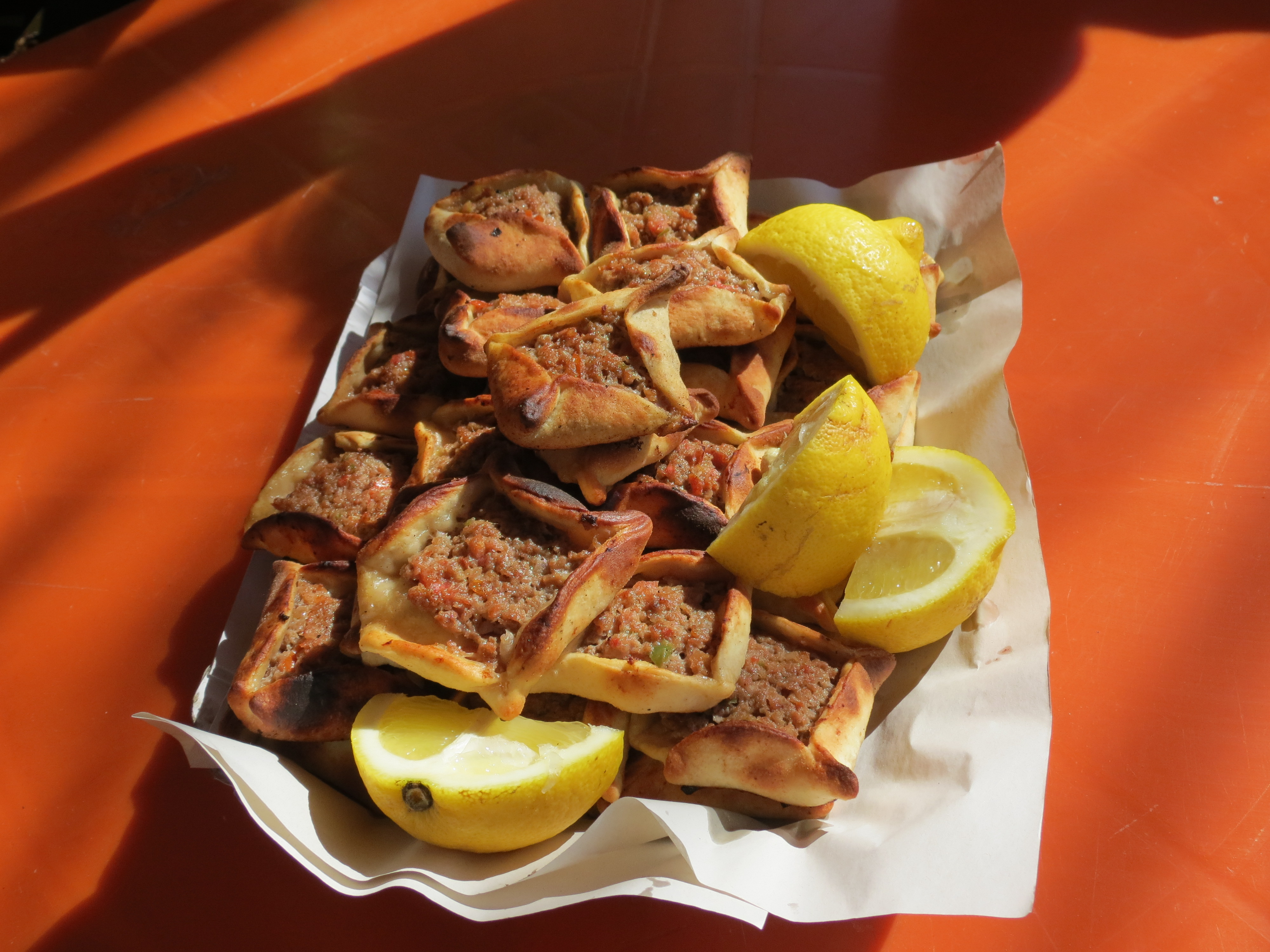
Safeha from Baalbek, 2017

Sfiha Baalbakiya (Levantine Arabic: صفيحة بعلبكية) is a variation of sfiha originating from Baalbek, Lebanon. It is a small meatpie with folded sides with a variety of toppings like nuts and lemon juice, often served for special occasions like weddings. Its availability was impacted by the Lebanese liquidity crisis, which gave rise to cheaper, meatless versions.

=== Palestine ===
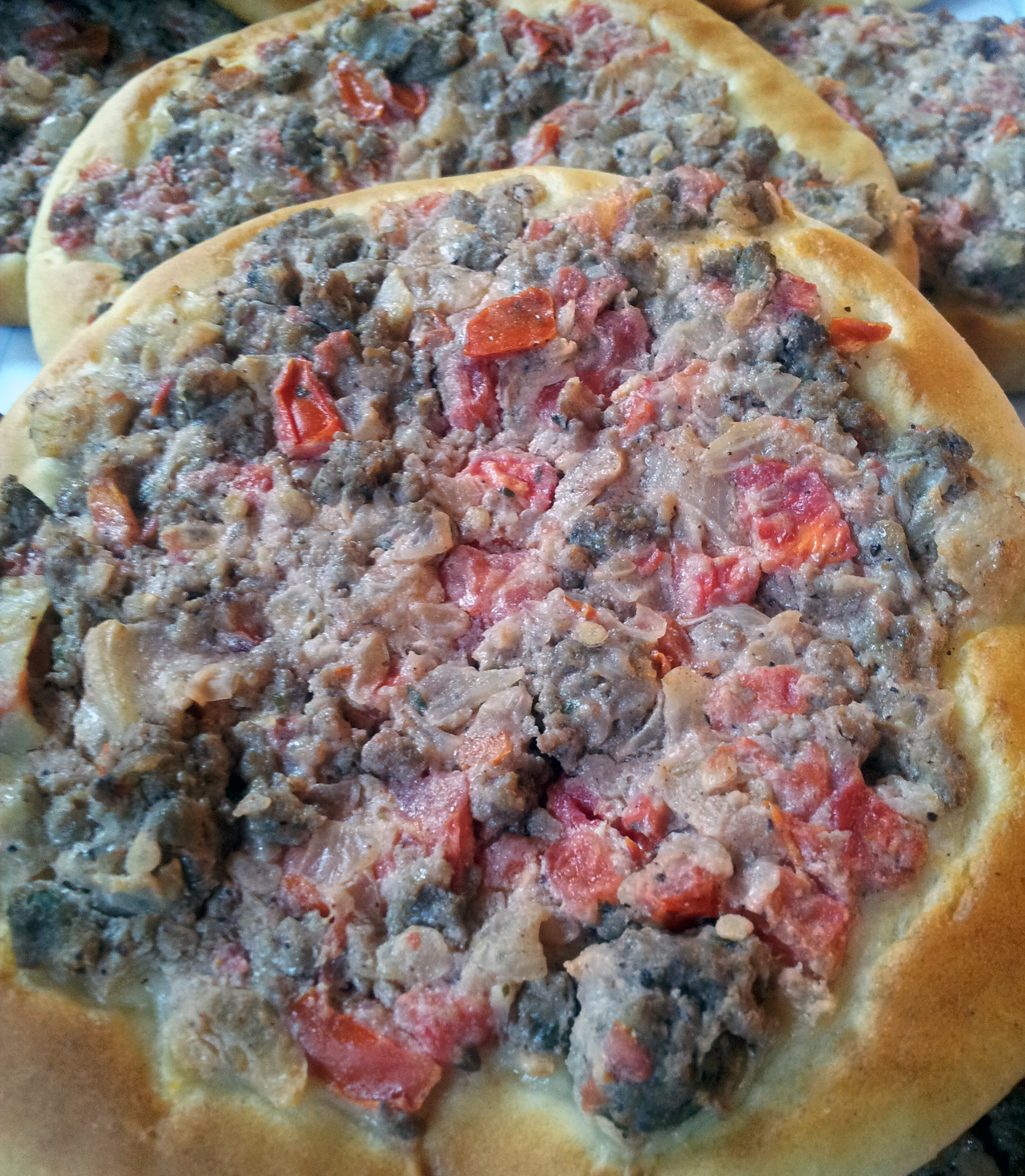
Palestinian sfiha

Sfiha Yafawiyeh (Arabic: صفيحة يافوية, lit. 'Sfeeha from Jaffa') is a variant named after its city of origin, Jaffa. Instead of topping flatbread with meat, the bread is rolled into a spiral shape, filled with meat, and topped with sumac. Outside of Jaffa, Palestinian sfiha is pizza-shaped.

In areas like Bethlehem, tahini is a core component of sfiha.

Armenians in Jerusalem make a variation of sfeeha called "Armenian sfeeha" (Arabic: صفيحة أرمنية) that is very similar to lahmacun, distinguished from Palestinian-style sfeeha by its thinness.

=== Latin America ===
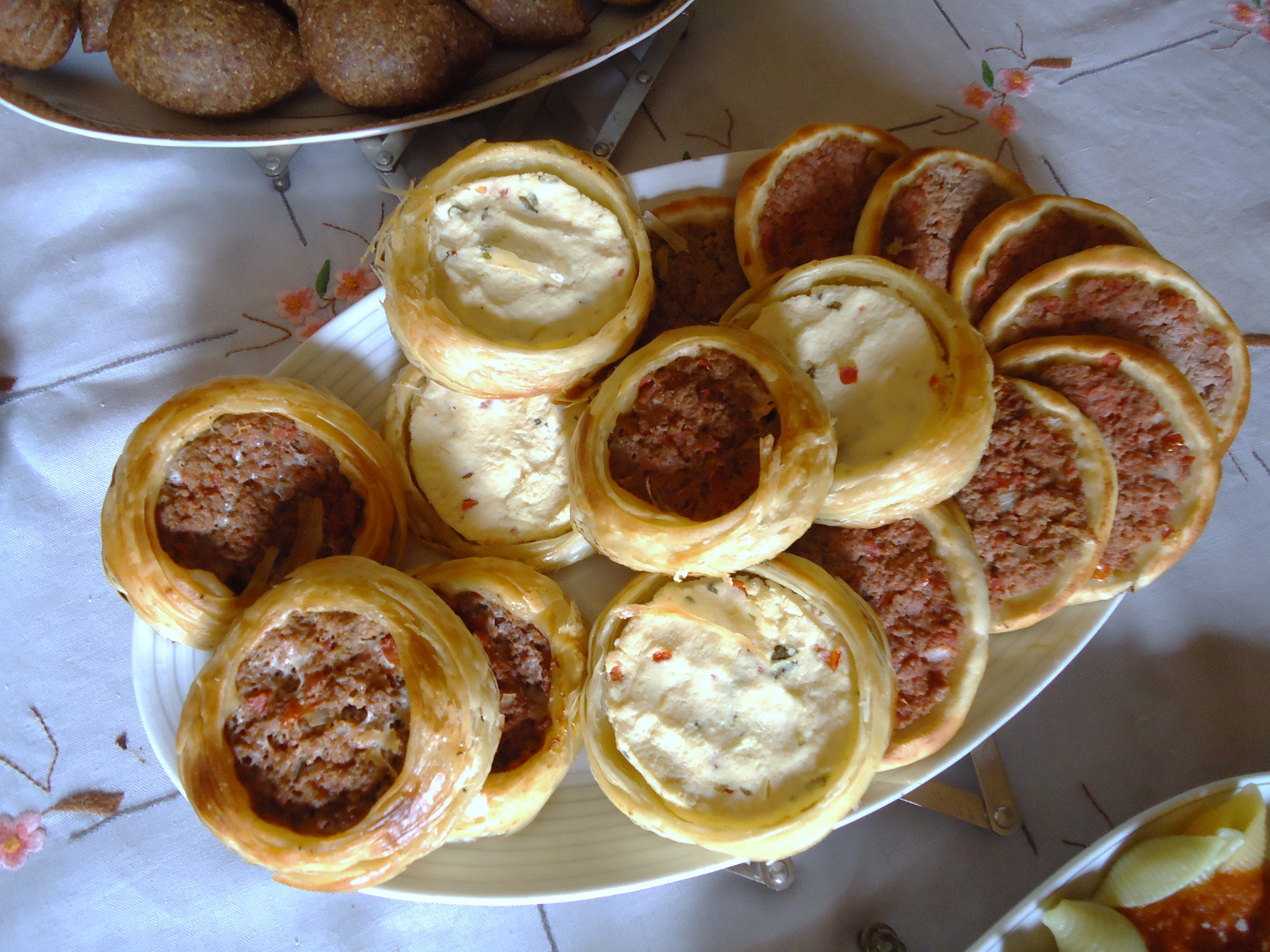
Brazilian esfirra in São Paulo

Esfiha, or esfirra, first appeared in Brazil following the arrival of Lebanese immigrants.

Esfihas come in both sweet and savory forms, with toppings like sausage or chocolate. Some esfihas are closed-faced rather than being open-faced like sfiha, making them more similar to fatayer.

Brazilian fast food chains that offer Arab cuisine-inspired foods like Habib's sell hundreds of millions of esfihas a year.

== Similar dishes ==
Eish bi-lahm (Arabic: عيش باللحم, lit. 'bread with meat') is a Saudi Arabian dish very similar to sfiha. It is a large open-faced meat pie with minced meat and vegetables as filling, with the top covered in egg wash.

=== İçli Pide ===
İçli Pide (Turkish: İçli pide, lit. 'pita with stuffing')), or simply pide, are a group of flatbread dishes in Turkish Cuisine similar to Sfiha.

=== Lahmacun ===
Lahmacun is referred to as sfiha in some regions, and the dishes are similar to one another.

== See also ==
- List of lamb dishes
- List of flatbreads
- Lahmajoun
- Taboon bread
