= Tabun oven =

One of several styles of clay ovens used in the Middle East

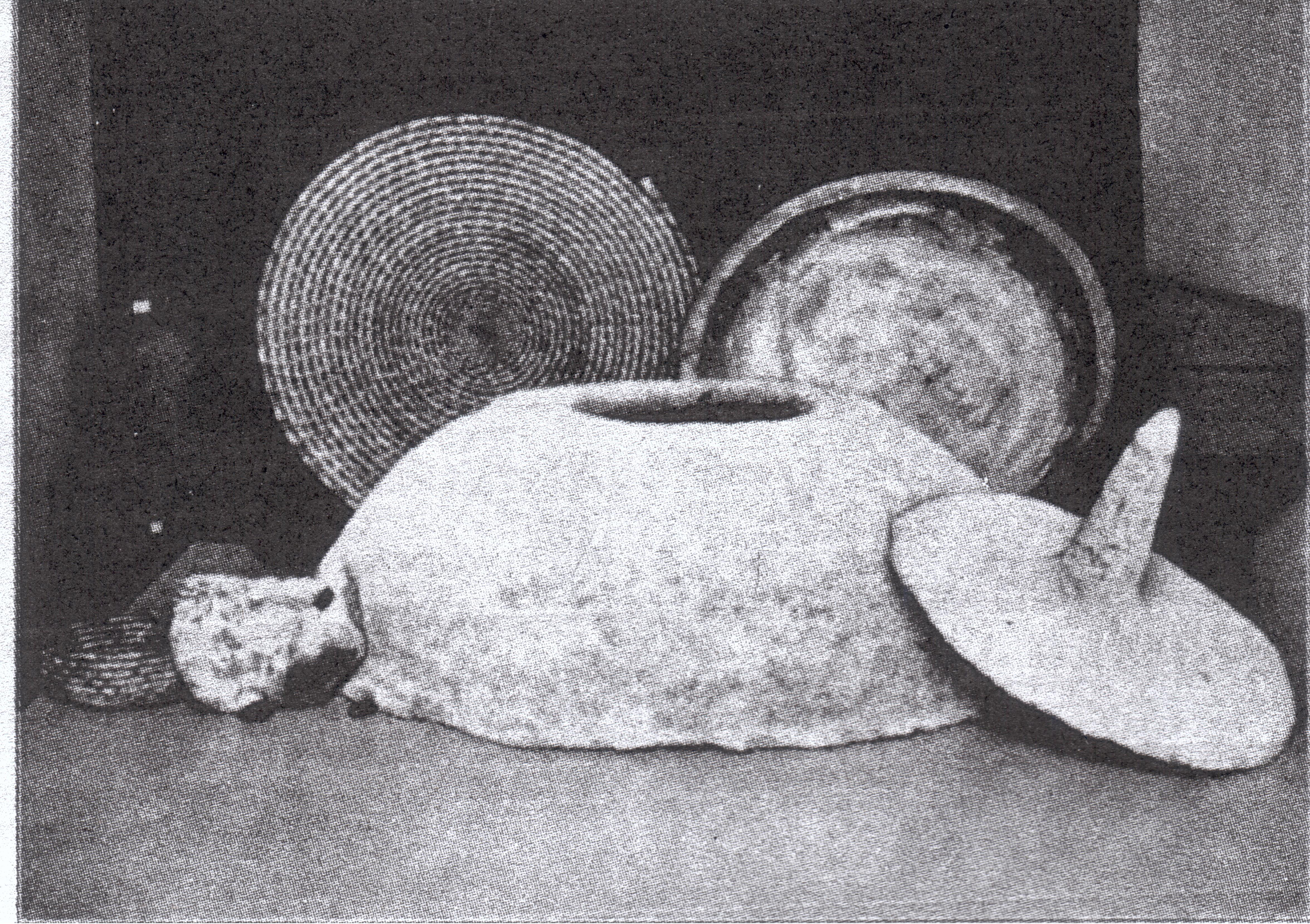
Tabun oven with lid, from Palestine

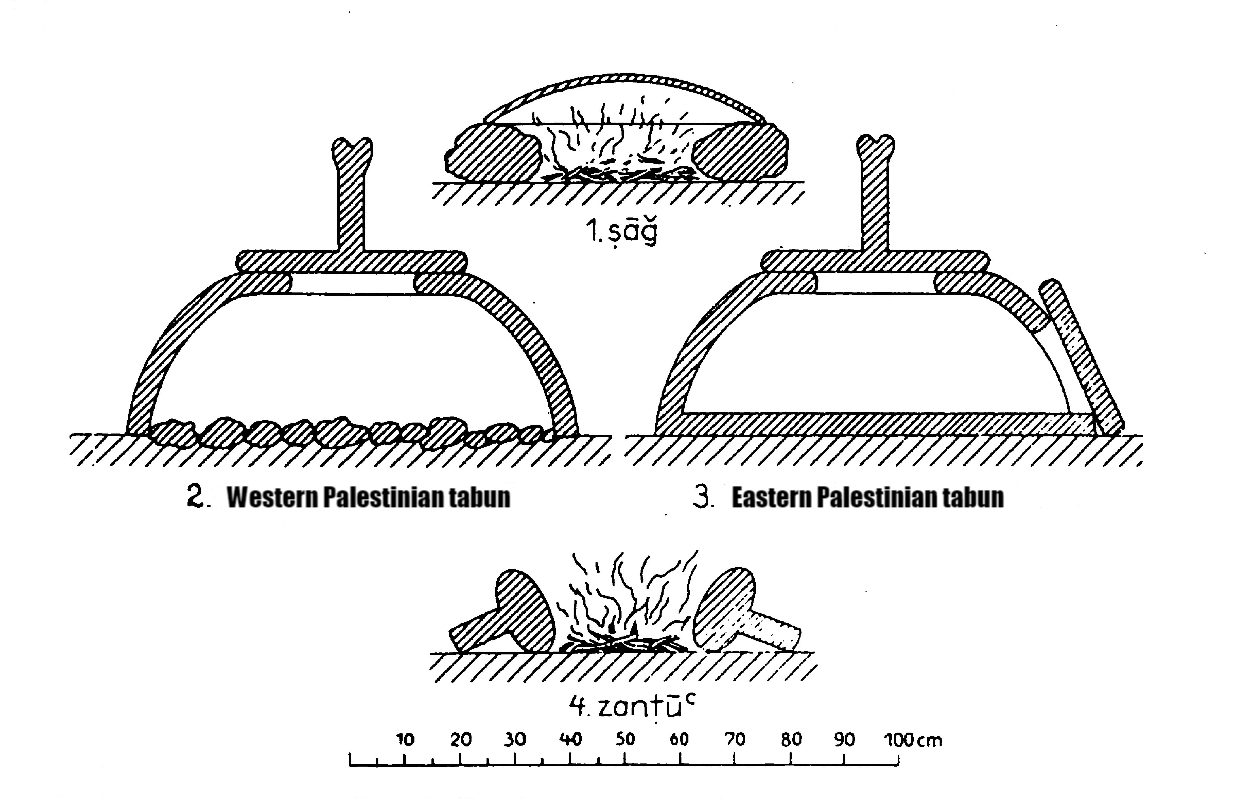
Baking ovens in Palestine: 1. saj, 2. and 3. tabun

A tabun oven, or simply tabun (also transliterated taboon, from the Arabic: طابون), is a portable clay oven, shaped like a truncated cone. While all were made with a top opening, which could be used as a small stove top, some were made with an opening at the bottom from which to stoke the fire. Built and used even before biblical times as the family, neighbourhood, or village oven, tabun ovens continue to be built and used in parts of the Middle East today. Tabun ovens are distinct from tandoors, but are often mistaken for tandoors. Unlike a tandoor, bread inside the oven is placed on a bed of hot stones, rather than being slapped into walls of the oven. In modern times, this form of oven is common in Jordan and Palestine.

== History ==
The tabūn oven has historically been used to bake flatbreads, and has been in widespread use in the greater Middle East for centuries. References to ṭawābīn (طوابين) can be found in the writings of medieval Arab geographer al-Maqdisi, which is described as an oven buried into the ground and spread with pebbles, where bread was baked by placing dough on the pebbles.

== Usage ==
Unlike other ovens, the tabūn is a large, overturned earthenware bowl and completely covers the heated place (usually a bed of smooth stones, upon which a fire is built). After dying out, the ashes are removed and dough is spread out over the smooth stones. Since the tabūn is built with an opening at its top that can be sealed with a ceramic lid, allowing it to be completely smothered over in ashes, dough that is spread out over the stone-lined bottom is quickly baked into bread. When the top ashes are cleared away and the lid removed, a cooking pot can also be laid on top of the tabūn oven for heating and used as a small stove. In some cases, in addition to the hole at the top, there is a second side opening called the "eye of the oven", used for stoking the fire and clearing away the ashes, and which is closed by a detachable door.

Bread dough was spread out on the pebbled floor of the tabun oven's interior, with hot coals and embers scattered with ash piled on top of the exterior shell, along with dried cattle dung.

=== Fuel ===
Many types of fuel or a combination of fuels can be used to heat a tabun. Dried animal dung, dried bird droppings, chopped and dried tree branches or tree trimmings, wood chips, charcoal, dried tree leaves, fabrics, and other materials are potential fuels.

=== Firing ===
The top opening is covered and a layer of fuel (usually dried manure) is spread on the outside of the shell and lid. Once the fire takes hold, the fuel is covered with a layer of ash. The fuel will smolder for hours, usually all night long. The smoke also helps in repelling insects and mosquitoes. In the process, the heat gets stored in the foundation. The amount of fuel varies depending on the amount of baking needed.

=== Baking ===
When the smoke stops, the lid is removed and chunks of dough are hand flattened and placed directly on the limestones. In most ovens, 4 to 5 loaves can be baked at the same time. Then the opening is sealed and the fire is stoked using the hot embers and ashes. When the bread is ready, the lid is removed and the bread taken out. The process can be repeated, or other dishes can be baked using metal or pottery trays. The bottom of the bread will take the shape of the pebbles or other materials used in constructing the oven floor. This baking process is unique and economical and produces aromatic and flavorful food.

In the larger, fixed baking ovens (tannūr), the flattened dough is applied to the inner wall of the oven, after the wall is dampened with a wet cloth, allowing for adhesion. After baking, the bread is removed.

Besides bread, it was also traditionally used to cook the chicken used in musakhan.

== Taboon bread ==
Taboon bread
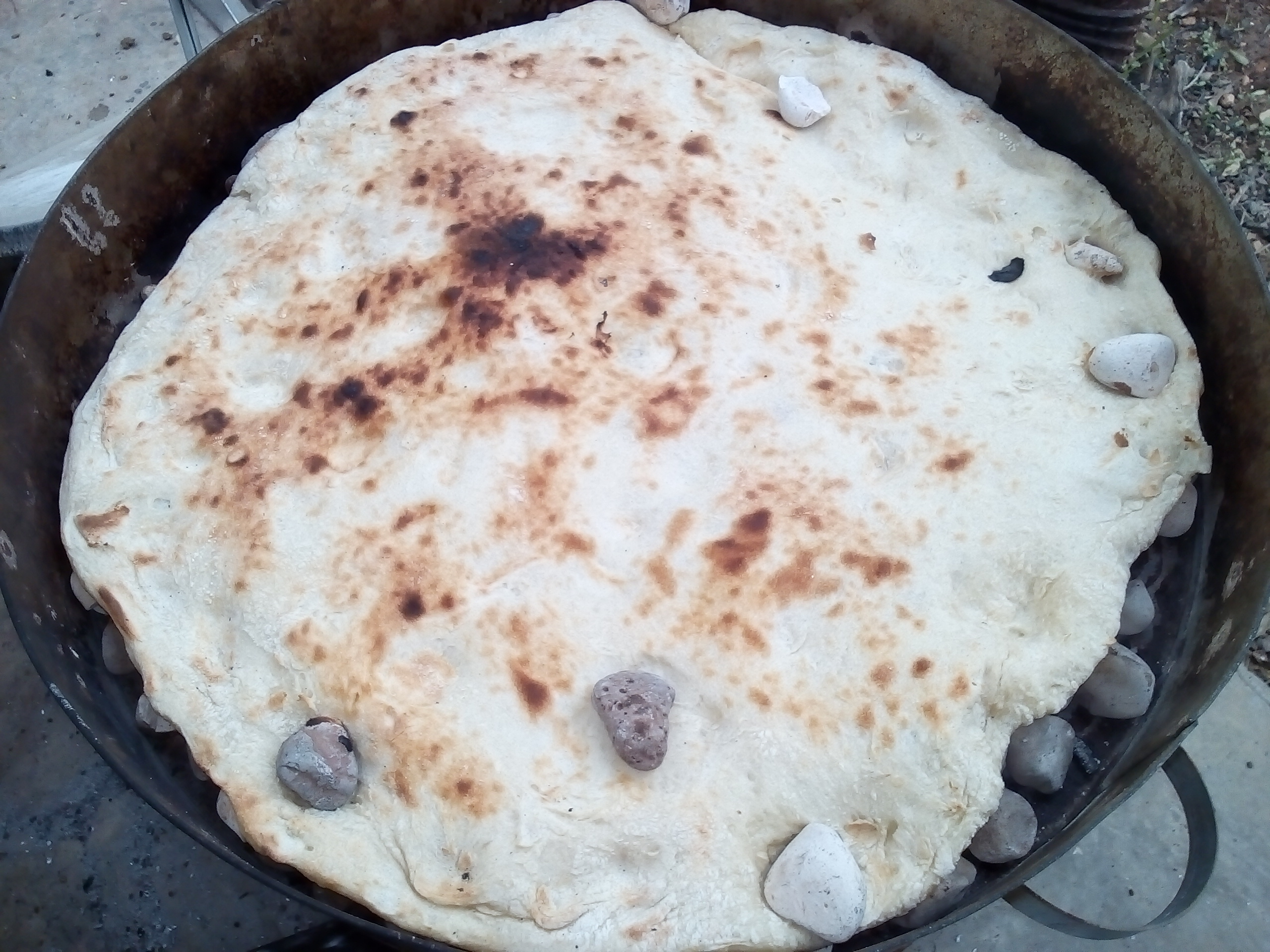
- Taboon bread on a bed of stones
- Type: Flatbread wrap
- Place of origin: Middle East

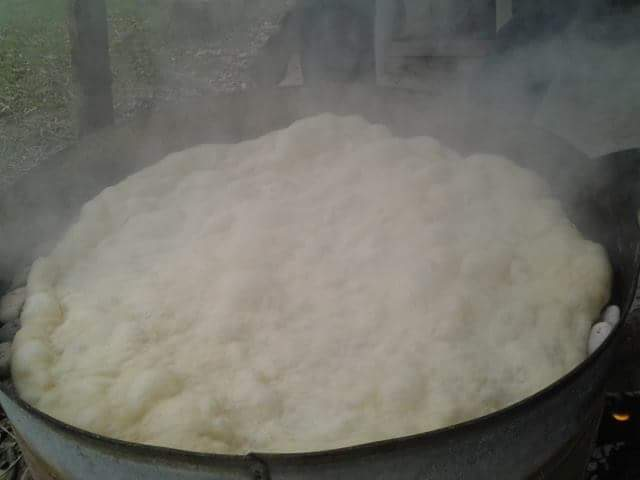
Taboon bread being prepared on a contemporary taboon, Salfit.

Taboon bread (Arabic: خبز طابون, romanized: khubz ṭābūn) is Levantine flatbread baked in a taboon clay oven. It is used as a base or wrap in many cuisines, and eaten with different accompaniments.

=== History ===
17th-century Islamic court records from Ottoman Jerusalem mentioned a bread very similar to modern-day taboon bread called hasawi bread (Arabic: حصوي, lit. 'from pebbles'), baked on a bed of smooth river stones. Prior records from 1530 to 1598 also list the prices of Ṭabbūni and Tannūri breads.

Gustaf Dalman, a German orientalist, documented its making in Palestine in the early 20th century, among other types of breads. In Palestine, folded flatbread was often filled with a spinach and onion mixture, or with cheese curds and onion mixture, or with raisins and pine nuts. The ordinary taboon bread was slightly smaller in size than the ordinary tannur bread. Over the centuries, bread-making in communal taboons played an important social role for women in Palestinian villages.

=== Variations ===
Taboon bread is an important part of Palestinian cuisine, traditionally baked on a bed of small hot stones in the taboon oven. The hot stones give the bread an uneven texture and prevent the formation of bubbles in the bread due to the expanding water vapor, which facilitates adding toppings to it, but also prevents the formation of an inner hollow pocket like pita. It is the base of musakhan, often considered the national dish of Palestine.

Besides regular bread, tabun ovens were traditionally used to prepare breads like manakish and maltout.

== Construction ==
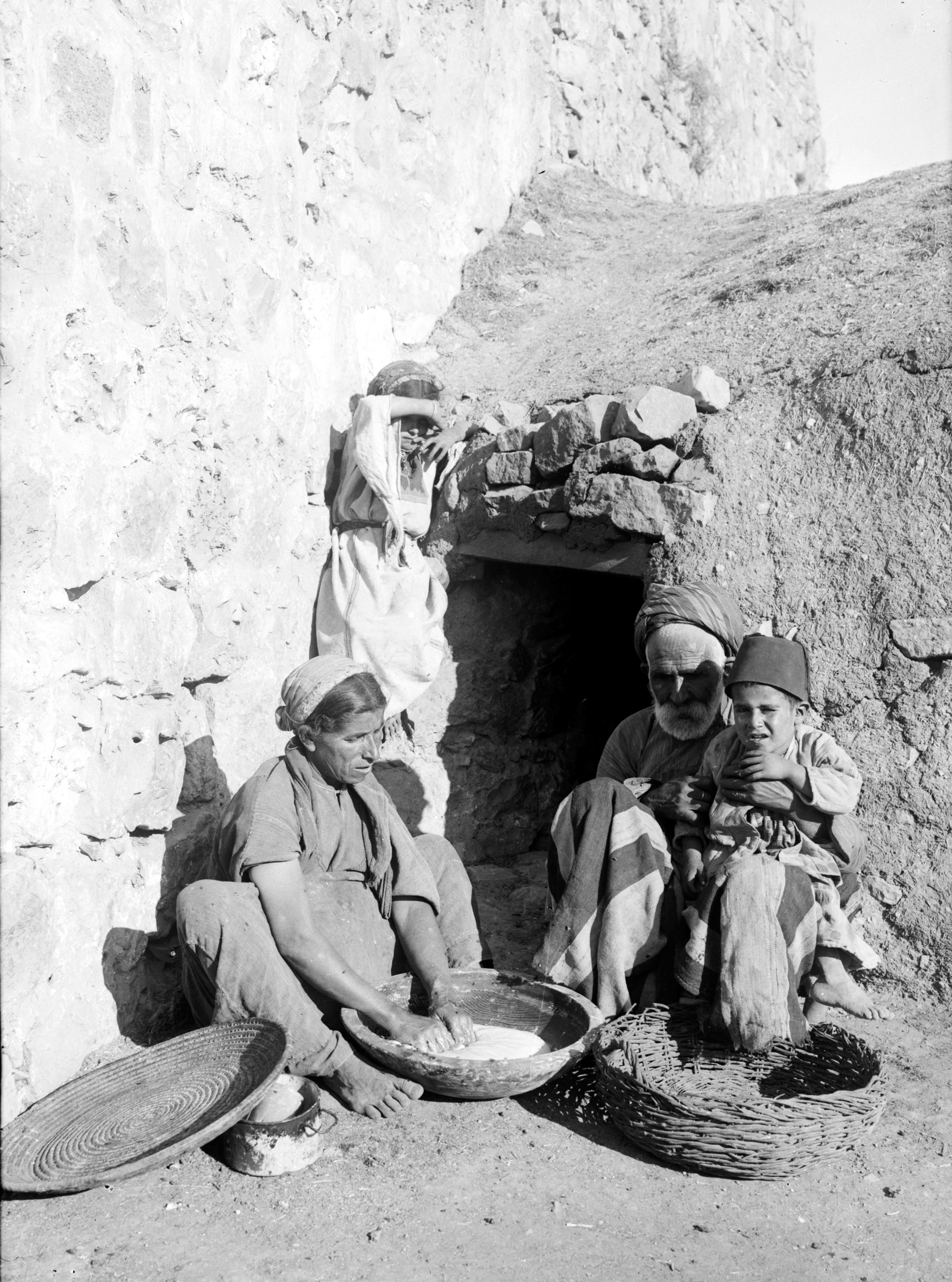
Woman kneading bread in front of a baking hut which contains a tabun

=== Shell ===
The shell is made of yellow pottery clay soil. The best is from Aaroub or Al Aaroub. The soil is wetted and made into a thick clay mixed with chopped stubble and straw from harvested wheat. The clay is hand-formed to make the dome-shaped shell. It can be as much as 82 centimetres (32 in) in diameter at its base, about 32 centimetres (13 in) high, with an open top, approximately 23 centimetres (9.1 in) in diameter. In some places, the shell may be as high as 2 1/2 feet and 2 feet wide. The shell wall is about 2.54 cm (1 in) to 5 cm (2 in) thick. The shell is sun baked for weeks, before it is fired.

=== Foundation ===
The earthenware shell is placed over an impression in the earth, usually about 4 feet (1.2 m) to 5 feet (1.5 m) in diameter and about 38 centimetres (15 in) to 51 centimetres (20 in) in depth. This impression is usually filled with sand and gravel, or with compacted locally abundant materials known to handle and store heat, such as broken glass, rock salt, and broken potsherds, over which layer beach stones or Suwan stones (flint stones) are carefully embedded.

=== Lid ===
The lid is made of clay or a sheet metal piece large enough to cover the top opening.

=== Process ===
In a sheltered area, usually a clay hut or a cave, the foundation is dug in the ground, filled, and compacted. The shell is placed, wider side down, on top. A layer of clean smooth limestone pebbles about 2.54 cm (1 in) in diameter is spread on top of foundation inside the shell to form a clean baking surface.

== See also ==
- Wood-fired oven

For those related to taboon bread:

- Lahmacun
- Manakish
- Al-Maltout

== Bibliography ==
- Negev, Avraham; Gibson, Shimon (2005), Archaeological Encyclopedia of the Holy Land, Continuum International Publishing Group, ISBN 9780826485717
