= Clay oven =

Primitive baking ovens

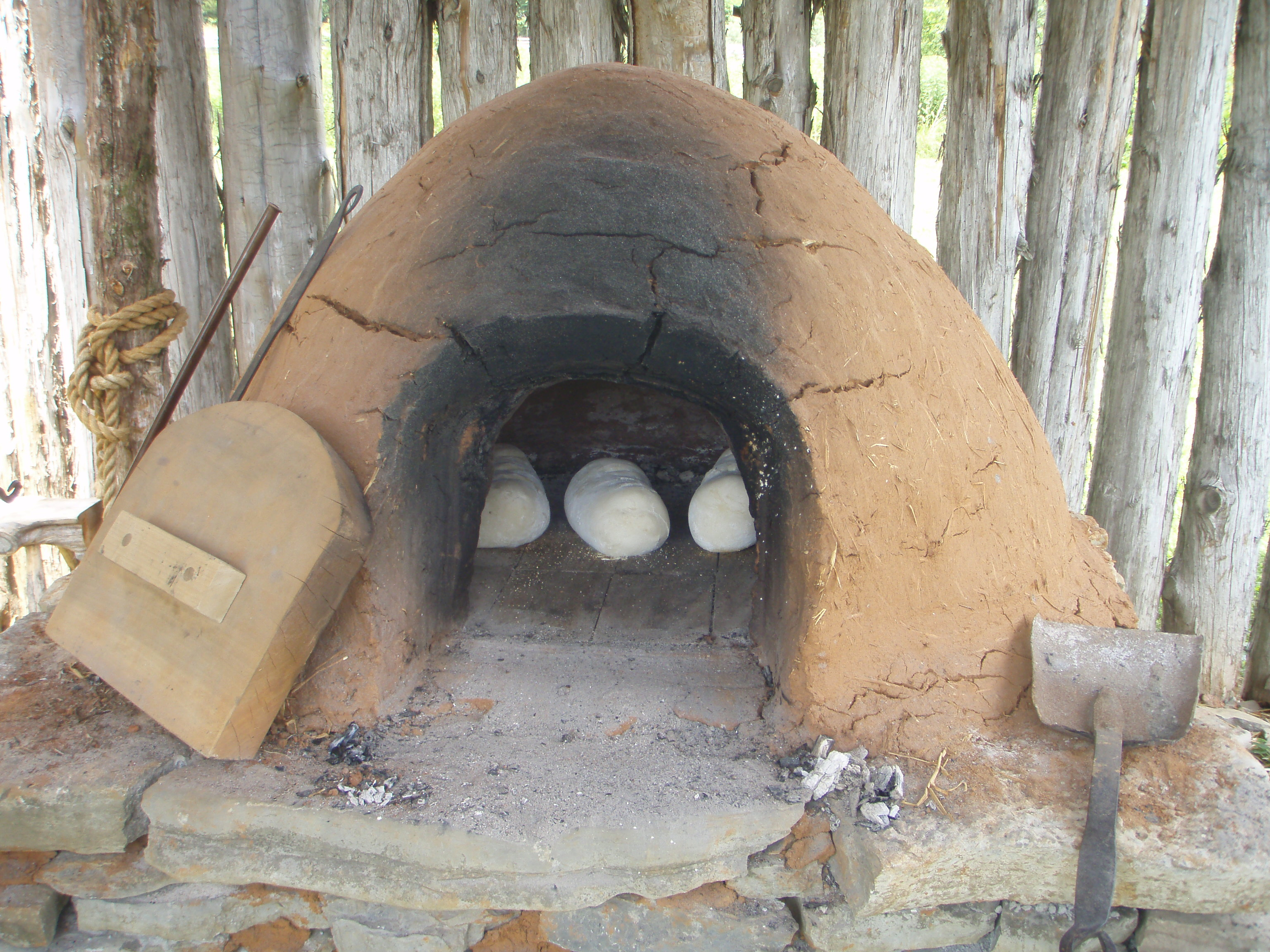
18th-century baking oven (American-European)

The primitive clay oven, earthen oven, or cob oven has been used since ancient times by diverse cultures and societies, primarily for, but not exclusive to, baking before the invention of cast-iron stoves, and gas and electric ovens. The general build and shape of clay ovens were, mostly, common to all peoples, with only slight variations in size and in materials used to construct the oven. In primitive courtyards and farmhouses, earthen ovens were built on the ground.

In Arabian, Middle Eastern and North African societies, bread was often baked within a clay oven called in some Arabic dialects a tabun (also transliterated taboon, from the Arabic: طابون), or else in a clay oven called a tannour, and in other dialects mas'ad. The clay oven, synonymous with the Hebrew word tannour, lit. 'oven', was shaped like a truncated cone, with an opening either at the top or bottom from which to stoke the fire. Others were cylindrical with an opening at the top. Built and used in ancient times as family, neighbourhood, or village ovens, clay ovens continue to be made in parts of the Middle East.

== History and usage ==
The earthen oven has historically been used for baking flatbreads such as taftoon (Persian: تافتون), taboon bread and laffa, and has been in widespread use in the greater Middle East for centuries. Aside from baking, some were used for cooking: pots were laid within the cavity of the oven and set upon hot coals, covered in ashes. If the pots were intended to be left in the oven for an extended period of time (such as the night of the Sabbath day in Jewish culture where the food is left to cook until the next day), the opening at the top of the oven would be covered with a large, earthenware vessel. They would then add old rags around this vessel used to seal up the oven, in order to make the oven impervious to air around all the cooking pots. Where the opening was on the side, the door which covered the opening had to be left partially open to allow for combustion of the fire and coals during its initial lighting. The earthen oven differed slightly from earthen stoves and ranges where, in the case of the latter, the pots were laid directly over the stove and a fire stoked below.

== Middle Eastern types ==
=== Tabun ===
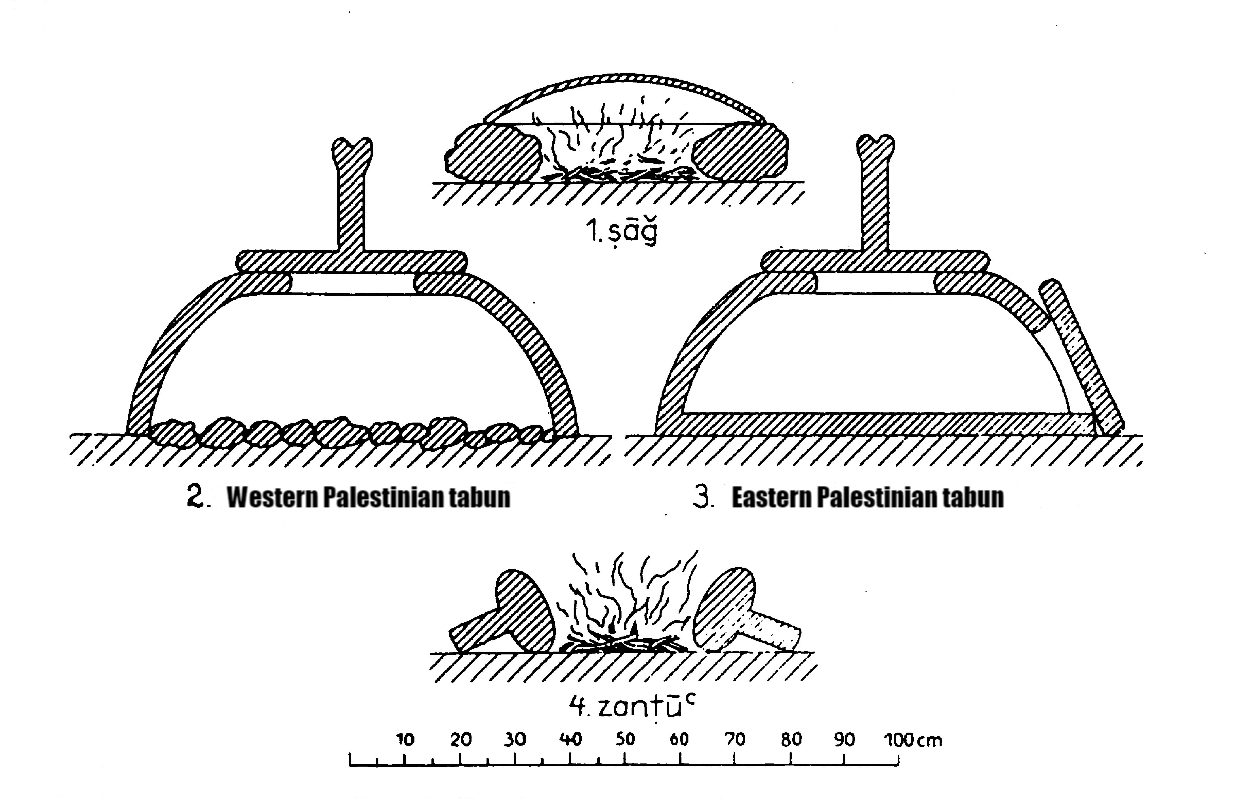
Baking ovens in the Holy Land: 1. saj, 2. and 3. tabun

Gustaf Dalman (1855–1941), describing the material culture of the Holy Land in the early 20th century, photographed several types of clay ovens which he saw in use there. Of those ovens used for baking bread, there was the tabun shaped like a large, bottomless earthenware pot turned upside down and fastened permanently to the ground. It has a pebbled floor made of either smooth beach pebbles or limestone pebbles. The pot-shaped contour was wider at the base and narrower at the top, where the opening was, used both for kindling the fire, and for inserting dough for baking. A second, similar type of oven had, in addition to the hole at the top, a second side opening called the "eye of the oven", used for stoking the fire and clearing away the ashes, and closed by a detachable door. This type had a ceramic floor. Both versions were equipped with a ceramic lid with a handle, used for covering and sealing the top opening (see illustration). These ovens were, typically, small in size and were placed within a baking hut to protect them from the elements. Some tabun ovens were "dug-ins", half built into the ground and half above-ground. Baking was made on the pebbled floor of the oven, after the bowl-like exterior wall of the clay oven that sat over the floor like an inverted cup had been covered, itself, with hot coals and embers scattered with ash, usually placed atop dried cattle dung.

=== Tannur / tannour; tandoor ===
Tinuru was the ancient Sumerian word for a basic clay oven, and this important technology of daily life and its descriptive name were carried through the ages to many other peoples and culture, manifesting in the Arab (تنور) tannur, Indian tandoor, Iranian (تَنور) tanur and Turkish tannura. The term tannur also appears in Hebrew (תנור) in the bible and Mishnah 15 times, as a place where bread is baked by fire.

In Yemen, the most common of clay ovens served both for baking and cooking. Its shape was cylindrical and reached half the height of man, and was made with a wide-open top, called the "mouth of the oven" (Arabic: bâb al-manaq), its top being uniform in diameter with that of the oven's base. Kindling was admitted through the opening in the top. A small air-hole was also made therein at the base of the oven, called the "eye of the oven," which was made to ensure sufficient air circulation, as well as used to clear out the oven from its accumulated wood-ash. This oven had a flat, detachable ceramic lid made for it, with its own distinct rim, and which lid covering could be placed on its top and could hold additional pots and pans when needed. In such ovens, flat dough was pressed against the interior wall of the oven, whereunto it adhered until it was baked. Unleavened bread at Passover was made in the same way. The sealed pot containing the Yemenite-Jewish kubaneh was also placed in such ovens, laid upon the oven floor, upon its dying embers. Pots containing viands and kettles of coffee were first brought to a boil and then kept hot by brushing aside the coals and embers to one side of the oven, covering the coals over with ashes, and placing the pots and kettles beside the ash-covered coals. Such ovens were almost always built within baking rooms (Arabic: al-daymeh = الديمة) or rustic kitchens adjoining a courtyard.

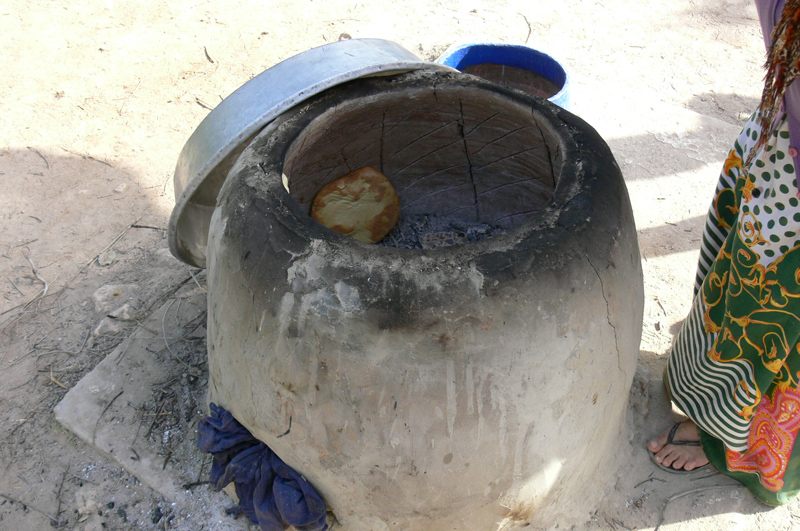
Tannour

The tannour described by Gustaf Dalman in use among the Palestinian peasants (fellahin) of Palestine stood approximately 70 centimetres (28 in) to 100 centimetres (39 in) high, was cylindrical and made of clay. It measured 60 centimetres (24 in) to 70 centimetres (28 in) wide on the bottom and narrowed upwards. From the varied ovens described by him, an earthen oven may or may not be buried in the ground; it can be cylindrical, egg-shaped, pointed or curved. If necessary, it was also possible to convert a large water jug into a tannour.

In cylindrical clay ovens used in Syria Palaestina in the 1st and 2nd centuries CE, and where the opening was on top, they were often equipped with a flat, detachable lid (tablet) made of clay and which was usually perforated to allow for the retention of heat when needed, and the smoke to be emitted.

In some societies, such as in the villages around Aleppo, in Syria, the earthen oven (tannour) was vaulted and egg-shaped, the opening of which was made in the front, and the entire structure built above-ground by having it propped-up upon an earth and stone base. Its outer shell was thick, and could be anywhere between a handbreadth (9 centimetres (3.5 in)) to 15.25 centimetres (6.00 in) in thickness. Such shapes were typically found in Europe and in the British isles. In Europe and Britain, however, bread was baked on the floor of the oven, usually made of brick or tile. The dome-shaped oven in western societies was often built upon a stone and earth plinth to make it higher and easier to use, without having to bend over. Some ovens were made with flues; others without.

=== Furn / Purnei / Purnah ===
The furn is a furnace-like oven, the name being a loanword borrowed from the Greek (φούρνος, fūrnos) and earlier Latin, and which, according to Maimonides, was also made of clay.

The eleventh-century talmudic exegete, Rashi, who was of the Jewish Diaspora in France, explained its meaning as being "our large ovens whose mouths are at their side" (i.e., masonry oven).

The 10th-century Arab geographer al-Muqaddasī describes the furn that he had seen widely used in his day, writing: "The peasantry all of them possess ovens called furn, and those of them who can get burnt bricks make small bread-ovens (tannûr) in the ground. They line these with pebbles, and kindling the fire of dried-dung within and above, they afterwards remove the hot ashes and place the loaves of bread to bake upon these pebbles when they have become thus red-hot."

Gustaf Dalman (1855–1941) describes the furn which he had seen in Palestine, most of which were made of clay, as being mostly small and built with two compartments – the lower, a "boiler room" used to stoke the fire and which rests upon the ground; the upper, a "baking room" where the round leavened dough was laid down upon a flat surface and heated from below. In Palestine, these ovens also bore the additional name of ʻarṣa (qarṣa). In new furns that had yet to be fired, there was a danger of its dividing compartment collapsing or crumbling apart at its first firing. Based on samples of bread collected in Palestine, the leavened flatbread baked in a furn could be as large as, or smaller than, the flatbread baked in a tannour.

The furn in modern parlance is also associated with being a "public bakery," where flat-loaves of bread are baked wholesale to be sold in market, or where, in some countries, local villagers bring there certain produce, such as heaps of green chickpeas (Cicer arietinum) with their husks for roasting (when placed either in a clay oven or upon a convex griddle, known as ṣāj), or the flat round bread made with an impression containing omelettes.

=== Saj ===
The saj (ṣāğ), though also used in baking, is unlike the clay oven. It is rather a convex griddle made of metal, on which is spread a thin, unleavened dough. Dalman describes it in 1935 as being used by Bedouins from Syria all the way to Arabia, because it can be transported, unlike the tābūn and tannūr. It is still used today by Bedouins and other Arabs in Israel-Palestine, as well as by the indigenous peoples of Lebanon, Turkey, and Iraq, although the ingredients used in making their bread differ. The saj is made to rest upon large stones and a fire is lit beneath it.

=== Yemeni ovens ===
In Yemeni households, the kitchen or bake-room was built adjacent to an open-air courtyard and furnished with a hearth (maḥall et-tanâwir) which was freestanding, consisting of a socle with mud-bricks or masonry stones arranged in a bed of lime mortar, usually 250 centimetres (98 in) in length, 80 centimetres (31 in) to 110 centimetres (43 in) in height, and 60 centimetres (24 in) in breadth. Built into this socle were three separate ovens (tannûr, pl. tanâwir). The space in between the ovens was often filled with sifted wood ash, instead of soil, because of its light weight and its ability to heat quickly and retain the heat. In the early 20th-century, German ethnographer Carl Rathjens described the ovens that he had seen in the Old City of Sana'a, and which were similarly constructed by Jews and Arabs alike:

The product of Jewish potters, they (i.e. the clay ovens) are made of burnt clay and look like round pots without bottoms, being open at both ends and having a semi-circular hole on one side. They are built into the mortar base in such a way that the side-hole (bâb al-manâq) is in the front, about fifteen centimeters above the floor. Through this hole, wood, charcoal or dried dung is fed into the stove, and the cooking pots are placed on the upper opening.

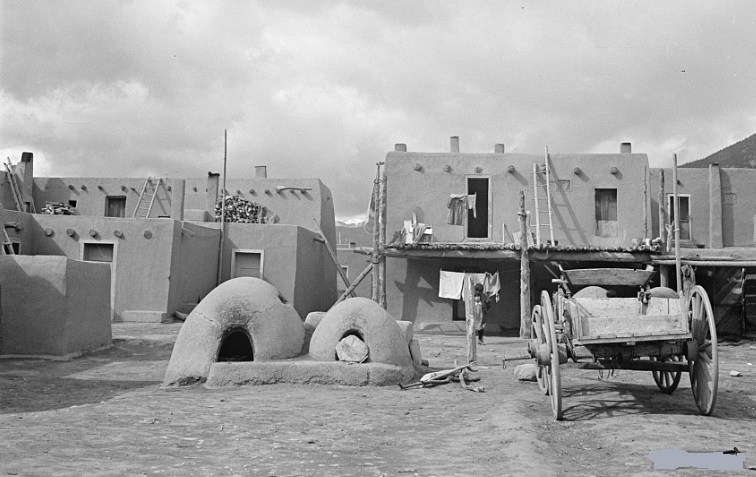
Horno - mud adobe-built outdoor oven (near Taos, New Mexico)

== Terracotta baking covers of ancient Italy ==
The words clibani (Latin) / κλίβανοι (Greek) denote "baking oven" in their respective languages. The words are transcribed in, both, the Greek Septuagint (q.v. Leviticus 11:35) and in Jerome's Latin Vulgate (op. cit.), and are often mentioned by Greek and Latin authors under the name clibanus, the use of which seems to have entailed baking in what Roman authors have called sub testus, in which the ingredients were cooked under an earthenware cover, over which ashes were heaped. Others suggest that a space on the floor was cleared upon which a small heap of lighted coals was set. The baking cover was then placed or hung over the coals, and when sufficiently hot, it was raised and the coals swept aside. The dough was then put onto the hot floor, at which time the hot cover was replaced over the dough. Coals were then heaped over the sides of the cover and the bread left to bake.

Based on other literary and archaeological finds, scholars have identified five principal methods of baking in Roman Italy, which, in addition to the above baking cover method (similar to the tabun in Arabic-speaking countries), families also practised baking directly onto hot ashes and cinders, whereby bread was placed on leaves or pieces of tile set on a low hearth and covered by embers from the fire. Today, such bread is known as an ash cake. Small stationary ovens were later introduced in Italy, built into a kitchen range. Afterwards, even larger and more efficient ovens were made, namely, the furnus (masonry oven). Another type included a portable version of the clibanus.

== Preparatory steps before baking ==
=== Fuel ===
Many types of fuel or a combination of fuels can heat an earthen oven. Dried animal dung, dried bird droppings, chopped and dried tree branches or tree trimmings, wood chips, charcoal, were all used as potential fuels, depending on the country.

In Yemen, they made use of combustible fuels that were made available to them, the best wood comprising ḍahya (Arabic: الضهياء = Acacia asak) or qaraḍ (Arabic: قرظ = Acacia etbaica; A. nilotica kraussiana), and which was usually sold in the Wood Market. The poor made use of tamarisk trees (Tamarix nilotica) for kindling.

Occasionally, there was no need for a large fire, such as when they baked laḥūḥ (the sponge-like flat bread), or when roasting kernels, legumes and grain, and things similar. In such cases, they merely made use of a light and inexpensive heating material. For this purpose, the Arab women would carry large baskets of leaves and splinters upon their heads, such which fall from the trees, especially the deciduous leaves of the tamarisk, which is plenteous there and is called hamal. Briquettes prepared from the waste droppings of animals were also used to light a fire in the clay oven, and which are processed and dried by the Arab villagers. The best of these were those made from the droppings of sheep, and the least useful of them all were those made from donkey manure.

=== Firing ===
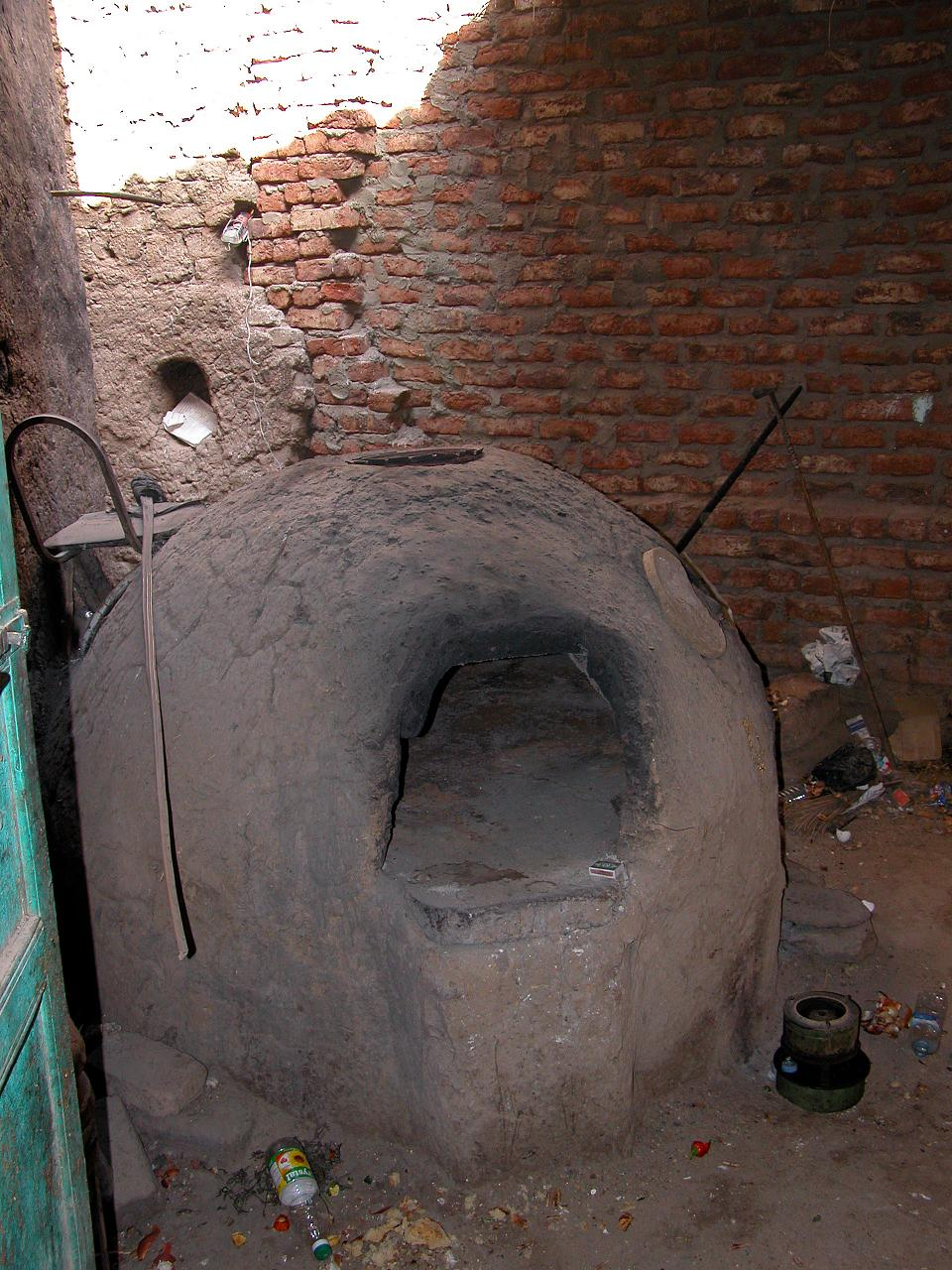
Tannour (Egypt)

Where clay ovens are made with a top opening, it is covered and when coffee was to be prepared in kettles, they were laid on top of such ovens with the initial kindling of the fire. In the case of a tabun oven where there was no top opening, a layer of fuel (usually dried manure) is spread on the outside of the shell and lid. Once the fire takes hold, the fuel is covered with a layer of ash. When damp wood was used, the fuel would smolder for hours, filling the baking rooms with the smoke. After the initial flames had died down a little, the kettles were removed from the oven's top, and the oven at this time was ready to receive the prepared dough that was made to cling to the inner-wall of the oven. The amount of fuel varies depending on the amount of baking that was needed.

In Yemen, whenever the woman of the house wished to light a fire in her tannour, she would take-up a little of each kind of wood kindling and arrange them in the oven. First, she would place thin splinters (luṣwah; Arabic: لصوة) or twigs within the mouth of the oven, and directly on top of it she would place thin pieces of wood, followed by thicker pieces of wood. On the two sides of the wood pile she would set up two briquettes of sheep dung (kiba; Arabic: الكبا), and then she would set down over the stove all the cooking pots and the coffee kettles that needed heating. The most important splinters for lighting were the jiʿdin, which is a bush where there was a sticky, elastic-like flammable substance between its bark and wood. The substance was flammable and would light quickly. The fire is started in the oven by inserting a burning rag or paper.

=== Baking ===
When the smoke resides, the lid is removed and chunks of dough are hand flattened and placed directly on the limestones (in the case of tabun oven). In most ovens, 4 to 5 loaves can be baked at the same time. Then the opening is sealed and the fire stoked using the hot embers and ashes. When the bread is ready, the lid is removed and the bread taken out. The process can be repeated, or other dishes can be baked using metal or pottery trays. The bottom of the bread will take the shape of the pebbles or other materials used in constructing the oven floor. This baking process is unique and economical and produces aromatic and flavorful food.

In Yemen, when the fire was kindled in the larger tannour and all pot-filled dishes began to boil, the flames were allowed to die down a little. The householder who tended the cooking then removed the cooking pots and the coffee kettles from off the stove top, and would then begin to bake the bread on the inner walls of the oven. The flattened dough is applied to the inner-wall of the oven, after the wall is dampened with a wet cloth, allowing for adhesion. The dough was traditionally flattened-out on a maḫbazeh – the round, knitted baker's kerchief or pillow used for protection when sticking the dough into the oven, fitted snugly with a cloth. The dough was spread out firmly upon the maḫbazeh, until it was sufficiently thin, and was then applied to the interior wall of the earthen oven, so as to bake it on its obverse side. If the bare hands were used to apply the dough, the baker would baste the surface of the dough with the water obtained from soaking ground fenugreek seeds, to prevent the dough from sticking to the baker's hand when applying it to the inner surface of the oven. When bubble-like configurations appeared on the surface of the bread, it signaled that it was ready.

After baking, the bread is removed. If there was much to bake, the householder would put within the mouth of the oven a dry piece of wood so that the flame of its burning will cook and cause to steam the outer layer of the bread. This piece of wood is called in Arabic mudhwa (Arabic: مَضوى, lit. 'lightered'). When he finished baking, he then placed within the oven a knotted piece of wood, of the kind which are hardest to burn (Arabic: عُقدة, romanized: ʿuqdeh, lit. 'wood knot'), usually taken from the place where the shoots sprout from the tree's trunk. The householder added thereto a cake of sheep dung and would bury the wood and cake of sheep dung in the midst of the fire, covering them over with a thin layer of ash, so that they would burn slowly and the oven would remain hot for a long time. This covering of ash is called in Arabic tubnah. To keep the cooked dishes hot, the householder would lay up within the earthen oven all her cooking pots and the coffee kettles around the meager pile of ash-covering, and then seal the side-opening of the oven by inserting its removable door-like covering. In Jewish culture, especially on days where it was impossible to build a fire, but where prolonging the existing heat of the oven was necessary, the hot coals were, in advance, pushed to one side and covered over in ashes, while the entire clay oven was covered over with a larger earthenware vessel, to which old rags were added along the edges to seal the heat within it. In so doing, whenever dishing out soup or pouring a drink of coffee, they would remain hot.

Experienced bakers knew when they needed only a light heat, such as when roasting grain or baking lahoh, in which cases they would add inexpensive light wood to the oven. In 18th-century English clay ovens, whenever the temperature of the clay oven became too hot, they were frequently doused with cold water, or its flooring swabbed with a wet mop.

== Method of construction ==
In the Land of Israel during classical times, the baking oven (Hebrew: tannour) was constructed in similar fashion as the tabun (popularly in use amongst Arabs). Like the tabun, it too was made like unto a large, bottomless eathenware pot, turned upside down and fixed permanently onto the ground by plastering it with clay, usually in a family's courtyard where there was a baking hut.

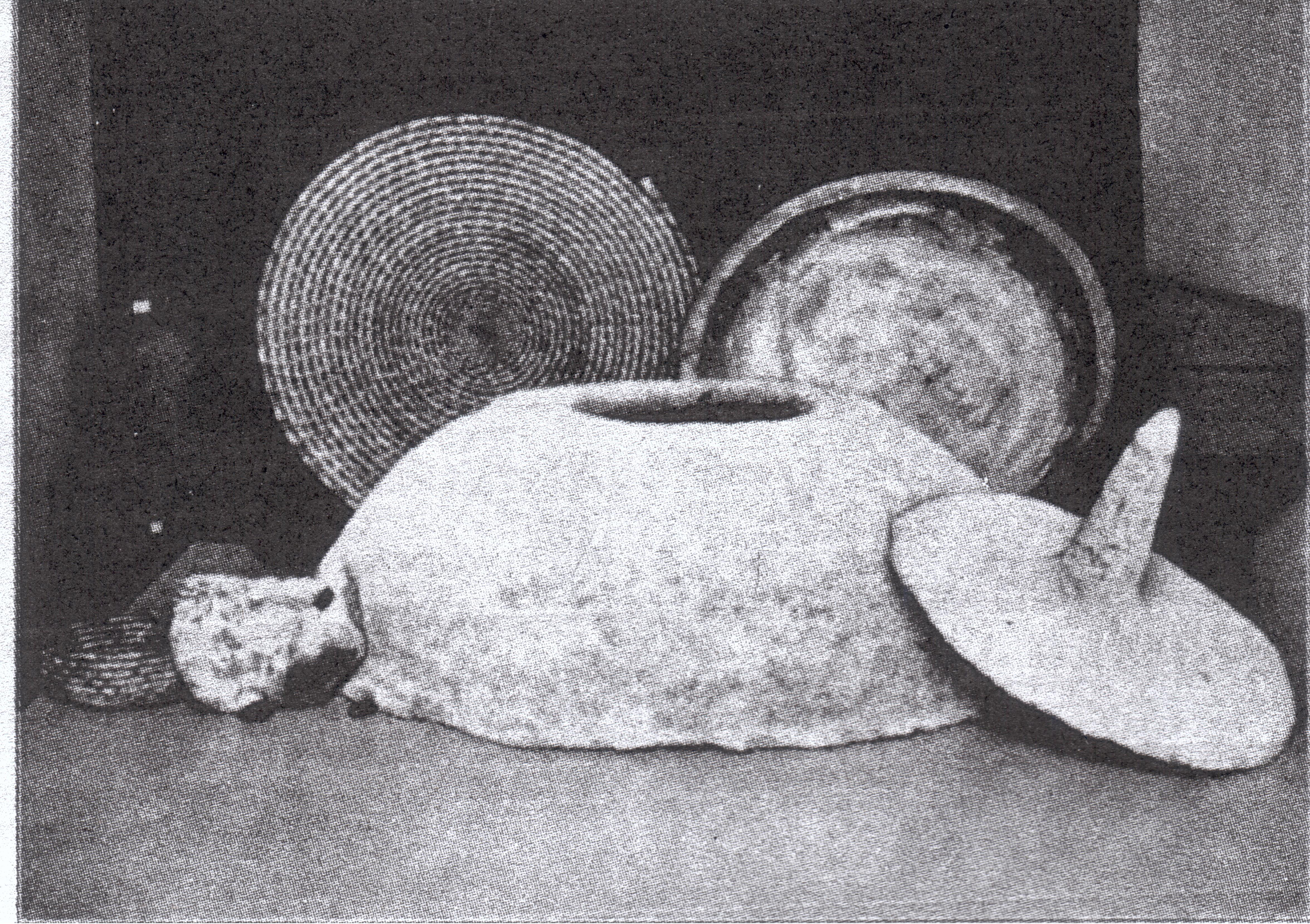
Tabun oven with lid, from Palestine (1935)

These smaller pot-shaped ovens are made of yellow pottery clay soil. The soil is wetted and made into a thick clay mixed with chopped stubble and straw from harvested wheat. The clay is hand-formed to make the dome-shaped shell. It is about 76 centimetres (30 in) to 101 centimetres (40 in) in diameter at its base, about 38 centimetres (15 in) to 51 centimetres (20 in) high, with an open top, approximately 38 centimetres (15 in) in diameter. The shell wall is about 2.55 centimetres (1.00 in) to 5.08 centimetres (2.00 in) thick. The shell is sun baked for weeks, before it is fired.

Some clay ovens were made higher and cylindrical with a wide-open top. The inner-most layer of the clay oven consists of about 2 parts of sand to 1 part clay, thoroughly mixed together. Such ovens were made with thick walls, as much as 15.24 centimetres (6.00 in), by adding to its outer shell and wall a cob of wet clay (or black earth) consisting of an aggregate of dried and burnt donkey or horse manure ground to a powdery ash (about 40%), a smaller portion of chopped straw and stubble, along with lime and sand or gravel. Others had a practice of adding burnt clay, ground pieces of terracotta or an admixture of clay and charcoal. This application was followed by an outer coating of clay, which was then smoothed out across the entire surface of the oven. Some reinforced the oven by inserting small stones and pebbles in the clay surrounding the oven. The process of thickening the walls helped to retain the oven's heat once it had been fired. Where clay ovens were made in a conical shape, they usually did not require the construction of a flue pipe. The wide side-opening served as a place of intake of air (oxygen), allowing for proper combustion of fuel, besides being a place for the egress of air and smoke. Other clay ovens that had, both, a top opening and bottom side-opening ("eye of the oven"), the function of the side-opening was to insert fuel and to remove excess ashes.

All newly built clay-ovens require a first firing before they can be used to bake bread. Firing was done by burning dried manure inside the oven. This is done, not only to harden the clay and to enable dough to cling to the inner oven-wall after its second firing, but also to temper the oven so that it can better retain heat. The thickness of the oven wall (ca. 6 inches) helps preserve residual heat. As a modern-day improvisation, some baking ovens are made from a half-cut metal barrel that encloses a thinly-made clay oven of the same height, and where the intermediate space between the metal barrel and clay oven is filled with sand.

== See also ==
- Horno
- Kitchen stove
- List of ovens
- Taboon bread
- Tabun oven
- Tandoor
- Tandoor bread
- Wood-fired oven

== Bibliography ==
- ʻArrāf, Shukrī [in Arabic] (1993). Sāmī Marʻī (ed.). Earth, Man and Effort: A Study of Our Material Civilization on Our Land (الارض، الأنسان والجهد : دراسة لحضارتنا المادية على ارضنا ) (in Arabic) (2 ed.). Ma’alot (Israel): Makhoul Brothers Press. OCLC 233144776.
- Cubberley, A.L.; Lloyd, J.A.; Roberts (1988). "Testa and Clibani: The Baking Covers of Classical Italy". Papers of the British School at Rome. 56. British School at Rome: 98–119. doi:10.1017/S0068246200009570. JSTOR 40310885. S2CID 162321943.(subscription required)
- Dalman, Gustaf (1964) [1935]. de:Arbeit und Sitte in Palästina [Work and Customs in Palestine] (in German). Vol. 4 (Bread, oil and wine). Hildesheim. OCLC 312676221.
  - Dalman, Gustaf (2020) [1935]. Nadia Abdulhadi-Sukhtian (ed.). Work and Customs in Palestine. Vol. II. Translated by Robert Schick. Ramallah: Dar Al Nasher. p. 164. ISBN 978-9950-385-84-9.
- Danby, H., ed. (1933), The Mishnah, Oxford: Oxford University Press, ISBN 0-19-815402-X
- Hai Gaon (1924), "Hai Gaon's Commentary on Seder Taharot", in Epstein, J.N. (ed.), The Geonic Commentary on Seder Taharot - Attributed to Rabbi Hai Gaon (in Hebrew), vol. 2, Berlin: Itzkowski, OCLC 13977130 (Available online, at HebrewBooks.org: The Geonic Commentary on Seder Taharot - vol. 2)
- Jastrow, M., ed. (2006), Dictionary of the Targumim, the Talmud Babli and Yerushalmi, and the Midrashic Literature, Peabody, Mass.: Hendrickson Publishers, p. 1147, OCLC 614562238, s.v. פורני
- Maimonides (1967). Mishnah, with Maimonides' Commentary (in Hebrew). Vol. 3. Translated by Yosef Qafih. Jerusalem: Mossad Harav Kook. OCLC 741081810.
- Mizrachi, Avshalom [in Hebrew] (2018), "The Yemenite Cuisine", in Rachel Yedid; Danny Bar-Maoz (eds.), Ascending the Palm Tree: An Anthology of the Yemenite Jewish Heritage (2018 ed.), Rehovot: E'ele BeTamar, p. 131, OCLC 1041776317 [first published in Bat-Teman, Shalom Seri (editor), Tel-Aviv 1993, p. 96 (in Hebrew)]
- Mukaddasi (1886). Le Strange, G. (ed.). Description of Syria, including Palestine. London: Palestine Pilgrims' Text Society.
- Mulder-Heymans, Noor (2002). "Archaeology, experimental archaeology and ethnoarchaeology on bread ovens in Syria". Civilisations. 49 (1/2 (Bread, Ovens and Hearths of the past)). Institut de Sociologie de l'Université de Bruxelles: 197–221. doi:10.4000/civilisations.1470. JSTOR 41229650.
- Nathan ben Abraham (1955), "Perush Shishah Sidrei Mishnah - A Commentary on the Six Orders of the Mishnah", in Sachs, Mordecai Yehudah Leib (ed.), The Six Orders of the Mishnah: with the Commentaries of the Rishonim (in Hebrew), Jerusalem: El ha-Meqorot, OCLC 233403923
- Negev, Avraham; Gibson, Shimon, eds. (2001). Bread and baking. New York and London: Continuum. pp. 91–92. ISBN 0-8264-1316-1. (Snippet view).
- Ovadiah di Bertinoro (1978). Commentary on 'Shisha Sidrei Mishnah' (in Hebrew). Vol. 3. Jerusalem: Eshkol. OCLC 233308344.
- Qafih, Y. (1982). Halichot Teman (Jewish Life in Sanà) (in Hebrew). Jerusalem: Ben-Zvi Institute. ISBN 965-17-0137-4. OCLC 863513860.
- Rathjens, Carl (1957). Jewish Domestic Architecture in San'a, Yemen. Jerusalem: The Israel Oriental Society, affiliate of the Hebrew University. pp. 25, 59. OCLC 48323774.
- Saleh, Y. (1979). Questions & Responsa Pe'ulath Ṣadīq (ספר שו"ת פעולת צדיק) (in Hebrew). Vol. 1–2 (Part II, responsum # 256) (2nd ed.). Jerusalem. pp. 262–263. OCLC 122773689.
