= Duqqa =

Egyptian condiment

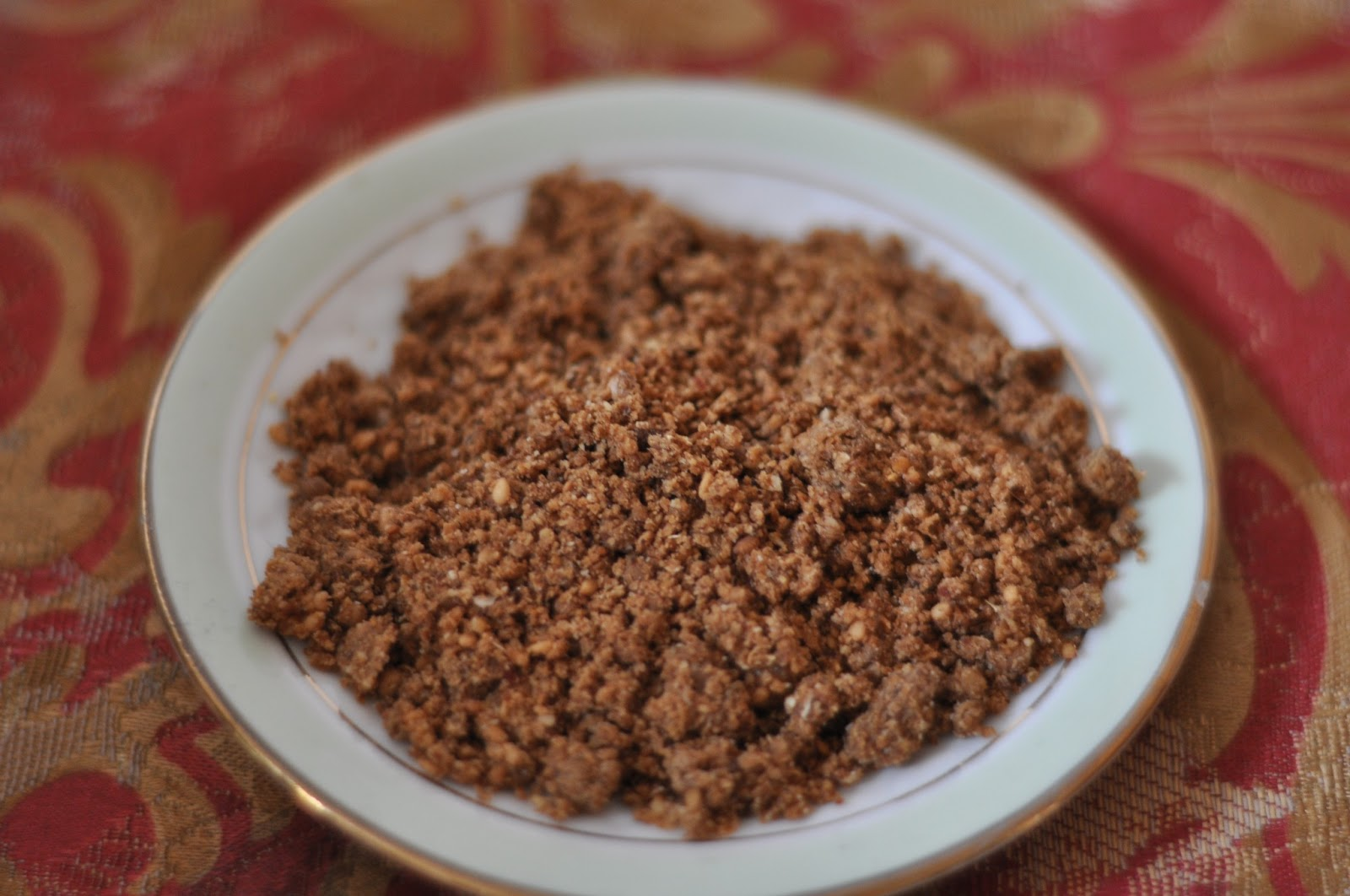
- Type: Dip
- Course: Side dish or hors d'œuvre
- Place of origin: Egypt
- Region or state: Egypt and Middle East
- Main ingredients: Herbs, nuts (usually hazelnut), spices

Duqqa, dukka, (Note: Also spelled: dakka, dukkah, dukka) du'ah, do'a, or dukkah (Arabic: دُقَّة, romanized: duqqa, Egyptian Arabic pronunciation: [ˈdæʔʔæ], Hejazi Arabic pronunciation: [dʊgga]) is an Egyptian and Middle Eastern condiment consisting of a mixture of herbs, nuts (usually hazelnut), and spices. It is typically used as a dip with bread or fresh vegetables for an hors d'œuvre.

Pre-made versions of duqqa can be bought in the spice markets of Cairo, where they are sold in paper cones, with the simplest version being crushed mint, salt, and pepper. The packaged variety that is found in markets is composed of parched wheat flour mixed with cumin and caraway. In the Hejaz region, it has been part of the regional cuisine for decades.

== Etymology ==
The word is derived from the Arabic for 'to pound' since the mixture of spices and nuts is pounded together after being dry-roasted to a texture that is neither powdered nor paste-like.

== History ==
Orientalist Edward William Lane's 1860 texts described dukkah as follows:

A meal is often made by those who cannot afford luxuries of bread and a mixture called dukkah, which is commonly composed of salt and pepper with za’atar or wild marjoram or mint or cumin-seed, and with one or more, or all, of the following ingredients – namely, coriander seed, cinnamon, sesame, and hummus (or chick peas). Each mouthful of bread is dipped in this mixture"

In 1895, author Socrates Spiro described duqqa as "ground spices eaten with bread (by the poor) [sic]" in his Egyptian Arabic to English dictionary.

== Ingredients ==
The actual composition of the spice mix can vary among families and vendors, though there are common ingredients such as sesame, coriander, cumin, salt and black pepper. A report from 1978 indicates that even further ingredients can be used, such as nigella, millet flour and dried cheese. Some modern variants include pine nuts, pumpkin seeds or sunflower seeds.

== By region ==
=== Gaza Strip ===
Gazan duqqa typically contains dill seeds and chile flakes, both common ingredients in that region. It's a common food in Gaza, and its popularity is attributed to its low cost, its ingredients vary depending on their availability. It is a common topping for manakish.

== Gallery ==
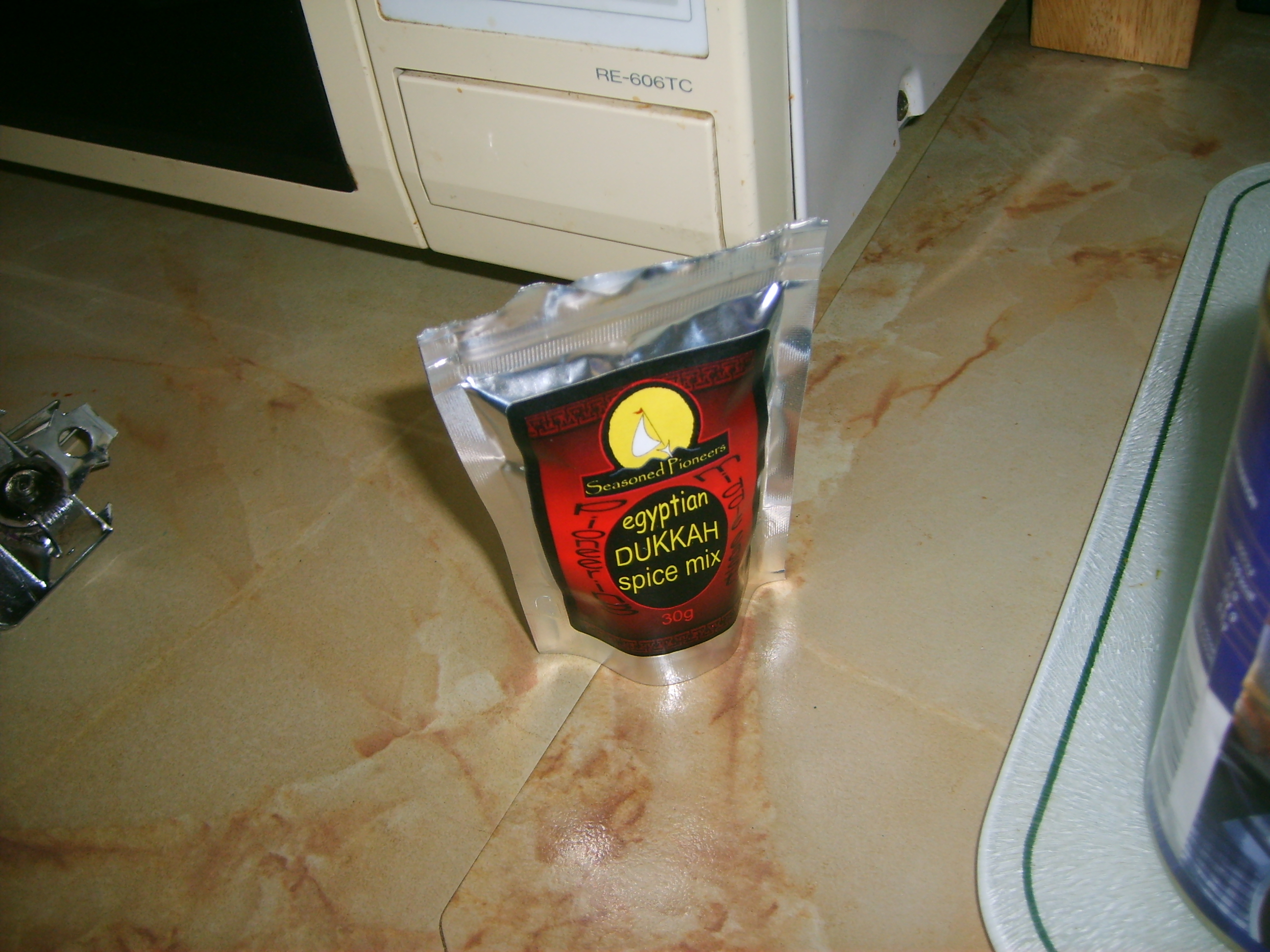
Egyptian packaged duqqa

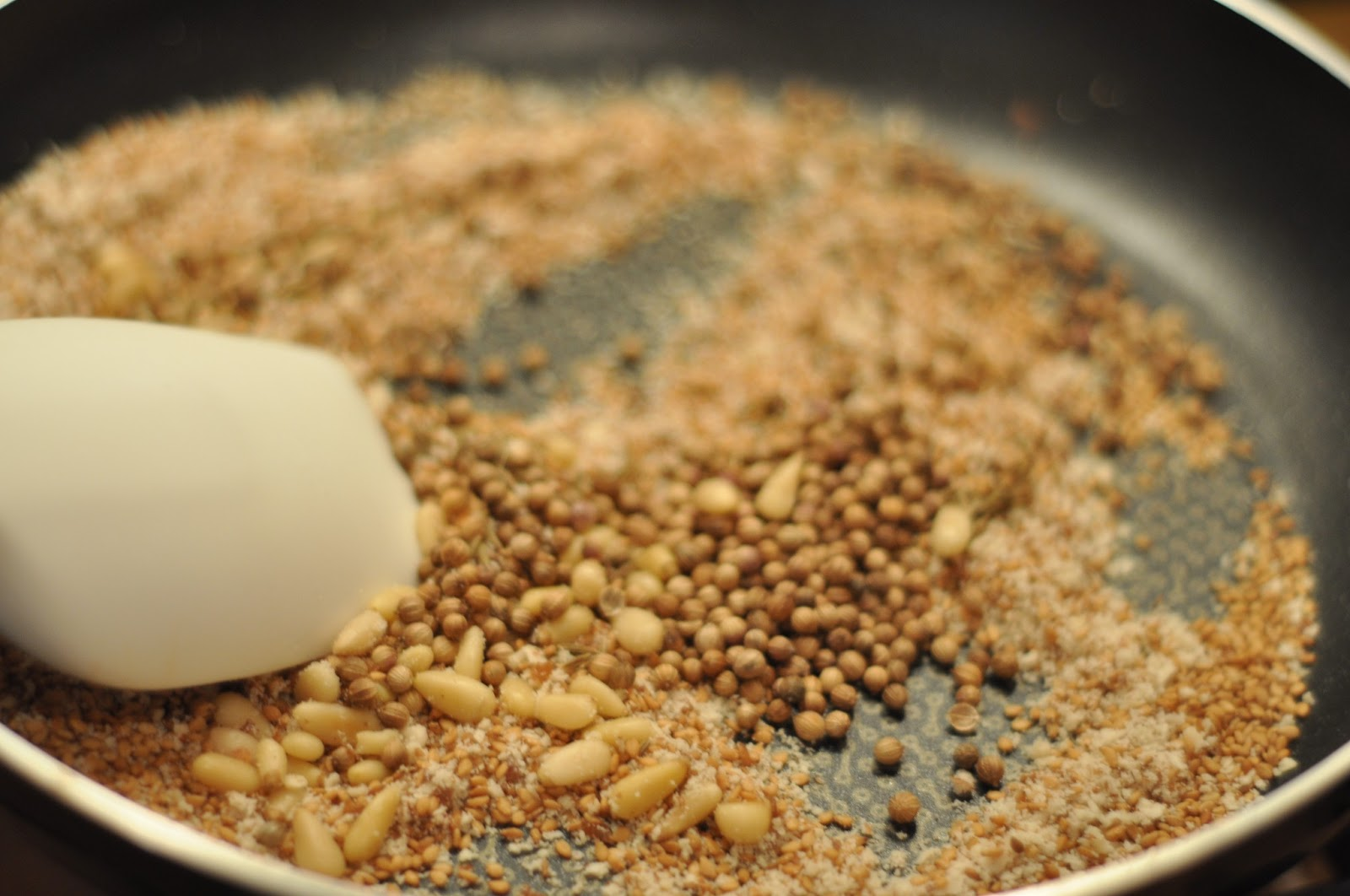
Coriander seeds and pine nuts being added to a duqqa mixture

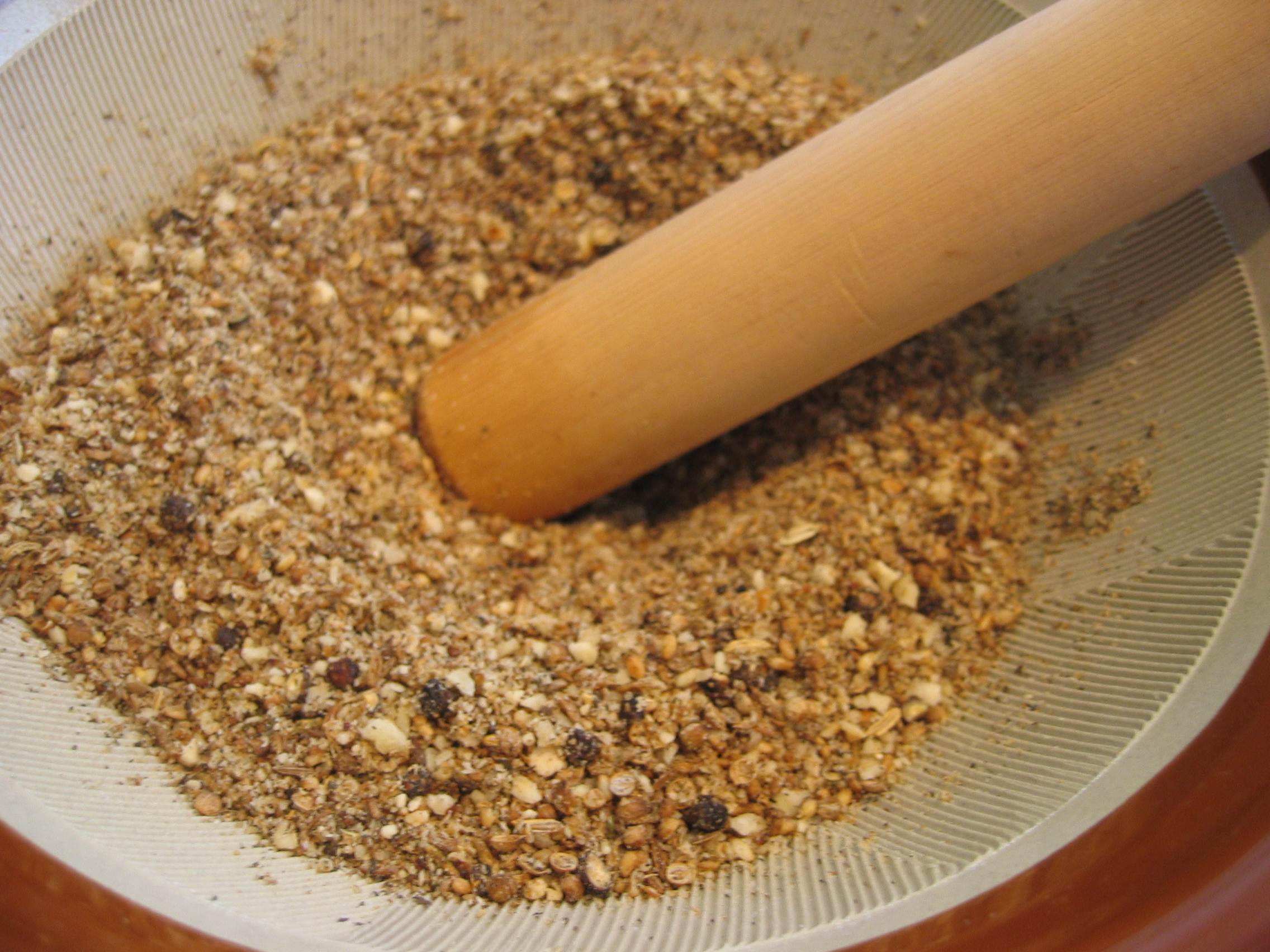
Duqqa prepared in mortar and pestle

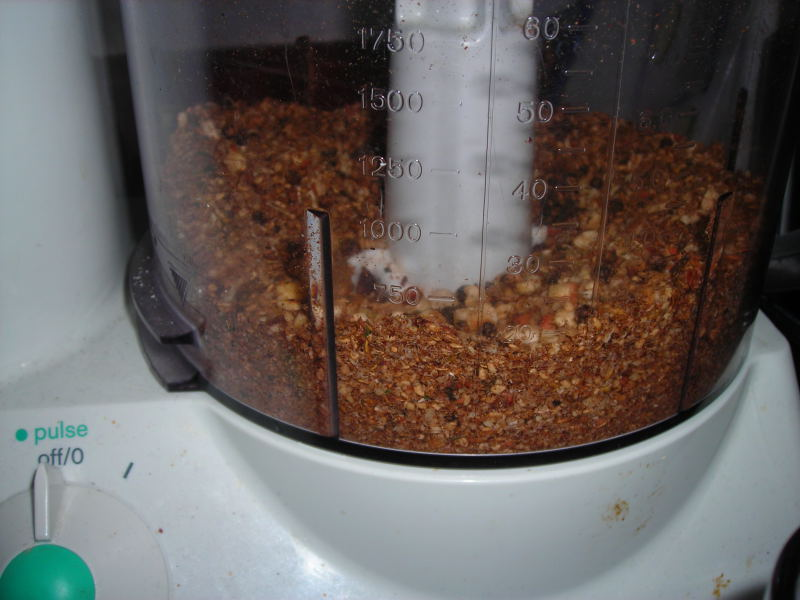
Duqqa prepared in a food processor

== See also ==
- List of Middle Eastern dishes
- List of African dishes
- Charoset
