= Lahmacun =

Middle Eastern flatbread with minced meat

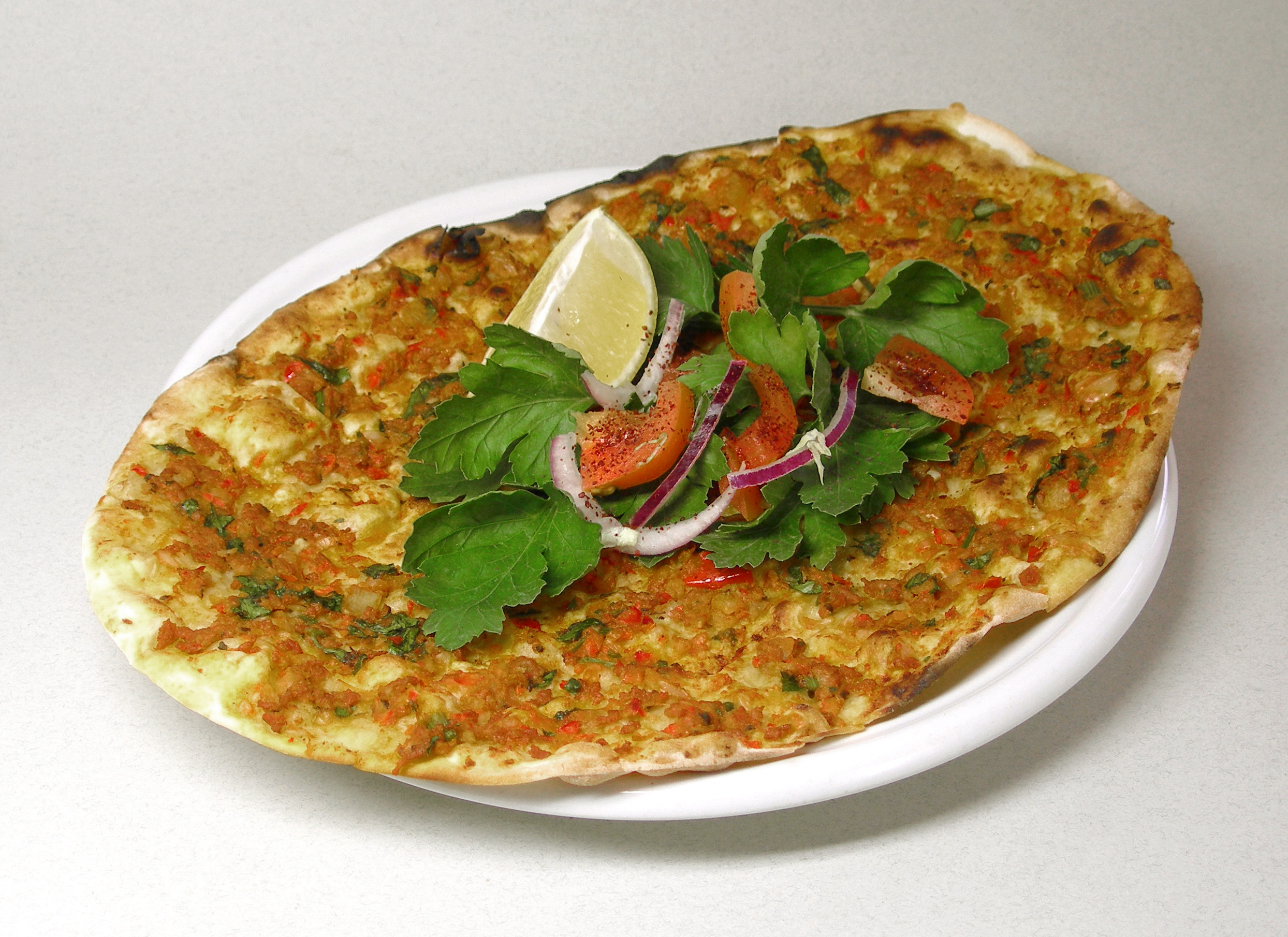
- Lahmacun with salad
- Alternative names: Lahmadjoune, Lahmajun, lahmajoun, lahm b'ajin, lahmajo, lahmajin, lahamagine, lahmatzoun
- Course: Main
- Region or state: Levant
- Serving temperature: Warm
- Main ingredients: Wheat flour, minced meat, vegetables and herbs

Lahmacun, (Note: /ˌlɑːməˈdʒuːn/ LAH-mə-JOON, Turkish: [lahmaːˈdʒun]; Arabic: لحم بعجين, romanized: laḥm bi-ʿajīn, lit. 'meat with dough'.) lahmajun, or lahmajo (Note: Armenian: լահմաջո.) is a Middle Eastern flatbread topped with minced meat (most commonly beef or lamb), minced vegetables, and herbs such as onions, garlic, tomatoes, red peppers, and parsley, flavored with spices such as chili pepper and paprika, then baked. Lahmacun is often wrapped around vegetables, including pickled vegetables, tomatoes, peppers, onions, lettuce, parsley, and roasted eggplant.

It originated in the Levant region of West Asia and the earliest known written evidence of its existence come from medieval Syria where it is traditionally known by its Arabic name lahm bi ʿajīn ("meat with dough"). Lahm bi ajeen, or lahmacun is a popular dish in Lebanon and Syria.

Variants of lahmacun are also common in Armenia and Turkey, where the dish became popular in local cuisines. In English, it is sometimes referred to as "Lebanese pizza", "Armenian pizza", or "Turkish pizza", because of its round shape and superficial similarity to pizza, though it traditionally contains neither cheese nor tomato sauce and is made with a thinner crust.

== Etymology and terminology ==
The name had entered English from Turkish lahmacun, pronounced lahmajun, and from Armenian լահմաջո (lahmajo), both derived from Arabic لحم [بـ]عجين (laḥm [bi-]ʿajīn), meaning "dough [with] meat". The names lahmajin and sfiha are often used interchangeably to refer to certain foods.

The word lahmacun is attested in explorer Evliya Çelebi's Seyahatnâme a travelogue from the 17th century, according to Sevan Nişanyan, it is the oldest Turkish-language use of the word.

== History ==
=== Medieval Syria ===
Flatbreads in the Middle East have been cooked in tandoors and on metal frying pans such as the tava for thousands of years. They have been used to wrap meat and other foods for convenience and portability. However, until the wider adoption in medieval times of the large stone ovens, flatbreads stuffed or topped with meat and other foods were not baked together, cooking the bread and the topping at the same time. The earliest known written evidence closely corresponding to laḥm bi-ʿajīn (lahmacun) comes from medieval Syrian culinary literature.

A 13th-century Syrian cookbook compiled in Aleppo, Kitāb al-Wusla ilā al-Ḥabīb (Scents and Flavors), contains a recipe describing minced meat spread on thin dough and baked in a brick oven (furn). It instructs to “cut up meat small, then spread it on a round piece of dough and bake it in the oven.” This recipe is identified by scholars as the earliest textual reference to laḥm bi ʿajīn (“meat with dough”).

=== Ottoman period ===
The 17th-century Ottoman traveler Evliya Çelebi also notices the dish for the first time in Syria, Damascus, he listed lahm-ı acîn among the notable foods of Damascus. This Ottoman reference records the name of the dish in a Syrian context several centuries after the earlier Aleppine cookbook tradition. He listed it among the praised foods of the city in his Seyahatname. In his book, Çelebi warns that a man who falls off his horse will become "a paste like lahm-ı acîn (lahmacun)".

An 1844 French–Arabic dictionary of Syrian and Egyptian Arabic by the Swedish orientalist Jacob Berggren defines lahm el-ʿajin (لحم العجين) as small baked pastries filled with minced meat, and mixed with sour milk or pomegranate juice before being cooked in an oven. 2 recipes for lahma bi-ajin can be found in the 1885 cookbook titled Ustadh al-Tabbakhin by Lebanese writer Khalil Khattar Sarkis, along with a recipe for meat-filled fatayer.

=== Twentieth-century spread ===
==== Turkey ====
Before becoming widespread throughout Turkey, lahmacun was primarily associated with the southern and southeastern regions of the country, particularly around Urfa and Gaziantep, as well as with Arab countries. Multiple studies state that lahmacun did not become widespread throughout Turkey until its introduction to Istanbul in the 1950s. Before that period, it was largely confined within Turkey to the southeast, a region with significant interaction with Arab culture and cuisine.

According to Bal, migrants from southeastern Turkey brought lahmacun to Istanbul during the mid-20th century, contributing to its spread in the city and subsequently elsewhere in Turkey. Anthropologist Ayfer Suna Bartu similarly recorded an Istanbul informant recalling that fifty years earlier nobody in Istanbul knew what lahmacun was, or that it had instead been called pizza.

Lahmacun subsequently became a widely consumed dish in Turkey, while regional varieties remained particularly associated with southeastern Anatolia. In 2025, the European Union registered Antep Lahmacunu / Gaziantep Lahmacunu as a protected geographical indication (PGI).

==== Armenia ====
Lahmajo (the Armenian name for lahm bi 'ajin) became established in Armenia during the Soviet period through Armenian repatriation from the Middle East. The dish was introduced to Yerevan in the 1960s by Armenian repatriates from Aleppo, Syria. Following the Second World War, around 90,000 diaspora Armenians, particularly from Lebanon, Iran, Egypt and Syria, settled in Armenia. Their food traditions contributed to Soviet Armenian cuisine, including lahmajo. In the 1960s, lahmajo was associated with the new wave of repatriates and was referred to by locals as an "akhpar meal", a term used for diaspora Armenian repatriates. It was initially regarded as foreign to local cuisine before becoming incorporated into Armenian food culture.

A variety of such dishes exist such as sfiha and manakish, became popular in Levant, such as Lebanon, Palestine, Jordan and Syria. A thin flatbread, topped with spiced ground meat, became known as lahm b'ajin (meat with dough), shortened to lahmajin and similar names.

== Regional traditions ==
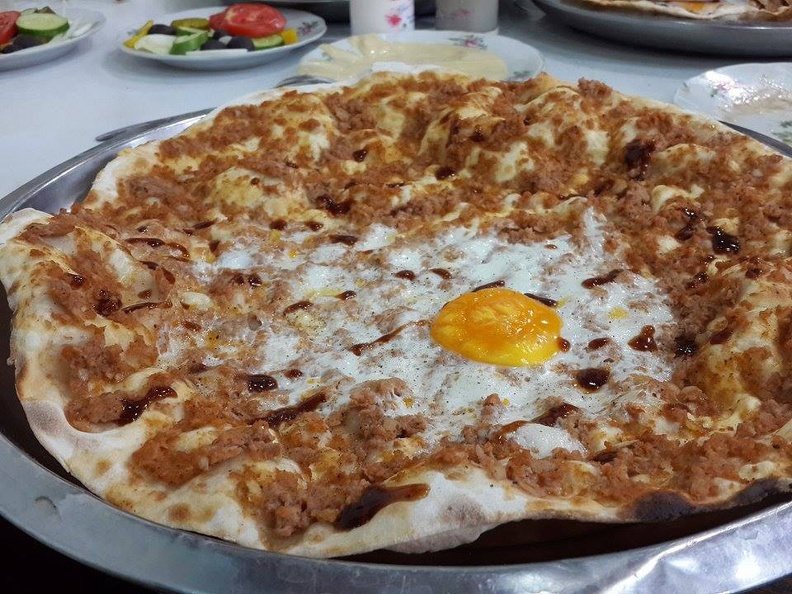
Lahmajin from Mosul

In Assyrian tradition, lahmacun is served to those who are grieving the loss of a loved one, alongside coffee and other dishes. In Mosul, Iraq, lahmajin is a common food served at any time of day.

In The Netherlands lahmacun is often sold as a street food or snack, often under the name Turkish pizza. The lahmacun is rolled up and filled with salad, sambal and garlic sauce, often with added döner meat and/or cheese.

=== Variations ===
- Antep, includes garlic
- Urfa, includes onion
- Aleppo (Arabic: لحم بعجين من حلب; Turkish: Halep işi lahmacun), includes garlic, onion, and pomegranate molasses
- ʻUsh al-bulbul (Arabic: عش البلبل, not to be confused with bulbul yuvasi) is an Aleppan smaller variety with thicker dough.

== Controversy ==
Due to the hostile nature of the relations between Armenia and Turkey, the opening of Armenian restaurants serving the food in Russia was met by some protests. In March 2020, Kim Kardashian, an American socialite and media personality of Armenian heritage, posted a video on her Instagram saying "Who knows about lahmacun? This is our Armenian pizza. My dad would always put string cheese on it and then put it in the oven and get it really crispy." This sparked outrage among Turkish social media users, who lashed out at her for describing lahmacun as Armenian pizza.

== See also ==
- Sfiha
- Pizza marinara
- Al-Maltout
