= Iranian pizza =

Style of pizza served in Iran and the Iranian diaspora

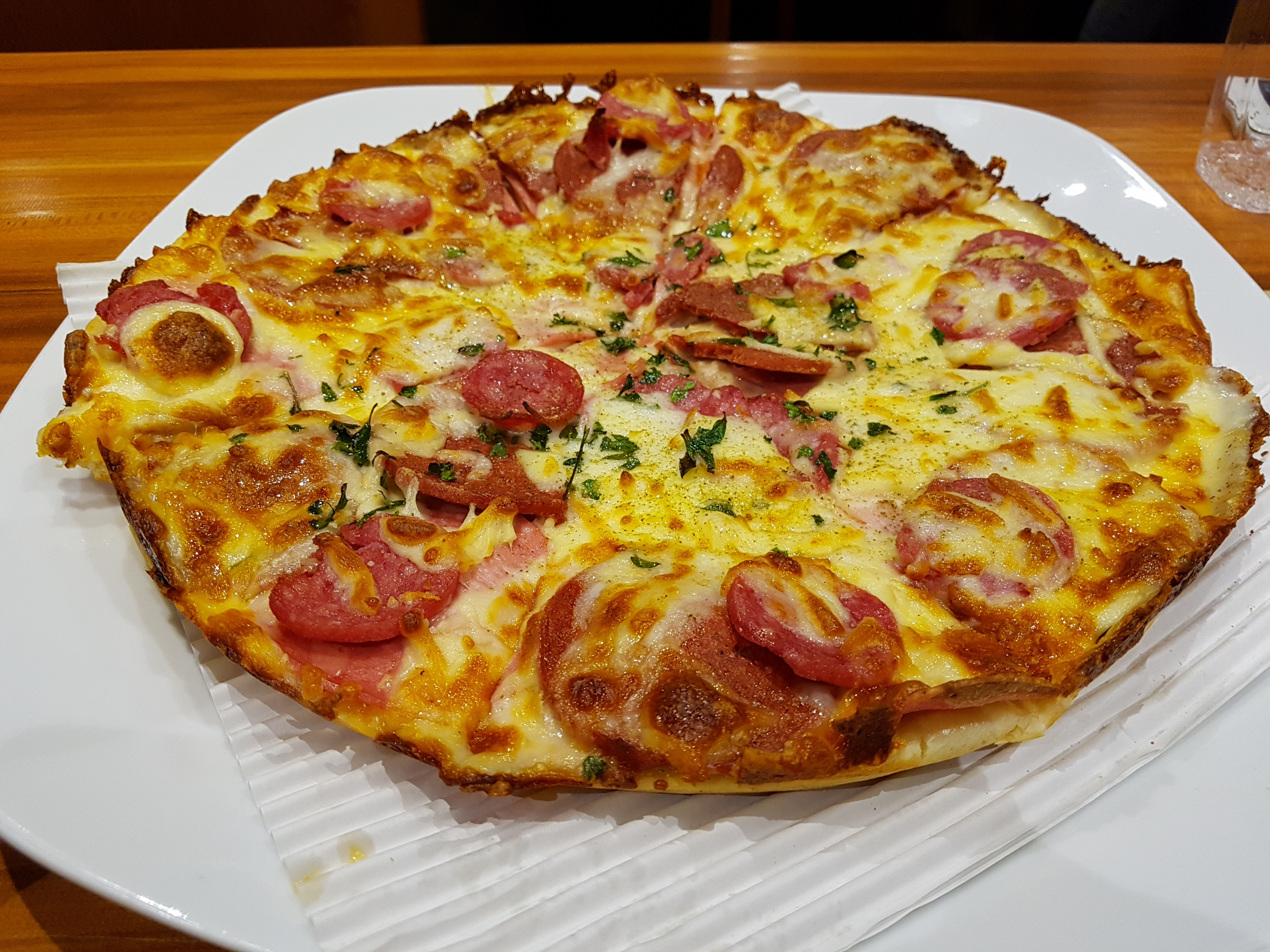
- An Iranian-style special pizza (makhsoos)
- Alternative names: Persian pizza
- Type: Pizza
- Place of origin: Iran, Iranian diaspora
- Main ingredients: Pizza dough, cheese, tomato sauce, Persian spices
- Variations: Iranian-style toppings, lacking base sauce.

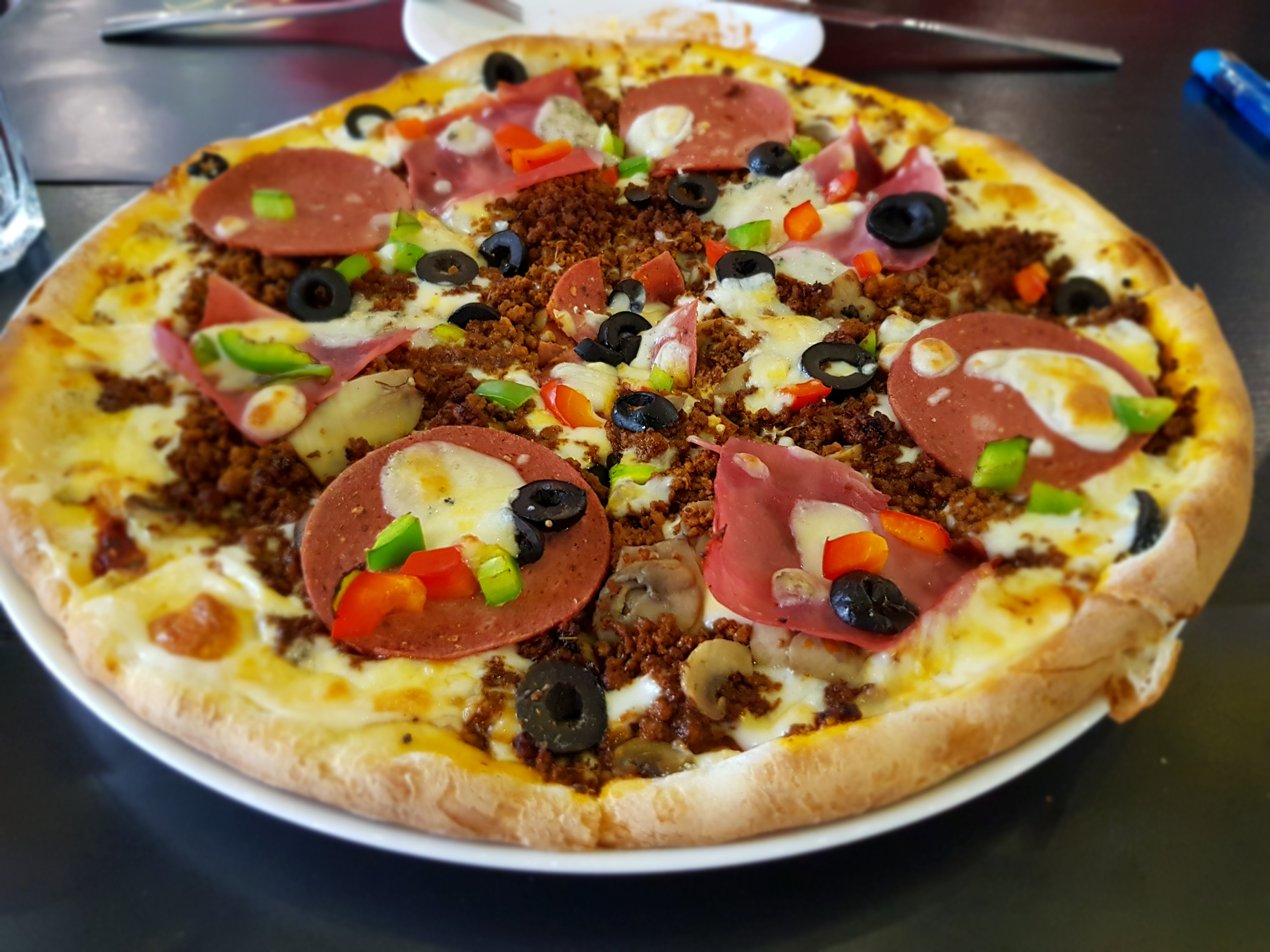
Persian-style mixed pizza (makhloot)

Iranian pizza (Persian: پیتزای ایرانی) also known as Persian pizza refers to the various styles of pizza and its preparation rather than its toppings. It is characterized by its thick bread and large amounts of cheese. Iranian pizza is served in Iran and places affected by the Iranian diaspora. It is usually made with minced meat, beef sausage, bell pepper, mushroom, mozzarella cheese, and Persian spices.

== History ==
Pizza-like foods date back to the 6th century BC, where Persian soldiers serving under Darius the Great baked flatbreads with cheese and dates on top of their battle shields.

== Style ==
Persian pizza has a unique taste because of the variety of the ingredients used in it. Iranian/Persian pizza can have a base that is thick or thin. Thin versions are imitations of Roman pizza with fewer toppings. However, the major characteristic of traditional Persian Pizza is the abundance of the toppings which usually include a mixture of different type of meats, sausages, cold cuts, vegetables (especially bell pepper, mushroom and white onion) covered with thick layer of panir-e-pizza (pizza cheese) which is usually spread over a hand-made dough with a medium thickness.

Almost every Persian pizzeria offers major Persian Pizza varieties: Makhloot (Mixed: Ground beef, different types of sausage, mushroom, bell pepper and onion) and Makhsoos (Special: same ingredients as Makhloot without the ground beef) pizzas. Recently chicken pizza varieties (e.g. Chicken Pesto, BBQ Chicken) and vegetable pizza (bell pepper, mushroom, corn, tomato, etc.) have become popular. Major spices that are used in Persian Style pizza are Avishan (Oregano), Red pepper powder, black pepper, and Dried Garlic Powder.

Some pizzerias in Tehran serve Iranian pizza without tomato-based sauce. In that case, unlike Italian pizzerias, ketchup is widely used as a must-have condiment.

== See also ==
- Iranian cuisine
- Fast food industry
- Pizza in the United States
- List of pizza varieties by country
- Manakish
