= Musakhan =

Palestinian bread and chicken dish

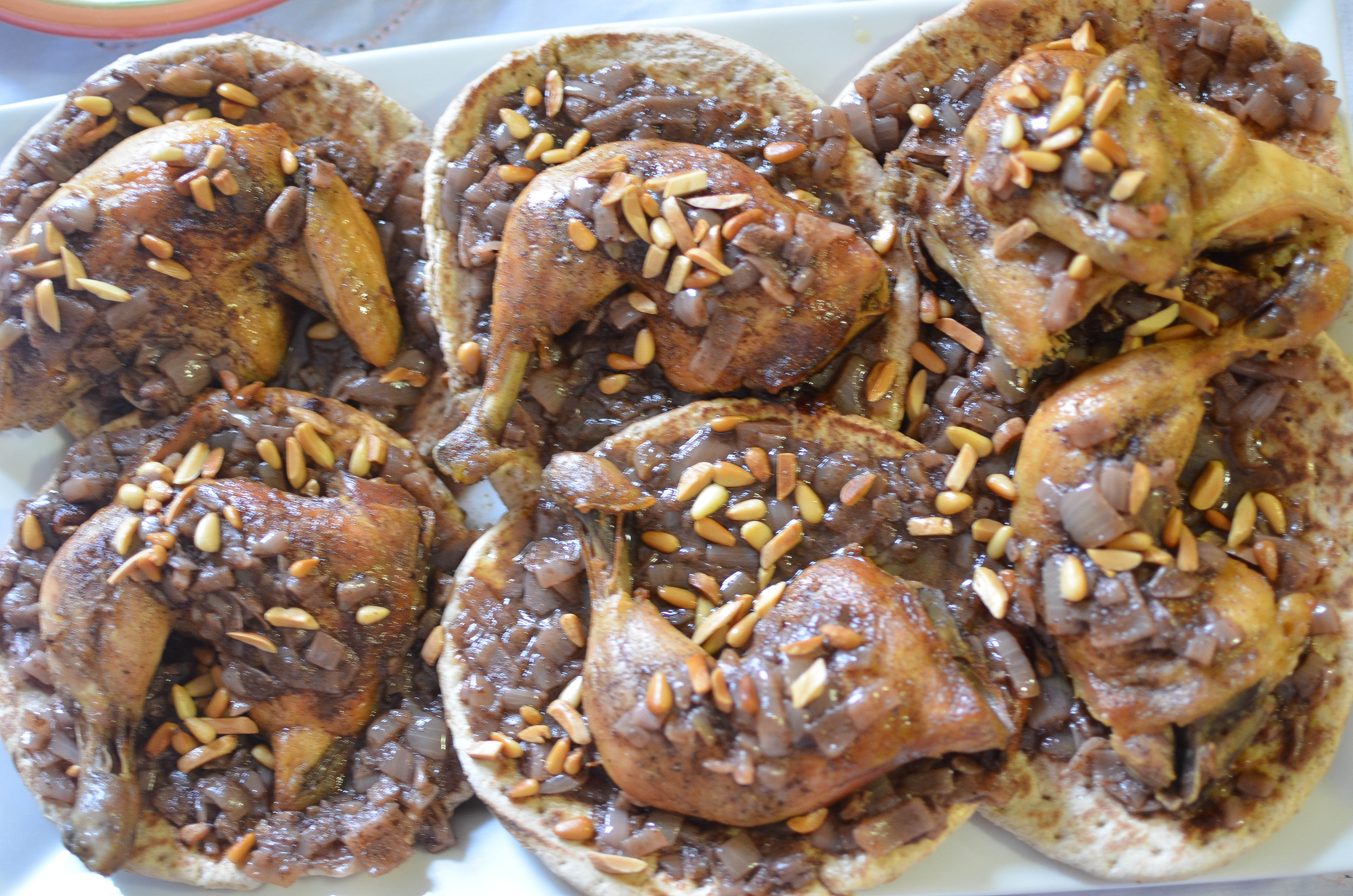
- Course: Meal
- Place of origin: Palestine
- Region or state: Levant
- Associated cuisine: Palestinian, Levantine
- Main ingredients: Chicken, sumac, onion, taboon bread, olive oil

Musakhan (Arabic: مسخّن, lit. 'something that is [re]heated'), also known as muhammar (Arabic: محمّر, lit. 'reddened'), is a Palestinian dish composed of roasted chicken baked with onions, sumac, allspice, saffron, and fried pine nuts served over taboon bread. Originating in the Tulkarm and Jenin area, musakhan is often considered the national dish of Palestine. The dish is particularly popular among Palestinians and Jordanians. It is also eaten by Druze in the Galilee, especially around Iksal and Sandala, and in the Triangle. The dish can be found in Syria, Lebanon, and Jordan as well. The dish owes its name to the practice of Palestinian farmers reheating old taboon bread and make it taste better. Musakhan is traditionally cooked during the olive harvest season.

== History ==
The exact origin of the dish is unclear; references to it are found in Palestinian folk songs from the 19th-century.

Some sources state that the dish was created by mistake, where in communal ovens that were dug into the ground, ingredients like chicken and bread were frequently placed next to one another to cook simultaneously, and eventually came to be placed on top of one another.

Different versions of the dish have existed for 150 years.

== Preparation ==
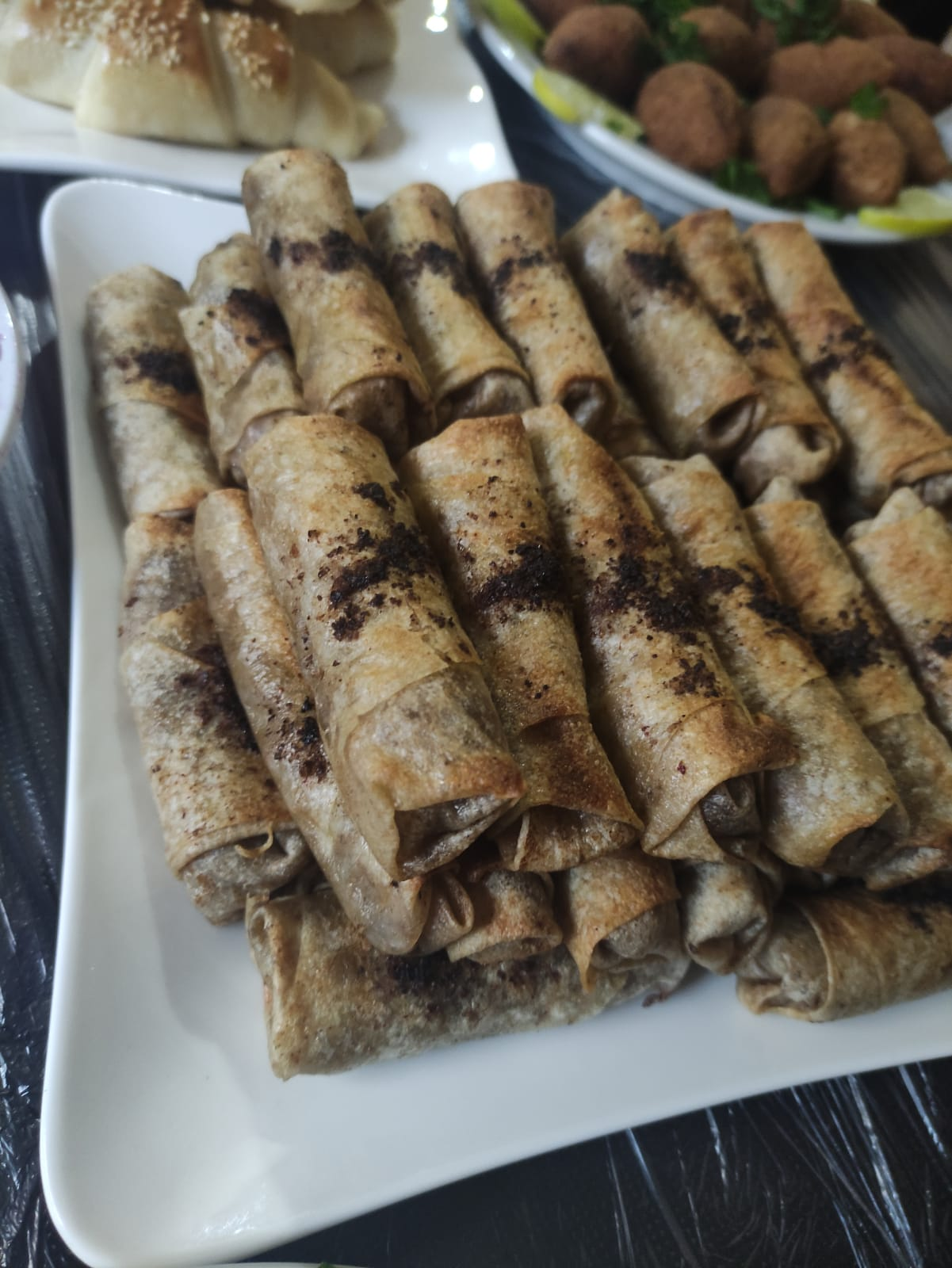
Musakhan rolls

Musakhan is simple to make and the ingredients needed are easily obtainable, which may account for the dish's popularity. Many of the ingredients used—olive oil, sumac and pine nuts—are staples of Palestinian cuisine. The dish is typically eaten with one's hands. It is usually presented with the chicken on top of the bread, and could be served with soup.

Some contemporary versions will shape the dish into rolls rather than the traditional layered setup, with thin saj bread instead of the much thicker taboon bread, other contemporary versions make it into a fatteh.

== World records ==
On April 20, 2010, the largest ever dish of musakhan was prepared in Ramallah and was entered into the Guinness Book of World Records. Palestinian Prime Minister Salam Fayad described it as a great achievement and honor for the Palestinian people: "This great achievement completely depended on Palestinian products, mainly olive oil. It also has a cultural dimension and a Palestinian message to the world that they want their legitimate rights." The total diameter of the musakhan loaf was 4 meters, with a total weight of 1,350 kg. Forty Palestinian cooks made use of 250 kg of flour, 170 kg of olive oil, 500 kg of onions and 70 kg of almonds.

== See also ==
- Palestinian cuisine
- List of chicken dishes
- "Palestinian Chicken"
