= Maltout =

Traditional Palestinian bread

Al-Maltout
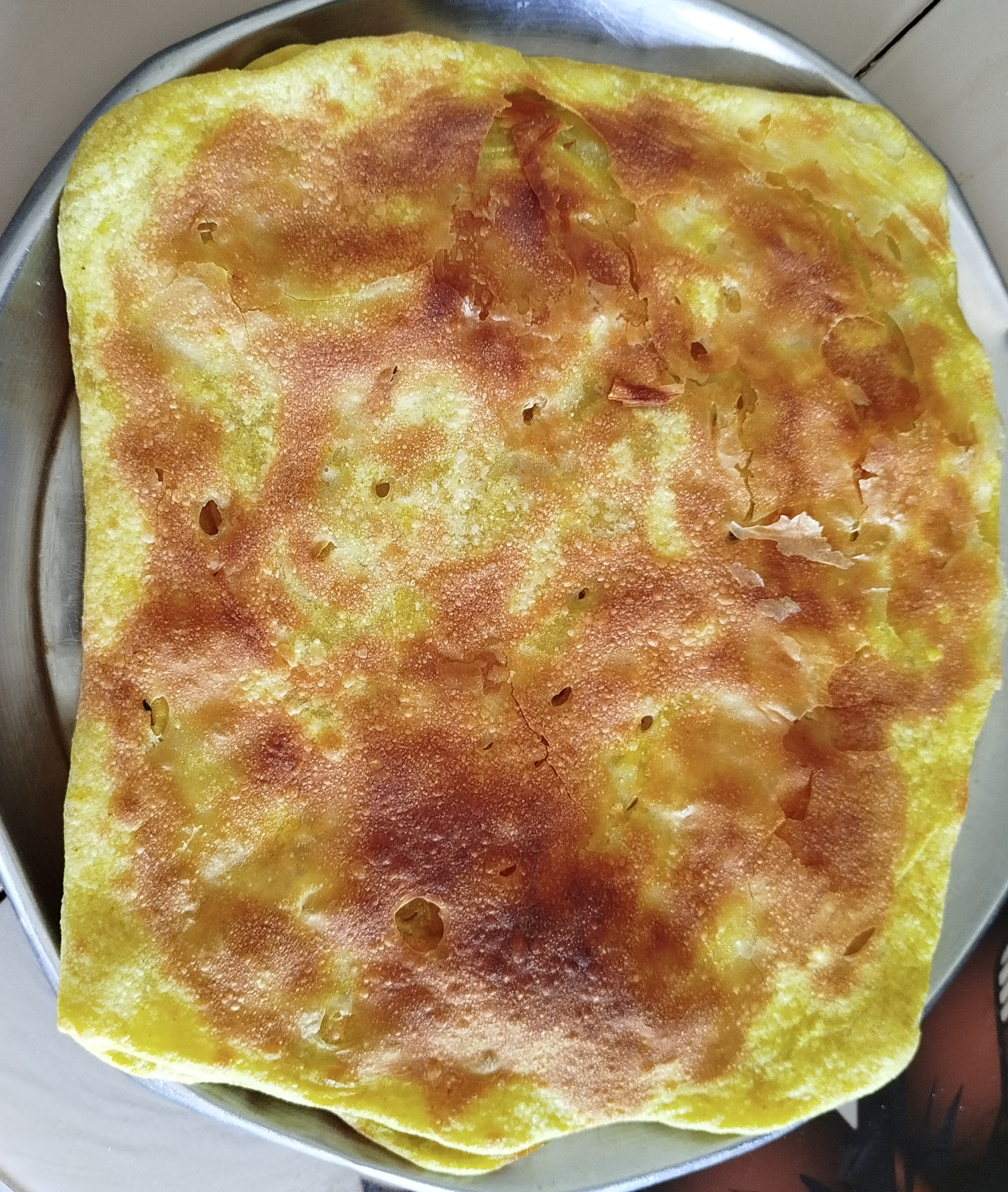
- Type: Bread
- Place of origin: Palestine

Maltout (Arabic: الملتوت) is a traditional Palestinian flatbread flavored with olive oil. Commonly associated with rural Palestinian cuisine, it is especially popular during the olive harvest season and is typically served warm for breakfast alongside za'atar, tea, or yogurt. It is traditionally prepared in a taboon oven. Its preparation is associated with communal farming traditions.

== Description ==
Maltout is made with white wheat flour, water, salt, turmeric, and extra virgin olive oil. The dough is layered, oiled, and baked in a traditional taboon oven or a home oven until golden and crispy.

== See also ==
- Culture of Palestine
- List of Palestinian dishes
- Palestinian cuisine
- Taboon bread
- Za'atar
- Arab cuisine
