= Makmoura =

Traditional Levantine dish

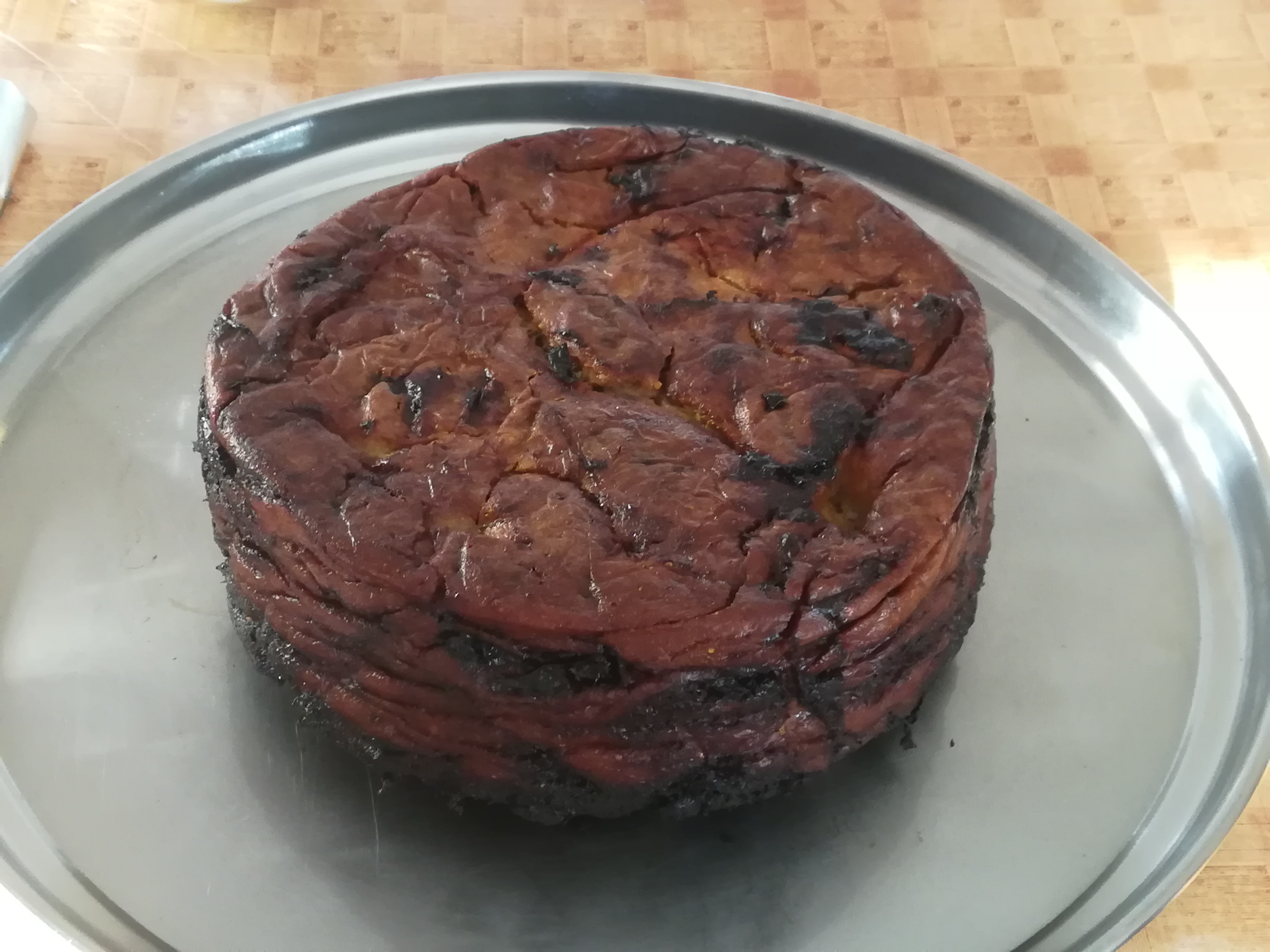
- Alternative names: Makmoora
- Place of origin: Hauran
- Associated cuisine: Jordanian, Syrian
- Main ingredients: Chicken, olive oil

Makmoura (Arabic: مكمورة, romanized: makmūrah) is a traditional Levantine dish associated with the Hauran region, which includes southern Syria as well as the rural areas of northern Jordan, including Ar-Ramtha, Huwwarah, and the villages surrounding Irbid.

This dish is commonly prepared for celebrations, family gatherings, and local festivals, and it has become an integral part of Irbid’s cultural identity.

Makmoura is primarily made from whole wheat flour, chicken or meat, olive oil, and generous quantities of finely chopped Onion. Makmoura was traditionally made to celebrate the olive harvest season, as it uses olive oil as a primary ingredient.

== Etymology ==
The word makmoura means "covered", it is derived from the Arabic root kamara (كَمَرَ), which means "to cover", it is the passive past participle (اسم مفعول) form of the verb.

== See also ==
- Mansaf, Jordan's national dish
- Musakhan, Palestinian onion, chicken and bread dish
- Shishbarak, Levantine meat and onion dumpling
- Musaqa'a
