= Jordanian cuisine =

Culinary traditions of Jordan

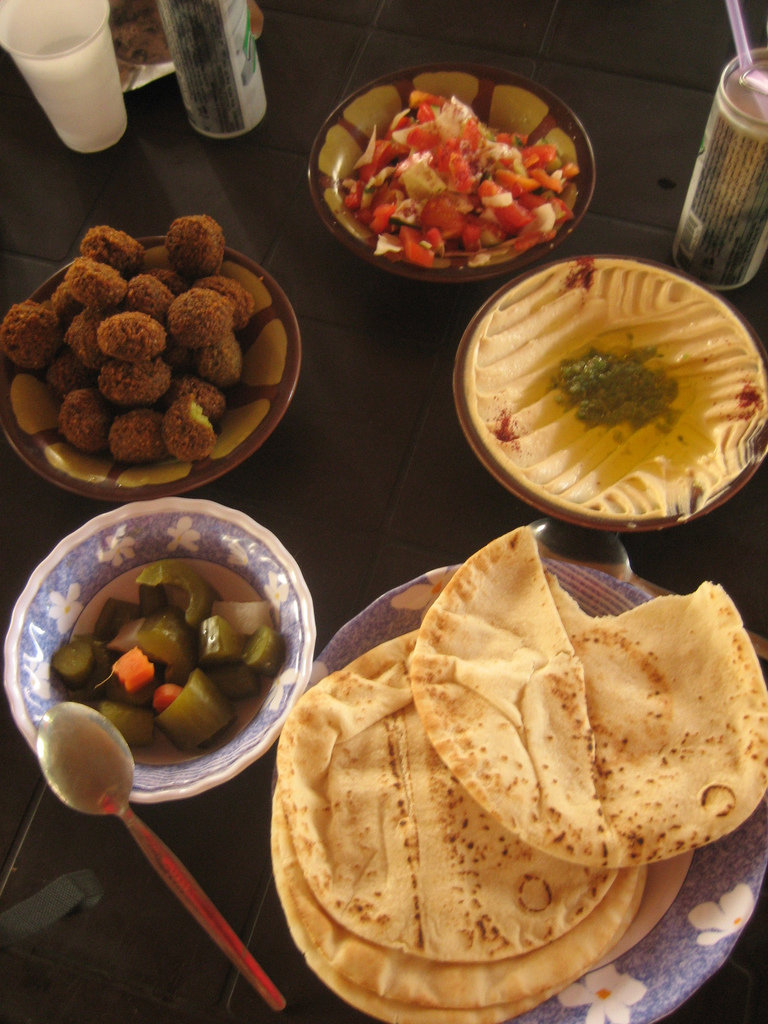
A typical Jordanian breakfast: hummus, falafel, salad, pickles and khubz (pita)

Jordanian cuisine is a Levantine cuisine developed over time in Jordan. Stuffed vegetables are common, with many different techniques employed in their preparation. Meat is an important component of Jordanian cuisine, most often lamb, beef and chicken but also goat and camel meat. Rice is frequently served as a side dish but there are also one-pot rice dishes such as maqloubah.

As one of the largest producers of olives in the world, olive oil is the main cooking oil by Jordanians and Jordan as a whole. Herbs, garlic, onion, tomato sauce, and lemon are typical flavors found in Jordan.

The blend of spices called za'atar contains a common local herb called sumac that grows wild in Jordan and is closely identified with Jordanian and other Middle Eastern countries.

Yogurt is commonly served alongside food and is a common ingredient itself; in particular, jameed, a form of dried yogurt is unique to Jordanian cuisine and a main ingredient in mansaf, the national dish of Jordan, and a symbol in Jordanian culture for generosity.

Another famous meat dish in Jordan is zarb. It is especially popular in areas inhabited by Bedouin tribes such as Petra and the desert of Wadi Rum where it is commonly served to tourists. Zarb is prepared in a submerged oven called a taboon, and is considered a delicacy. It consists of a selection of meat (usually chicken and lamb), vegetables (zucchini, eggplant, carrots, potatoes) and is served with rice and various meze, such as tabbouleh salad.

Internationally known foods which are common and popular everyday snacks in Jordan include hummus, which is a purée of chick peas blended with tahini, lemon, and garlic, and falafel, a deep-fried ball or patty made from ground chickpeas.

A typical mezze includes foods such as kibbeh, labaneh, baba ghanoush, tabbouleh, olives and pickles. Bread, rice, freekeh and bulgur all have a role in Jordanian cuisine.

Popular desserts include baklava, knafeh, halva and qatayef (a dish made specially for Ramadan), in addition to seasonal fruits such as watermelons, figs, and cactus pear which are served in summer.

Turkish coffee and tea flavored with mint or sage are almost ubiquitous in Jordan. Arabic coffee is also usually served on more formal occasions.

Arak, an aniseed flavoured spirit is also drunk with food.

Pork consumption in Jordan is negligible, with very modest amounts consumed per capita.

== Regional cuisines ==
Bedouins in eastern and southern Jordan tend to consume more lamb than the general population, whereas residents of Aqaba, Jordan's only coastal city, consume fresh seafood often.

== History ==
Jordanian cuisine is a part of Levantine cuisine and shares many traits and similarities with the cuisine of Lebanon, Palestine and Syria, often with some local variations. More generally Jordanian cuisine is influenced by historical connections to the cuisine of Turkey and the former Ottoman Empire. Jordanian cuisine is also influenced by the cuisines of groups who have made a home for themselves in modern Jordan, including Armenians, Circassians, Iraqis, Palestinians, and Syrians.

Food is a very important aspect of Jordanian culture. In villages, meals are a community event with immediate and extended family present. In addition, food is commonly used by Jordanians to express their hospitality and generosity. Jordanians serve family, friends, and guests with great pride in their homes, no matter how modest their means. A "Jordanian invitation" means that one is expected to bring nothing and eat everything.

Celebrations in Jordan are marked with dishes from Jordanian cuisine spread out and served to the guests. Customs such as weddings, birth of a child, funerals, birthdays and specific religious and national ceremonies such as Ramadan and Jordan's independence day all call for splendid food to be served to guests. To celebrate the birth of a child, karawiya, a caraway-flavoured pudding, is commonly served to guests.

== Jordanian culinary ==
=== Main dishes ===
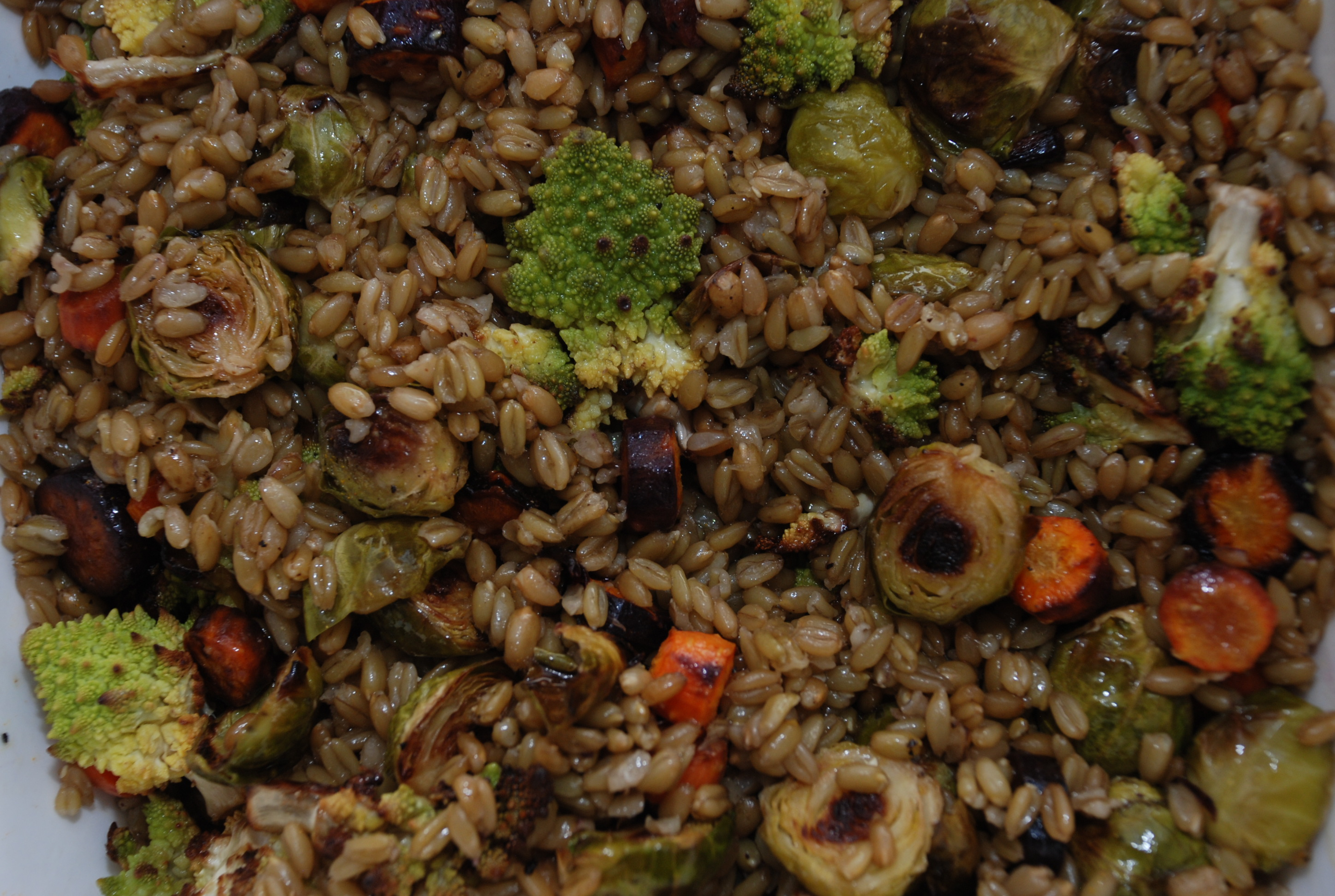
Freekeh with roasted vegetables

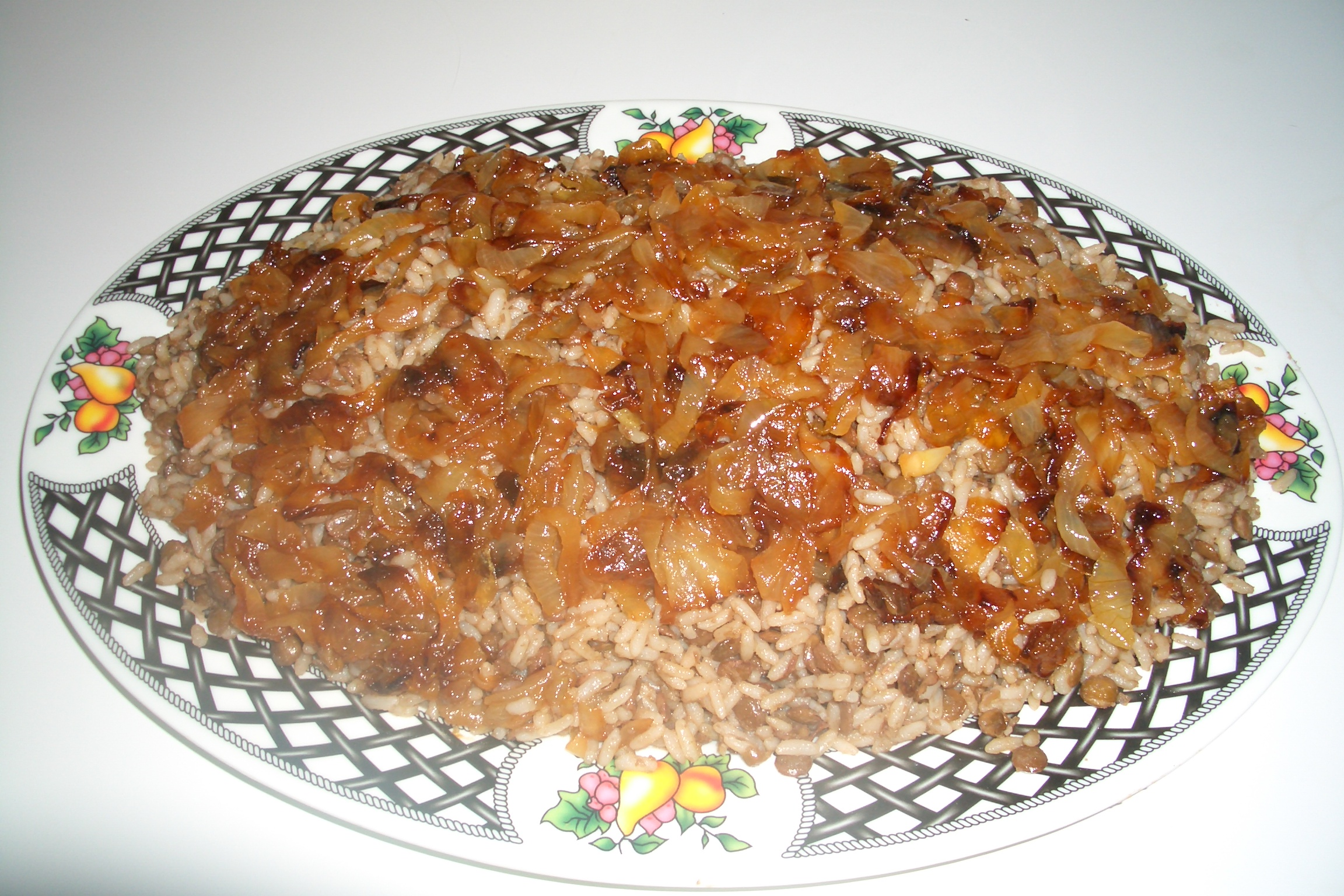
Mujaddara

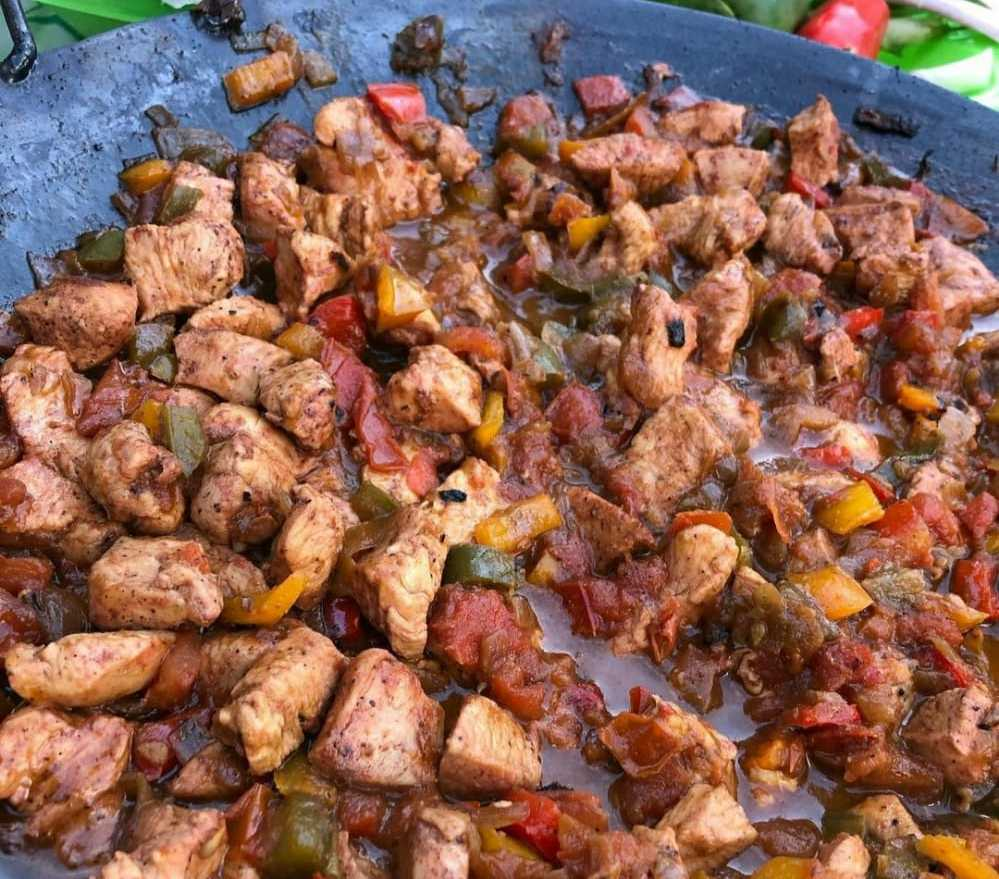
Jordanian Sajiyeh

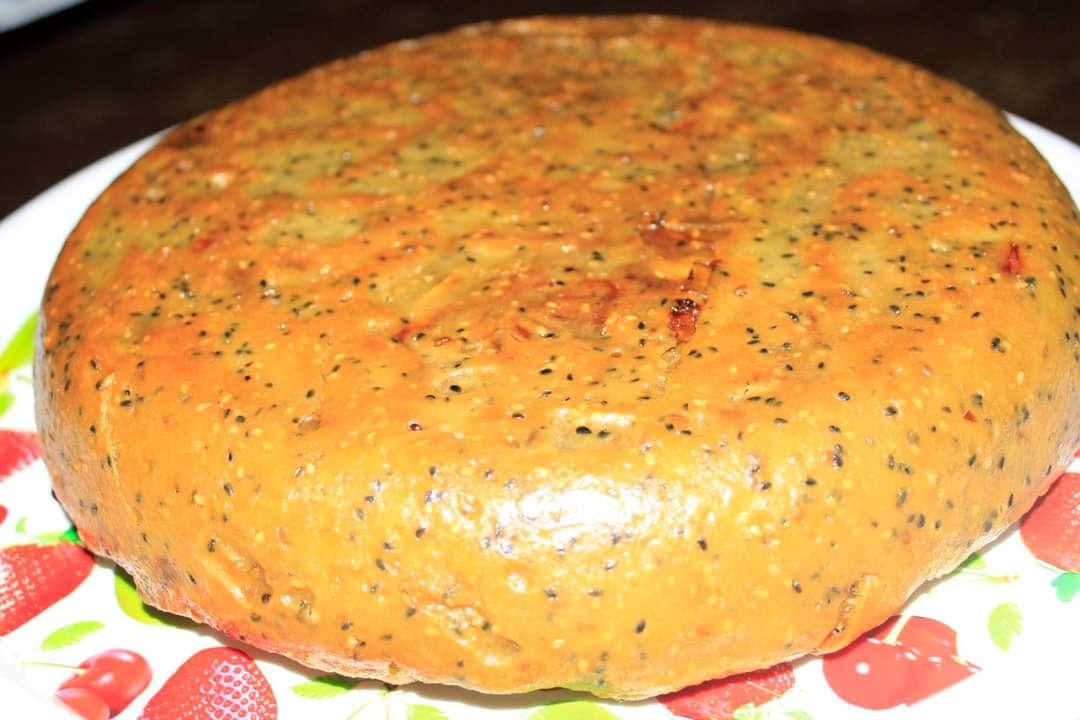
Makmoura

Name	Description
Al-rashoof (الرشوف)	A winter meal consisting of coarse wheat flour, lentils and yogurt, popular in northern Jordan.
Shishbarak (ششبرك)	Also known as Joshpara. A sort of dumpling or jiaozi dish. After being stuffed with ground beef and spices, thin wheat dough parcels are cooked with jameed then served hot. Another name for this dish is shishbarak.
Bamia (بامية)	Okra cooked with tomato sauce and onions, served with rice and lamb.
Burghul ahmar (البرغل الأحمر)	Bulgur cooked in tomato sauce and served with poultry.
Burghul biz-ziet (برغل بالزيت)	Bulgur cooked in olive oil and served with poultry.
Fasoulya beyda (الفاصوليا البيضاء)	White beans cooked in tomato sauce and served with rice.
Fasoulya khadra (فاصوليا خضراء)	Green beans cooked in tomato sauce and served with rice.
Fatteh (الفتّه )	Stack of khubz (bread), topped by strained yogurt, steamed chickpeas and olive oil that are crushed and mixed together.
Freekeh (فريكة)	Served with poultry or meat. Meat is fried in oil and braised with water, salt, and cinnamon bark. Then dried coriander is stirred in with freekeh and cooked.
Galayet bandora (قلّاية بندورة)	Tomatoes sauteed and stewed with onions, olive oil, salt, and hot peppers, it can be served with rice but is more commonly eaten with bread in Jordan.
Haneeth (stuffed baby lamb) (محشوة الضأن الرضيع)	A popular dish in Jordan, which people enjoy as a big and heavy meal. It consists of roasted lamb, stuffed with rice, chopped onions, nuts and raisins.
Kabsa (الكبسة)	Made from a mixture of spices, rice (usually long-grain, mostly basmati), meat and vegetables.
Kebab (كباب)	Roasted or grilled, also known as mashawi. A mixed grill of barbecued meats such as kebab and shish taouk.
Kofta b'bandura (كفتة بالبندورة)	Spiced, ground meat baked in tomato sauce and served with rice.
Kofta b'tahini (كفتة الطحينة)	Spiced, ground meat baked in a sea of tahini, topped with thinly sliced potatoes and pine nuts and served with rice.
Kousa mahshi (كوسا محشي)	Rice and minced meat stuffed in zucchinis. Usually served with chicken and wara' aynab (also called dawali).
Malfuf (ملفوف)	Rice and minced meat rolled in cabbage leaves.
Makmoura (مكمورة)	A meatpie made with chicken and onion filling
Mansaf (المنسف)	The national dish of Jordan and their most distinctive food. Mansaf is a traditional dish made of lamb cooked in a sauce of fermented dried yogurt called jameed and served with rice or bulgur.
Mujalaleh	A dish made from dough and clarified butter
Mujaddara (مجدّرة)	Lentil and rice casserole, garnished with roasted onions.
Mulukhiyah (ملوخيّة)	The leaves of Corchorus used as a vegetable.
Musaqa'h (مسقّعة)	Various Levantine variations of the Mediterranean dish are cooked in Jordan.
Sajiyeh (صاجيّة)	A dish made from bell peppers, onions, chilis, and meat fried in olive oil on a saj pan
Waraq Enab (Sarma) (ورق عنب)	Grape leaves filled with herbed, minced vegetables, meat and rice, cooked with olive oil. Sometimes called dawali.
Zarb (زارب)	Bedouin barbecue. Meat and vegetables cooked in a large underground pit.

=== Mezze ===
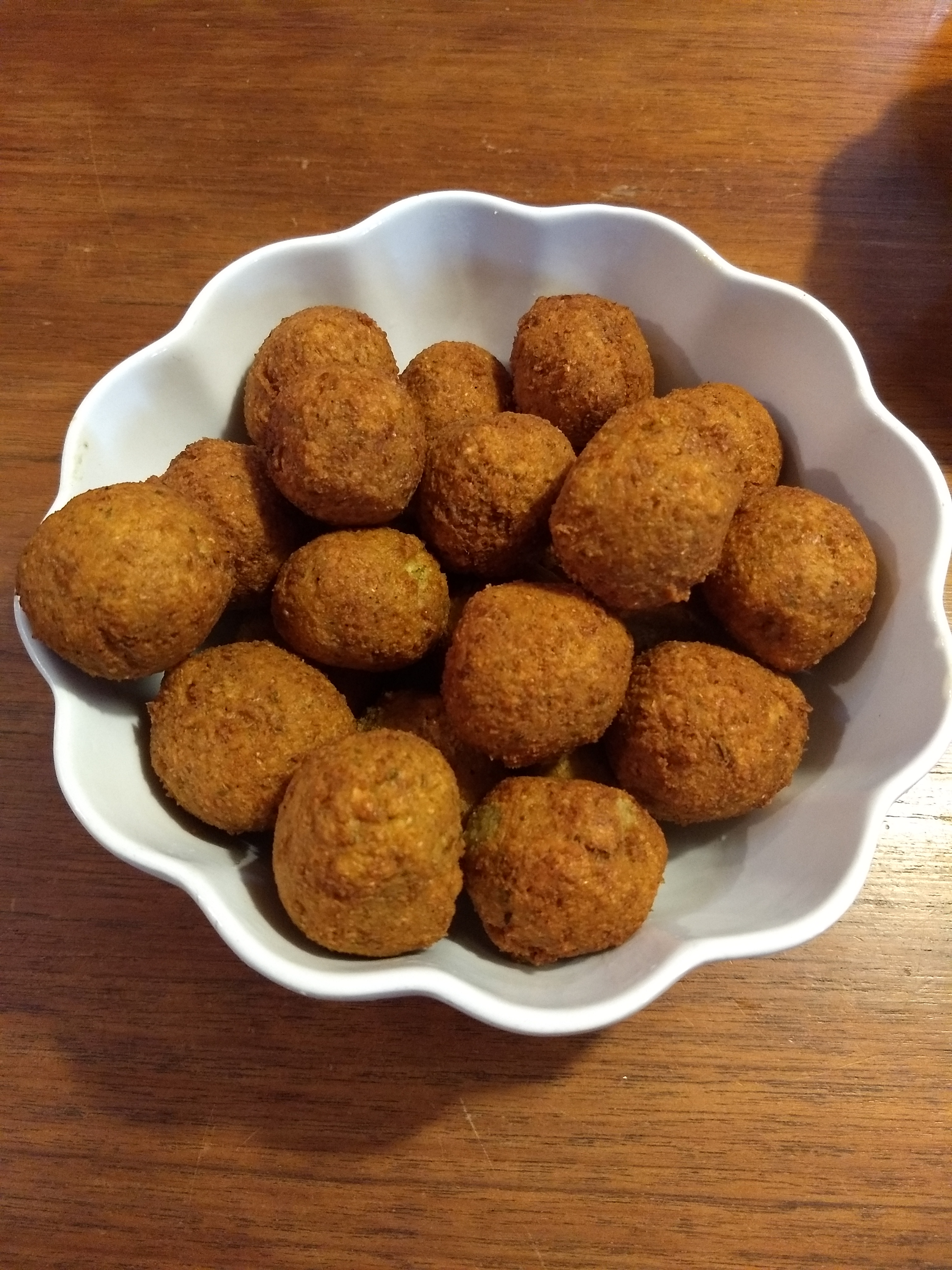
A bowl of falafel

By far the most dominant style of eating in Jordan, mezze is the small plate, salad, appetizer, community-style eating, aided by dipping, dunking and otherwise scooping with bread. Mezze plates are typically rolled out before larger main dishes.

A typical Jordanian mezze might include any combination of the following:

Name	Description
Arab salad (سلطة عربيّة)	Combines many different vegetables and spices.
Baba ghanoush (بابا غنّوج)	Finely chopped roasted eggplant, olive oil, lemon juice, various seasonings, and tahini..
Baqdonsiyyeh (بقدونسيّة)	Parsley blended with tahini and lemon juice, usually served with seafood.
Falafel (فلافل)	Balls of fried chickpea flour and Middle Eastern spice. Dipped in every mezze, especially hummus. The Jordanian falafel balls tend to come in smaller sizes.
Fattoush (فتّوش)	A salad made from toasted or fried pieces of pita bread combined with mixed greens and other vegetables, such as lettuce, radish and tomato.
Ful medames (فول مدمّس)	Crushed fava beans served with a variety of toppings such as olive oil, lemon juice, parsley, chili pepper, sumac and more.
Halloumi (حلّوم)	Semi-soft white cheese. Not quite as salty, crumbly and dry as feta cheese, but similar.
Hummus (حمّص)	Chick peas boiled and blended to perfect smoothness with tahini paste, garlic, olive oil, and lemon juice, and perhaps topped with a little parsley.
Khobbeizeh (خبّيزه)	Little mallow cooked with olive oil.
Kibbeh (كبّة)	Herbed, minced meat covered in a crust of bulgur (crushed wheat), then fried. Shaped like an American football.
Kibbeh labaniyyeh (كبّه لبنيّه)	A minced meat and bulgur mixture similar to ordinary kubbeh, but boiled with Jordanian jameed.
Kibbeh nayyeh (كبّة نيّة)	A minced meat and bulgur mixture similar to ordinary kubbeh, but the meat is served raw.
Labaneh Jarashiyyeh (لبنه جرشيّه)	Literally "labaneh from Jerash". Creamy yogurt, so thick it can be spread on flat bread to make a sandwich.
Makdous/Maqdous (مكدوس)	Stuffed pickled eggplant, said to increase appetite.
Manakish (مناقيش)	Flatbread dough usually topped with olive oil and za’atar spice blend. Other varieties may include cheese or ground meat and in this case it is called sfiha.
Olive oil (زيت الزيتون)	One of the cornerstones of Jordanian food. For breakfast, Jordanians dip flatbread into the olive oil, then into the za'atar.
Pickled vegetables (خضروات مخلّلة)	Jordanians enjoy pickled anything—carrots, radishes, cucumbers, cauliflower, and whatever other pickle-worthy vegetables might be around. Just about every mezze features a plate of these.
Samosa (سمبوسك)	Fried dough balls stuffed with meat, pine nuts and onions.
Tabbouleh (تبّولة)	Vegetarian dish traditionally made of tomatoes, finely chopped parsley, mint, bulgur and onion, and seasoned with olive oil, lemon juice, and salt. Some variations add garlic or lettuce, or use couscous instead of bulgur.
Tursu or (Mokhalal) (طرشي)	A certain type of alkhdharat soaked in water and salt in a pot and drawn from the air for the week such as cucumber and cabbage, eggplant flower, carrot, radish, onion, lemon, olives, chili and beans.
Yalanji (يلنجي)	Plate composed of vine leaves stuffed principally with rice.
Za'atar (زعتر)	A mixture of thyme and sesame seeds. Oregano, sage, or sumac can also be mixed in.
Zaitun (زيتون)	Olives.

=== Salads ===
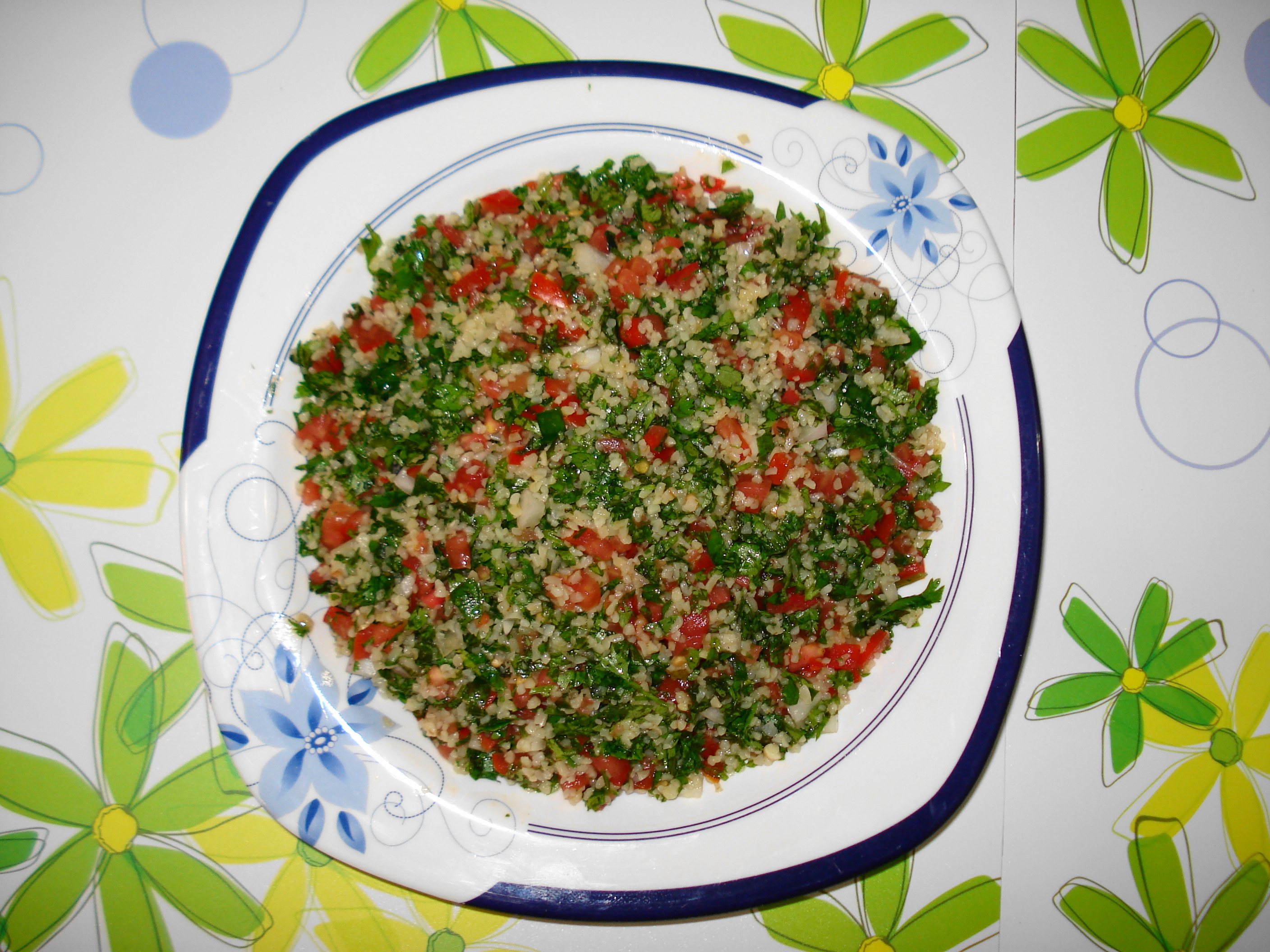
Tabbouleh

Name	Description
Arab salad (سلطة عربيّة)	Salad with tomato, cucumber, onion, mint, olive oil and lemon juice.
Babba ghanoush (بابا غنّوج)	Roasted eggplant, cut into pieces and tossed with tomatoes and onions.
Fattoush (فتّوش)	Chopped vegetable salad (tomato, cucumber, radish, etc.) tossed with pieces of dry or fried flatbread and seasoned with olive oil, lemon juice and sumac.
Olive salad (سلطة الزيتون)	Olives cut with carrots, green pepper, chili, dressed with olive oil.
Rocket salad (سلطة جرجير)	Rucola (arugula, rocket) leaves in Jordan are quite large, tossed with olive oil and lemon.
Huweirneh (حويرنة)	Made from sisymbrium officinale (hedge mustard) and yogurt.
Tabbouleh (تبّولة)	Finely chopped parsley and mint tossed with bulgur, tomatoes, onion and seasoned with olive oil and lemon juice.

=== Soups ===
In Jordan, meals are usually started with soups. Jordanian soups are usually named after their main ingredient such as:

Name	Description
Lentil soup (شوربة عدس)	Served hot. Smashed brown, red or green lentils with chicken or meat broth and several varieties of spices. Other ingredients may include vegetables such as carrots, potatoes, celery, parsley, and onion.
Freekeh soup (شوربة فريكة)	Served hot. Is a soup with Freekeh (green wheat), chicken or meat broth and several varieties of spices.

=== Sandwiches ===
Name	Description
Ara'yes (العرايس)	Literally meaning "bride", ara’yes are spicy mincemeat-filled oven-baked flatbread sandwiches.
Falafel (فلافل)	Fresh bread filled or wrapped with falafel, hummus, tomato and pickles.
Managish (مناقيش)	Taboon bread topped with za'atar and olive oil.
Mo'ajanat (معجّنات)	Pies filled with cheese, spinach, za'atar or beef.
Sambusak (سمبوسك)	Fried dough balls stuffed with cheese or meat with pine nuts and onions.
Sfiha (صفيحة)	Flatbread topped with ground beef and red peppers.
Shawarma (الشاورما)	Herbed and spiced chicken, lamb or beef on a spindle, sliced and then wrapped in flatbread, served with vegetables, tahini and hot sauce.

=== Bread ===
- Abud—a dense, unleavened traditional Jordanian Bedouin flatbread baked directly in a wood fire by burying in ash and covering with hot embers.
- Ka'ak (كعك)—a traditional Jordanian bread made mostly in a large leaf- or ring-shape and covered with sesame seeds.
- Karadeesh—a traditional Jordanian bread made from corn.
- Khubz (خبز, pita): Literally, "generic" bread, with a pocket.
- Shrak—a traditional Bedouin bread, popular in Jordan and the region as a whole. It is thrown to great thinness before being tossed onto a hot iron griddle called saj that's shaped like an inverted wok. Also known as markook (خبز).
- Taboon (خبز طابون)—a flatbread wrap used in many cuisines. It is traditionally baked in a tabun oven and eaten with different fillings. Also known as laffa bread, it is sold as street food, stuffed with hummus, falafel or shaved meat.
- Hamam (Arabic: خبز حمام, romanized: Khubz Ḥammām), a French-like bread loaf, often used to make sandwiches, sometimes called Sammoun, it is commonly consumed and is subject to price control.

=== Sweets ===
- Baklava (بقلاوة)—a dessert made with thin layers of phyllo pastry filled with chopped nuts and soaked in honey or syrup.
- Halva (حلوى)—a Middle-Eastern confection made from sesame flour and milk mixed with other ingredients, typically made with pistachios.
- Knafeh (كُنافة)—a cheese pastry of shredded phyllo soaked in sugar-based syrup.
- Qatayef (قطايف)—a sweet dumpling stuffed with cream and pistachios. Consumed during Ramadan.
- Warbat (وربات)—a pastry of thin layers of phyllo pastry filled with custard. Often eaten during the month of Ramadan.

=== Beverages ===
- Arabic coffee (Qahwa sada, قهوة عربيّة)—typically the domain of the Bedouins, consisting of ground fire-roasted beans and cardamom drawn thin and served in espresso-sized servings.
- Lime-mint juice—consists of lemon and mint.
- Qamar eddine (قمر الدين)—apricot juice, usually served in Ramadan.
- Sahlab (سحلب)—boiled milk with starch from Orchis tubers, covered with smashed coconut and cinnamon.
- Shaneeneh (شنينة)—a refreshing Jordanian beverage, consists of salty-sour aged goat milk yogurt, served cold.
- Tamar hindi (تمر هندي)—a very popular sweet-and-sour Ramadan drink made with tamarind juice.
- Arabic tea (شاي أسود)—usually black tea, typically flavored with na'na (mint) or meramiyyeh (sage) with copious amounts of sugar. Alghazaleen and Lipton are the most popular brands of tea in Jordan.
- Turkish-style coffee (قهوة تركيّة)—significantly stronger than its Arabic brother. Water is heated in a long-handled metal cup and the grounds (and any sugar) are mixed in as the combination is brewed over a gas flame to bubbling.

== See also ==
- Arab cuisine
- Beer in Jordan
- Israeli cuisine
- Jordanian wine
- Lebanese cuisine
- Levantine cuisine
- Palestinian cuisine
- Syrian cuisine
