= Shakriyeh =

Levantine yogurt and lamb stew

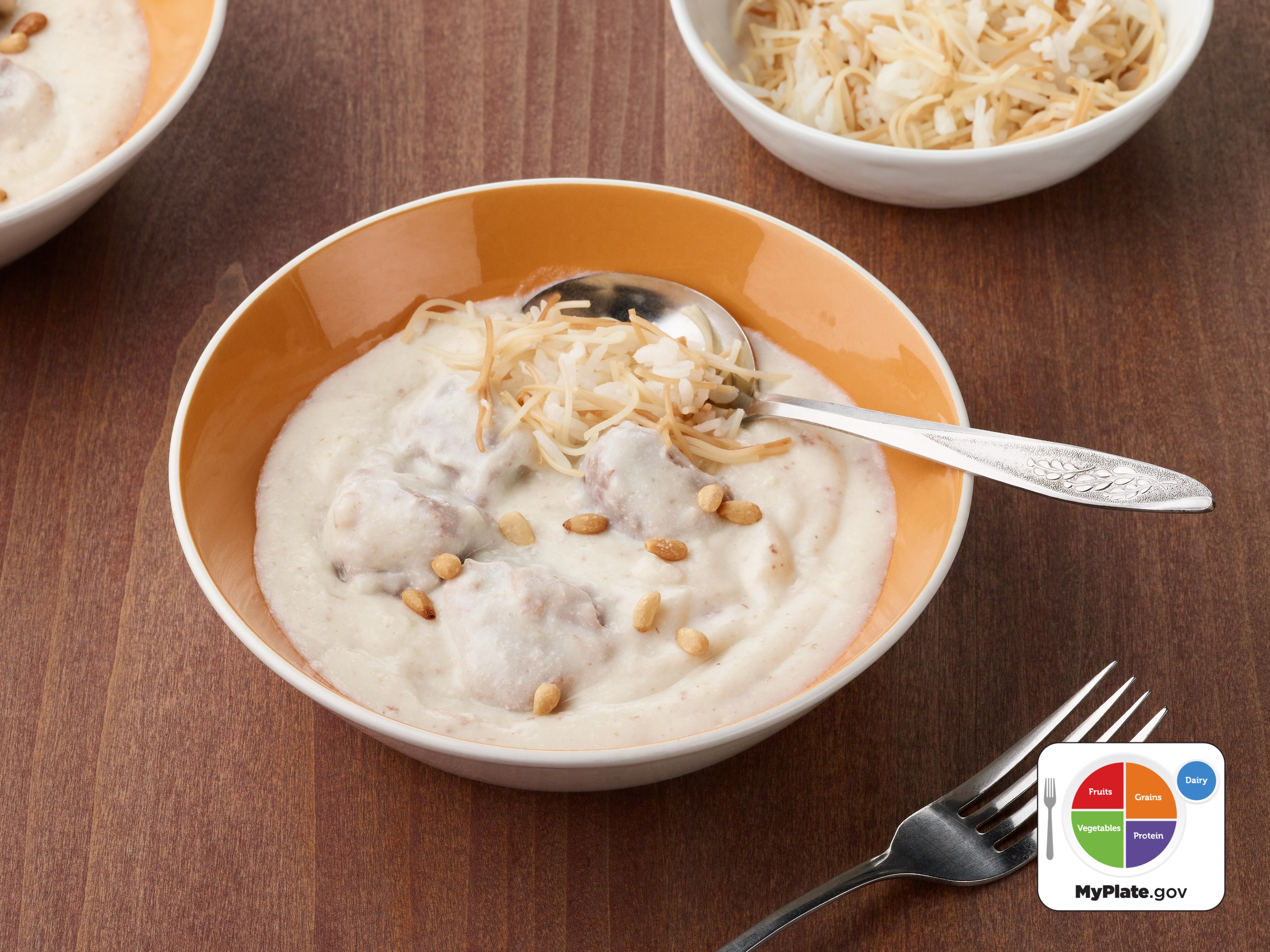
- Shakriyeh with vermicelli rice
- Alternative names: Laban emmo
- Type: Stew
- Course: Main
- Place of origin: Levant
- Associated cuisine: Levantine cuisine
- Main ingredients: Lamb, yogurt

Shakriyeh (Arabic: شاكرية, also known as "laban emmo") is a traditional Levantine stew of lamb cooked in yogurt, often served with Arabic rice.

== Etymology ==
The origin of the name shakriyeh is disputed, the word shakriyeh itself is derived from the Arabic word for "to thank" (ushkur, أشكر). The name shakriyeh is thought to have been derived from the first name "shakir" (شاكر), with the person it was named after remaining unknown. Other sources disregard this theory and attribute an Aramaic origin to the word. Common spellings include shakriyyeh and shakriya.

The name laban emmo (Arabic: لبن امه, also spelled laban ummo) is common in some regions, such as Lebanon, the name translates to "his mother's milk", implying that the lamb meat is to be cooked in the lambs own mothers milk, according to Syrian historian Khayr al-Din al-Asadi, it is a reference to the 10 commandments in Jewish doctrine. The name may laban emmo may refer to shakriyeh or a specific variety of it.

== Preparation and varieties ==
The dish is traditionally prepared by cooking lamb meat in laban rayeb with aromatics and spices, often topped with garlic, and served with vermicelli rice. Some varieties use chicken in place of lamb. Despite the similarity to mansaf, it does not use jameed.

Arman (أرمان) is a Syrian dish similar to shakriyeh made by cooking the meat in a pan before adding it to the stew.

== History ==
Recipes for meat cooked in yogurt can be found in medieval Arabic cookbooks, according to author Claudia Roden, 10th century poet Badi' al-Zaman al-Hamadani wrote a story about such a dish called madira (مضيرة).

Shakriyeh is attested as early as the 19th century; Lebanese scholar Butrus al-Bustani defined shakriyeh in his 1867 dictionary titled Kitāb Muḥīṭ al-muḥīṭ as "a dish of meat cooked in yogurt".

== Culture ==
Shakriyeh is typically cooked to celebrate special occasions. Muslims traditionally cook shakriyeh on Eid al-Fitr as well as Eid al-Adha, and on the first day of Ramadan, and Christians prepare it on Christmas. Shakriyeh and similar Levantine yogurt stews are most common during spring. The availability of the ingredients, mainly meat and dairy, was impacted negatively by the Syrian civil war.

Shakriyeh features in several traditional Syrian proverbs and poems. It is associated with other Levantine festive yogurt dishes, like shishbarak, kibbeh labaniyyeh, sheikh al-mahshi, among others.
