= Beer in Jordan =

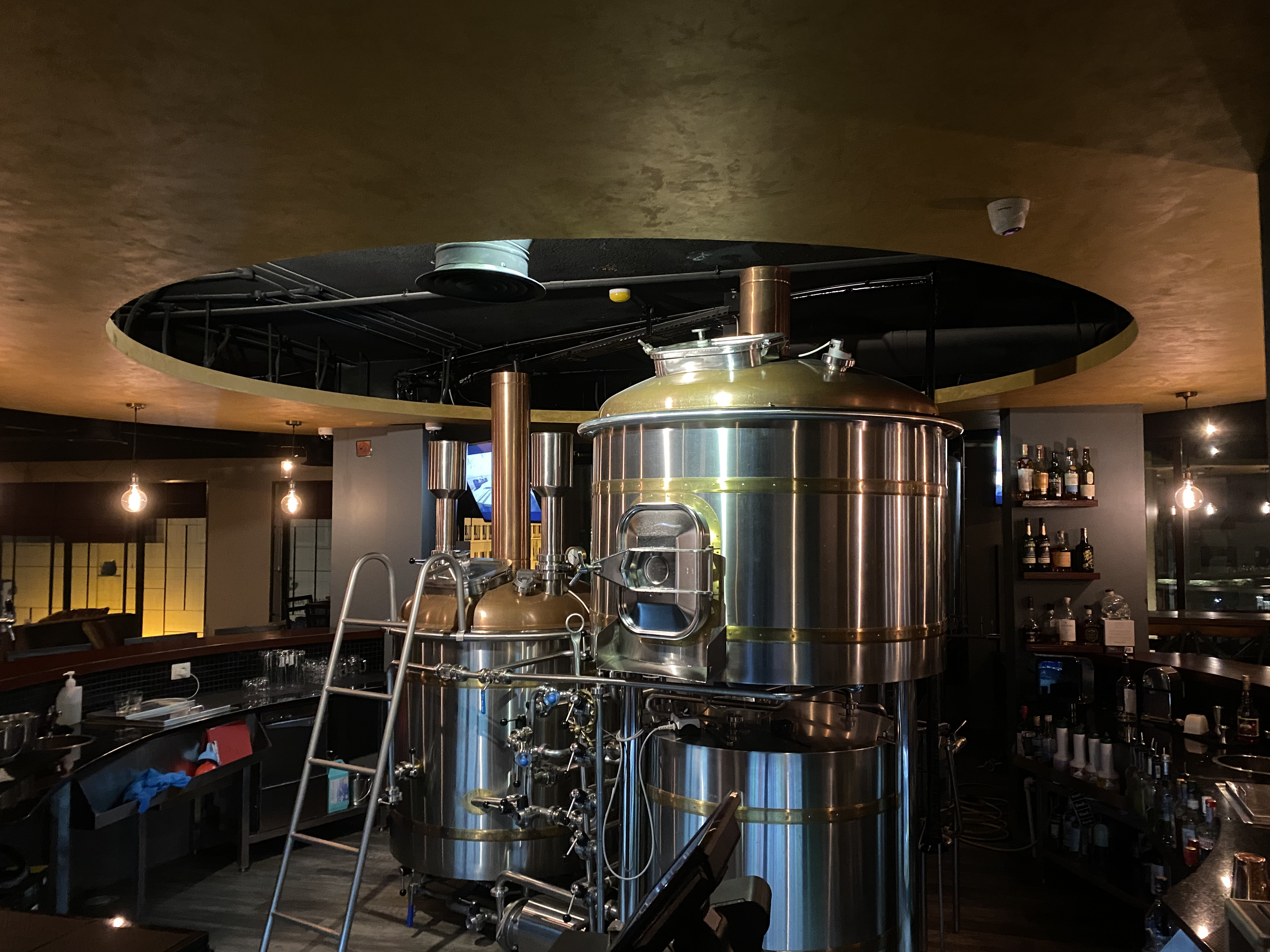
Inside of the Biera microbrewery in Amman, 2023

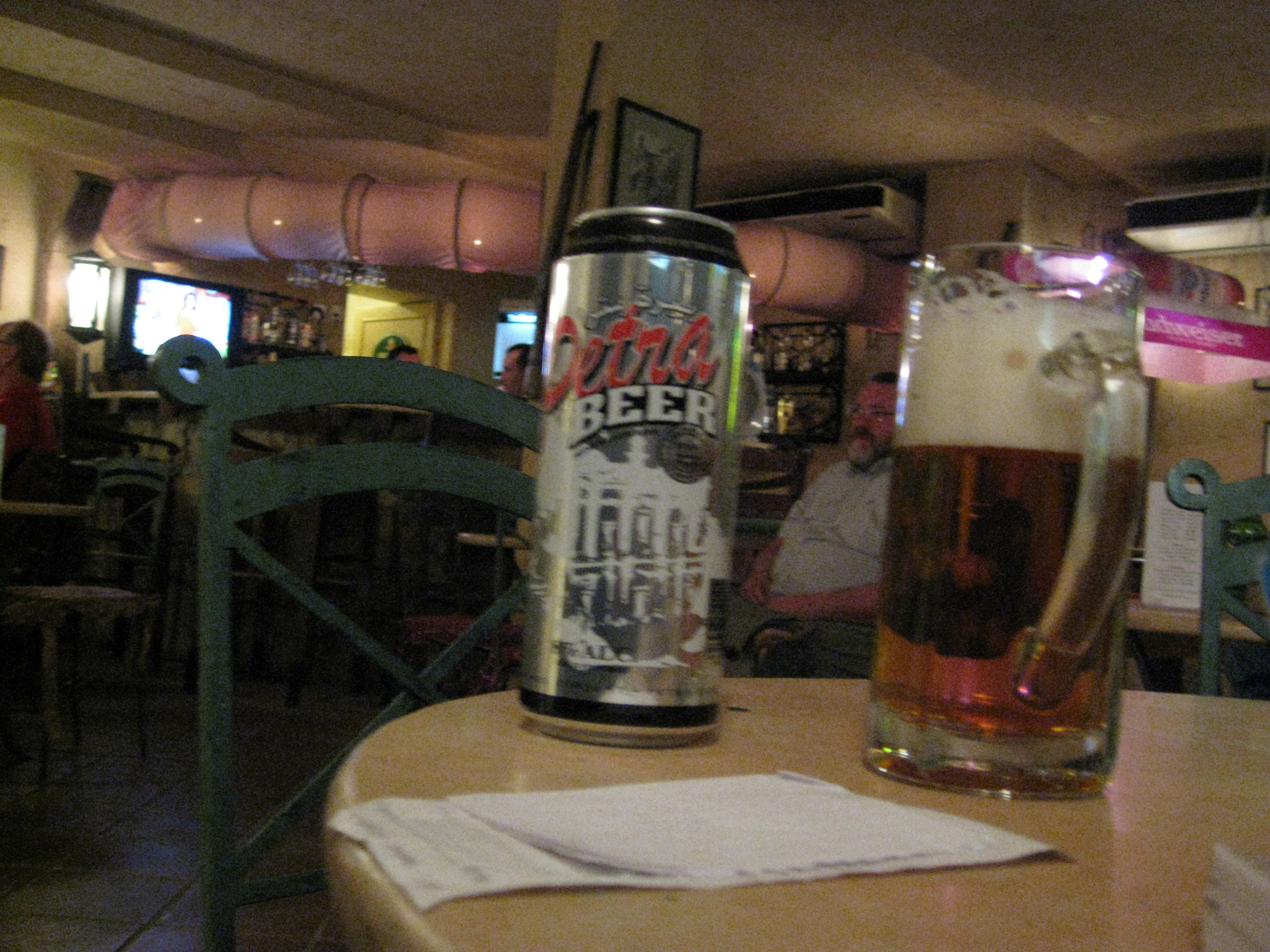
Petra beer

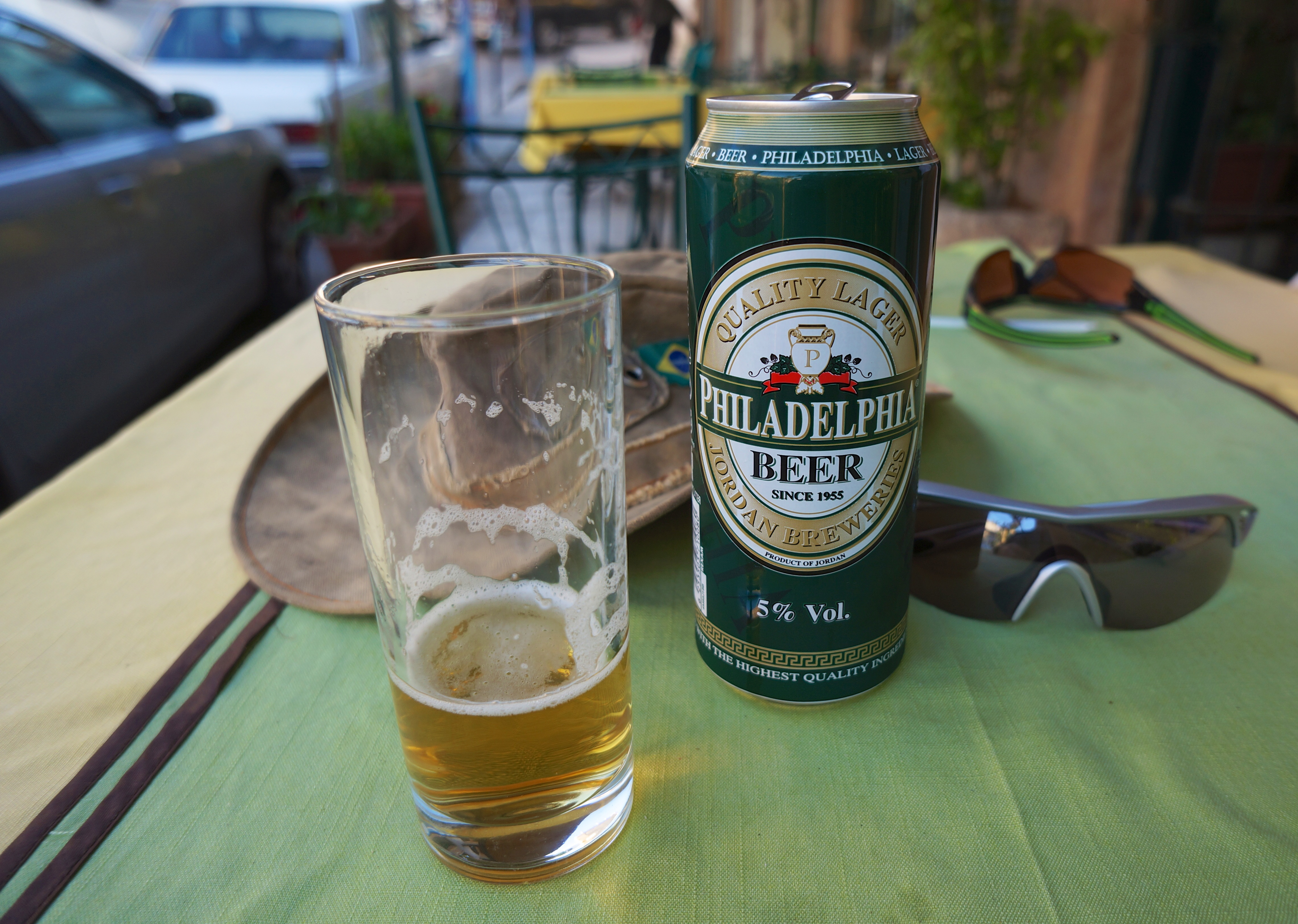
Philadelphia beer

Beer in Jordan has existed since its first introduction in the Middle East region thousands of years ago in ancient Iraq and ancient Egypt.

Today the country still has several companies producing beer.

== Modern history ==
The first brewery in Jordan was the General Investment Company (GIC), which was established in 1955 as a public company called "Jordan Brewery Co. Ltd." In 1958, built the first Amstel beer factory outside the Netherlands, established in Zarqa.

In 1964, GIC introduced Petra, the oldest local brew of Jordan. It is available in 3 different varieties—Lager, Weizen and Amber—and is brewed in Zarqa. Petra is known for its high alcohol content, 8% alcohol by volume (ABV) for regular or 10% for Petra Premium. Amstel remains the most consumed beer in Jordan, followed by Petra. Petra is brewed from barley and is made in Zarqa.

In 2010, Jordan's first microbrewery, Carakale Brewery, was established in Fuheis, a predominantly Christian town in the governorate of Balqa.

== See also ==
- Jordanian cuisine
- Jordanian wine
