= Carakale Brewing Company =

Microbrewery in Fuheis near Amman, Jordan

Carakale Brewery
- Company type: Private
- Industry: Alcoholic beverage
- Founded: 2010
- Headquarters: Amman, Jordan
- Key people: Wael M. Sabanekh Krister Hopen
- Products: Beer
- Production output: 0.4 million litres

Carakale is a Jordanian Craft Beer founded in 2010 in the town of Fuheis near Amman. The brewery is named after Caracal, a mammal that is native to Jordan, and Ale the main type of yeast used to produce Carakale.

== History ==
Carakale was Jordan's first microbrewery and its first production beer was a blonde ale of the same name intended to serve as entry-level brew for the Jordanian domestic market, which was unacquainted with craft beer culture.

The brewery sold its first bottle in late 2013, was producing 40,000 bottles a month by mid-2014, and was available in most of the approximately 600 stores, bars, restaurants, and hotels that sell alcohol in Jordan by late 2017.

Carakale has collaborating with several US breweries, including the Arizona Wilderness Brewing Company, with which it made a Dead Sea-salted and grapefruit-flavoured Gose beer, "Dead Sea-rious", and the Against The Grain Brewery, with which it produced a fig and chamomile Pilsner and a za'atar-spiced Saison.

== See also ==
- Jordanian cuisine
- Jordanian wine
