= Zumot Winery =

- Location: Irbid, Jordan
- Founded: 1996
- Key people: Omar Zumot
- Parent company: Zumot Group
- Cases/yr: 8000
- Known for: Saint George
- Tasting: By appointment contact@zumot-wines.com
- Website: www.zumot-wines.com

Zumot Winery is a family owned winery in Jordan. The winery, one of two producers of Jordanian wine, gained itself international praise due to its investment in organic wines. The winery has three vineyards: in Madaba, in Jerash, and in Irbid. Fish ponds are used to provide waters rich in nitrates from fish manure and a sheep flock that act as natural lawnmowers and fertilizers. The winery garnered several awards, including silver medals for its Chenin blanc and Merlot at the Vinalies Internationales wine contest in Paris, France. Its brand is called Saint George wines, named after the Saint George church in Madaba where the first vineyard was located.
