= Saj bread =

Unleavened bread baked on a griddle

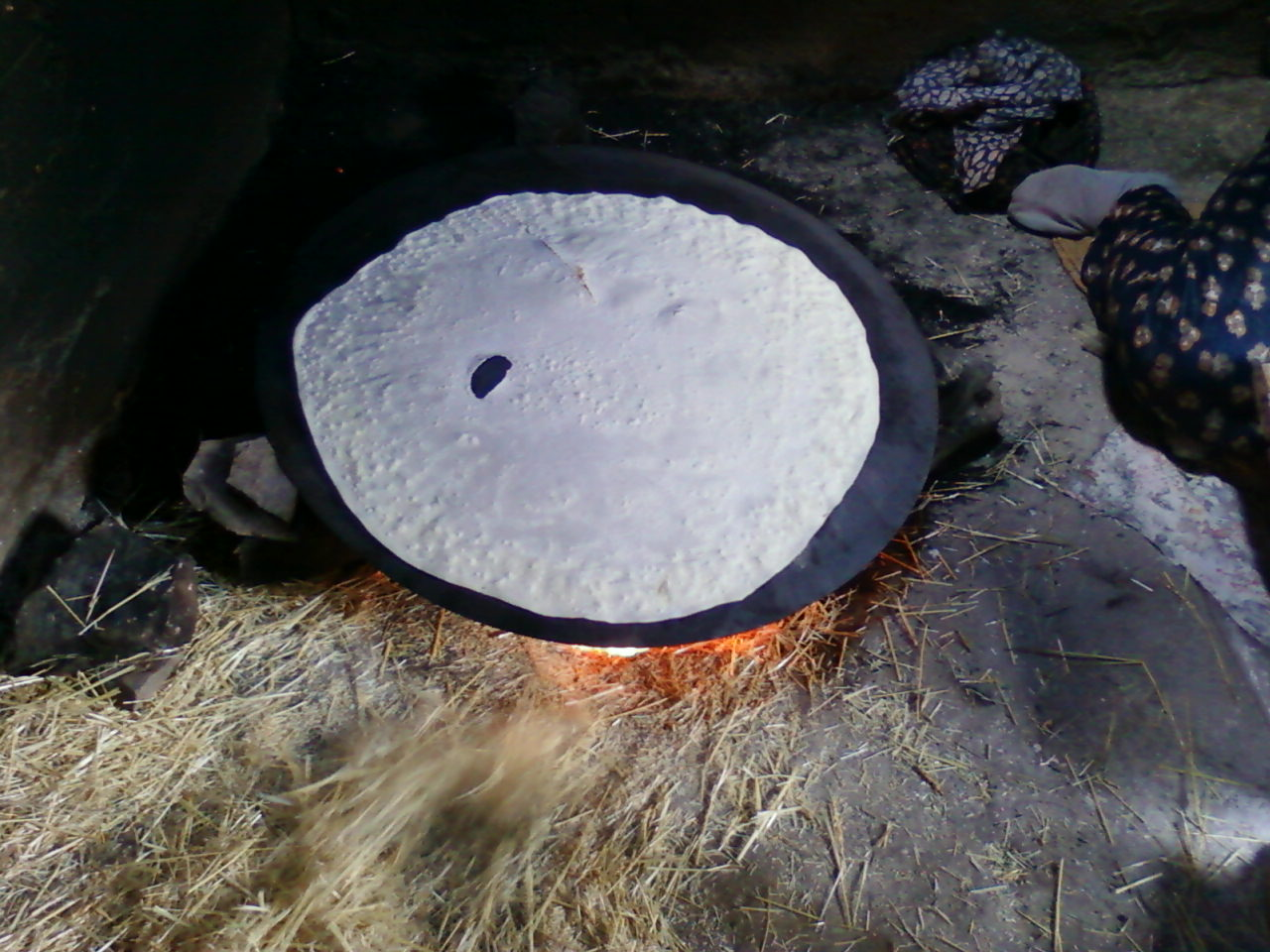
- Unleavened yufka bread made on griddle
- Type: Flatbread
- Place of origin: Middle East
- Main ingredients: Flour, water, salt

Saj bread (Arabic: خبز صاج, romanized: khubz ṣāj, Turkish: sac ekmeği, Sorani Kurdish: نانی کوردی, romanized: nanî kurdî), also known as markook bread (خبز مرقوق, khubz marqūq), khubz ruqaq (رقاق), shrak (شراك), khubz rqeeq (رقيق), or mashrooh (مشروح), is a type of unleavened flatbread in Middle Eastern cuisine that is baked on a metal griddle called a saj.

Markook bread
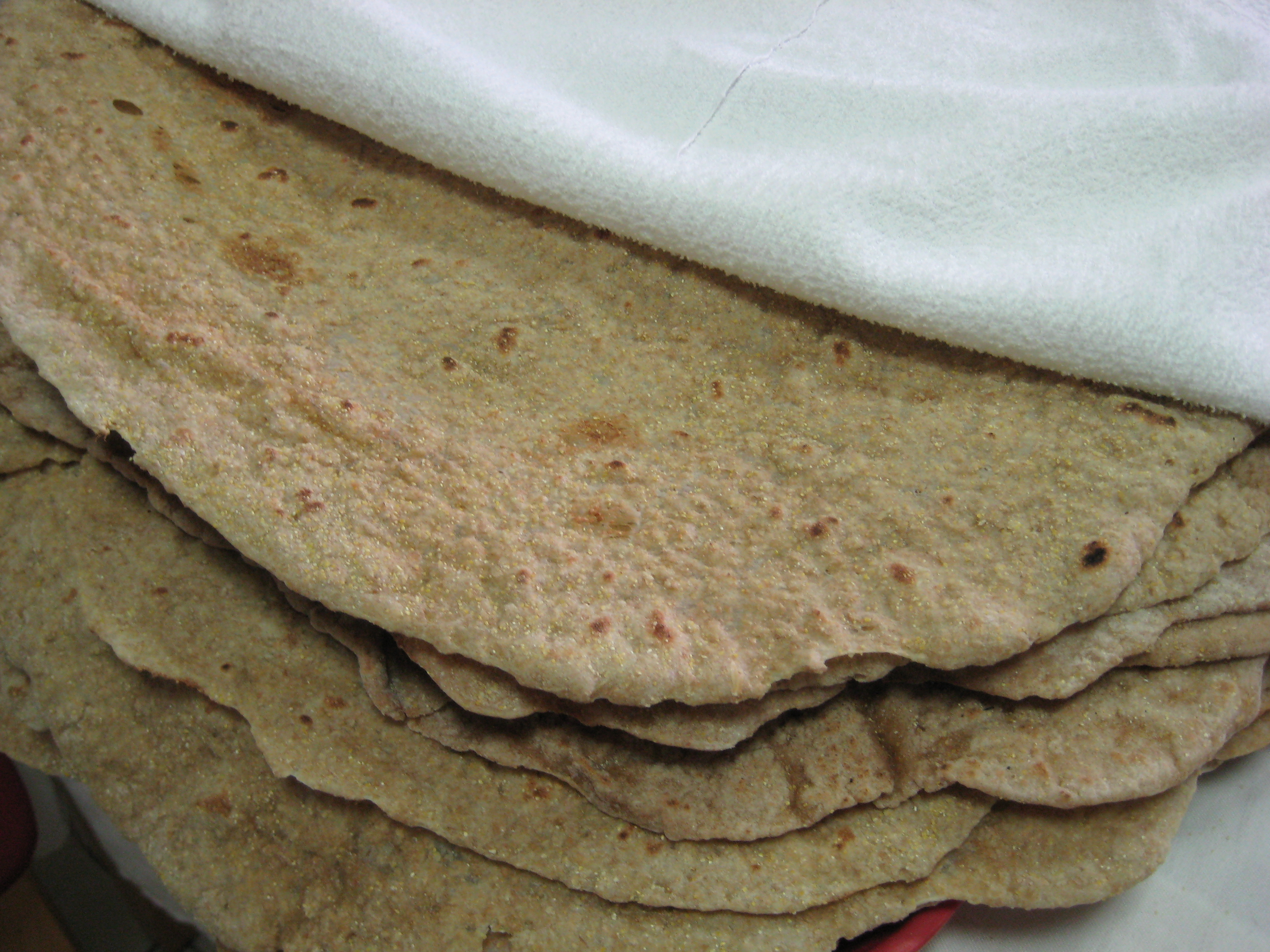
- Alternative names: Shrak, ruqaq, rqeeq, or mashrooh
- Type: Flatbread
- Place of origin: Middle East
- Region or state: Levant and Arabian Peninsula

Markook shrak is a type of thin, almost translucent bread. The dough is unleavened and usually made with only flour, water, and salt. After being rested, the dough is divided into round portions, flattened, and spread across a round cushion until it is thin, then flipped onto the saj. It is often folded and put in bags before being sold.

It is commonly compared to pita, also found in Middle Eastern cuisine, although saj bread is much larger and thinner. In some Arab countries, such as Yemen, different names are given for the same flatbread, such as khamir, maluj and ṣaluf, depending on the regional dialects. In Israel, markook is usually referred to as Druze pita, but may also be referred to as laffa, though markook and laffa are distinct types of flatbread.

== Etymology ==
The name "sac(saj)" comes from Old Turkish "sāç" meaning frying surface.

Markook (مرقوق) comes from the Arabic word raqiq (رقيق) meaning delicate, and raqiq also comes from the verb Raq (رق).

== History ==
Markook was mentioned in the tenth-century cookbook of Ibn Sayyar al-Warraq under the name ruqaq. He describes it as large and paper-thin, unleavened bread.

German orientalist Gustaf Dalman described the markook in Palestine during the early 20th-century as being also the name applied to flatbread made in a tannour, although, in this case, it was sometimes made with leavening agents.

== Bread ==
Yufka bread (Turkish: yufka ekmeği) is the Turkish name of a very thin, large (60 cm [24 in]) unleavened flatbread in Turkish cuisine, also known under different names in Arab cuisine, baked on a convex metal griddle, called saj in Arabic and sac in Turkish.

Arab saj bread is somewhat similar to markook shrek, but is thinner and larger.

In Palestine, the saj bread is simply called shrāke (شراك), differing from the markook, which is baked in a clay oven (tannur). Shrak is also popular in Jordan and is traditionally made ahead of Eid so that dishes like fatteh and mansaf can be served during Eid.

Farasheeh (فراشيح) is a type of saj bread popular in the Gaza Strip, its ingredients are simply water, flour, and salt, and sometimes semolina flour, after the dough is prepared, its cut to pieces and left to rest. It is also made by bedouins in the Sinai Peninsula.

In Cyprus, it is known as pitta satzis (πίττα της σατζίης, pitta tis satziis, i.e. “satzi (flat)bread” or “(flat)brad of (from) satzi”), also called kattimeri. It is eaten as a snack. The dough is lightly sweetened with honey and cinnamon.

== Stuffed bread ==
Gözleme is a savory, soft Turkish stuffed flatbread, cooked on the convex saç.

== Gallery ==
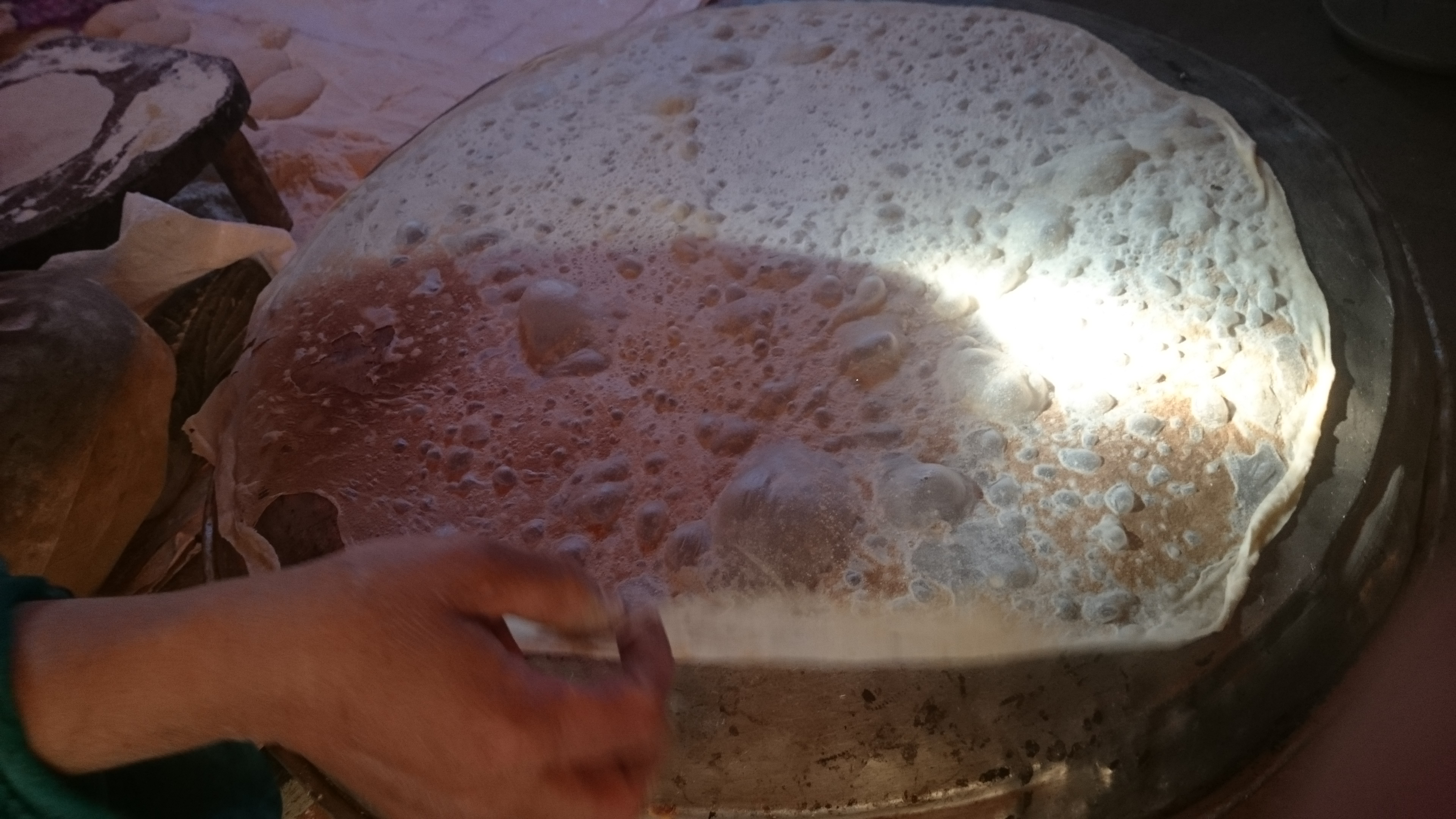
Kurdish bread (Iran)

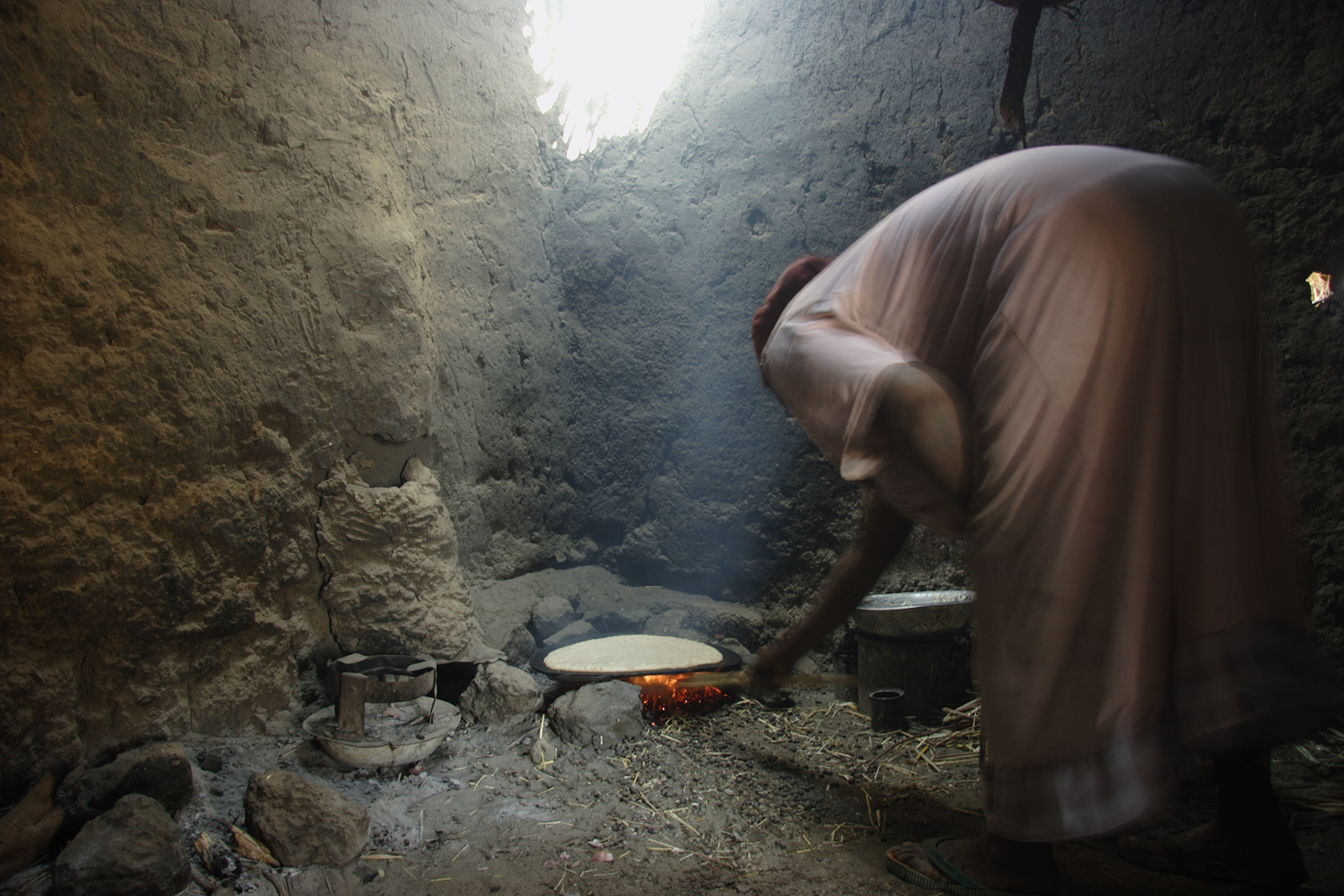
Qurasah (Sudan)

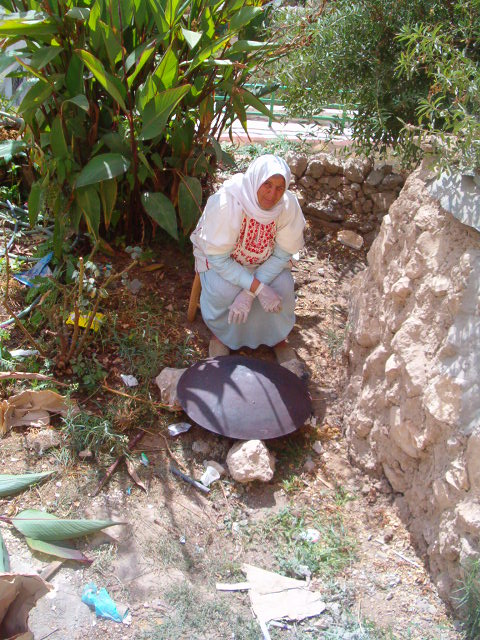
Shrāke (Palestine)

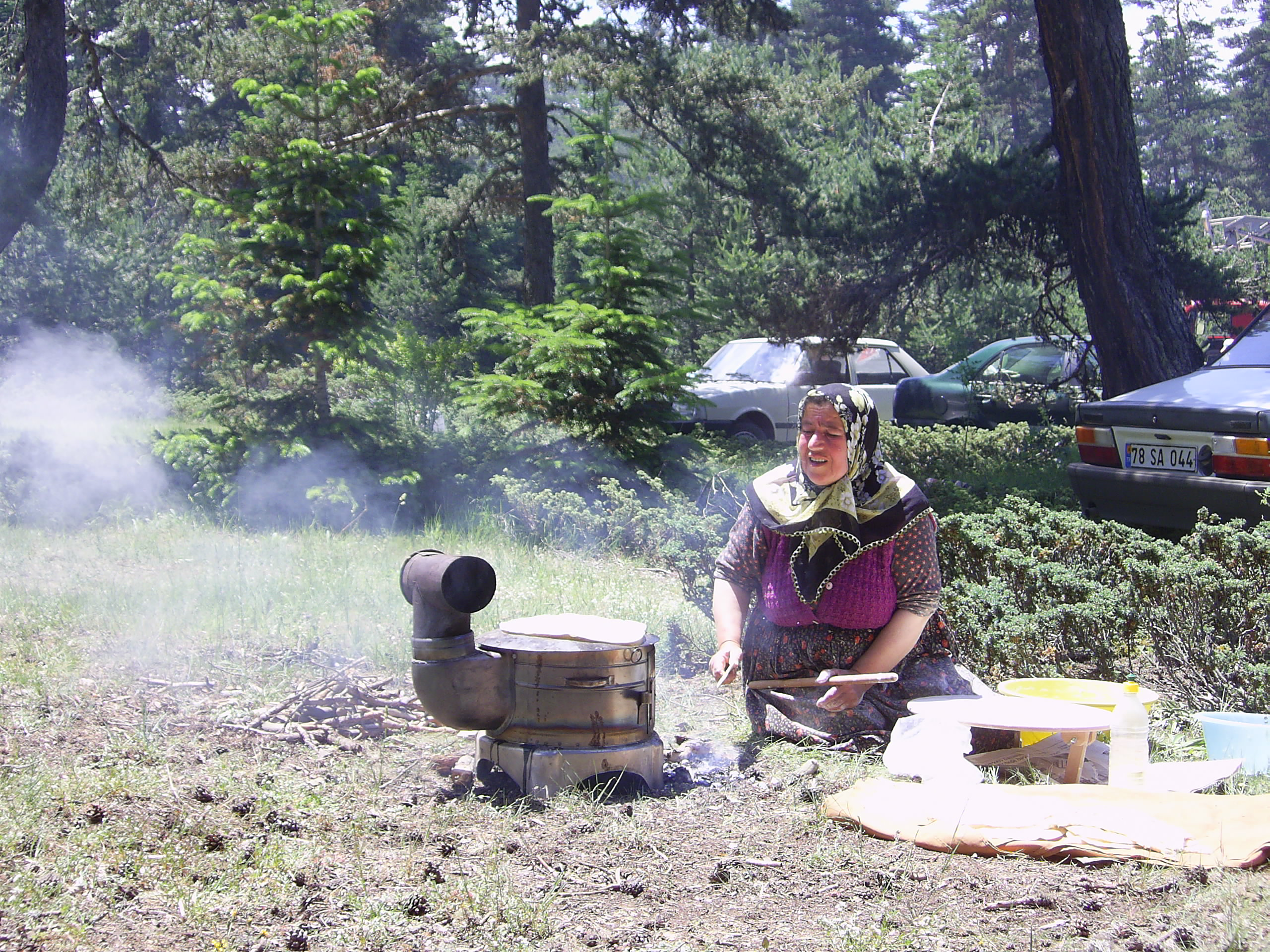
Yufka bread (Turkey)

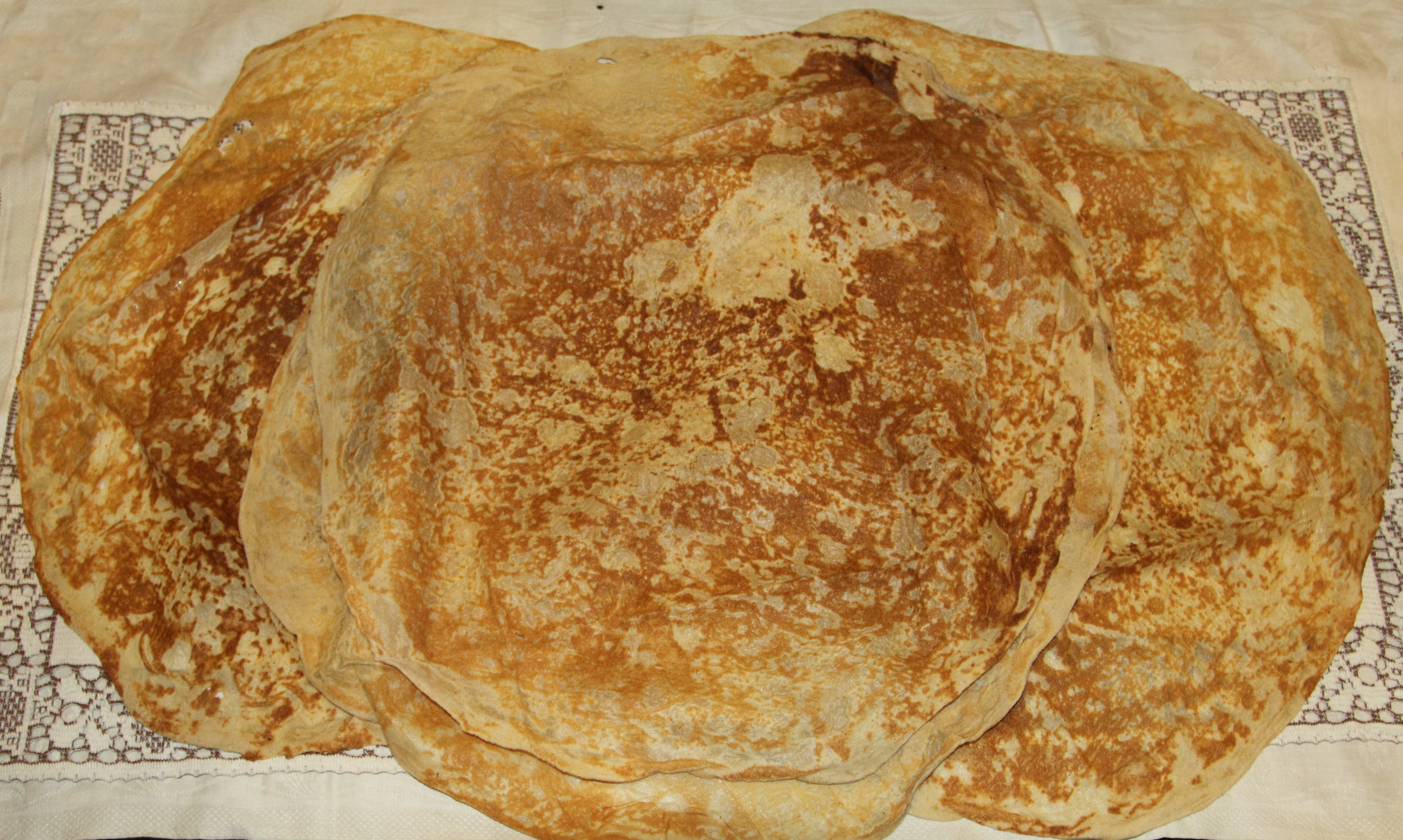
Markouk prepared by Syrian Jews in Jerusalem

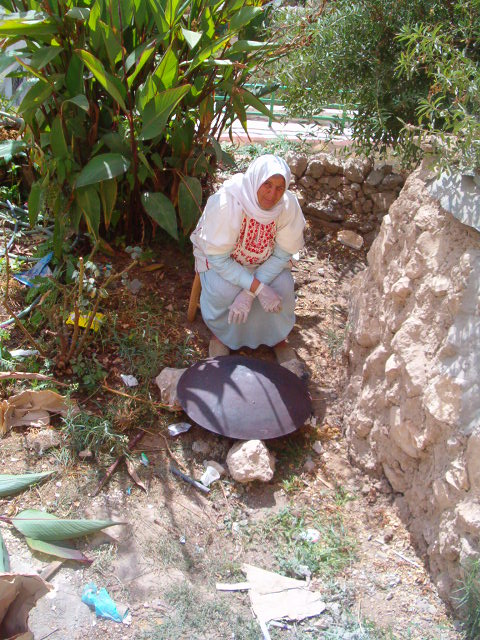
Baking markook bread

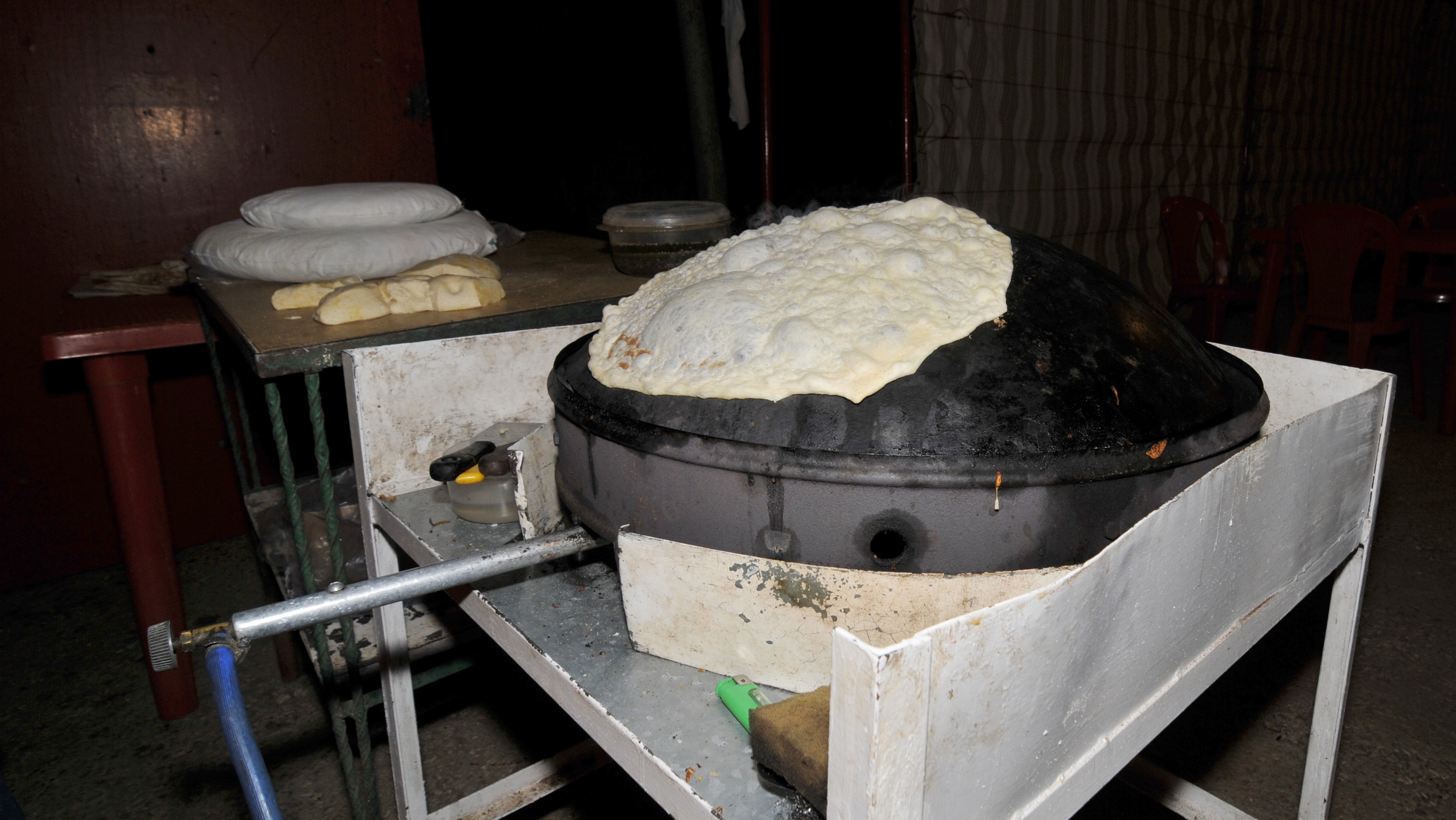
Markouk being prepared and cooked on a saj

== See also ==
- Chapati
- Gözleme
- Lavash
- Naan
- Pane carasau
- Piadina
- Rumali roti
- List of flatbreads
