= Mansaf =

Arab lamb dish

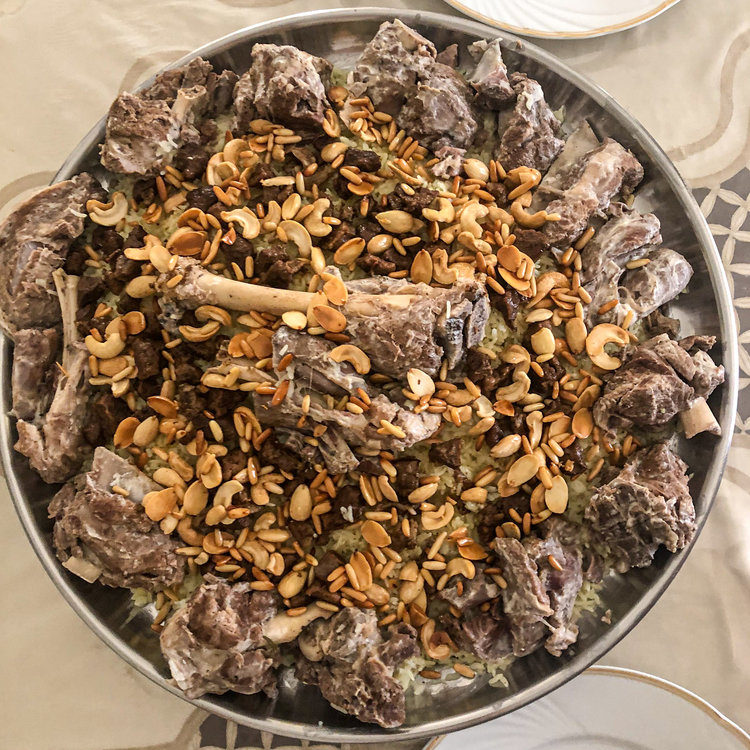
- A variant of mansaf in Amman, Jordan made with samneh (ghee)-infused rice and decorated with sauteed nuts alongside jameed-drenched lamb.
- Course: Meal
- Place of origin: Jordan
- Region or state: Jordanian Highlands, Southern Levant
- Serving temperature: Hot
- Main ingredients: lamb, jameed, rice or bulgur, shrak bread
- Variations: Laban emmo, shakreyyeh

Mansaf (Arabic: منسف /‍ˈ‍man‍.‍saf‍‍‍/) is a traditional Jordanian dish made of lamb, cooked in a sauce of fermented dried yogurt and served with rice or bulgur.

It is a popular dish eaten throughout the Levant. It is considered the national dish of Jordan and common and popular especially in Palestine. The name of the dish comes from the term "large tray" or "large dish", and is speculated to have biblical, ancient roots. The dish evolved greatly between the 1940s and late 1980s, undergoing changes in the recipe as well as in the preparation process.

== History ==
The dish described and prepared by Abraham in Genesis 18 to host travellers passing by his tent, but from which he himself does not eat, is identified by some biblical scholars as mansaf. It has long been held that ancient Canaanites used to make this food at feasts, perhaps celebrating the beginning of the season of spring, and that the prohibition against mixing meat with milk mentioned in the Torah was to distance from these cultic practices, but this view is challenged as speculative. While cautioning against extending present day food practices and ideologies around food into the far past and noting the biblical prohibition against meat and dairy mixing, other scholars note Chalcolithic evidence for the boiling of meat and use of dairies and breads is present at archaeological sites in Jordan, and that the high status accorded to meat and bread in Bedouin culture, which disdains leaving staler pieces unused, may indeed reflect some of the biblical norms.

Tradition in Jordan holds that mansaf dates back to at least the time of the 9th century BCE King Mesha (Moabite: 𐤌𐤔𐤏, vocalized as: Mōšáʿ) of Moab, who exhorted his people to make it to distinguish themselves from Hebrews with whom he was at war.

The original pastoralist Bedouin mansaf underwent significant changes in the 20th century. The dish is said to originally have been made with simply meat (camel or lamb), meat broth or ghee (clarified butter) and bread.

19th century orientalist Reinhart Dozy described mansaf ruzz (ruzz means "rice") as a "heap of cooked rice".

Following the popularization of rice in northern Transjordan in the 1920s, rice gradually was introduced into the dish, at first mixed with bulgur, and later on its own, until the dish reached its modern incarnation of being based on white rice. Similarly, the jameed sauce is a recent development, as the Bedouins did not historically feature jameed in their cooked dishes until their modern sedentarization.

== Preparation ==
Cooking mansaf is a master-apprentice tradition requiring hours of preparation. It begins with the cutting of meat on the bone into sections and placing it in boiling yogurt, where it is simmered for hours over a steady heat. This yogurt broth can be made from a thin, soured milk (laban imkheedh) or a hard, dry yogurt (jameed, described in further detail below).

=== Jameed ===
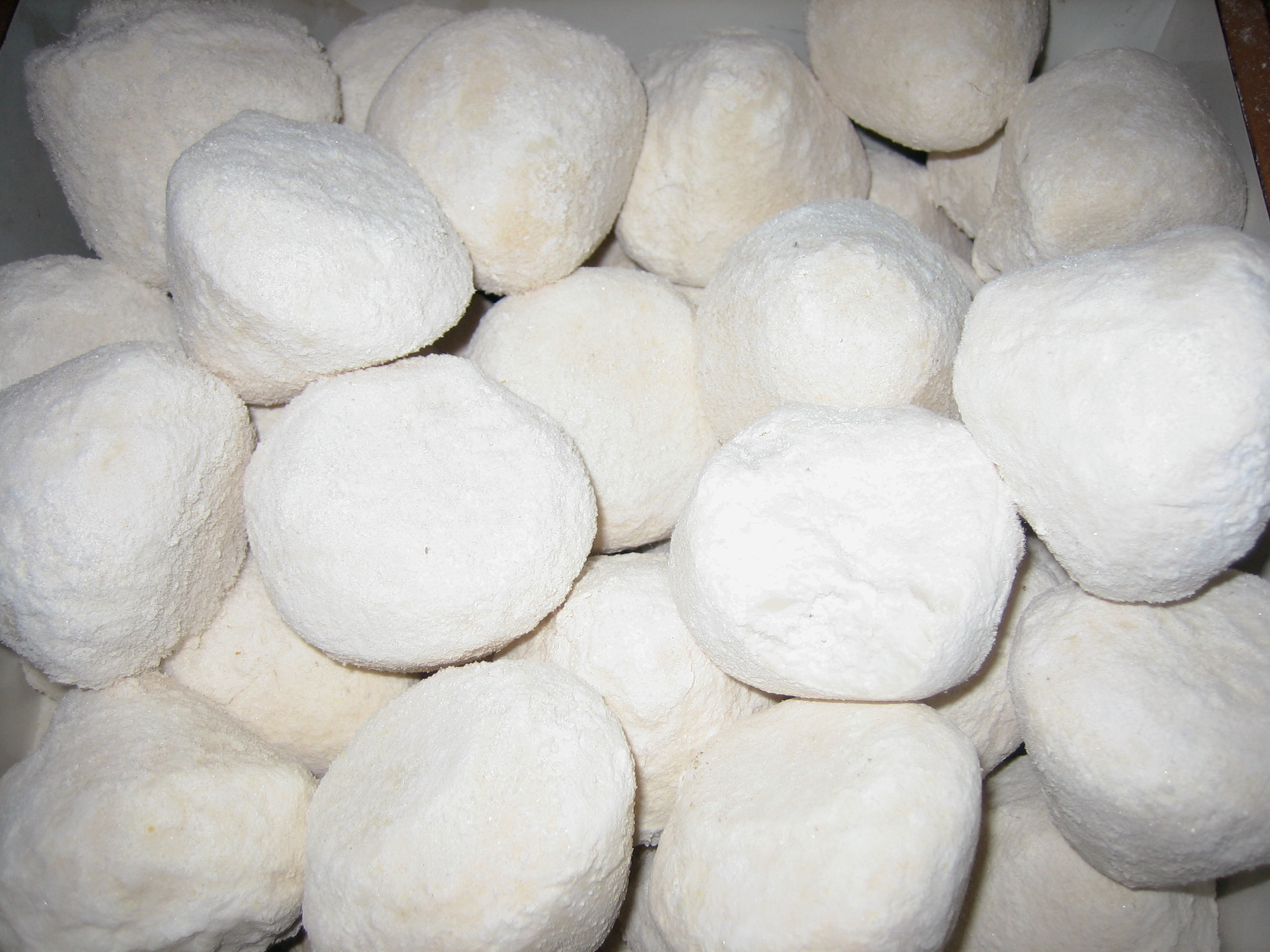
Al-Karak in Jordan is known to produce the highest quality of jameed.

Jameed is a hard dry yogurt that is prepared by the boiling of sheep or goat's milk, which is then left to dry and ferment. The mixture is later kept in a fine woven cheesecloth to make a thick yogurt. Salt is added daily to thicken the yogurt even more for a few days, which then becomes very dense and is shaped into round balls. The city of Al-Karak in Jordan has a reputation for producing the highest quality of jameed.

=== Serving ===
After the meat is cooked in the yogurt broth, often using jameed as its base, the dish is served on a large platter with a layer of flatbread (markook or shrak) topped with rice and then meat, garnished with almonds and pine nuts, and then the creamy yogurt sauce is poured on top of the dish. Jordanian mansaf typically includes a blend of spices and wild herbs called hwajeh (Arabic: حواجة).

== Culture and tradition ==
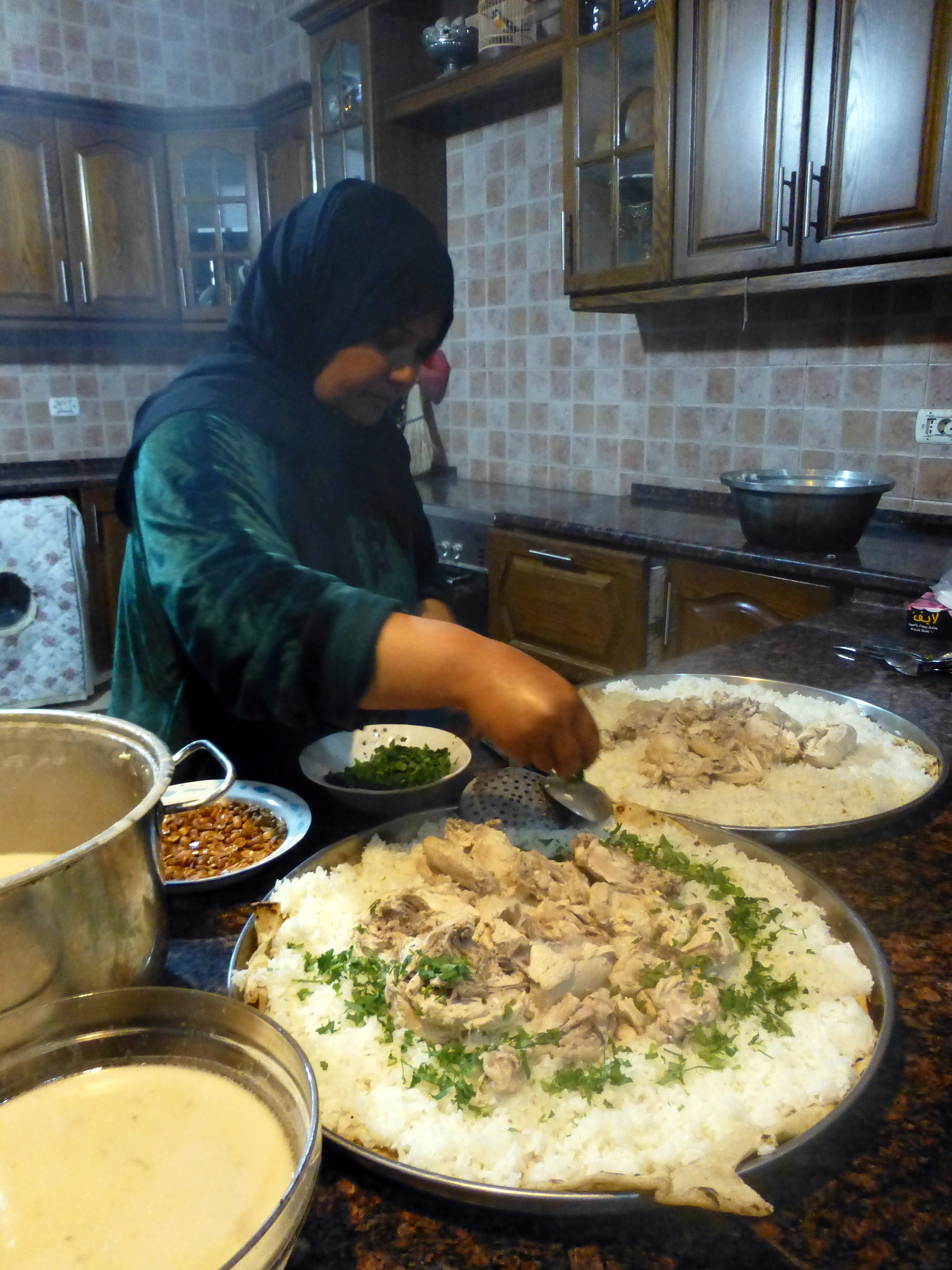
Woman in Petra preparing mansaf with lamb and chicken

Mansaf is associated with a traditional Jordanian culture based on an agro-pastoral lifestyle in which meat and yogurt are readily available. Mansaf is served on special occasions such as weddings, births and graduations, or to honor a guest, and on major holidays such as Eid ul-Fitr, Eid ul-Adha, Christmas, Easter and Jordan's Independence Day. It is traditionally eaten collectively from a large platter in the Bedouin and rural style, standing around the platter with the left hand behind the back and using the right hand instead of utensils. Mansaf plays an active role in settling tribal disputes in Jordan in what is known as an Atwa (truce) and a Ja'ha (peacemaking process). It is thought to signal the end of a conflict when the heads of conflicting tribes visit each other and the host sacrifices a sheep or a goat for a shared mansaf, taken to be a sign of reconciliation.

Since mansaf was originally popular among Bedouins, much of the traditions that they used with the dish still exist today. The tray containing mansaf is placed on a table where people gather around it while standing. Mansaf should be eaten with the use of a person's right hand only while the left is behind the person's back. The hand is used to create balls of rice and then the ball is placed in the mouth through the use of three fingers. It is frowned upon to blow on the ball of rice, regardless of how hot. Many of these traditions are still used; however, it can also be eaten with spoons and plates.

=== Jordan's national dish ===
Mansaf is frequently referred to as Jordan's "national dish" and its preparation and the traditions surrounding that are one of the country's intangible cultural heritage listings as recognized by UNESCO in 2022.

Joseph Massad writes that mansaf was promulgated as a national dish following the Independence of Jordan, and is portrayed by the state as a dish that is both national and a Bedouin tradition, despite it also historically being a dish of the peasants and Bedouins of the neighboring regions of southern Palestine and Syria.

== Regions and variants ==
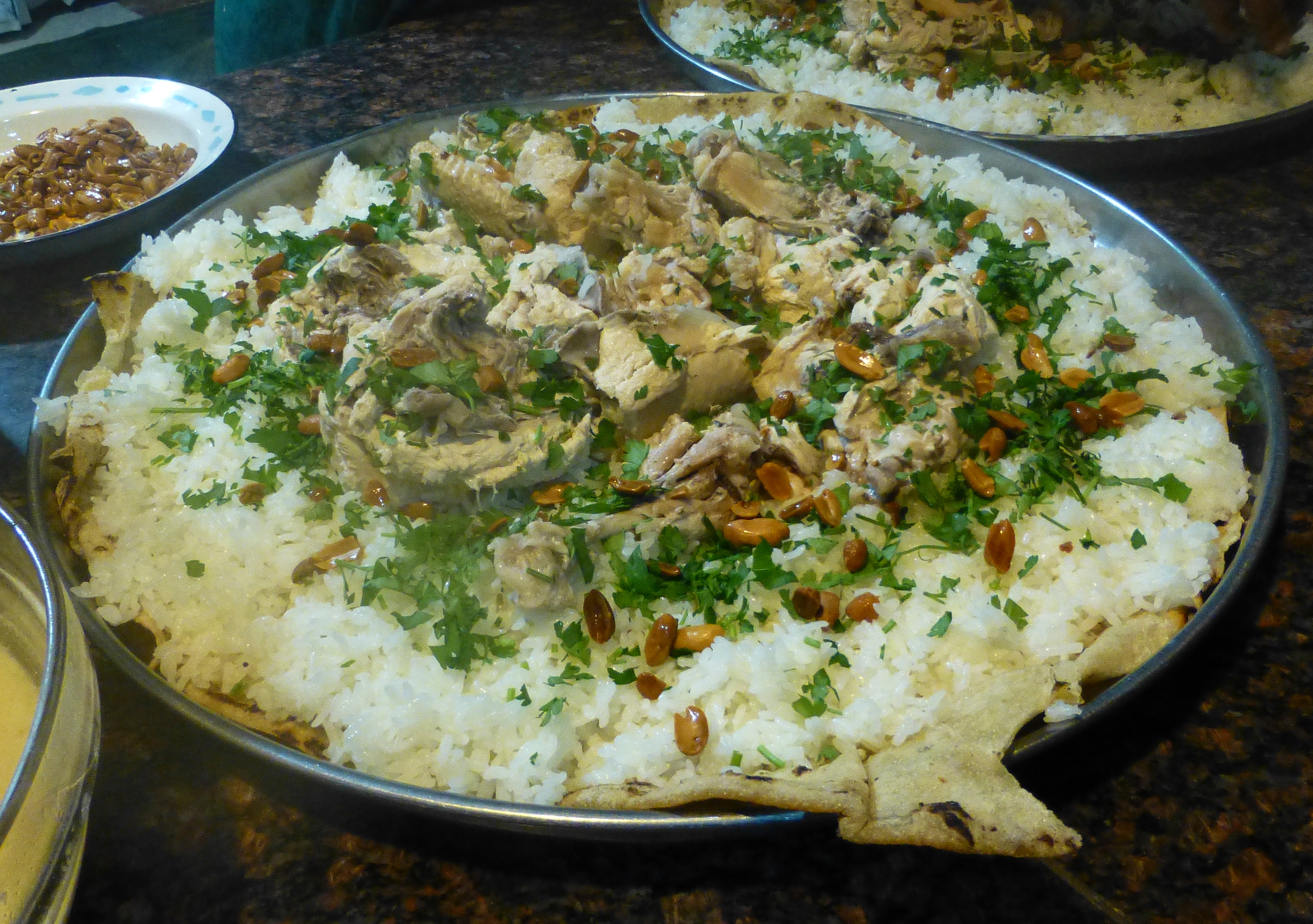
A variant of mansaf topped with parsley

The inhabitants of Al-Salt and Al-Karak are reputed to make the best mansaf in Jordan. In Palestine, Mansaf is the main dish of the central and southern areas of the West Bank and the Negev desert. Other variants of the dish also exist and are adapted to the regional tastes and circumstances. These include fish mansaf, found in the south around the port city of Aqaba. An urban, less ceremonial adaptation of mansaf using non-dried yogurt is called shakreyyeh or laban emmo. It is sometimes cooked with poultry instead of lamb and is common in Palestine, Lebanon, Syria and the northern part of Jordan. In the 2020s, a restaurateur in Amman began selling single servings of mansaf in cups. While some customers find it convenient, others find that it demeans the prestige and honor associated with it.

"Mansaf in a cup" is a contemporary street food variety of mansaf where the dish is served in a single paper cup meant to be eaten on-the-go rather than being served in a large platter meant for a group meal. This variety was met with controversy as some Jordanians saw it as inauthentic. It later spread to Palestine.

== Evolution ==
=== Evolution in the dish ===
Prior to 1945, mansaf was composed of three main components: the bread, the meat and the clarified butter. The bread that was used is called khobz al-shrak. It is a whole wheat bread that is described as "thick", "flat", "paper-thin" and "crumb-less". Mansaf was made using whole wheat flour because wheat was an easily accessible crop at the time. The specific type of bread varied based on local regions. The next main component of mansaf was the meat. It was boiled in water in order to clean it from dirt and film that developed on its surface. After the meat was fully cooked, it was added on top of the bread, and the meat broth was poured over the bread. The final step was pouring the clarified butter, called samin beladee, on top.

The first evolutions to change this initial recipe were a decrease in the amount of broth added to the base, and adding bulgur wheat to the meal. This is because bulgur became a widely grown crop around 1945. The wheat was cleaned, boiled, then spread on a clean surface and left to dry in the sun for a few days. Once the drying process was complete, the wheat was ground up, which is what turns it into bulgur wheat. Finally, the bulgur wheat was cooked similar to how rice is cooked today.

Around the 1950s, replacing bulgur wheat with rice started to rise in popularity when making mansaf, due to the proximity of a city in Jordan called Hartha to Syrian and Palestinian borders. This resulted in better access to trade networks.

In the early 1960s, new toppings were introduced to the recipe of mansaf. Those include roasted almonds and pine nuts. A few years after that, the clarified butter and the broth were replaced with jameed, which is a yogurt sauce. People also started cooking the meat in this yogurt sauce, which resulted in a more "robust flavor" which marinated the meat during the cooking process.

=== Evolution in the preparation process ===
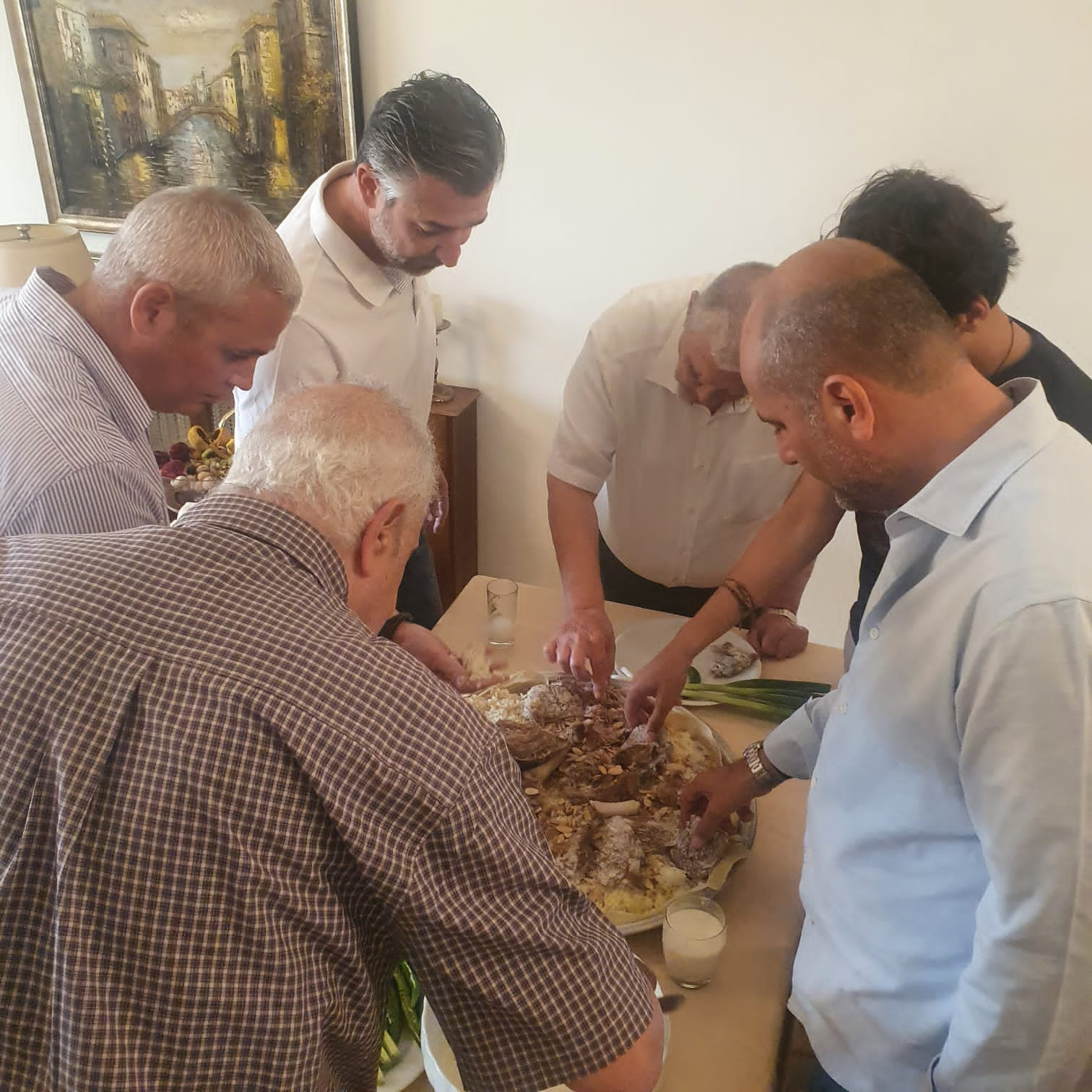
A Jordanian family enjoying mansaf for lunch.

Prior to the 1970s, mansaf was cooked in a large copper cauldron that was placed over a fire in the courtyards of one's home. The cauldron was so large that people had no choice but to cook the dish outdoors. Once the ingredients were fully cooked, they would be placed on a large copper platter and carried indoors.

After the 1970s, many changes occurred to the original recipe and preparation of mansaf. The bread was replaced with rice, and the platter used for the mansaf changed from traditional copper to a florally decorated enamelware or aluminum platter. These changes happened due to advancements in technology, which made it possible for mansaf to be cooked indoors, in smaller amounts for smaller groups of people like families.

== See also ==
- Jordanian cuisine
- List of lamb dishes
- Palestinian cuisine
