= Jordanian wine =

Wine making in Jordan

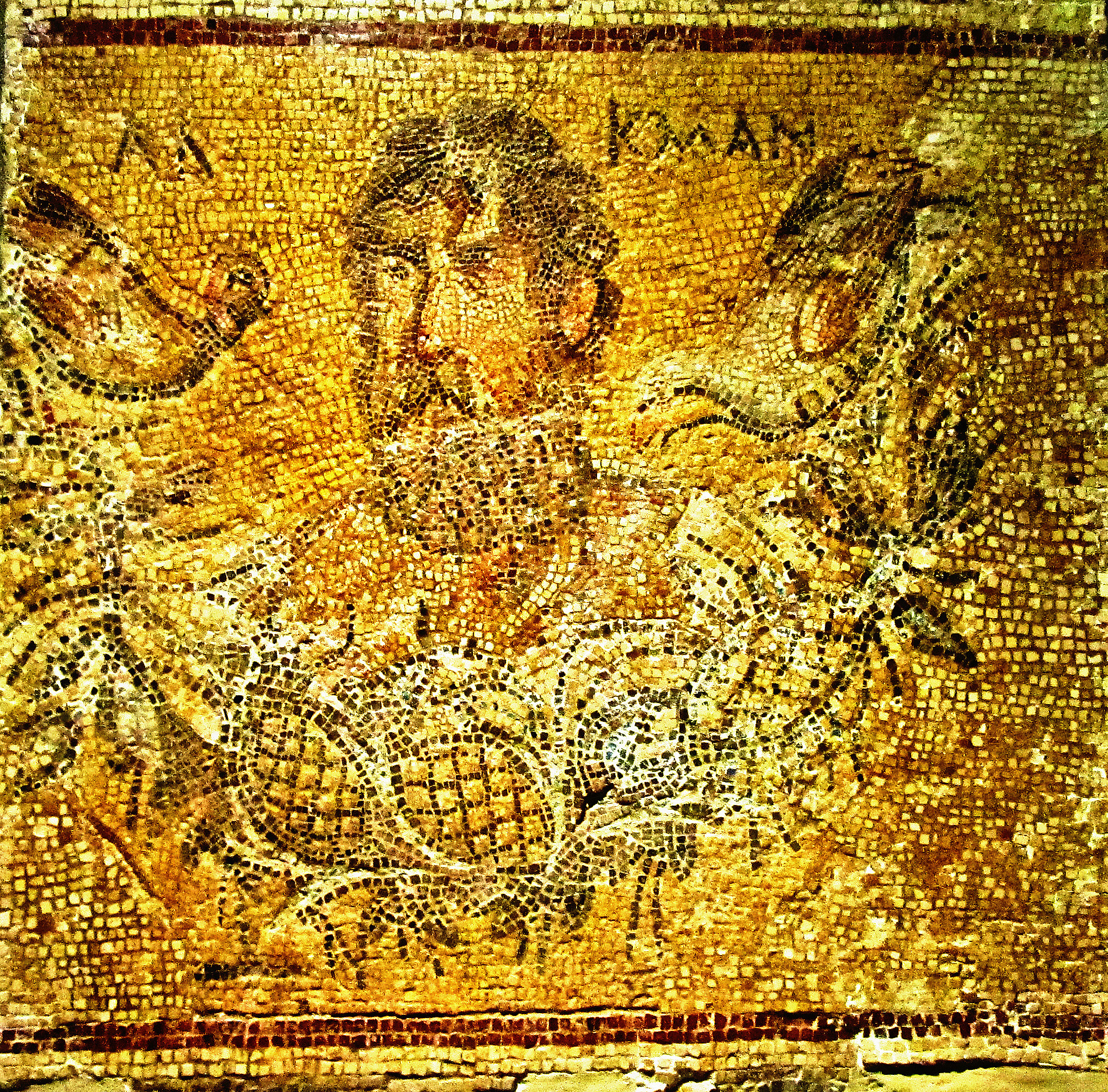
Roman mosaic in Jerash, Jordan showing the Greek poet Alcman drinking wine. Late 2nd-3rd century AD

Jordanian wine is produced by two wineries, with an annual production of nearly a million bottles a year. Jordan has a long tradition of wine making, dating as far back as Nabatean times.

Archaeological digs near Petra have uncovered at least 82 wine presses of industrial scale dating back to Nabatean times. Several sources suggest that the wine served to Jesus during the Last Supper came from Umm Qais in Northern Jordan.

The modern wine industry in Jordan was established in 1975 by the Haddad distilling company. Two wineries exist in Jordan today. Zumot and Haddad producing Saint George and Jordan River wines respectively. Both wineries have their vineyards in Mafraq in northern Jordan, where the high elevation, underground water and basalt-rich soil provide suitable conditions.

The two companies have an estimated annual production of a million liters a year, most of which is for domestic consumption. In 2018, it was reported that the Jordan River wines had won 96 awards, and the Saint George claimed 23 prizes.

== Grape varieties ==
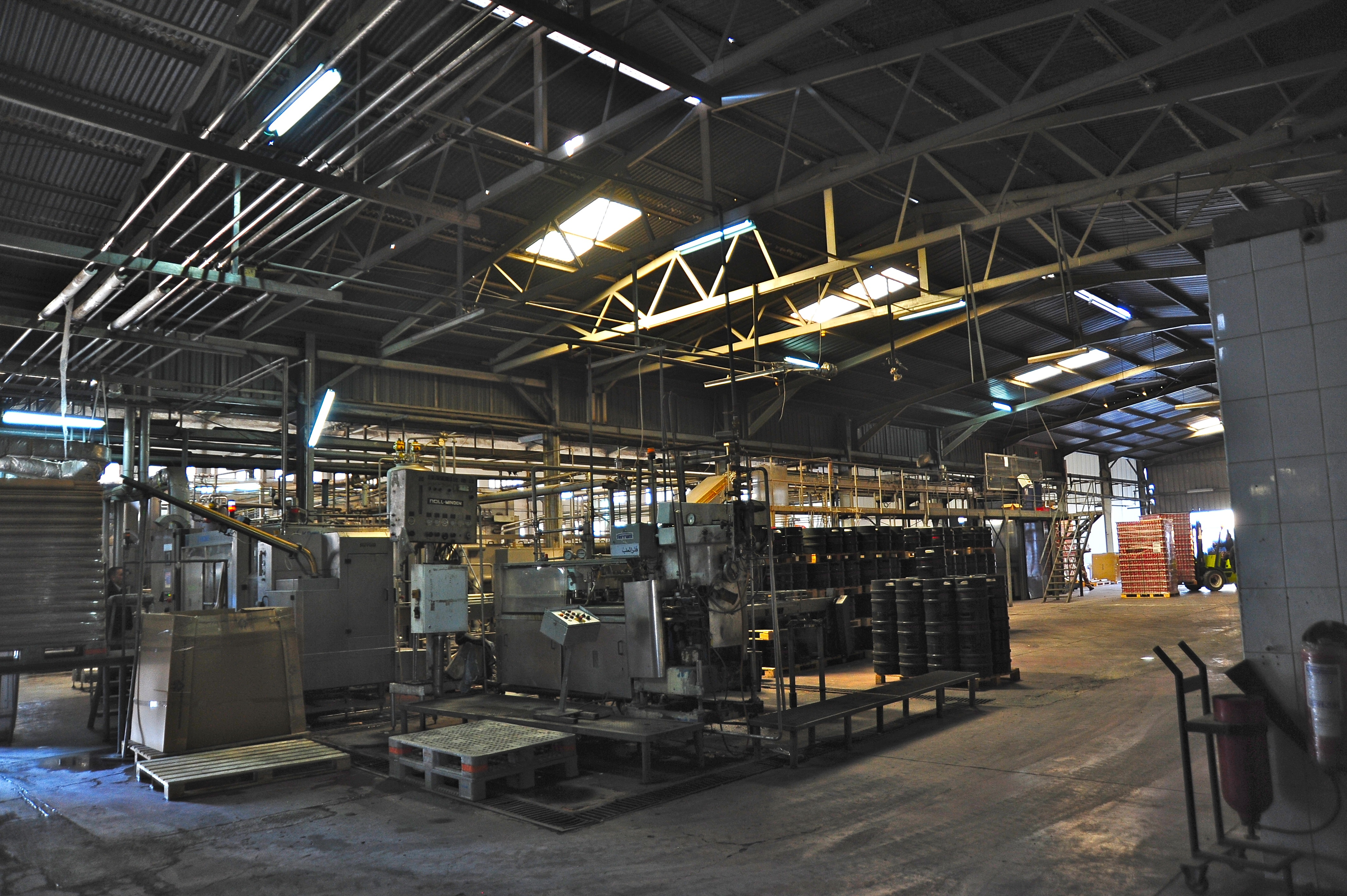
One of the wineries is located in the city of Zarqa.

The traditional local grape varieties appear to have been lost. Jordanian wines are therefore of necessity made from imported varieties of Vitis vinifera. Red wines are made using Cabernet Sauvignon, Merlot, Shiraz and Pinot noir. White wines are made using Chardonnay, Muscat, Pinot gris, Gewürztraminer and Chenin blanc.

In 2013, Carménère grapes of Chilean origin, and Tocai grapes from Italy, were being grown at Omar Zumot's vineyard in Northern Jordan. Zumot's award-winning wines are labelled "Saint George" and "Machaerus". The Haddad winery makes white wines labelled "Mount Nebo" and both red and white wines labelled "Jordan River".

== See also ==
- Beer in Jordan
- Agriculture in Jordan
- Winemaking
