= Joshpara =

Central Asian dumpling dish

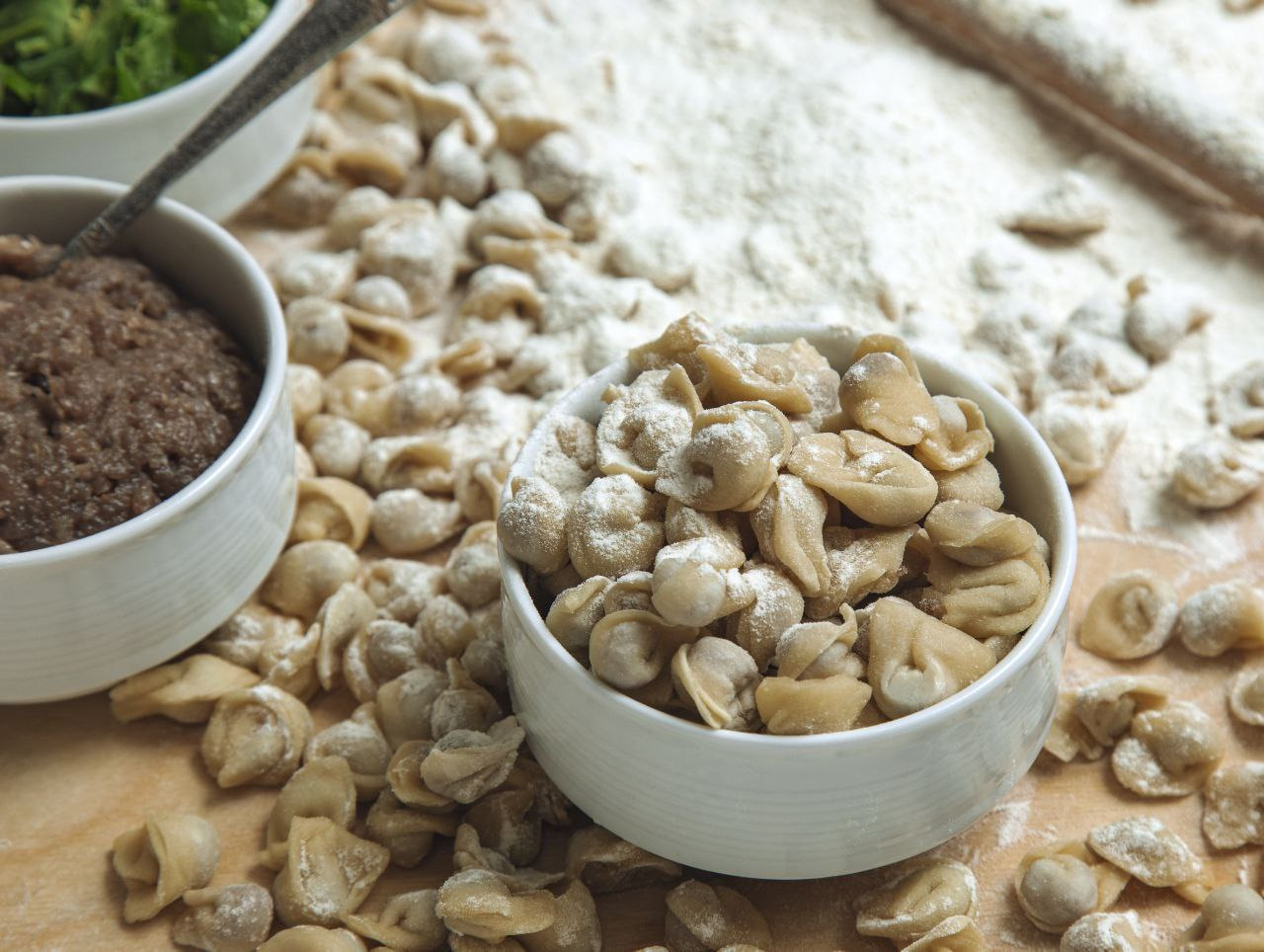
- Düşbərə prepared for cooking
- Alternative names: Chuchvara, chüchüre, chüchpara, düshbärä, shishbarak, shushbarak, şişbörek, tatarbari, tushbera, tushpara
- Type: Dumpling
- Region or state: West Asia, Central Asia
- Serving temperature: Hot or cold
- Main ingredients: Dough (flour, eggs, water, salt), ground meat, onions, herbs, salt, black pepper

Joshpara is a kind of dumpling popular in Central Asia, South Caucasus and the Middle East. They are made of unleavened wheat dough squares filled with ground meat and condiments.

== Etymology ==
According to food historian Charles Perry, the first element of the word, josh, means "to boil" in Persian, while the second element, para, is uncertain, possibly meaning "bit".

The word was commonly used prior to the 10th century, during which it was pronounced joshparag. The earlier form was adapted by the Arabs with the pronunciation shushbarak (Arabic: شُشْبَرَك) or shishbarak (Arabic: شيشبرك). Perry suggests that the latter shishbarak was reinterpreted through a folk etymology connecting it with shish ("skewer") and börek, a Turkish term for stuffed dough dishes. Medieval Kipchak sources record şiş börek for pieces of dough stuffed with meat that are cooked on a skewer.

In modern Persian, joshpara has been replaced by gosh-e barreh (Persian: گوش بره), literally “lamb's ear”, referring to the dumpling's shape. Perry notes that this reinterpretation among Persians was encouraged by the absence of a clearly analyzable meaning.

There are several variations of the name in other languages including Azerbaijani (düşbərə, dushbara), Bashkir (сөсбәрә, süsbərə) Kazakh (тұшпара, tushpara), Kyrgyz (чүчпара, chuchpara), Tajik (тушбера, tushbera), Turkish (şiş börek), Uzbek (chuchvara) and Uyghur (چۆچۈرە, chöchürä).

Another theory about the words' etymology is that the word comes from the Turkic word düşbərə. The words tosh and dash mean "filled up" and "spill out", and berek means "food" (dishes made from dough). This alludes to the fact that düşbərə should be added in when the water is boiling and spilling out of the saucepan.

A common Azerbaijani joke suggests that the word comes from “düş bəri”, which means "fall here": in other words, asking to fill the spoon with as many dumplings as possible.

== History ==
Shishbarak is mentioned in 13th and 15th Century Egyptian cookbooks. The 13th-century Arabic cookbook Kitab al-Wuslah ila l-habib references the name and shape of shushbarak but does not provide a recipe for it.

According to historian Daniel Newman, it was possibly imported into Egypt by Turkic tribes from the Central Asian Steppes.

Shishbarak (ششبرك) was described in the proceedings of the International Congress of Orientalists from 1889-1891, which cite the cookbook 1885 Ustadh al-Tabbakhin by author Khalil Khattar Sarkis. The dish is described as a small dumpling filled with meat, onions and coriander, which is cooked in meat broth and sour milk.

== Regional variations ==
=== Arab cuisines ===
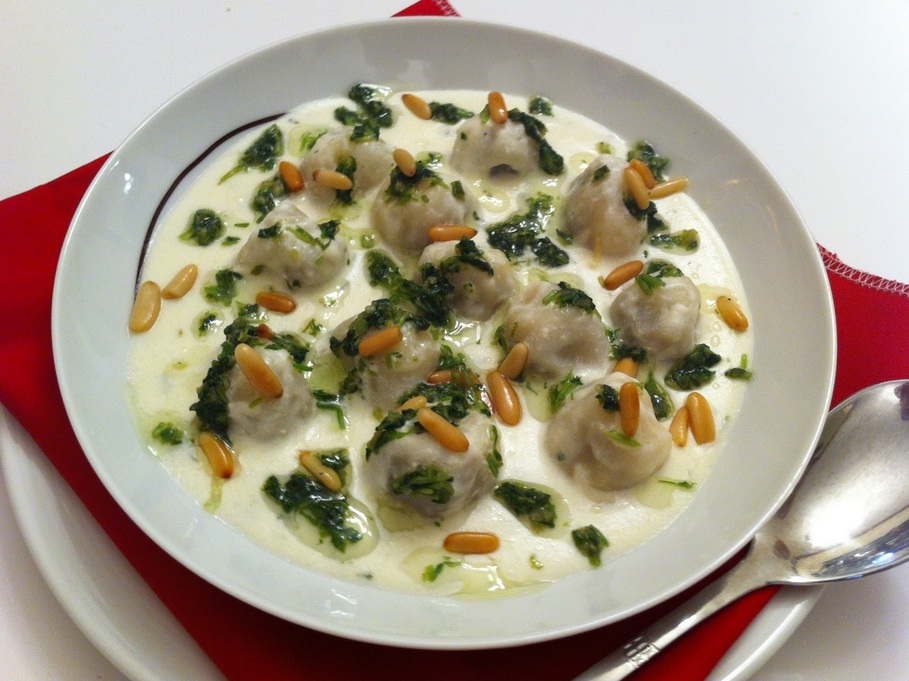
Levantine shishbarak served in yogurt sauce

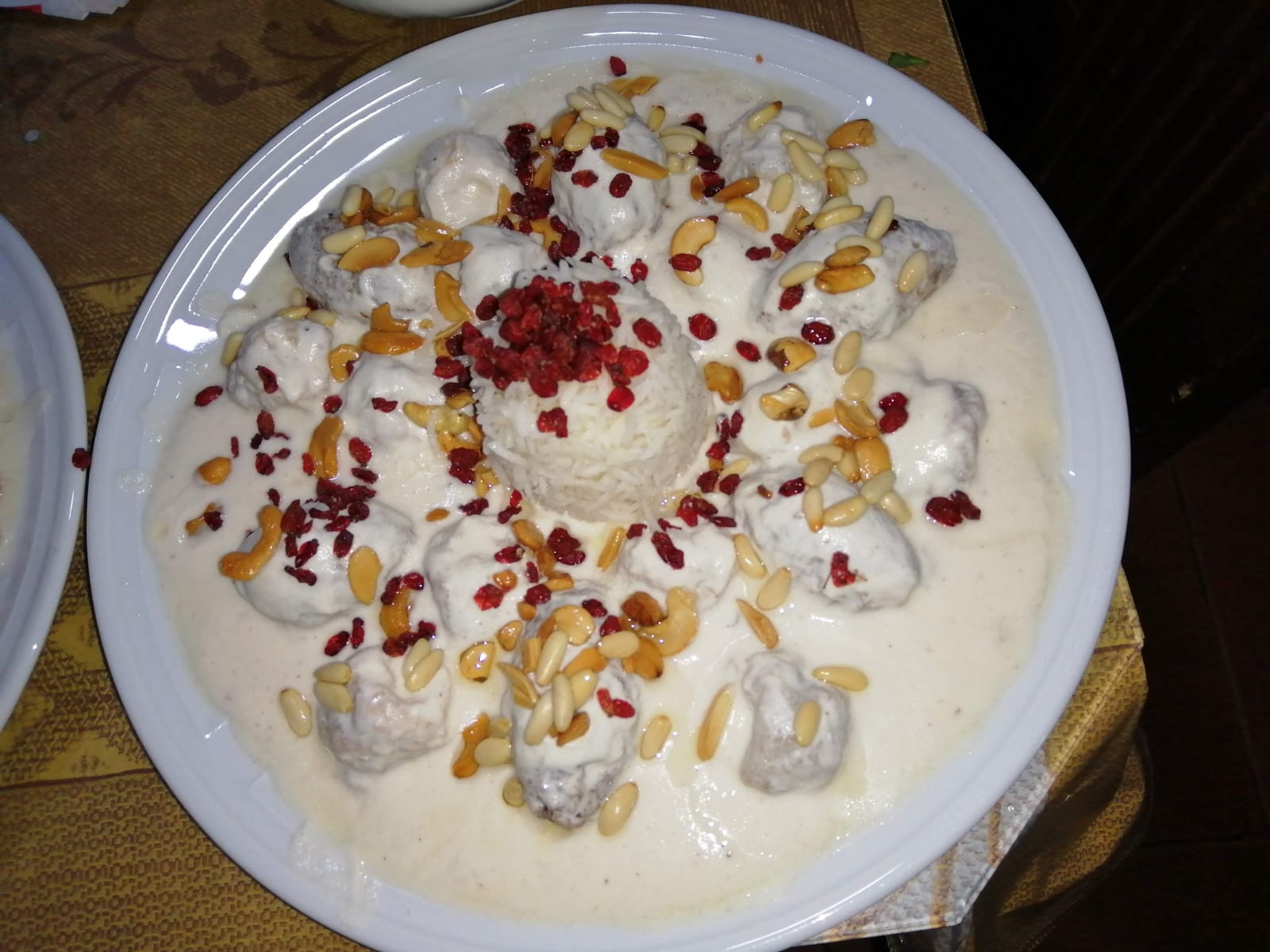
Lebanese style kibbeh with shushbarak

Shishbarak is prepared in Iraq, Palestine, Lebanon, Syria, Jordan, Hejaz, and the northern area of Saudi Arabia. After being stuffed with ground beef and spices, thin dough parcels are cooked in yogurt and served hot in their sauce. A part of Arab cuisine for centuries, a recipe for shushbarak appears in the 15th century Arabic cookbook from Damascus, Kitab al-tibakha.

In some areas in Palestine, such as Hebron, it is called dnein qtat (Arabic: دنين قطاط, lit. 'cat ears') because of their shape, and they are traditionally made with kashk or jameed.

Al basha w asakro (Arabic: الباشا وعساكره, lit. 'The pasha and his soldiers') is a Damascene dish made with kibbeh and shishbarak cooked in the same yogurt.

=== Turkic and Persian cuisines ===
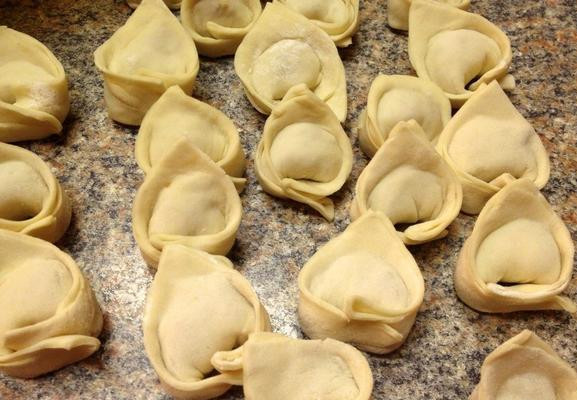
Uncooked chuchvara

The dish is found in Azerbaijani, Iranian, Tajik, Turkish, Uzbek, Uyghur, and other Central Asian cuisines.

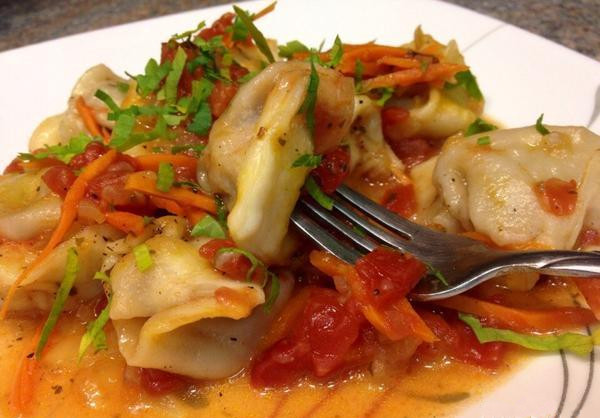
Uzbek chuchvara with tomato sauce and vegetables

The dough for Central Asian chuchvara or tushbera is made with flour, eggs, water, and salt. It is rolled into a thin layer, and cut into squares. A dollop of meat filling, seasoned with chopped onions, black pepper, salt and thyme, is placed at the center of each square, and the corners of the dumpling are pinched and folded. The dumplings are boiled in meat broth until they rise to the surface. Chuchvara can be served in a clear soup or on their own, with either vinegar or sauce based on finely chopped greens, tomatoes and hot peppers. Another popular way of serving chuchvara is to top the dumplings with syuzma (strained qatiq) or with smetana (sour cream). The latter is known as Russian-style.

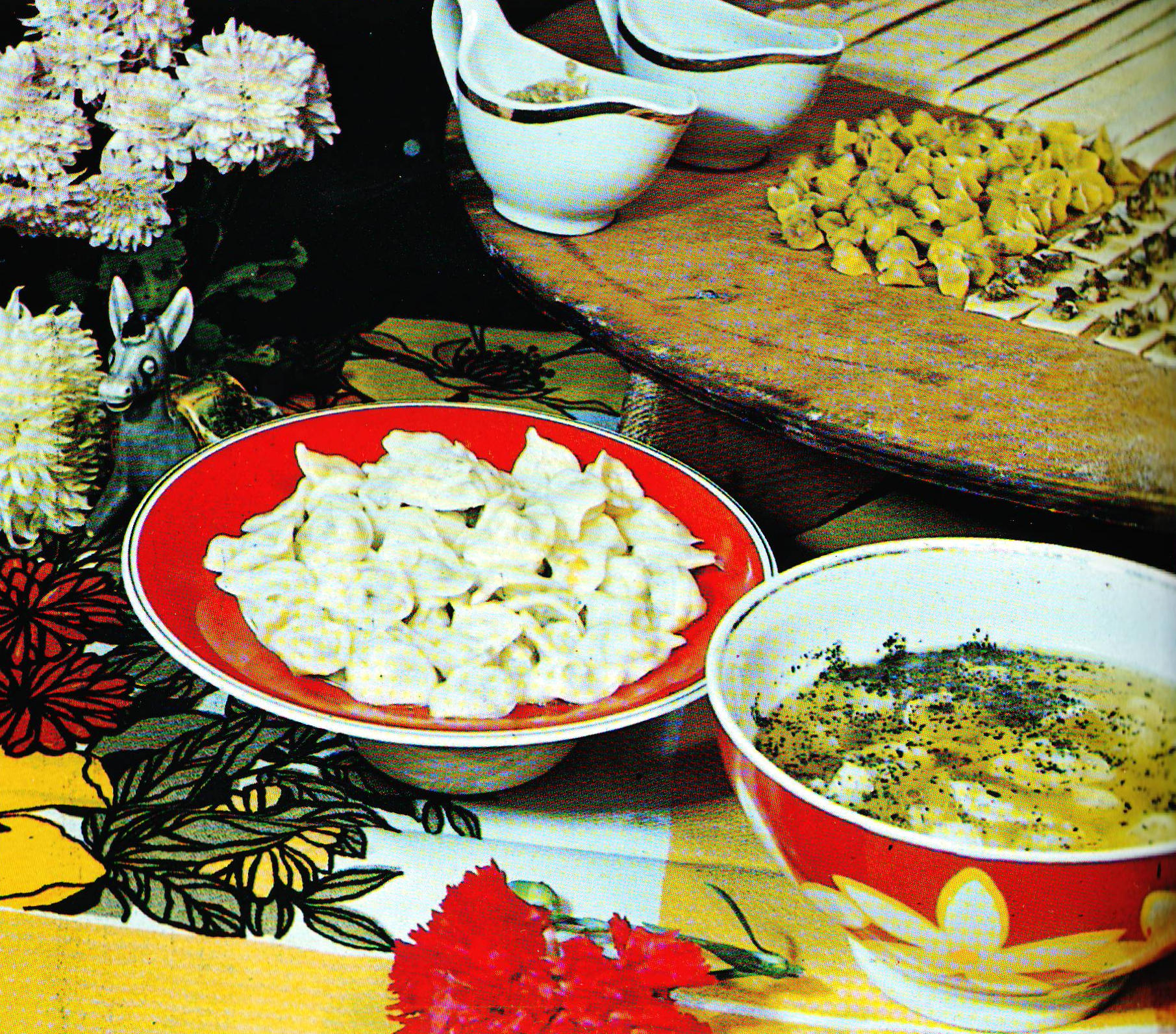
Azerbaijani düşbərə served in broth

In Azerbaijan, the dumplings are smaller and the dough is thicker. Düşbərə are typically made from dough (wheat flour, egg, water), mutton (boneless), onions, vinegar, dried mint, pepper, and salt. The dish is prepared either with water or meat broth. Mutton can be substituted with beef, or even with chicken. The broth is made from mutton bones, and the ground meat is prepared with onions and spices. The dough is then rolled, cut into small squares, and stuffed with ground meat. The squares are wrapped like triangles and the edges are pasted together, making shell-shaped figures. The dumplings are added into the boiling salty water and cooked until the dumplings come to the surface. Düşbərə are served with sprinkled dried mint. Vinegar mixed with shredded garlic is added or served separately to taste. 5-8 düşbərəs typically fit on a spoon; however, in rural areas of Absheron, they are made small enough that a spoon can hold as many as 20.

== Related dishes ==
- Finno-Ugric peoples in Western Siberia were exposed to the dish by Iranian merchants during the Middle Ages and named it pelnan, meaning "ear bread". It was adopted in Russia in the 17th century, where the dish is referred to as pelmeni.
- Manti is another type of dumpling popular in Central and West Asia.

== See also ==
- List of dumplings
- List of stuffed dishes
