= Palestinian cuisine =

Culinary traditions of Palestine

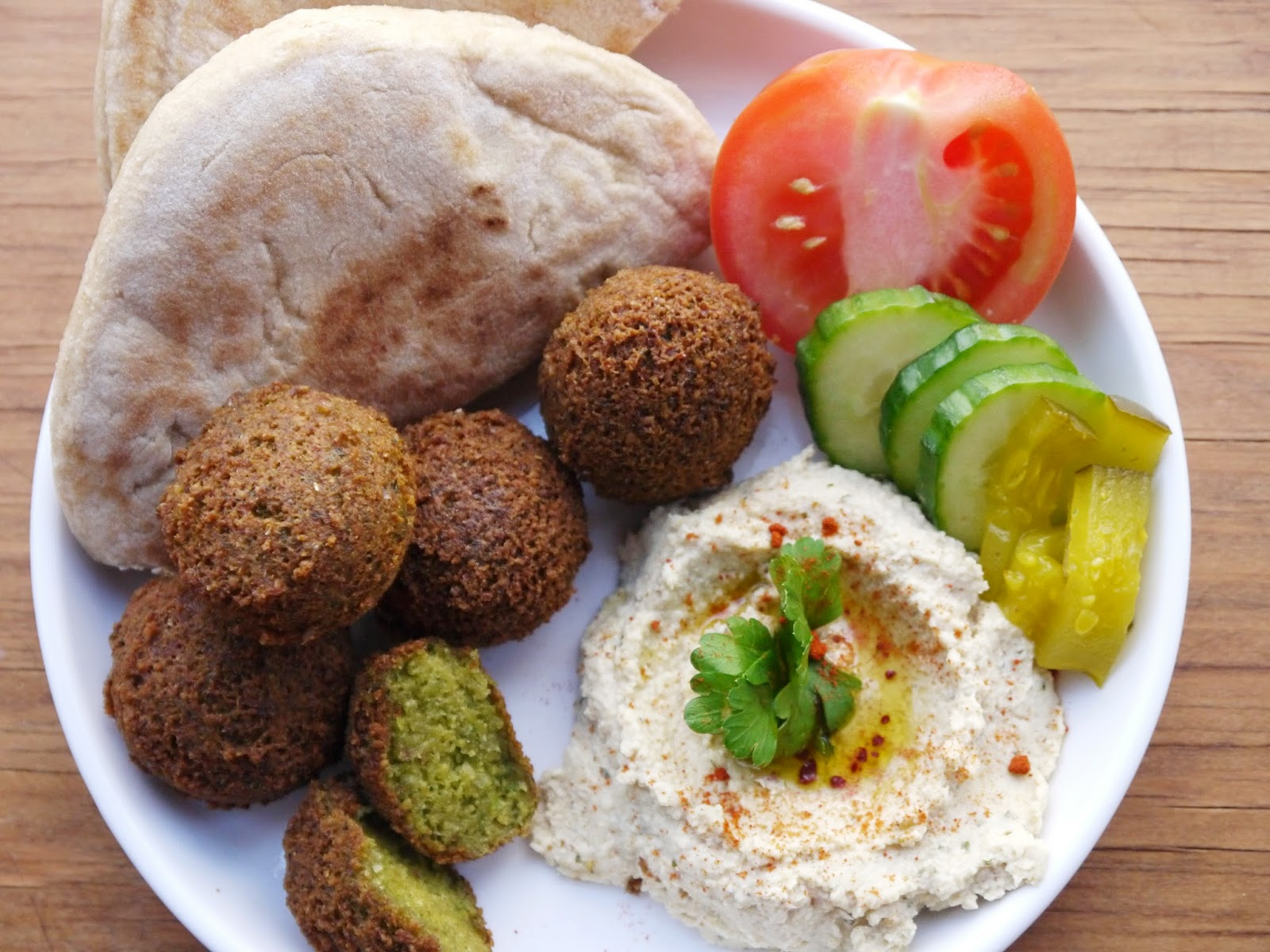
A Palestinian breakfast, with falafel and hummus.

Palestinian cuisine consists of foods from or commonly eaten by Palestinians or in the region of Palestine, whether in Palestine, Israel, Jordan, or refugee camps in nearby countries, or by the Palestinian diaspora. The cuisine is a diffusion of the cultures of civilizations that settled in the region of Palestine, particularly during and after the Islamic era beginning with the Arab Umayyad conquest, then the eventual Persian-influenced Abbasids and ending with the strong influences of Turkish cuisine, resulting from the coming of the Ottoman Turks. It is similar to other Levantine cuisines, including Lebanese, Syrian and Jordanian.

Rice and variations of kibbee are common in the Galilee. West Bank cuisine consists of taboon bread, rice and meat, while fish and lentils are staples on the coast. Gaza cuisine is more diverse in terms of seafood and spices, with widespread use of chili peppers.

The area is also home to many desserts, ranging from those made regularly and those that are commonly reserved for the holidays. Most Palestinian sweets are pastries filled with either sweetened cheeses, dates or various nuts such as almonds, walnuts or pistachios. Beverages could also depend on holidays such as during Ramadan, when carob, tamarind and apricot juices are consumed at sunset. Coffee is consumed throughout the day and liquor is not very prevalent among the population; however, some alcoholic beverages such as arak or beer are consumed by Christians and some Muslims.

== History ==
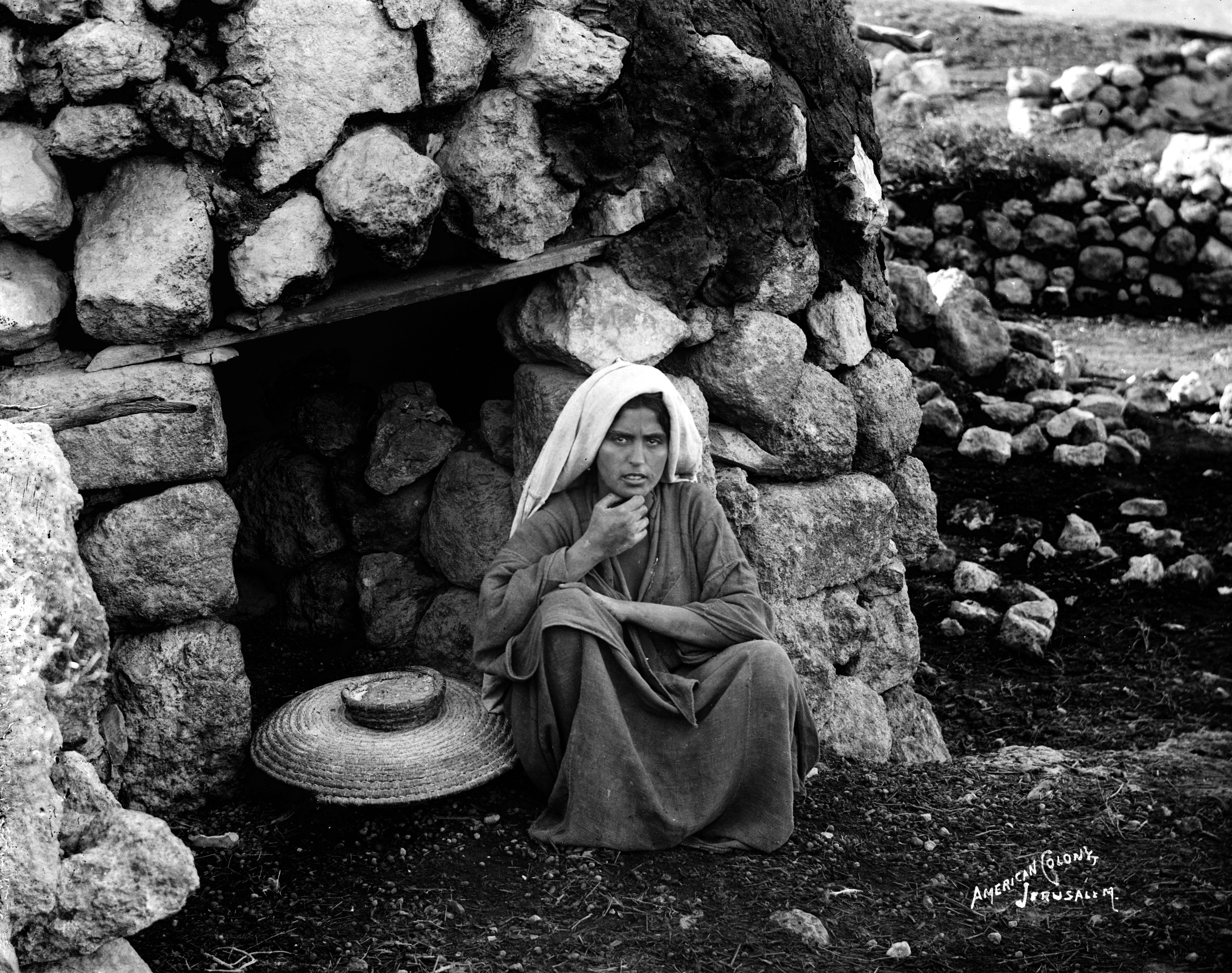
Village oven, taboun, in Palestine. Photo taken between 1898 and 1914 by American Colony, Jerusalem.

The region of the southern Levant has a varied past and as such, its cuisine has contributions from various cultures.

After the area originally inhabited by Jews, Edomites, Moabites and Ammonites was conquered by the Muslims in the 7th century CE, it became part of a Bilad al-Sham under the name Jund Filastin. Therefore, many aspects of Palestinian cuisine are similar to the cuisine of Syria—especially in the Galilee. Modern Syrian-Palestinian dishes have been generally influenced by the rule of three major Islamic groups: the Arabs, the Persian-influenced Arabs (Iraqis) and the Turks.

The Arabs that conquered Syria and Palestine initially had simple culinary traditions primarily based on the use of rice, lamb, yogurt and dates. This cuisine did not advance for centuries until the rise of the Abbasid Caliphate, that established Baghdad as its capital and integrated elements of Persian cuisine into the existing Arab cuisine. The Jerusalemite geographer al-Muqaddasi said this of Palestine's foods:

From Palestine comes olives, dried figs, raisins, the carob fruit... from Jerusalem comes cheeses and the celebrated raisins of the species known as Ainuni and Duri, excellent apples... also pine nuts of the kind called 'Kuraish-bite', and their equal is not found elsewhere... from Sughar and Baysan come dates, the treacle called Dibs.

The cuisine of the Ottoman Empire—which incorporated Palestine in 1516—was partially made up of what had become, by then a "rich" Arab cuisine. After the Crimean War, in 1855, many other communities including Bosnians, Greeks, French and Italians began settling in the area especially in urban centers such as Jerusalem, Jaffa and Bethlehem. These communities' cuisines contributed to the character of Palestinian cuisine, especially communities from the Balkans. The shared religious-identity between the Ottomans and the local Muslim population also facilitated cultural transfer.

=== 20th century ===
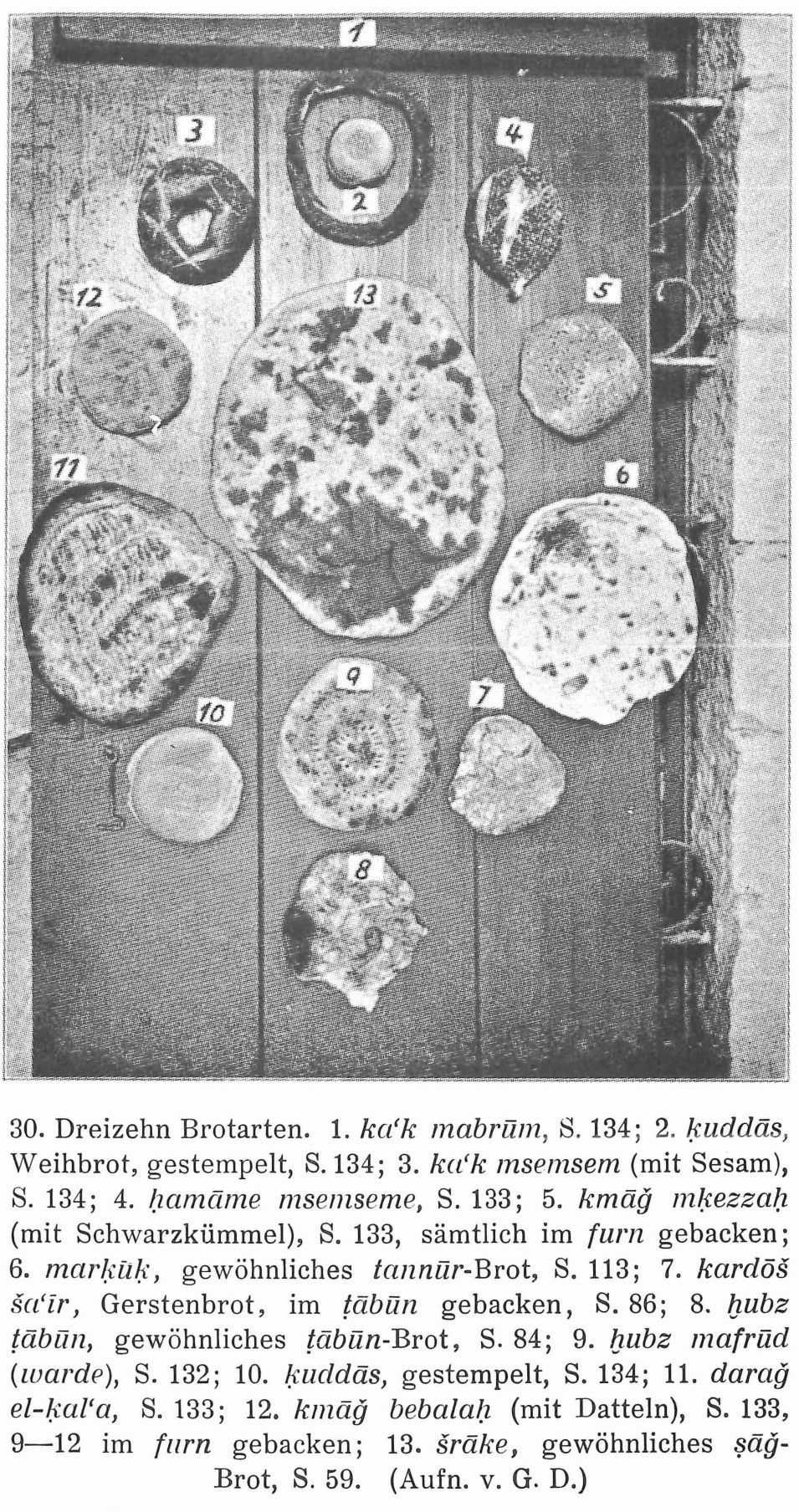
12 types of bread found in Palestine, from Gustaf Dalman's 1936 Arbeit und Sitte in Palaestina ("Work and Customs in Palestine")

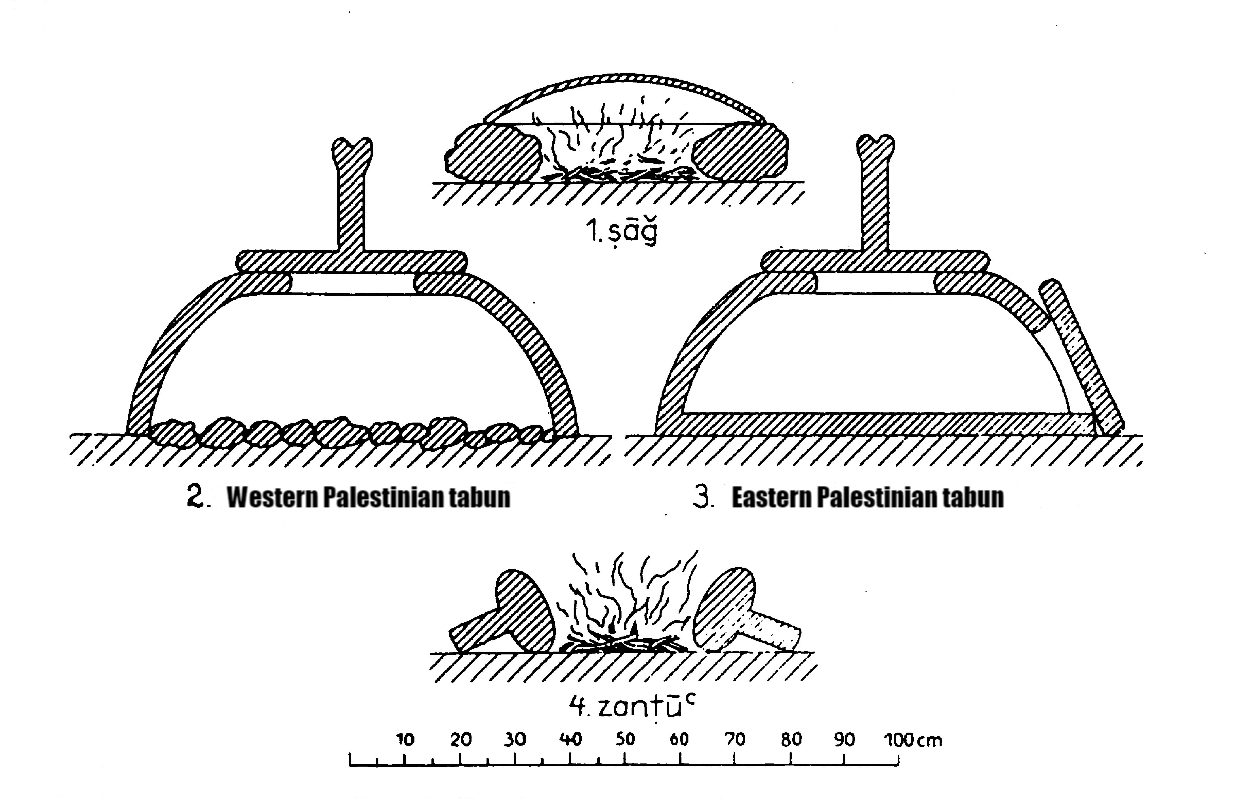
Baking ovens in Palestine, as documented by Dalman: 1. saj, 2. and 3. tabun

The Palestine Exploration Funds 1903 Quarterly Statement reported on several culinary trades in Palestine, including:

- Bakers; who baked dough for townspeople in a furn in exchange for payment. It was noted that country people tended to use tannurs instead, and that townspeople never baked at home.
- Confectioners (halawany), who sold ma'amoul (besides those made at home for Easter), karabeej Halab, mutabaq, knafeh, and raha.
- Street sellers of bread, who also sold "cakes" of white flour bread coated with toasted sesame seeds, distinct from unleavened kaʿk.
- Butchers; who chopped meat finely for use in mahashi, described as "the favorite dish of all townspeople".

Author G. Robinson Lees, writing in 1905, observed that "The oven is not in the house, it has a building of its own, the joint property of several families whose duty is to keep it always hot." People of Palestine, a 1921 book by American scholar Elihu Grant described the culinary tradition of the Palestinian fallahin (peasants) as follows: The primary cooking fats were samneh, olive oil, and sesame oil. Common dishes included hummus bi-tahineh, eggplant maklouba, mujaddara with fried onions, mahshy of stuffed courgette, eggplant, lamb and chicken, kibbeh cooked in samneh. A variety of wild plants were foraged for food. People generally ate with bread and from a common plate. Guests are customarily served preserves (like jams), fruits, and lastly coffee.

The 1946 Survey of Palestine found that Palestinian Arabs primarily consumed mutton whereas the Jewish population preferred beef, it also noted small amounts of pork being imported mainly for consumption by Palestinian Christians.

During the 20th century, Palestinians began incorporating more rice into their diets; dishes traditionally prepared with bulgur or freekeh like mujaddara or maqluba were adapted to use rice instead. Until around the 1950s–1960s, the main ingredients for rural Palestinian cuisine were olive oil, oregano and bread baked in a simple oven called a taboon.

== Regional cuisines ==
There are three primary culinary regions in historical Palestine—the Galilee, Gaza and the West Bank (which has its own culinary subregions ranging from north to south). In the Galilee, bulgur and meat (beef or lamb) are primary ingredients that are often combined to form several variations of dishes ranging from a family-sized meal to a side dish. However, in the West Bank and the Gaza Strip, the populations have a cooking style of their own. In the West Bank, meals are particularly heavy and contrast from the foods of the northern Levant. Main dishes involve rice, flatbreads and roasted meats. The staple food of the inhabitants in the Gaza Strip is fish due to its location on the Mediterranean seacoast. Their culinary influences are also strongly affected by traditional Egyptian cooking and chili peppers, dill seeds and garlic are the most common seasonings. Although the cuisine is diverse, generally Palestinians are not restricted to the foods of their specific region and there is constant culinary diffusion amongst them—although, because of Gaza's isolation from other Palestinian and Levantine Arab areas, their cooking styles are less known in the region.

=== Galilee ===
The Galilee is highly influenced by Lebanese cuisine, due to extensive communication between the two regions before the establishment of Israel. The Galilee specializes in a number of meals based on the combination of bulgur, spices and meat, known as kibbee by Arabs. Kibbee bi-siniyyeh|Kibbee bi-siniyee is a combination of minced lamb or beef mixed with pepper, allspice and other spices wrapped in a bulgur crust, then baked. Kibee bi-siniyee could serve as the main dish during a Palestinian lunch. Kibbee neyee is a variation of kibee that is served as raw meat mixed with bulgur and a variety of spices. It is mostly eaten as a side dish and pita or markook bread is used for scooping the meat. Its leftovers are usually cooked as a different meal the next day, such as fried kibbee balls.

A specific rice meal, called pilaf, is common in the Galilee and consists of a mixture of rice with chopped lamb and pine nuts flavored with an assortment of spices, accompanied by a lamb leg or whole chickens. In addition, a variety of dishes made up of meatballs and potatoes are eaten during special occasions. Shish kebab or lahme mashwi and shish taouk are grilled meats on skewers and are commonly eaten after an array of appetizers known as the mezze.

=== West Bank ===
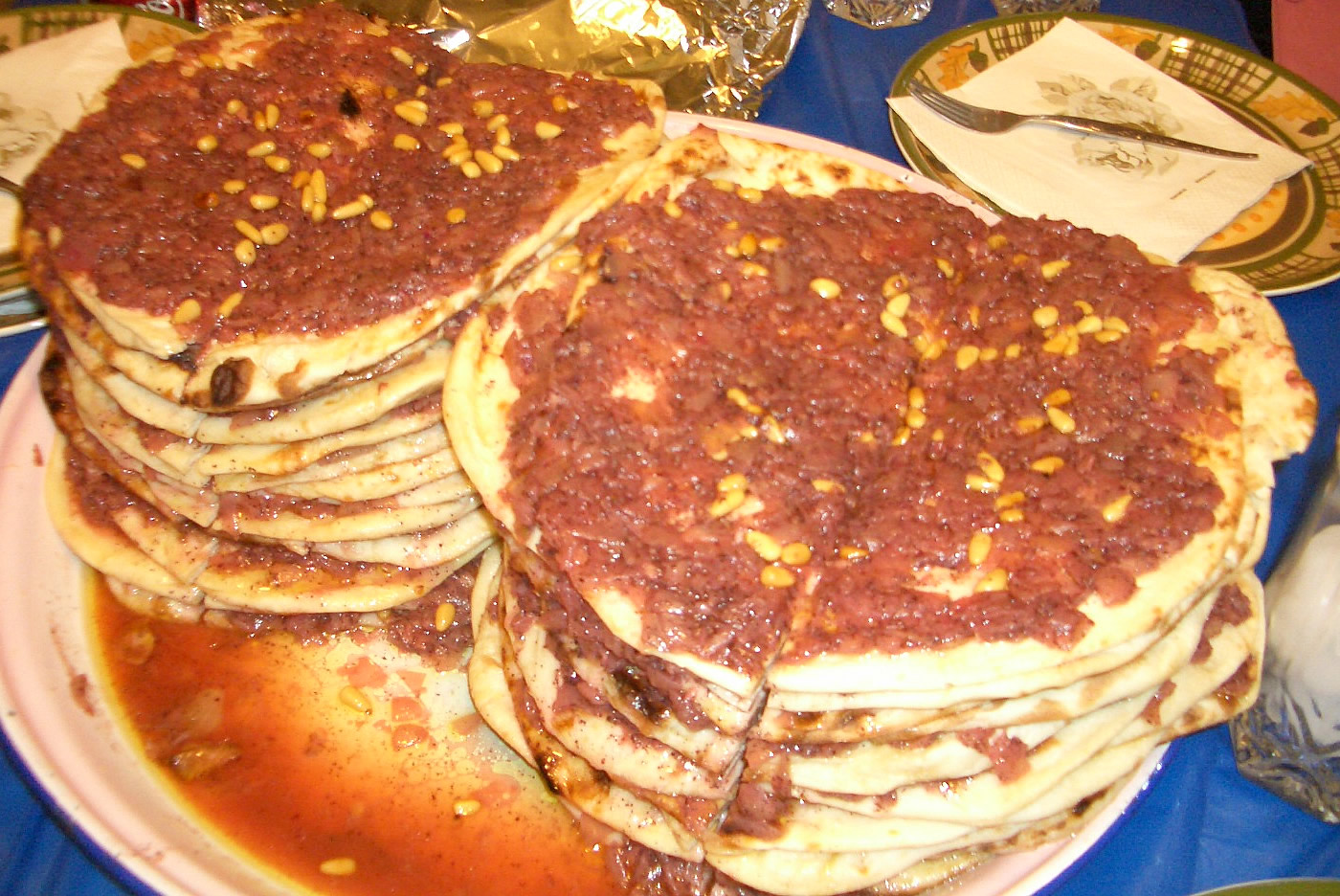
Musakhan

Musakhan is a common main dish that originated in the Jenin and Tulkarm area in the northern West Bank. It consists of a roasted chicken over a taboon bread that has been topped with pieces of fried sweet onions, sumac, allspice and pine nuts. Maqluba is an upside-down rice and baked eggplant casserole mixed with cooked cauliflower, carrots and chicken or lamb. The meal is known throughout the Levant but among Palestinians especially. It dates back to the 13th century.

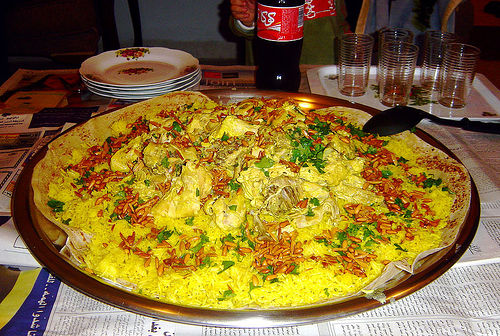
Mansaf

Mansaf is a traditional meal in the central West Bank and Naqab region in the southern West Bank, having its roots from the Bedouin population of Jordan. It is mostly cooked on occasions such as holidays, weddings or large gatherings. Mansaf is cooked as a lamb leg or large pieces of lamb on top of a taboon bread that has usually been smothered with yellow rice. A type of thick and dried cheesecloth yogurt from goat's milk, called jameed, is poured on top of the lamb and rice to give it its distinct flavor and taste. The dish is also garnished with cooked pine nuts and almonds. The classic form of eating mansaf is using the right hand as a utensil. For politeness, participants in the feast tear pieces of meat to hand to the person next to them.

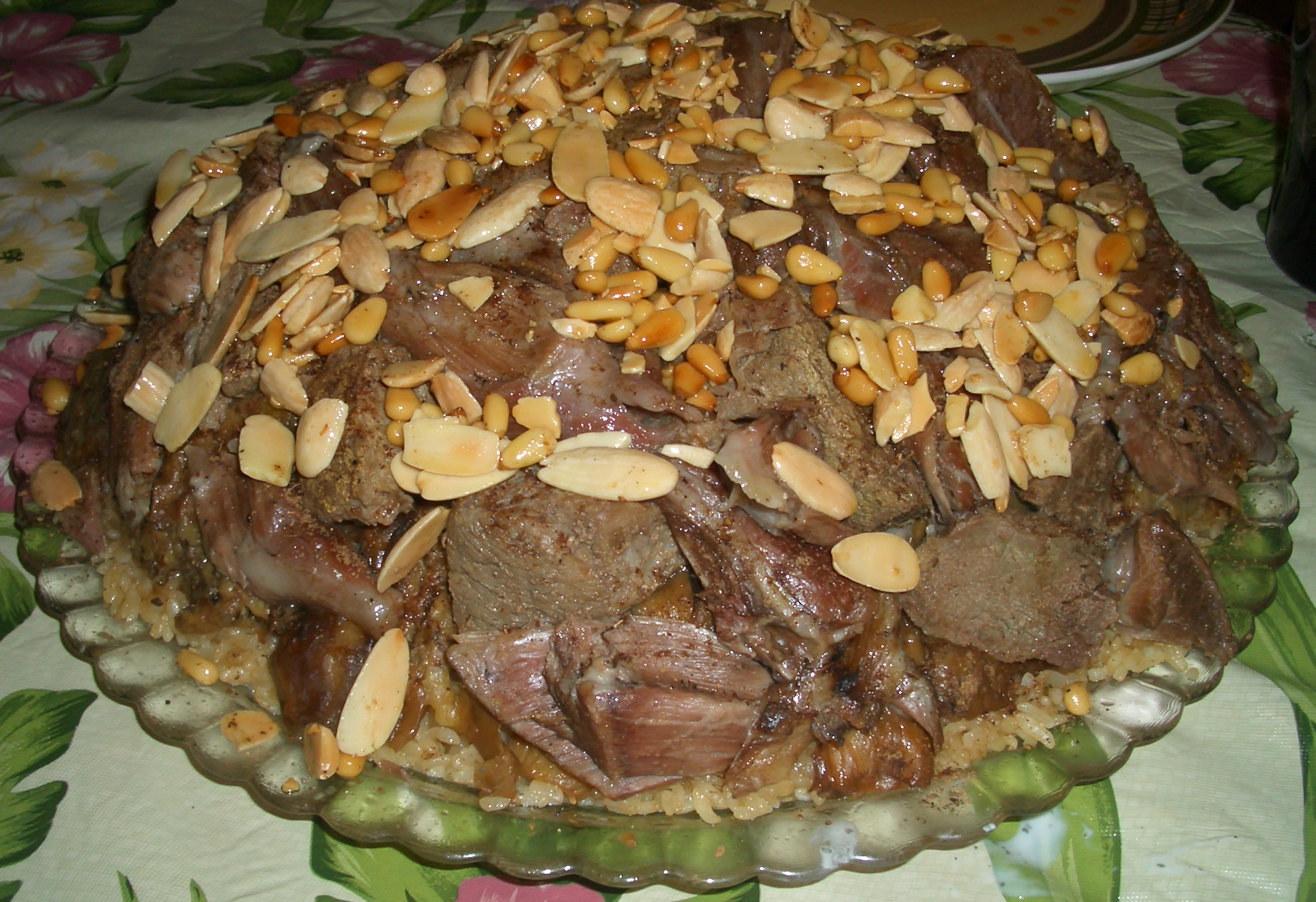
Maqluba with lamb

In addition to meals, the West Bank's many subregions have their own fruit-based jams. In the Hebron area, the primary crops are grapes. Families living in the area harvest the grapes in the spring and summer to produce a variety of products ranging from raisins, jams and a molasses known as dibs, or a fruit leather called malban, dibs and malban are often made from grapes that went unsold in the market. The Bethlehem area (Beit Jala and Jifna in particular), are known regionally for their apricots and apricot jam as is the Tulkarm area for its olives and olive oil.

=== Gaza ===
The cuisine of the Gaza Strip is influenced by both neighboring Egypt and its location on the Mediterranean coast. The staple food for the majority of the inhabitants in the area is fish. The Gaza Strip has a major fishing industry and fish is often served either grilled or fried after being stuffed with cilantro, garlic, red peppers and cumin and marinated in a mix of coriander, red peppers, cumin, and chopped lemons. Besides fish, as well as other types of seafood, Gazan cooking styles are affected by Egyptian culinary influences. This generally includes using hot peppers, garlic and chard to flavor many of their meals. Zibdieh is a clay pot dish that consists of shrimp baked in a stew of olive oil, garlic, hot peppers, and peeled tomatoes. Crabs are cooked and then stuffed with a red hot pepper paste called shatta.

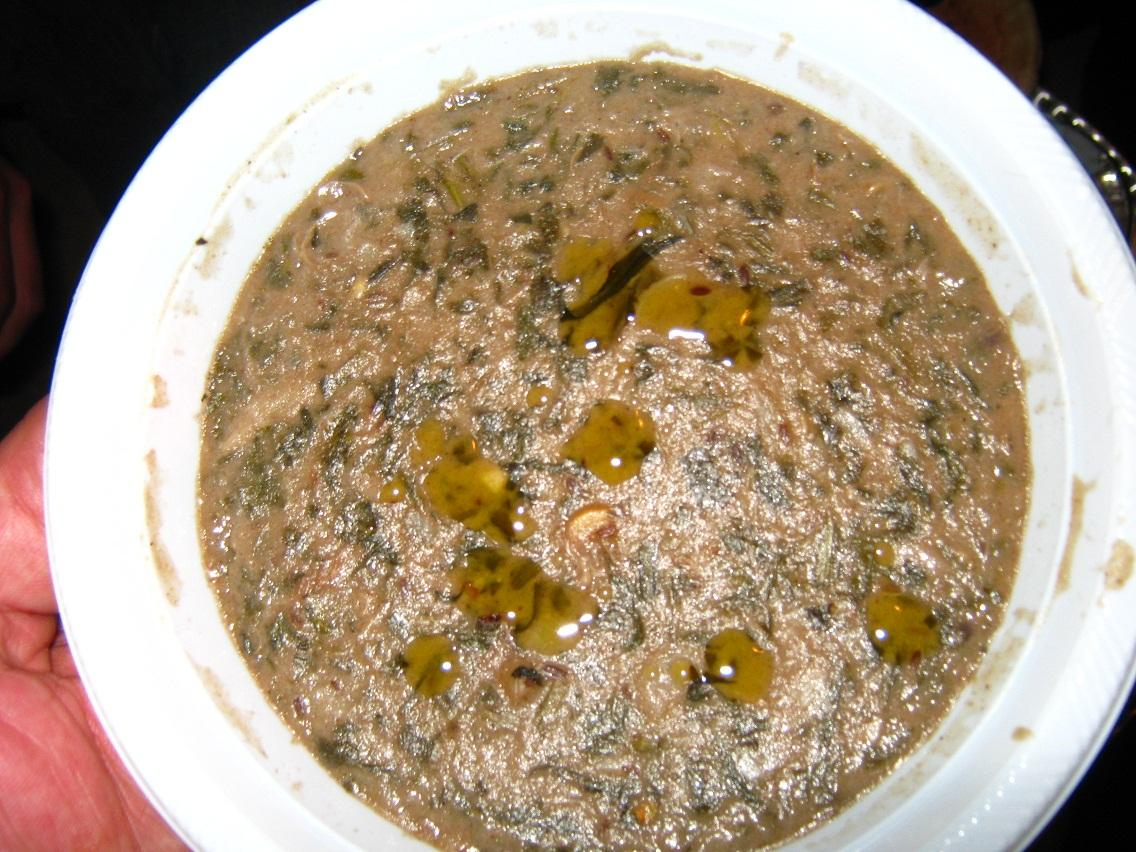
Sumaghiyyeh

Gaza was part of the Via Maris; a Roman trade route that transported spices and incense. The city's role in the spice trade contributed to the presence of spices in Gazan cuisine.

A dish native to the Gaza area is sumaghiyyeh. The meal consists of water-soaked ground sumac mixed with tahina. The mixture is added to sliced chard and pieces of stewed beef and garbanzo beans and then additionally flavored with dill seeds, garlic and hot peppers. It is often eaten cool with khubz. Rummaniyya depends on the particular time of the year and it is made up of unripened pomegranate seeds, eggplant, tahina, garlic, hot peppers and lentils. Fukharit adas is a slow-cooked lentil stew flavored with red pepper flakes, crushed dill seeds, garlic, and cumin, traditionally made during winter and early spring.

Palestinians in Gaza rely on several clay utensils in their cooking, including the zibdiyyeh (زبدية), a clay vessel used as a serving bowl, mortar and pestle, and cooking vessel, as well as clay water pitchers (ibriq) and clay cooking jars known as qidra.

Qidra is a rice dish named after the large clay vessel and clay oven that is used to bake it. In the oven, the rice is cooked with pieces of meat, often lamb, whole garlic cloves, garbanzo beans, cardamom pods, and various other spices such as turmeric—which gives it a yellow color—cinnamon, allspice, nutmeg and cumin. Plain rice cooked in meat or chicken broth and flavored with mild spices including cinnamon is known as fatteh ghazzawiyyeh. The rice is layered over a thin markook bread known as farasheeh, smothered in ghee (an Egyptian variation of butter) and topped with stuffed chicken or lamb. The meal is eaten with green peppers and lemon sauce.

Palestinian author Laila el-Haddad writes that the exact history of the popularity of chilis in Gaza (especially Gaza City) is a mystery, she attributes their modern importance in Gazan cuisine to their nutritional value, affordability, and ease of cultivation.

== Practices ==
=== Food preservation ===
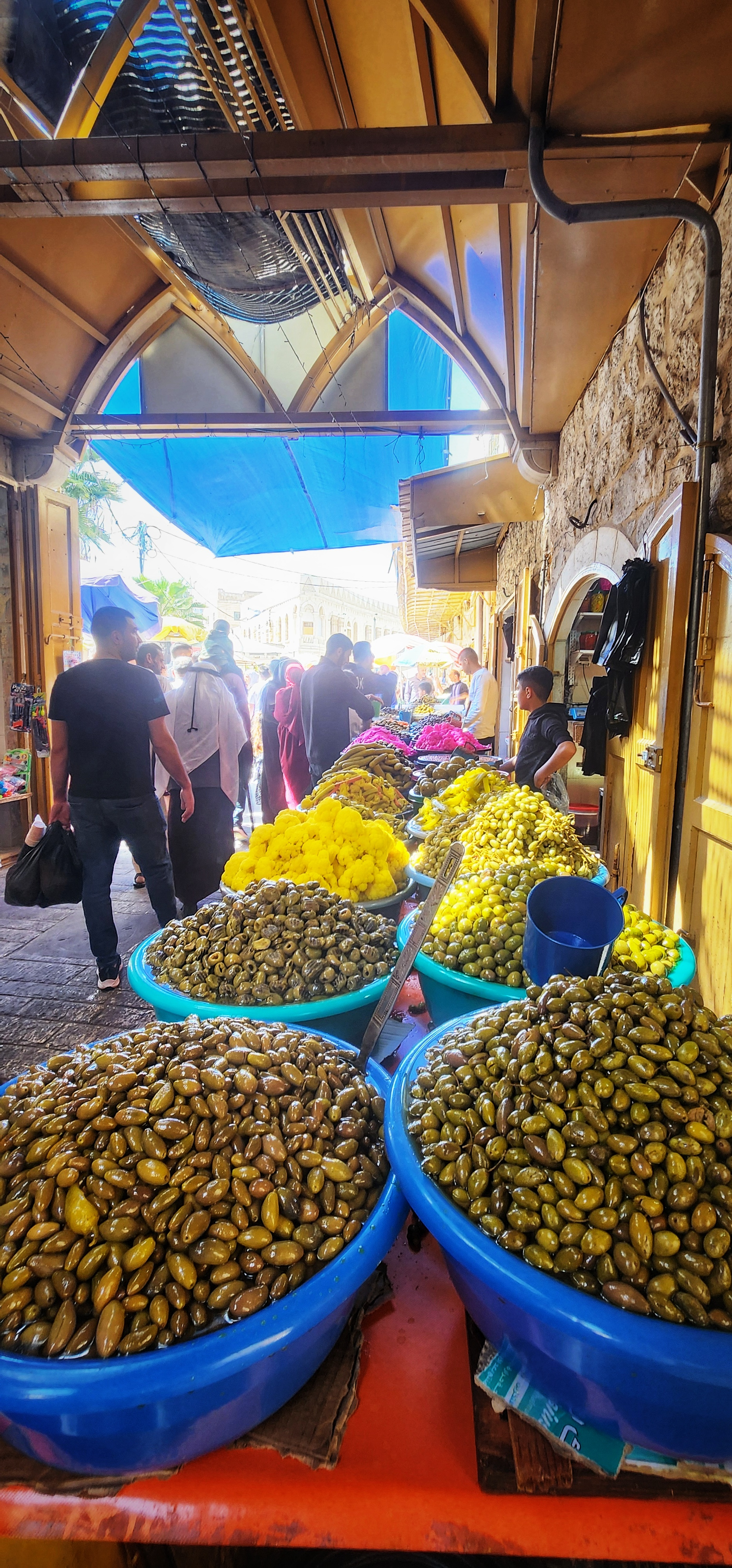
Vendor in Hebron, selling pickled vegetables

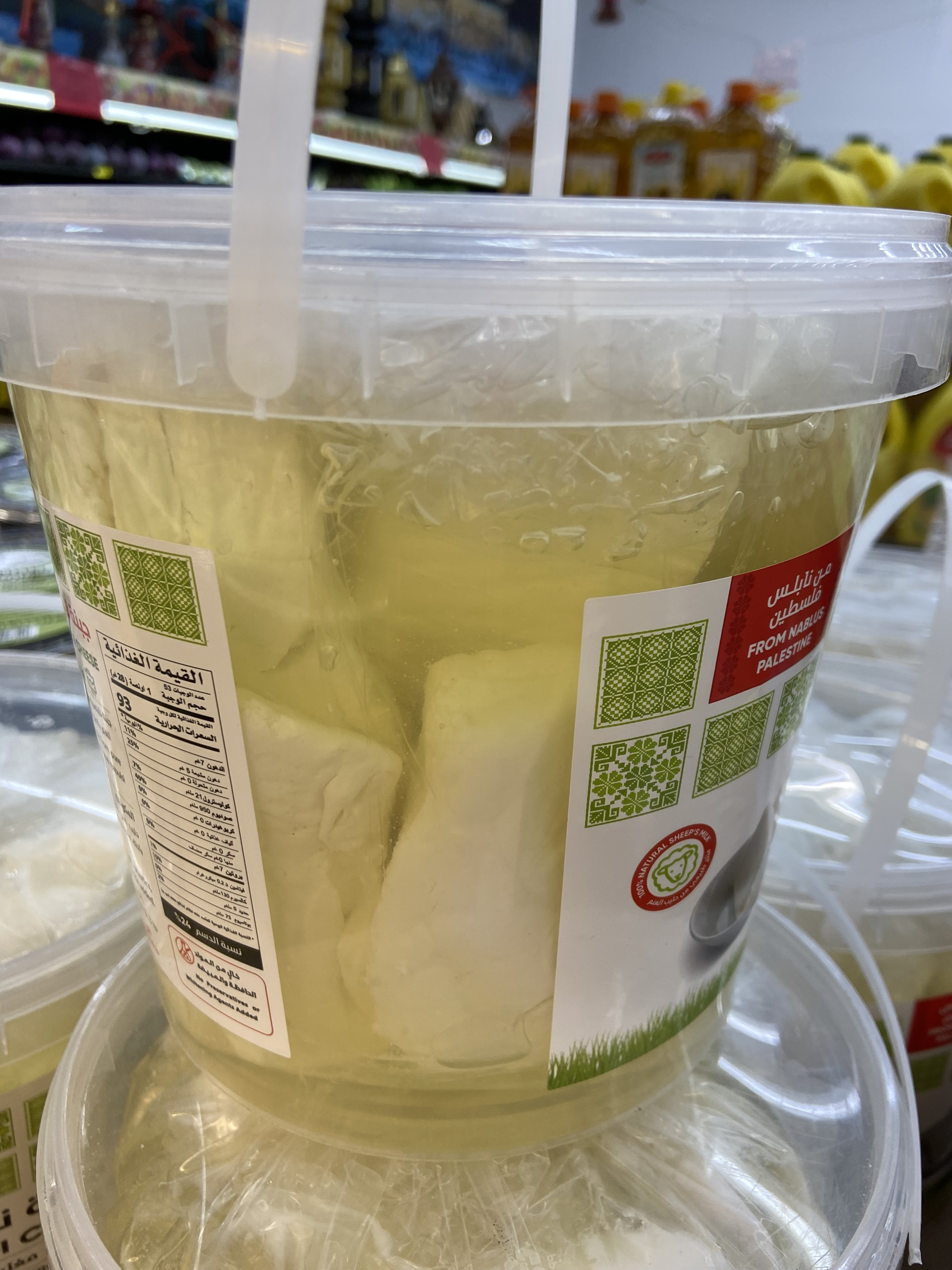
Nabulsi cheese, sold at room temperature, and preserved in brine.

Mooneh (or mouneh, Arabic: مونة, lit. 'pantry') denotes both food preservation for year-round use and the pantry itself. Palestinians, like the rest of the Levant, do this mainly through pickling, drying, and candying. Fruits are turned into jams; vegetables are pickled; yogurt is dried and made into jameed or strained and rolled into labaneh then stored in olive-oil; butter is preserved by clarifying it, turning it into samneh, as well as other preserves like shatta and makdous. Traditionally, mooneh was practiced in large gatherings of women from the same community, who produced and shared large batches of food, often as a social ritual, while tasks like animal slaughter were deferred to men.

Jameed's method of preservation was introduced via the traditions of the nomadic Bedouins. The warm climate of Palestine accelerates food spoilage, making preservation economically important. Food preservation became less important as refrigeration was introduced in the 1960s.

In 1946, the Survey of Palestine reported that Arabs in Palestine converted surplus milk produced in the spring and summer into hard white cheese preserved in brine for consumption during off-season months, whereas Jewish communities mainly consumed fresh milk, with only relatively small surpluses converted into other dairy products.

=== Foraging ===
The tradition of foraging wild plants for medicinal and culinary use remains common among Palestinians. Commonly foraged wild plants in Palestine include Khubbaizeh (malva), Akkoub (gundelia), Mariamieh (Salvia fruticosa), baqleh, (Portulaca oleracea), among others. These plants are made into stuffed leaves, soups, pies, or simply fried in olive oil. During periods of siege and food scarcity, particularly in Gaza, foraged malva has re-emerged as a staple survival food.

Palestinian Christians in areas like Aboud forage for edible wild landsnails during winter whereas Palestinian Muslims are forbidden from eating them by Islamic dietary law.

== Types of meals ==
=== Bread meals ===
See also List of Palestinian breads

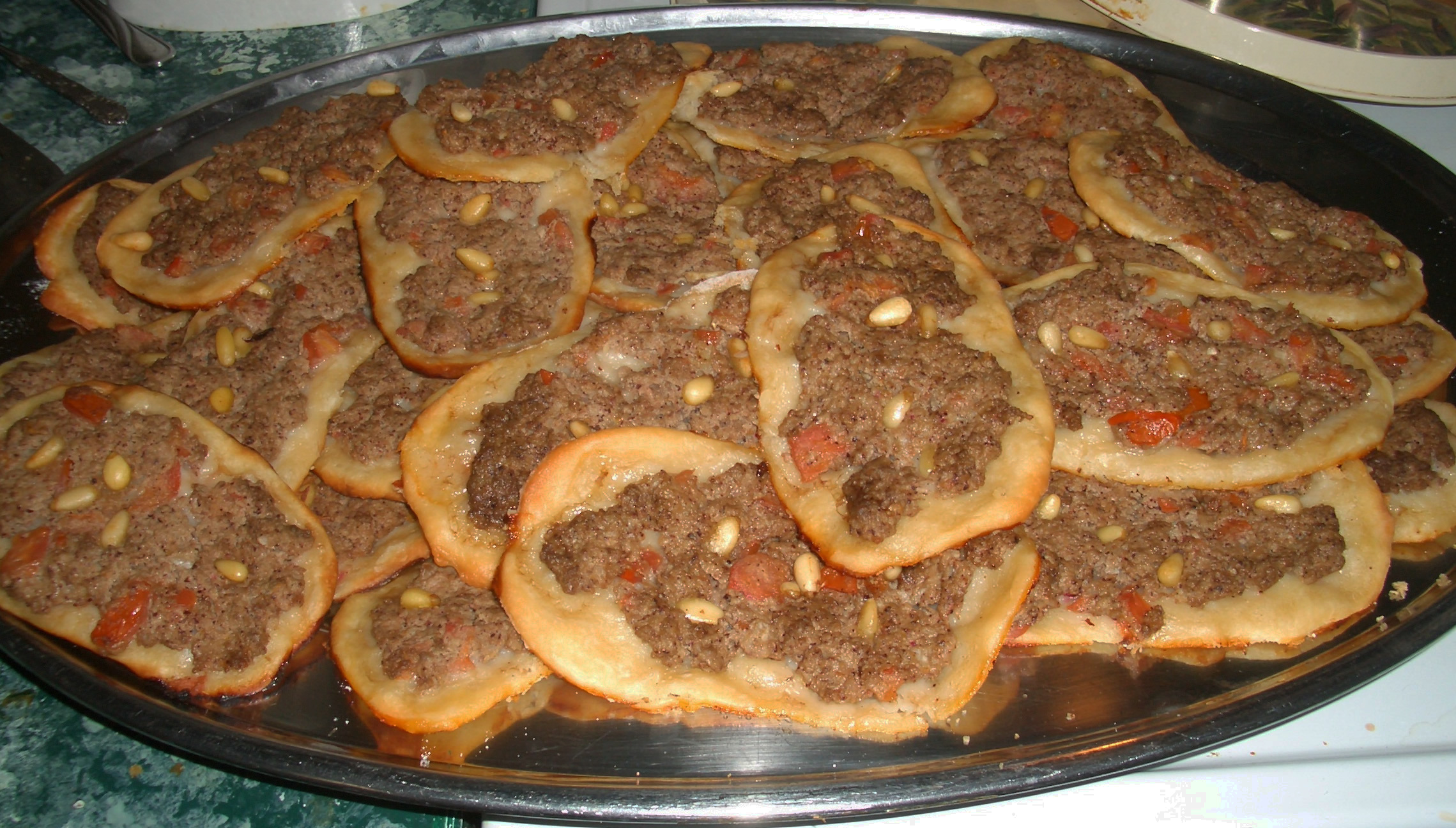
Sfiha

Palestinians bake a variety of breads: they include khubz, pita and markook and taboon. Khubz is an everyday bread and is very similar to pita. It often takes the place of utensils; It is torn into bite-size pieces and used to scoop various dips such as hummus or ful. Markook bread is a paper-thin unleavened bread and when unfolded it is almost transparent. Taboon receives its name from the ovens used to bake them.

There are several types of sandwich and pizza-like foods eaten by the Palestinians, including manaeesh, sfiha, fatayer and shawarma. Manaeesh is a baked flat bread, usually topped with za'atar and olive oil. simboseh and fatayer are baked or sometimes fried doughs stuffed with minced meat and cooked onions or snobar (pine nuts). Fatayer is usually folded into triangles and unlike simboseh, it could be filled with spinach or za'atar.

Sfiha is a baked miniature flatbread, topped with lamb and cooked red peppers or tomatoes. Shawarma is mostly served in a long folded roll of khubz wrapped around shaved lamb or chicken accompanied by pickled turnips and cucumbers, tomatoes, onions and tahina. Shawarma could also be served as lamb slices on a plate with tahina as a side dish. Falafel are fried peppered fava beans or sometimes hummus, parsley and onions fried together into small patties. They are usually served and eaten wrapped in khubz.

=== Mahashi ===
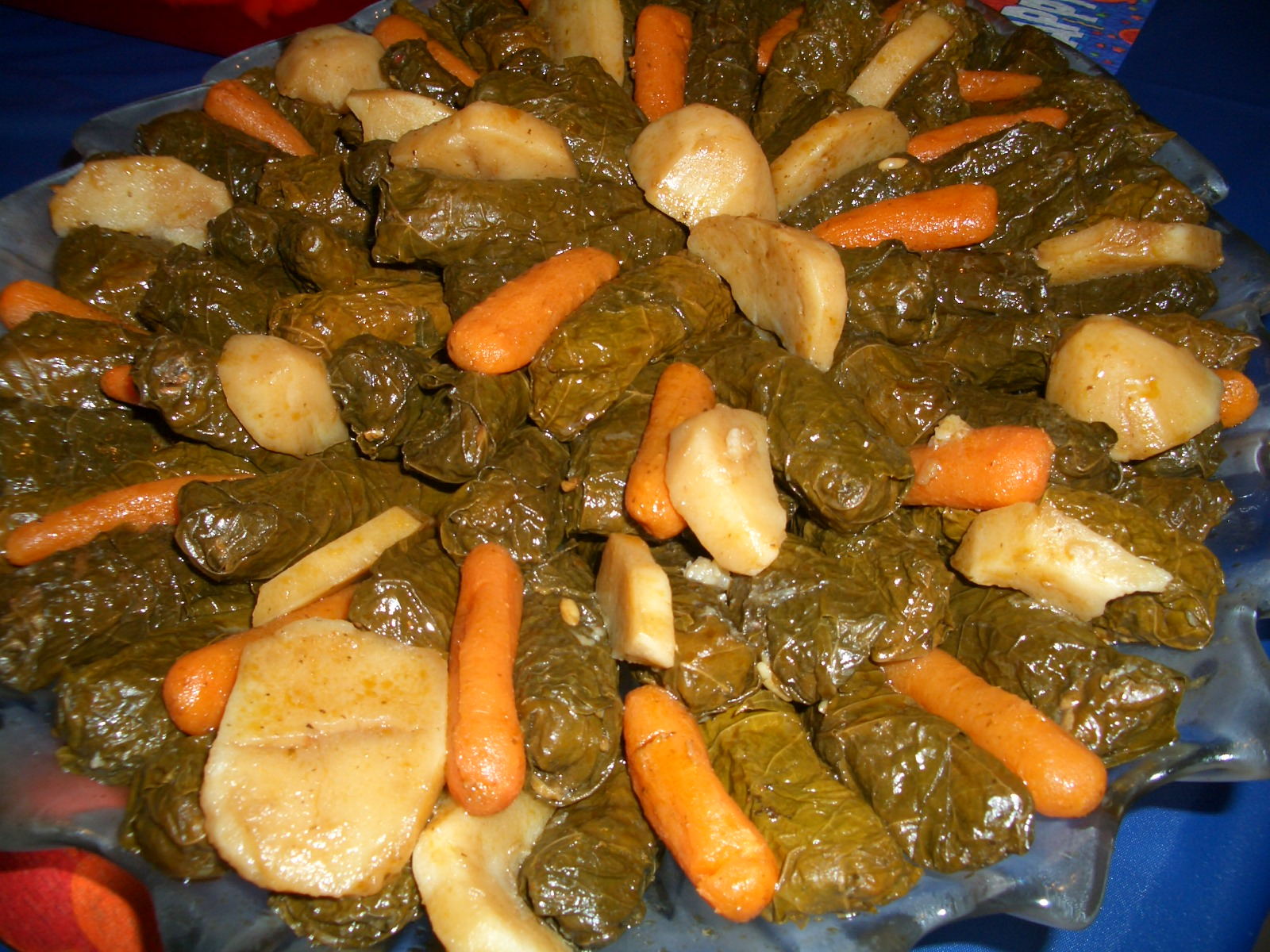
A family-sized serving of waraq al-'ainib

Mahashi dishes are composed of stuffed vegetables such as eggplants, baby pumpkins, potatoes, carrots and marrows as well as a variety of leaf vegetables, primarily grape leaves, cabbage leaves and less often chard. Mahashi requires delicacy and time—the main reason it is prepared before the day it is cooked and served. Many female family members participate in the rolling and stuffing of the vegetables, relaxing the amount of individual effort required, and also serving as a social occasion. Mahashi can also refer to stuffed meat, using whole animals or specific cuts.

Waraq al-'ainib (grape leaves; known as dolma in Western and Balkan countries), is a mahashi meal reserved for large gatherings. It is grape leaves normally wrapped around minced meat, white rice and diced tomatoes; however, meat is not always used. It is then cooked and served as dozens of rolls on a large plate usually accompanied by boiled potato slices, carrots and lamb pieces. Kousa mahshi are zucchinis stuffed with the same ingredients as waraq al-'ainib and usually served alongside it with heavy meals. If made with a large number of zucchinis it is known as waraq al-'ainib wa kousa.

=== Dips and side dishes ===
See also List of Palestinian dips and List of Palestinian cheeses

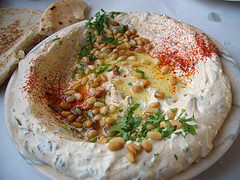
A plate of hummus, garnished with paprika and olive oil and pine nuts

Bread dips and side dishes such as hummus, baba ghanoush, mutabbel, and labeneh are frequently served during breakfast and dinner. Hummus, the Arabic word for garbanzo beans, is commonly made as hummus bi tahini. Palestinians soak the garbanzo beans with water overnight, then boil them in a pot for at least an hour. The resulting ground beans are mixed with tahini (sesame paste) and sometimes lemon juice. It is often lathered in olive oil and sometimes sprinkled with paprika, oregano and pine nuts—the latter is especially used in the West Bank. The town of Abu Ghosh, west of Jerusalem, is a popular hummus destination for Israelis and tourists. Hummus could also be mixed, boiled or cooked with ful (fava beans) and results in a completely different dish called mukhluta that has a distinct flavor and brownish color.

Baba ghanoush is an eggplant or aubergine salad or dip with several variants. The root of all the variants is broiled and mashed eggplant and tahini lathered with olive oil, which can then be flavored with garlic, onions, peppers, ground cumin seeds, mint and parsley. Mutabbel is one of the spicier variants that receives its zest from green chili peppers.

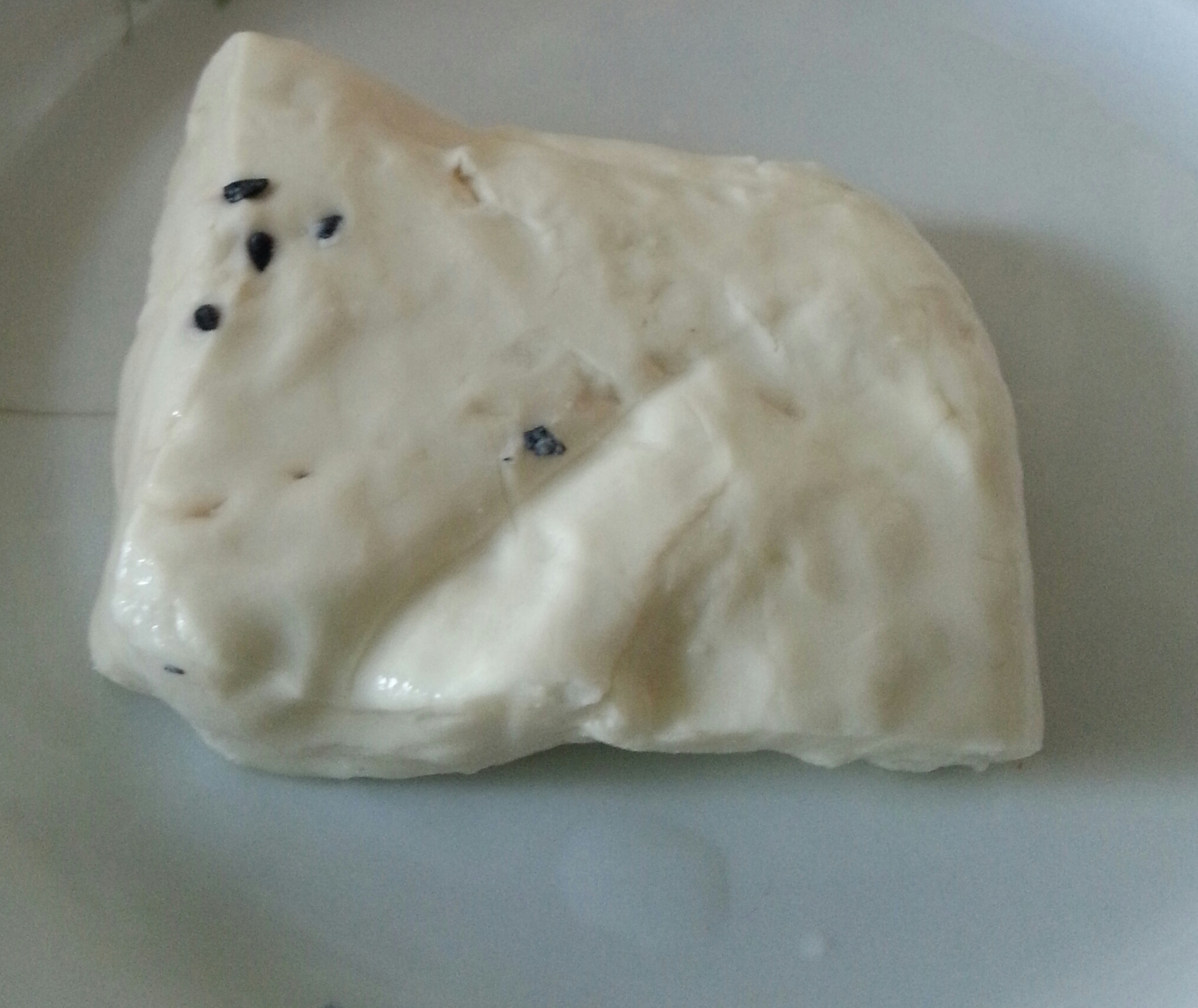
Nabulsi cheese

Jibneh Arabieh or jibneh baida is a white table cheese served with any of the above dishes. Ackawi cheese is a common variation of jibneh baida. Ackawi cheese has a smoother texture and a mild salty taste. It originated in the city of Akka (Acre)—hence the name Ackawi—in the Galilee. Labaneh is a pasty yogurt-like cream cheese either served on a plate with olive oil and za'atar—which is generally called labeneh wa za'atar—or in a khubz sandwich.

=== Salads ===
See also List of Palestinian salads

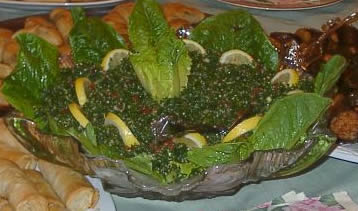
Tabbouleh with lettuce and wedges of lemon

A Mediterranean-style table salad made in the Levant is tabbouleh. The salad is made from parsley pieces, bulgur, diced tomatoes, cucumbers and is sautéed with lemon juice and vinegar. In 2006, the largest bowl of tabbouleh in the world was prepared by Palestinian cooks in the West Bank city of Ramallah. Fattoush is a combination of khubz pieces and parsley with chopped cucumbers, radishes, tomatoes and scallions and flavored by sumac. Dagga or Dagga Gazawiya is a Gazan salad usually made in a clay bowl and is a mix of crushed tomatoes, garlic cloves, red hot peppers, chopped dill and olive oil. Its seasoned with lemon juice immediately before being served.

=== Sweets ===
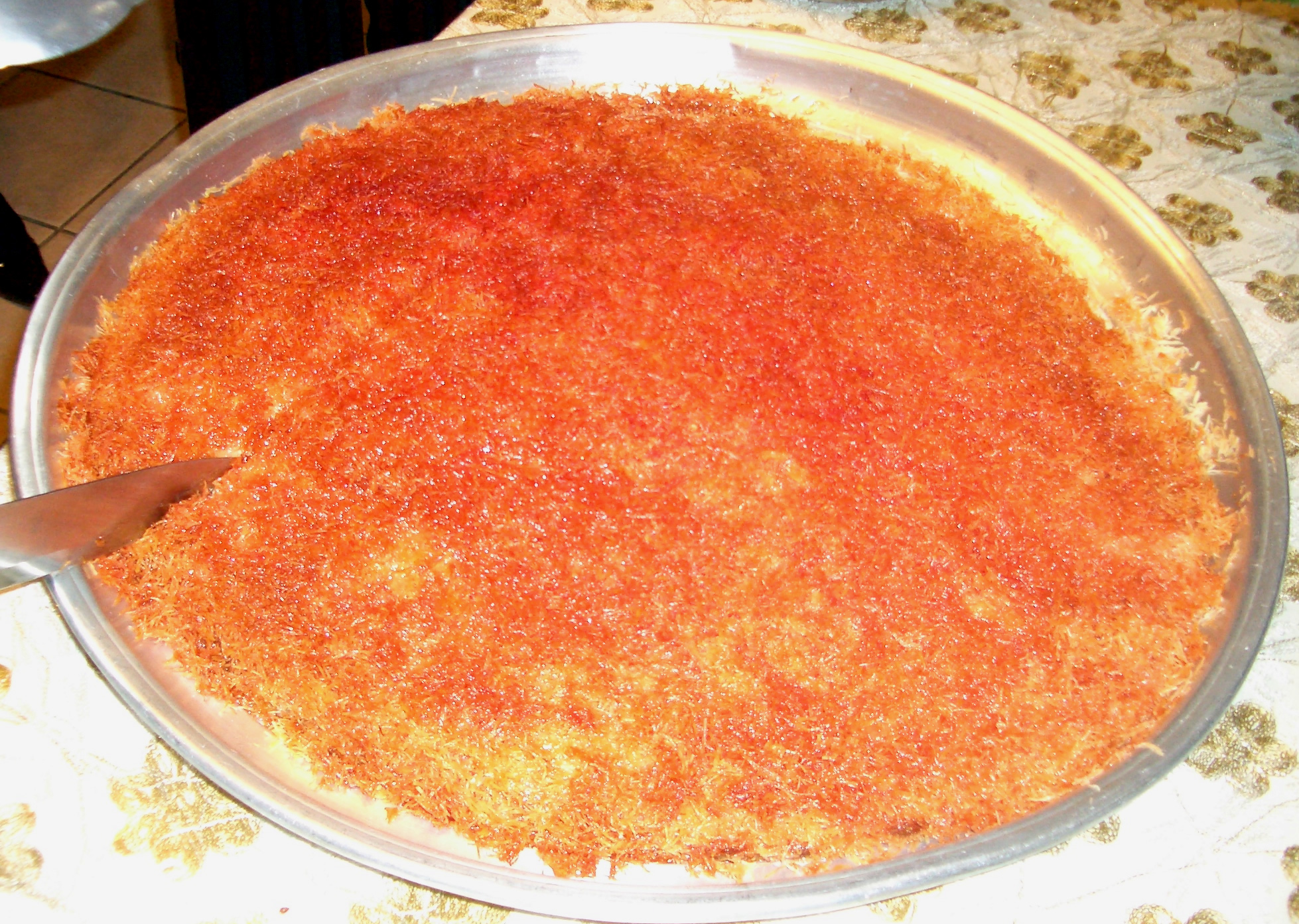
Kanafeh

Palestinian desserts include baklawa, halawa and kanafeh, as well as other semolina and wheat pastries. Baklawa is a pastry made of thin sheets of unleavened flour dough, filled with pistachios and walnuts sweetened by honey. Halawa is a block confection of sweetened sesame flour served in sliced pieces. Muhalabiyeh is a rice pudding made with milk and topped with pistachios or almonds.

Kanafeh, a well-known dessert in the Arab World and Turkey, originated in the city of Nablus in the northern West Bank. It is made of several fine shreds of pastry noodles with honey-sweetened cheese in the center. The top layer of the pastry is usually dyed orange with food coloring and sprinkled with crushed pistachios. Nablus is famed for its kanafeh, partly due to its use of a white-brined cheese called Nabulsi after the city. Boiled sugar is used as a syrup for kanafeh.

=== Snack foods ===
It is common for Palestinian hosts to serve fresh and dried fruits, nuts, seeds, and dates to their guests. Roasted and salted watermelon, squash and sunflower seeds, as well as pistachios and cashews, are common legumes. Watermelon seeds, known as bizir al-bateekh, are eaten regularly during various leisurely activities: playing cards, smoking nargila, conversing with friends or before and after meals.

== Meal structure ==
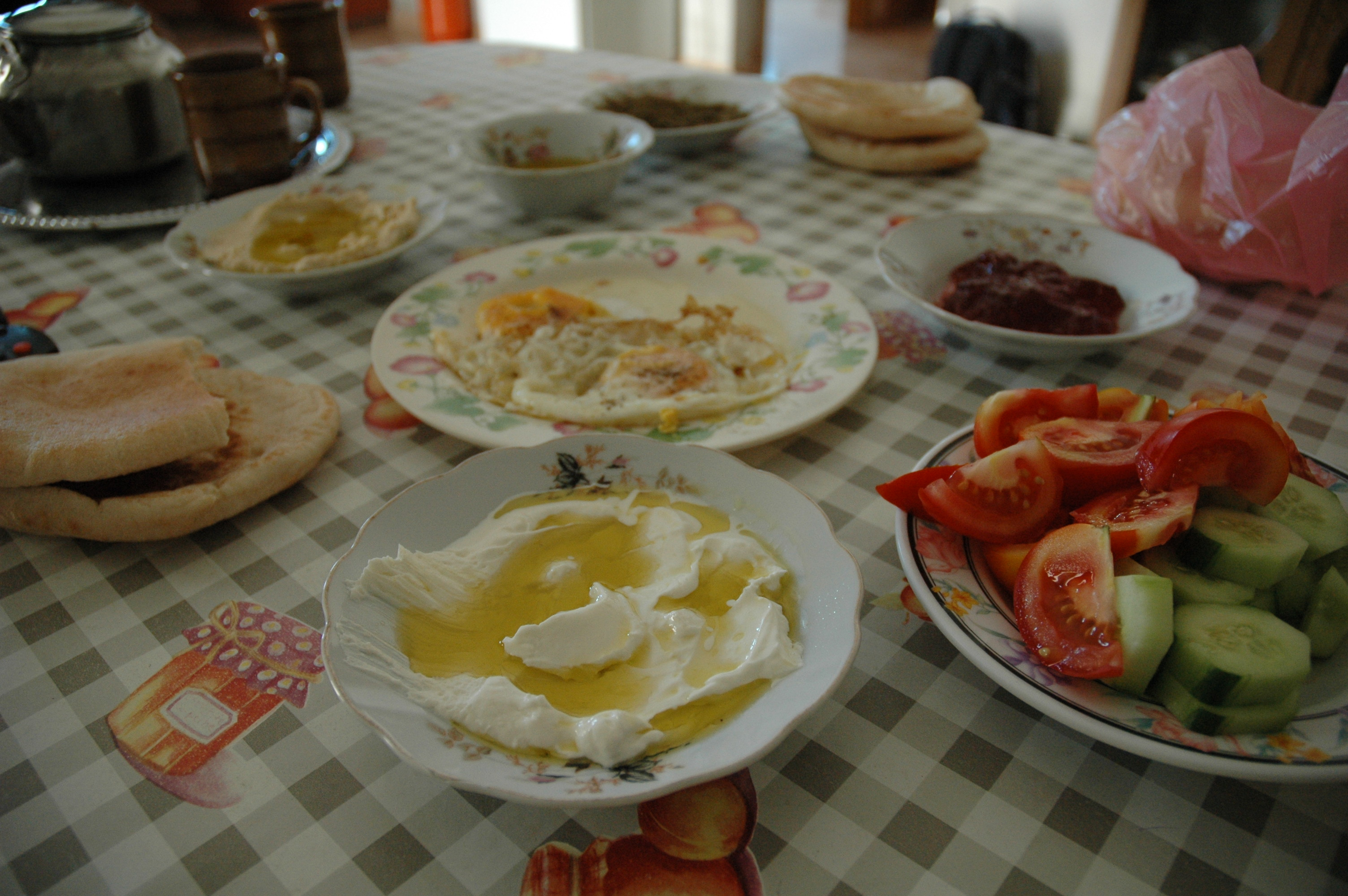
A traditional Palestinian breakfast

Palestinian culture and life revolves around food in every aspect, whether it is an ordinary day or a special occasion such as a wedding or holiday. Meals are structured in a cyclical order by Palestinians and span into two main courses and several intermediate ones like coffee, fruits and sweets as well as dinner. Like in most Arab cultures, meals are a time to spend with family and could last 1–2 hours depending on the specific time of the day. Unlike other cultures, lunch is the primary course and breakfast and dinner are lighter in contents.

- Iftur (lit. 'break-fast') is a term for breakfast, usually consists of fried eggs, olives, labaneh, olive oil or jams. Hummus bi-tahini is also eaten primarily during this time the day.
- Gheda is a term for lunch, usually late in the afternoon. Lunch is the heaviest meal of the day and main ingredients could include rice, lamb, chicken, cooked vegetables and forms of mahashi.
- Asrooneh Derives from the word 'Aasr (lit. 'afternoon') is a term for the consumption of a variety of fruits and legumes after gheda.
- 'Asha is a term for dinner, usually eaten anytime from 8–10 pm. 'Asha is simpler than gheda and some foods consumed include fatayer, hummus bi-tahini, a variety of salads and a Levantine-style omelette called ijee.
- 'Hilew Sometimes after or just before 'asha as well as when hosting guests come various sweets. Baklawa is common and is usually purchased from pastry shops instead of made at home like muhallabiyeh.
- Shay wa Kahwe Tea and coffee are served in throughout the day in before, after and between iftur, gheda and 'asha.

== Dining out ==
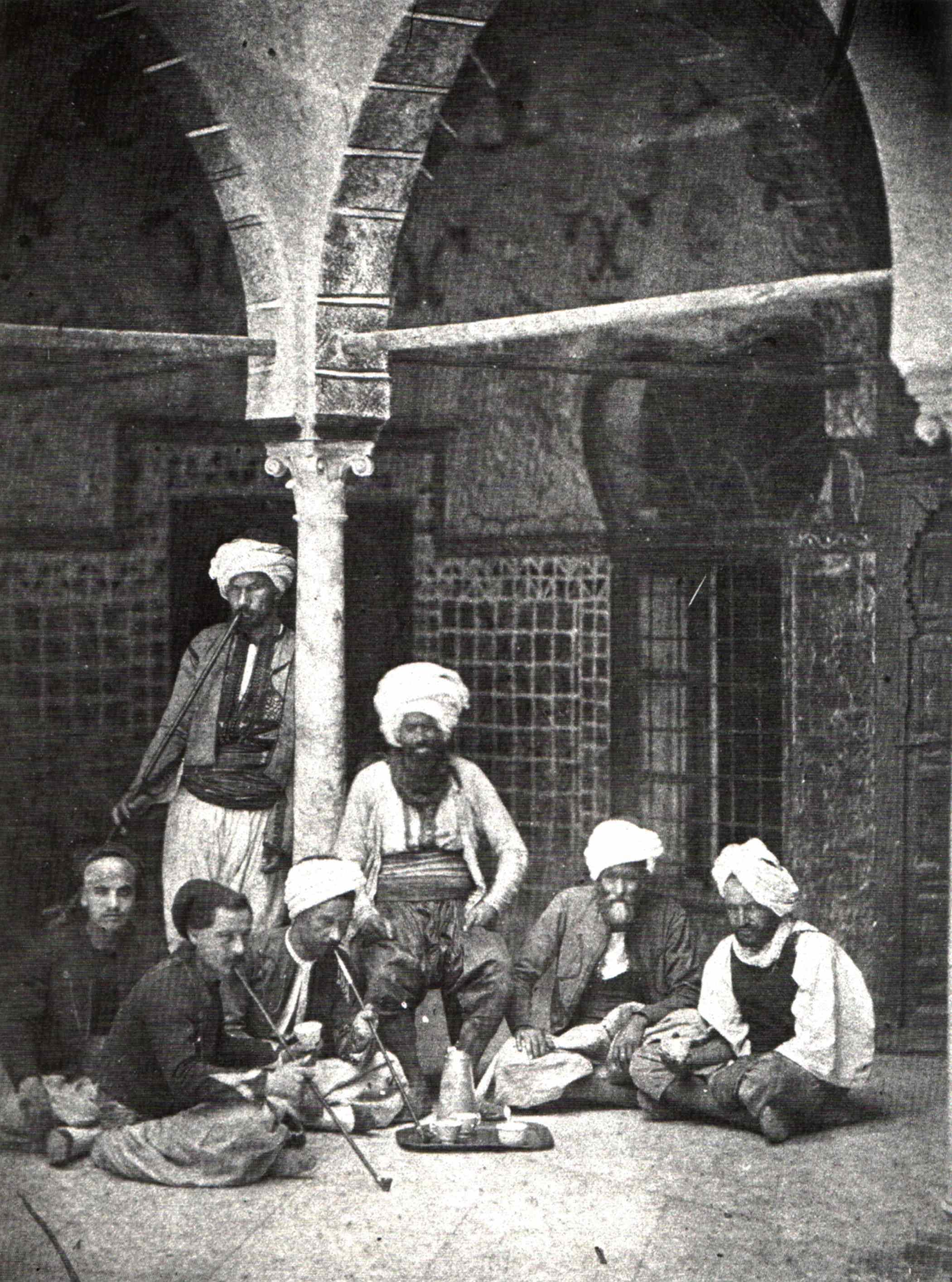
A maqhah in Ottoman Jerusalem, 1858

- Mata'im — Offer a brilliant array of cold appetizers known as the mezze. Notably, hummus bi-tahini, mukhluta, sometimes nearly a dozen variations of aubergine salad, tabbouleh, fattoush, chili pepper and red cabbage salads and dishes made up by the chef are served. Kibbee balls and sfiha are the primary hot appetizers available. Heavy meals are rarely provided by restaurants, instead however, the entrées include shish kebab, shish taouk, rack of lamb and chicken breasts.
- al-Maqhah — Serve hot beverages and soft drinks and are usually restricted to male customers—who take part in leisurely activities like playing cards or backgammon and smoking nargileh.
- Mahal 'hilewayet — Found in the souks of cities and major towns, they offer a wide range of sweets common with Palestinians, such as, kanafeh, baklawa and anise-flavored cookies. Family-run shops often serve at least one type of sweet that they themselves created.
- Mahal falafel — Sandwich shops that offer mainly falafel and shawarma with several different contents.

== Beverages ==
See also List of Palestinian beverages

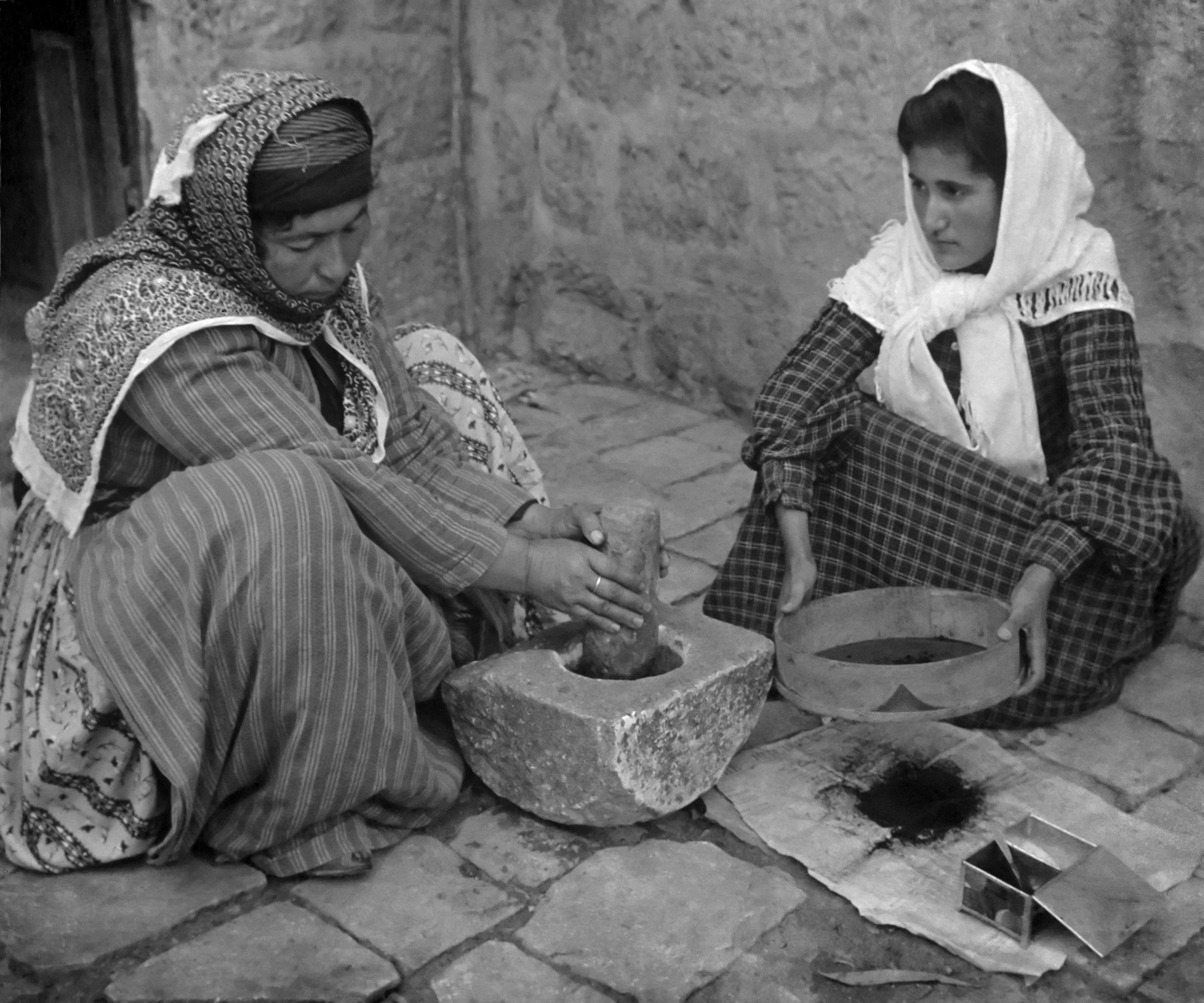
Palestinian women grinding coffee, 1905

There are two hot beverages that Palestinians consume: Coffee is served in the morning and throughout the day, while tea is sipped in the evening. Tea is usually flavored with na'ana (mint) or maramiyyeh (sage). The coffee of choice is usually Turkish or Arabic coffee. Arabic coffee is unsweetened but spiced with cardamom. Homemade fruit juices are also a common household drink during warm days and during Ramadan, the holy month for fasting by Muslims. A warm drink made from sweetened milk with salep garnished with walnuts, coconut flakes and cinnamon, is known as sahlab and is primarily served during the winter season.

A widely consumed liquor by Palestinian Christians, Samaritans, and many less-stringently observant Muslims is Arak. Arak is a clear anise flavored alcoholic drink that is mixed with water to soften it and give it a creamy white color. It is consumed during special occasions such as holidays, weddings, and gatherings or with the mezze. Beer is also a consumed drink and the Palestinian town of Taybeh in the central West Bank contains the only beer brewery in the Palestinian territories. In addition to regular beer, the brewery produces non-alcoholic beer for conservative Muslims. Soft drinks are also common in Palestinian homes and the city of Ramallah contains a Coca-Cola bottling plant, while Gaza, Hebron and Nablus have distribution centers.

== Holiday cuisine ==
There is a sharp difference of Palestinian courses eaten on a daily basis in comparison to those reserved for holidays—which include family and religious occasions for both Muslims and Christians.

=== Olive harvest ===
Certain olive oil–based dishes are seasonal and are traditionally served to celebrate the olive harvest, like musakhan, maltoot bread, musaffan (مسَفَّن) bread, and qalayet bandora.

=== Ramadan ===
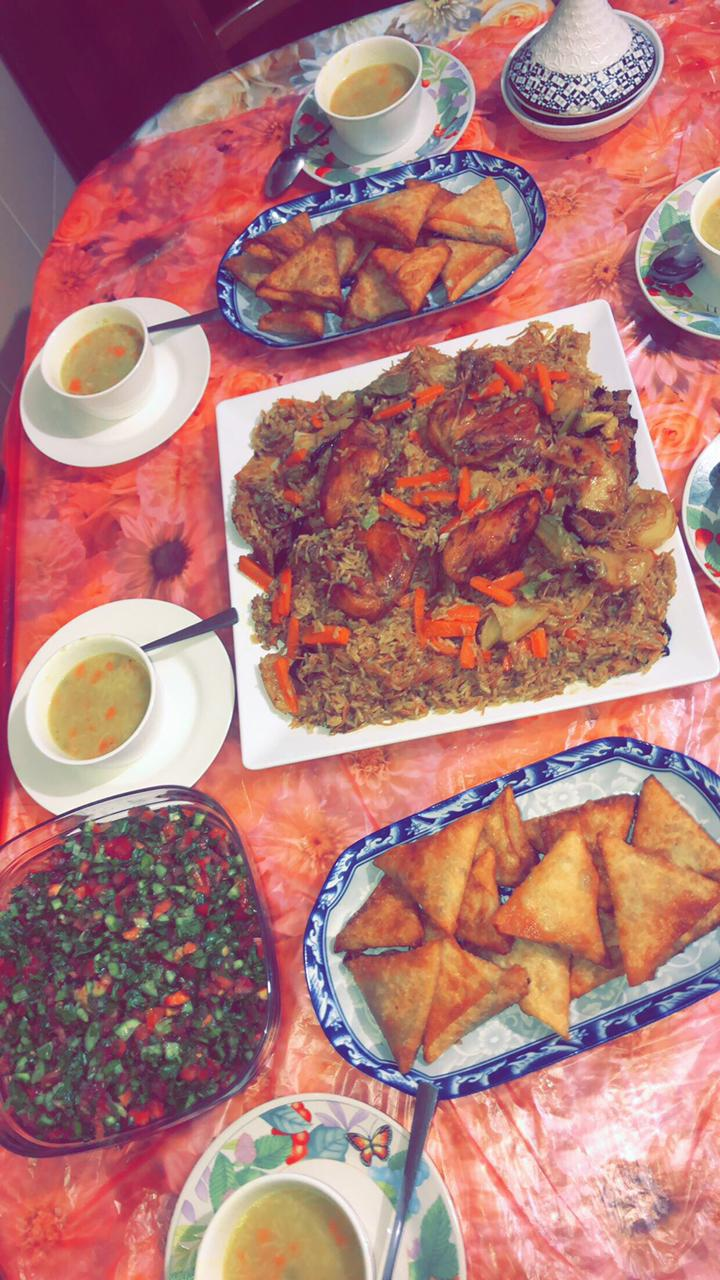
A Palestinian Iftar table, with freekeh soup, maqluba, and samosas

In the past, during the fasting month of Ramadan, the Musaher of a town would yell and beat his drum to wake up the town's residents for suhoor (lit. 'of dawn')—usually very early in the morning, ranging from 4–6 am. The meals eaten during this time are light and foods include labeneh, cheese, bread and fried or boiled eggs along with various liquids to drink. The muezzin's call to dawn prayers signaled the beginning of sawm or fasting.

Breaking the day's fasting traditionally begins with the brief consumption of dates and a chilled beverage. Palestinians make a variety of fruit-based beverages, including the flavors, tamar hindi or tamarind, sous or licorice, kharroub or carob and Qamar Eddine. Tamar hindi is made by soaking tamarinds in water for a many hours, then straining, sweetening and mixing it with rose water and lemon juice. Kharroub is made similarly except instead of tamarind, carob is used. Qamar Eddine is made of dried apricots boiled into a liquid and chilled.

The term iftar has a different meaning in Ramadan where it is used to describe the 'breaking of fasting' unlike its common meaning of breakfast in the morning. Iftar begins with soup, either made from lentils, vegetables or freekeh. Freekeh soup is made from cracked, green wheat cooked in chicken broth. There is a wide variety of meals served during iftar, ranging from small plates or bowls vegetable-based courses or saniyyehs (large plates or trays) of a particular meat. Common small dishes on the dinner table are bamia—a name for okra in tomato paste, mloukhiyeh—a corchorus stew—or maqali, an array of fried tomatoes, aubergines, potatoes, peppers and zucchini. Pilaf or plain freekeh are normally served alongside the dinner meat. Each household prepares extra food to provide for their neighbors and the less fortunate—who must receive an equal version of the food eaten at home. Foods like maftoul, kibbeh and sambousek are most common during Ramadan.

=== Holiday sweets ===
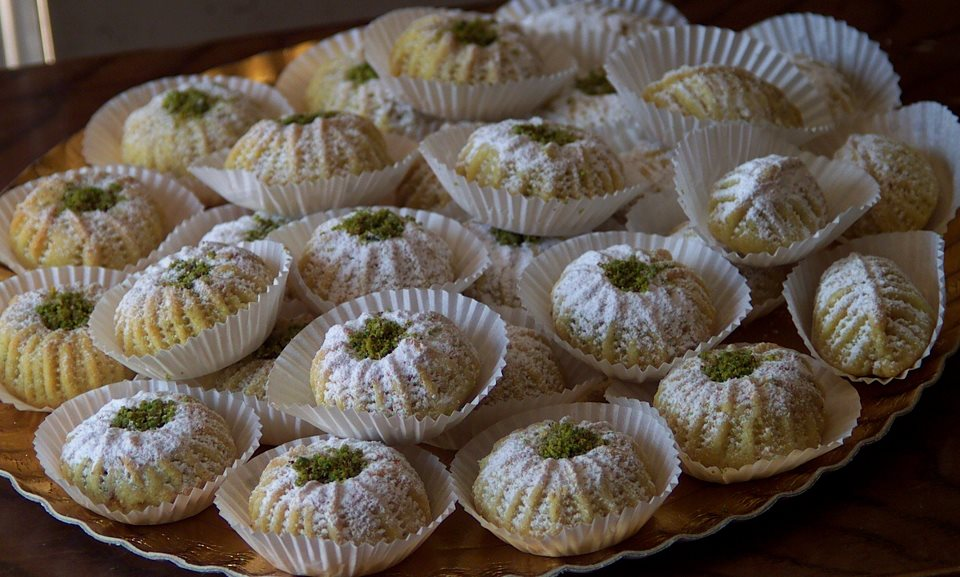
Palestinian style ka'ak with ma'amoul

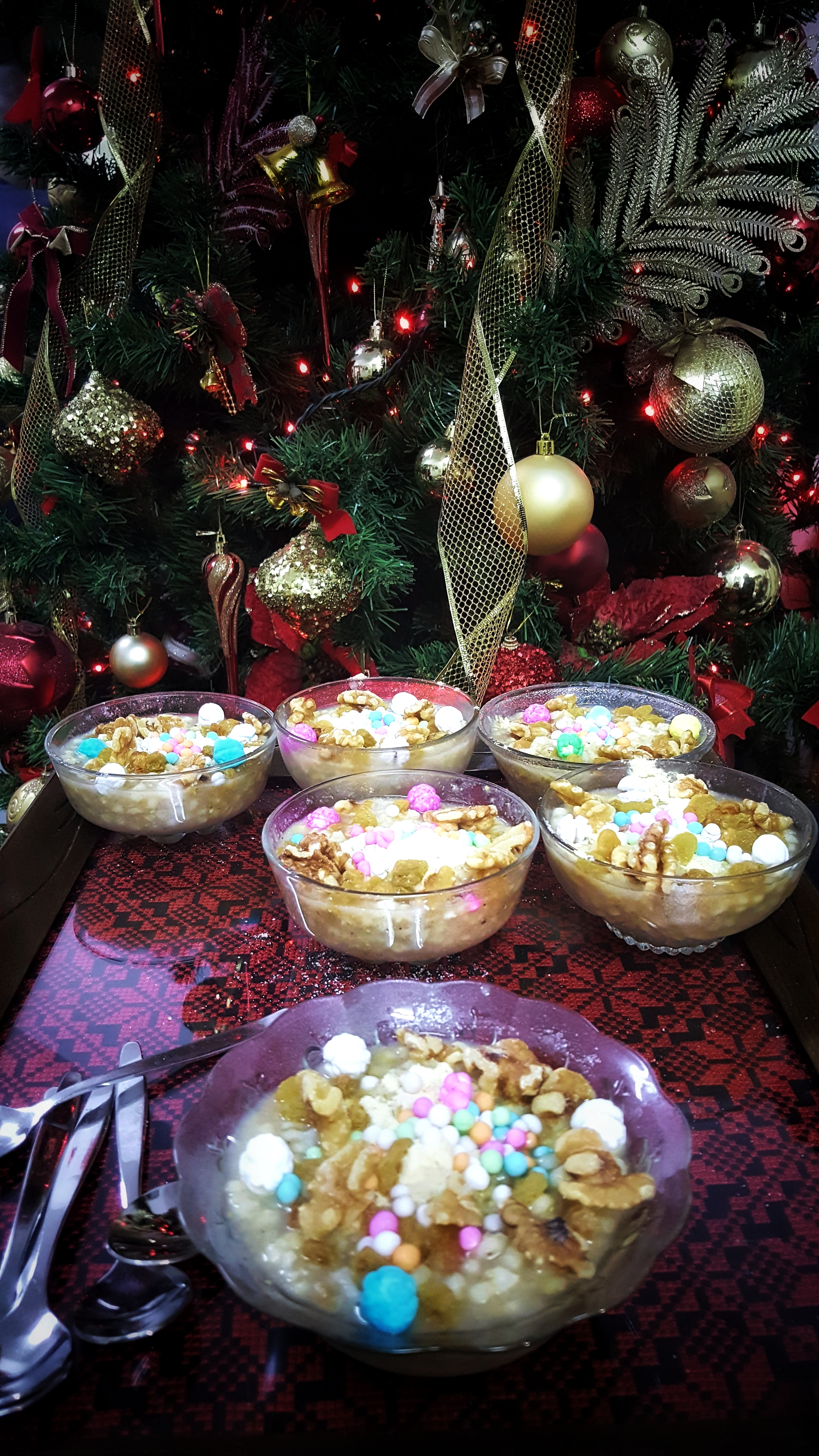
Burbara wheat decorated porridge

A common Palestinian dessert reserved only for Ramadan is qatayef, which could be provided by the numerous street vendors in several major Palestinian cities or towns as well as typical Palestinian households. Qatayef is the general name of the dessert as a whole, but more specifically, the name of the batter that acts as a base. The result of the batter being poured into a round hot plate appears similar to pancakes, except only one side is cooked, then folded. The pastry is filled with either unsalted goat cheese or ground walnuts and cinnamon. It is then baked and served with a hot sugar-water syrup or sometimes honey.

Ka'ak bi 'awja (ma'amoul) is a semolina shortbread pastry filled with ground dates called 'ajwa or walnuts. The dessert is a traditional meal for Christians during Easter, however, ka'ak bi awja is also prepared towards the end of Ramadan, to be eaten during Eid al-Fitr—a Muslim festival immediately following Ramadan, as well as during Eid al-Adha, as well as Samaritans during Sukkot. During Mawlid—the holiday honoring the birth of the Islamic prophet Muhammad—zalabiyeh which consists of small, crunchy deep fried dough balls in dipped in syrup, is served. The dough is made from flour, yeast and water.

A special pudding called mughli is prepared for a new born child. The dessert is made of ground rice, sugar and a mixture of spices, garnished with almonds, pine nuts and walnuts. An infant's new tooth is celebrated with bowls of sweetened wheat or barley and sweets served after a child's circumcision include baklava and Burma. Christian families in mourning serve a sweet bun known as rahmeh. It is a food eaten in remembrance of the dead and as a gesture of blessing the soul of the deceased person. The Greek Orthodox Church offers a special tray with cooked wheat covered with sugar and candy after a memorial service. Christians who observe Eid il-Burbara celebrate by preparing a sweet wheat porridge flavored with spices and decorated with nuts called Burbara. Snounieh (Arabic: سنونية, derived from the Arabic sin, meaning "tooth) is a dessert very similar to Burbara that is prepared to celebrate a babies first tooth.

=== Lent ===
Palestinian Christians observing Lent abstain from certain foods like eggs, meat, or dairy, and instead turn to vegetarian foods like hummus, falafel, mujaddara, or fried cauliflower, or make siyami (Arabic: صيامي, lit. 'fasting') Lenten adaptations of dishes like maqluba or stuffed leaves.

== Politics ==
Dishes like maqluba and musakhan are considered symbols of Palestinian identity. Many foods common to both Palestinian and Israeli cuisines, such as hummus and falafel, have been the subject of debates concerning cultural appropriation.

== See also ==
- Culture of Palestine
- List of Palestinian dishes
- Lebanese cuisine
- Levantine cuisine
- Jordanian cuisine
- Syrian cuisine
