= Sumaghiyyeh =

Palestinian dish

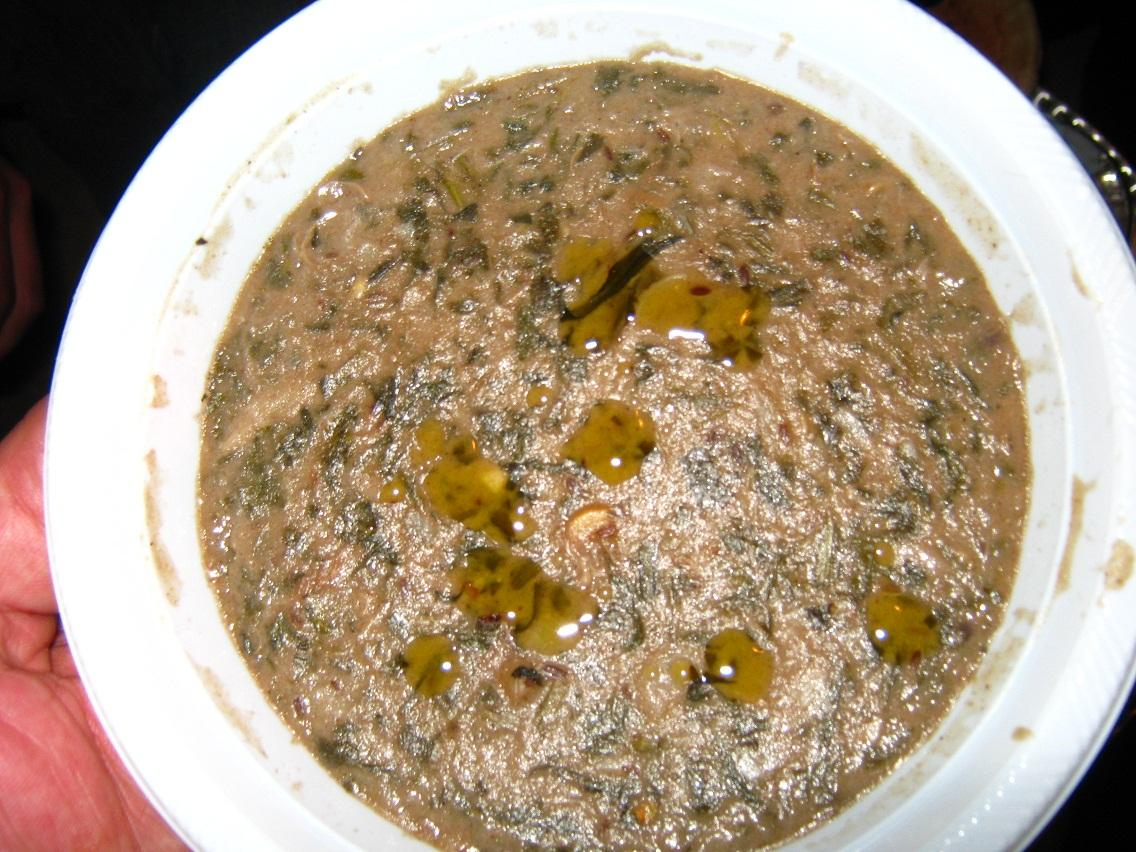
- Alternative names: Sumaqiyya, Sumagiyya, Sumaqqiyeh
- Type: Stew
- Place of origin: Arab World
- Region or state: Gaza Strip, Palestine, Arab World
- Main ingredients: Sumac, sautéed chopped chard, pieces of slow-stewed beef, and garbanzo beans

Sumaghiyyeh (Arabic: السماقية) is a Palestinian dish native to Gaza City, prepared traditionally on holidays. It receives its name from the spice sumac. It is a traditional Arab dish, already mentioned in the 11th century, among other dishes by Abū al-Muṭahhar al-Azdī in the story Ḥikāyat Abū al-Qāsim.

The ground sumac is first soaked in water and then mixed with Tahini (sesame seed paste), additional water, and flour for thickness. The mixture is then added to sautéed chopped chard, pieces of slow-stewed beef, and garbanzo beans. It is seasoned with dill seeds and chili peppers, fried with garlic in olive oil, then poured into bowls to cool. Pita bread is used to scoop it. In Gaza, the tahini used is usually "red tahini", which is made from toasted sesame seeds.

== History ==
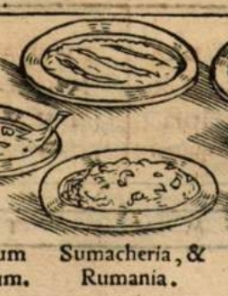
Sumacheria, from page 77 of Tacuinum sanitatis, written in 1533

According to historian Nawal Nasrallah, the 10th-Century cookbook by Ibn Sayyar al-Warraq titled Kitāb al-Ṭabīkh contained an entire section called في عمل السماقيات و الهارونيات (making summaqiyyat and haruniyyat), haruniyya referred to a variation of sumaqiyya that was attributed to Caliph Harun al-Rashid. The dish was said to be a favorite of the Caliph.

Later, the dish was mentioned again in a 13th-Century Syrian recipe, Summaqiya was also imported into Al-Andalus from the Mashriq region, a recipe for it can be found in the writings of Ibn Razīn al-Tujībī. Later mentions can be found in the 15th-Century, Ibn al-Mubarrad gives instructions for its preparation in Kitāb al-Ṭibāḫa.

Sumāqiyya appeared alongside rummaniyya in some European cookbooks between the 13th and 15th Centuries, and its name was Romanized as somacchia. One of the translated works it appeared in is the Tacuinum Sanitatis, which itself is a translation of the writings of 11th-Century Abbasid physician Ibn Butlan.

=== 21st century ===
During the blockade on the Gaza Strip which intensified in 2023, the chard traditionally used in the stew was replaced with foraged wild plants, like purslane and malva. Other ingredients like meat, tahini and dill seeds were completely omitted.

== Modern-day popularity ==
In Gaza, the dish is popular during special occasions like weddings and Eid, where batches of it are handed out to family, friends and neighbors.

Laila el-Haddad describes sumagiyyeh as "quite unknown" outside of Gaza; she also writes that the amount of meat in the dish acts as a measure of generosity. This variety of the dish is described as uniquely Palestinian even as it appears in numerous varieties described in medieval texts.

== Similar foods ==
Kebbeh sumakiyeh (Arabic: كبة سماقية) is a variation of kibbeh that is cooked in a sumac sauce.

== See also ==
- Arab cuisine
- Palestinian cuisine
