= Rummaniyeh =

Pomegranate-juice dish

Rummaniyyeh
- Alternative names: Rummaniyya, Rummaneyye
- Region or state: Arab world
- Main ingredients: Pomegranate juice

Rummaniyeh (Arabic: رمّانية) is an Arab dish made from lentils and pomegranate juice. Its origins date back to at least the 10th century.

== Etymology ==
Rummān (رمّان) means pomegranate in Arabic. The word rummaniyeh (also spelled rummaniyya) translates to "pomegranatey".

== History ==
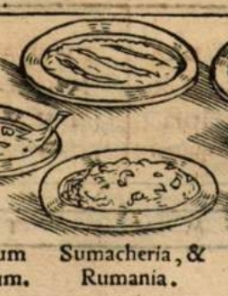
Rumania, from page 77 of Tacuinum sanitatis, written in 1533

During the Abbasid caliphate, many fruits and vegetables were used to sour stews and soups. Dishes soured with rumman (pomegranate) were called rummaniyyat or sometimes narbajat.

Rummaniya appeared alongside sumāqiyya in several European cookbooks between the 13th and 15th centuries, where its name was romanized as romania. They both appeared in the Tacuinum Sanitatis, a translation of a medicinal textbook of 11th-century Abbasid physician Ibn Butlan, as they were believed to have medicinal properties. The dish appeared as romania in some texts, which was initially thought to be a named derived from the Roman Empire as the texts did not credit any Arabic sources, historian Maxime Rodinson argued that it was likely imported from Arabic.

Rummaniyyeh also appeared in Ottoman Turkish translations of Arabic cookbooks, such as Kitâb-ı Me’kûlât and works by Ottoman author Mahmud ibn Məhəmməd Şirvani.

Rummaniyeh was a popular dish among Palestinians in the coastal area in cities like Jaffa, Ramla, and Lod. The 1948 Palestinian expulsion and flight popularized the dish in refugee communities in the Gaza Strip. During the Gaza war, pomegranate juice was replaced with sumac after the pomegranate trees in the strip were destroyed.

== Modern day ==
Rummaniyeh is a staple dish in Palestinian cuisine, where it is made as a stew of lentils, tahini, eggplants, pomegranate juice and pomegranate molasses, which is topped with parsley and pomegranate seeds and is eaten as is or with bread. In the Gaza strip, it is cooked in large communal pots and distributed to family members and neighbors. The Gazan version also adds red tahini (made with roasted sesame seeds) and dill seeds. The Palestinian variety of the dish is also called habbet rummaneh (Arabic: حبة رمانة).

Some Aleppan variations of kibbeh are made into a rummaniyeh with pomegrante juice.
