= Maqluba =

Dish served throughout the Levant

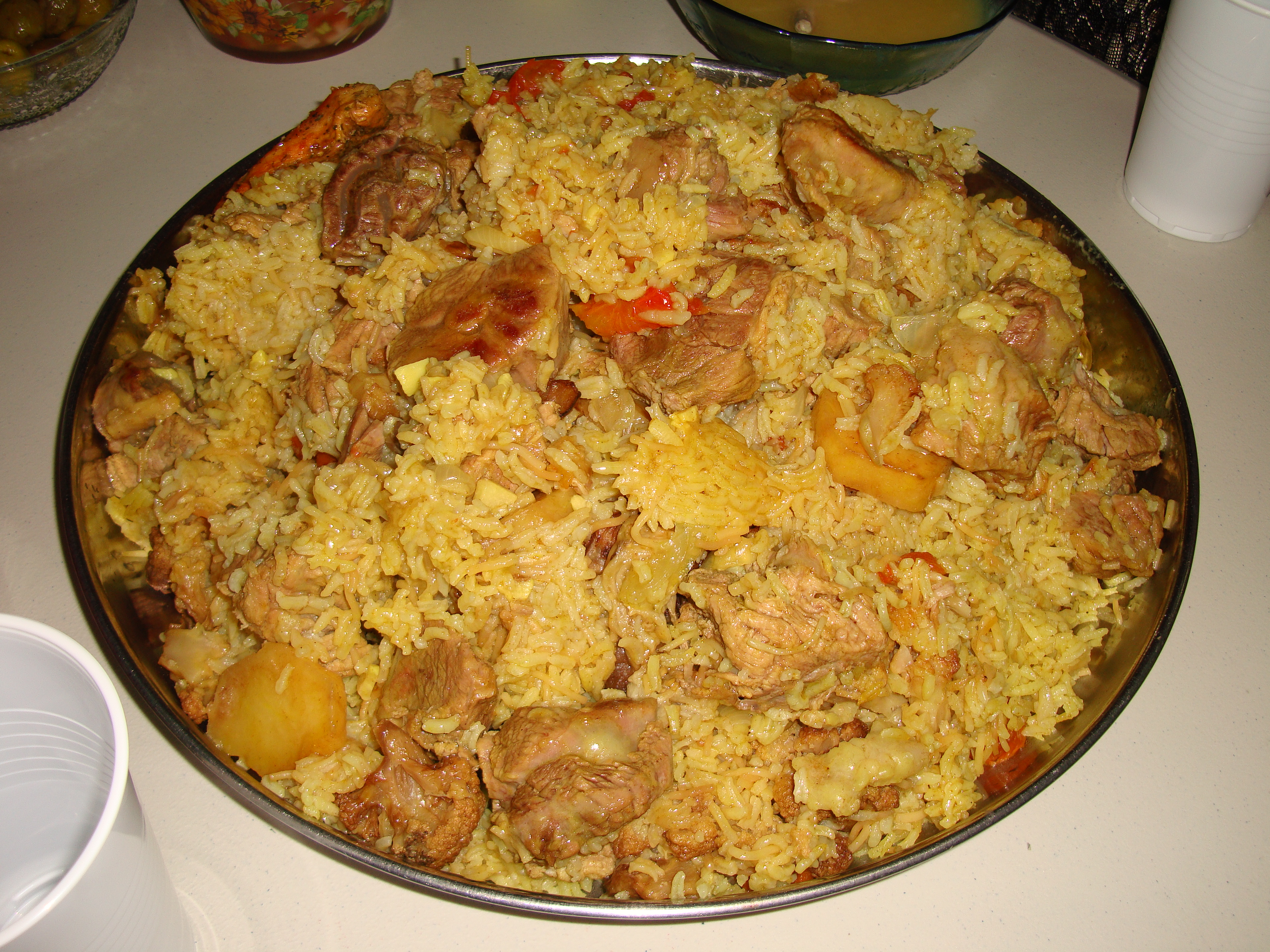
- Alternative names: Maaluba, maqlouba, maqlooba, maqloubeh, makluba, maklouba, makloubeh, magluba, maglouba
- Course: Meal
- Place of origin: Jordan, Lebanon, Palestine, Syria, Israel, Iraq
- Region or state: Levant, Mesopotamia
- Associated cuisine: Levantine (Jordanian, Lebanese, Palestinian, Syrian), Iraqi
- Serving temperature: Hot
- Main ingredients: Meat, rice, and vegetables (tomato, cauliflower, potato, eggplant)

Maqluba (also attested by a variety of other spellings in English; Arabic: مَقْلُوبَة, romanized: maqlūba, lit. 'upside-down') is a traditional Levantine dish, a variety of Pilaf that is popular across Palestine, Jordan, Syria, Lebanon, Israel, and Iraq. It consists of meat, rice, and fried vegetables placed in a pot which is flipped upside down when served, hence the name.

== History ==
The earliest mention of a dish called maqluba is found in a 13th-century cookbook, Kitāb al-Ṭabīkh (The Book of Dishes), written by Muhammad Baghdadi during the Abbasid Caliphate. The maqluba mentioned by Baghdadi is an egg dish rather than a pilaf.

According to one folk legend, the dish was served in 1187 to celebrate Saladin's successful capture of Jerusalem, prompting Saladin to inquire about the "upside-down dish", hence giving the dish its name. However, an Al Jazeera report notes that there are no historical records to substantiate this claim.

The People of Palestine, a 1921 book by American scholar Elihu Grant documenting Palestinian tradition, contained a description of maqluba:

Maḳlûbeh is a preparation of rice and eggplant cooked in a deep dish, and, when served, turned out, upside down; whence the name, which means "turned over."

== Ingredients ==
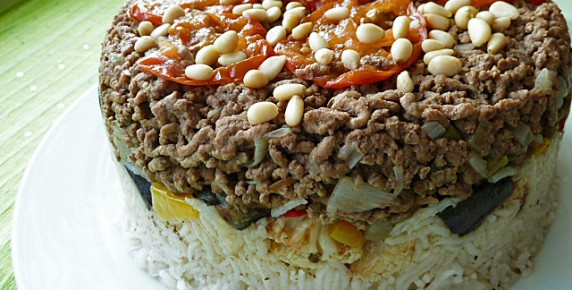
Maqluba showing layers

Maqluba can include various (fried) vegetables, such as tomatoes, potatoes, cauliflower, and eggplant, accompanied by either chicken or lamb. The most common are cauliflower and eggplant. All the ingredients are carefully placed in the pot in layers, so that when the pot is inverted for serving, the dish looks like a layer cake. Coastal cities often use fish in place of the meat.

Maqluba is typically garnished with pine nuts and chopped fresh parsley. It is sometimes served with salad and fresh yogurt, and is often prepared for feasts and large gatherings.

== Politics ==
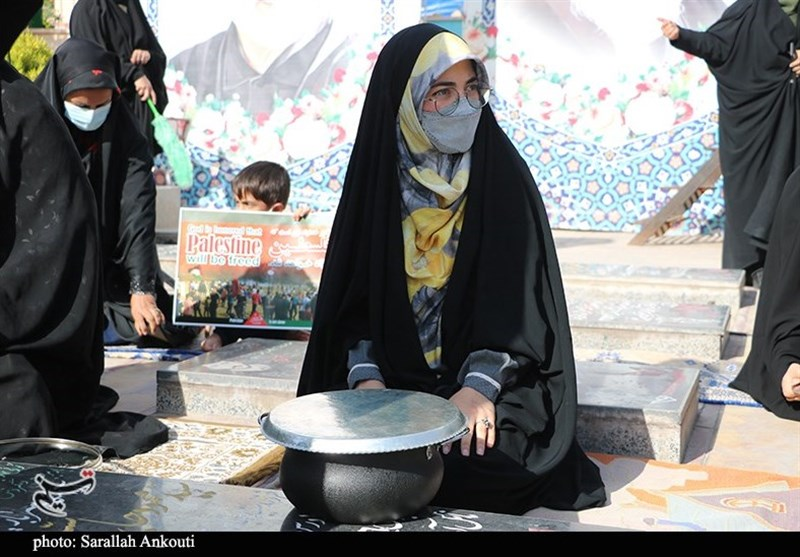
Maqluba about to be flipped at a pro-Palestine protest in Iran, 2021.

The dish has been a matter of controversy in the Israeli–Palestinian conflict, with Palestinians describing attempts to label the dish as Israeli as amounting to cultural appropriation. The dish has been used by Palestinian activists to mobilize people to join protests at Al-Aqsa Mosque in the Israeli-occupied East Jerusalem; in 2017, Israeli police arrested a Palestinian woman who had organized a maqluba eating gathering at Al-Aqsa.

Maqluba has been used as a pro-Palestine symbol in protests in countries like Iran and the United Kingdom.

Since the unsuccessful coup attempt in Turkey in 2016, which involved the Gülen movement, the dish has been seen as a "Gulenist delicacy" and eating or preparing it has been considered by some as evidence of membership of the movement.

== See also ==
- Arab cuisine
- Egyptian cuisine
- Israeli cuisine
- Jordanian cuisine
- List of casserole dishes
- Macaroni Hamin
- Palestinian cuisine
- Pilaf
