= Kibbeh =

Middle-eastern ground meat and bulgur dish

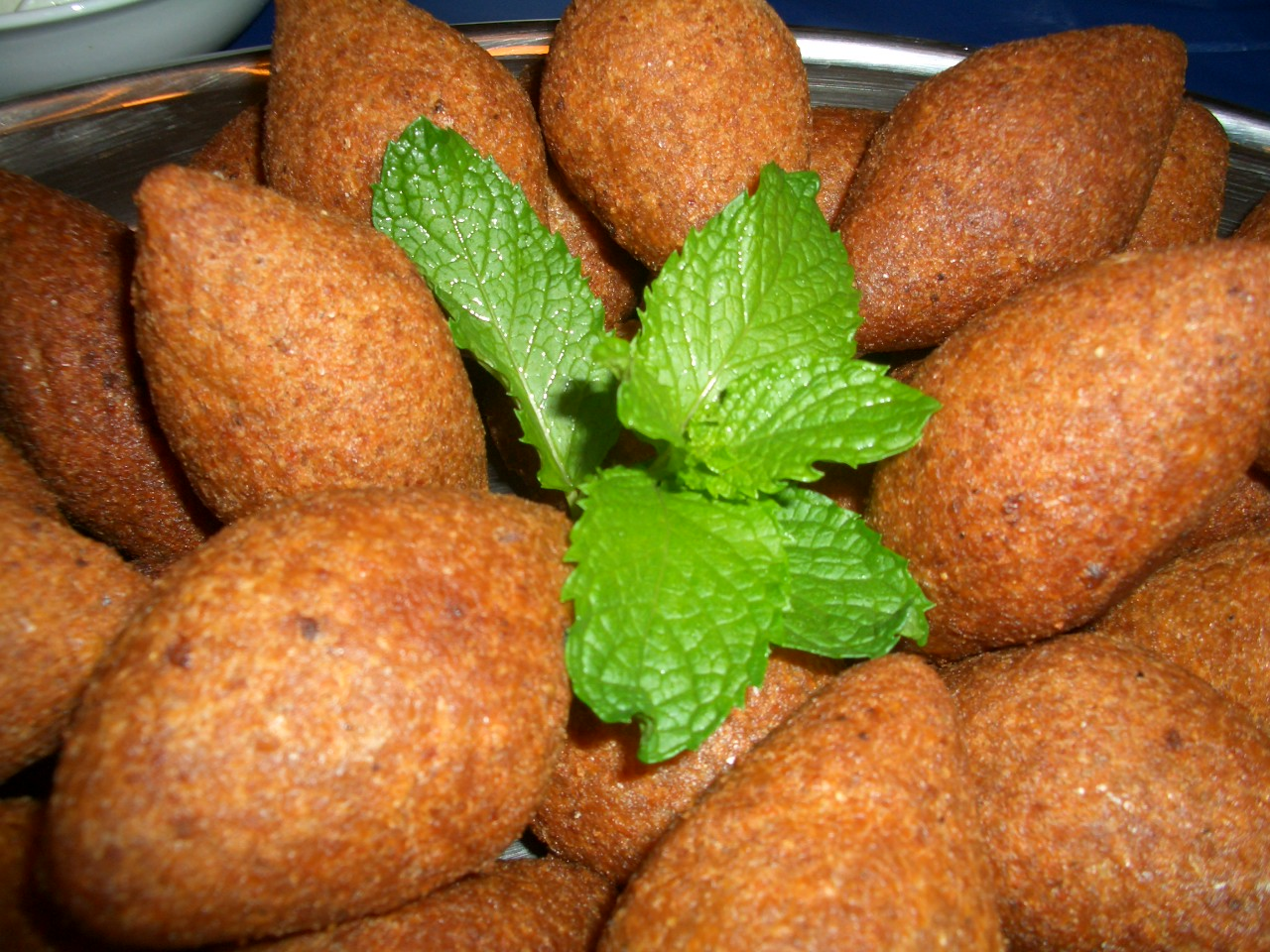
- Fried kibbeh raas (nabulsi kibbeh)
- Course: Meze
- Place of origin: Syria, Egypt, Iraq, Jordan, Armenia, Lebanon, Israel, Palestine, Turkey
- Region or state: Levant, Mesopotamia, Caucasus, East Mediterranean
- Serving temperature: Hot (or raw as kibbeh nayyeh)
- Main ingredients: Finely ground meat, cracked wheat (bulgur), and Levantine spices

Kibbeh (/ˈkɪbi/, also kubba and other spellings; Arabic: كبّة, romanized: kibba; Egyptian Arabic: كبيبة, romanized: kobeba) is a popular dish in the Arab world and the Levant in particular, made of spiced lean ground meat and bulgur wheat. Kibbeh is considered to be a national dish of Lebanon and Syria.

In Levantine cuisine, kibbeh is made by pounding bulgur wheat together with meat into a fine paste and forming it into ovoid shapes, with toasted pine nuts and spices. It may also be layered and cooked on a tray, deep-fried, grilled, or served raw. The Syrian city of Aleppo can lay claim to at least 17 types of kibbeh. In Mesopotamian cuisine, versions with rice or farina are found.

Outside of Lebanon and Syria, versions are found in Cyprus, Egypt, Israel, Palestine, the Persian Gulf, Armenia, and Turkey, and among Assyrian people. It is also found throughout Latin American countries that received substantial numbers of immigrants from the Levant during the late 19th and early 20th centuries, as well as parts of North America.

== Etymology ==
The modern word kibbeh (كبة) is derived from the Arabic root k-b-b (ك-ب-ب).

The use of kubbeh to designate stuffed food may have also been derived from the Akkadian language kubbu.

The 10th century cookbook by Ibn Sayyar al-Warraq referred to meatballs as kubab (singular kubba).

== History ==
As noted by food historian Nawal Nasrallah, the earliest mention of modern kibbeh, made with a filled shell of ground meat and grains, is in the 18th century work Taj al-'Arus min Jawahir al-Qamus. The text describes it as a disk of ground meat and rice flour made by the people of "al-Sham" (the Levant).

American Methodist missionary William McClure Thomson noted in his memoirs during his 1847 visit to Lebanon that kibbeh, then made by crushing wheat in mortar and pestle, was very popular. He described it as "the national dish of the Arabs", despite its association with the Levant. Swedish Orientalist Jacob Berggren described 8 types of kibbeh in his 1844 dictionary, and also mentioned a proverb about its social importance: "[...], without our koubbé, we would all have died".

The 1885 Beirut cookbook Ustadh al-Tabbakhin by author Khalil Khattar Sarkis provided 15 kibbeh recipes, including recipes for kibbeh labaniyyeh, kiyyeh bil siniyyeh, kibbeh mashwiyyeh, among others. The Comparative Encyclopedia of Aleppo by Syrian author Khayr al-Din al-Asadi (completed in 1971, published posthumously in 1981) described 58 different kinds of kibbeh.

== Variations ==
=== Levant ===
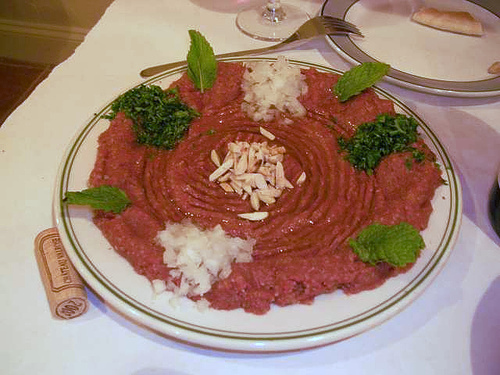
Kibbeh nayyeh

Kibbeh nayyeh is a raw dish made from a mixture of bulgur, very finely minced lamb or beef similar to steak tartare, and Levantine spices, served on a platter, frequently as part of a meze in Lebanon and Syria, garnished with mint leaves and olive oil, and served with green onions or scallions, green hot peppers, and pita or markouk bread. Because kibbeh nayyeh is raw, it requires high-quality meat to prepare and has been seen as a traditional way to honor guests.

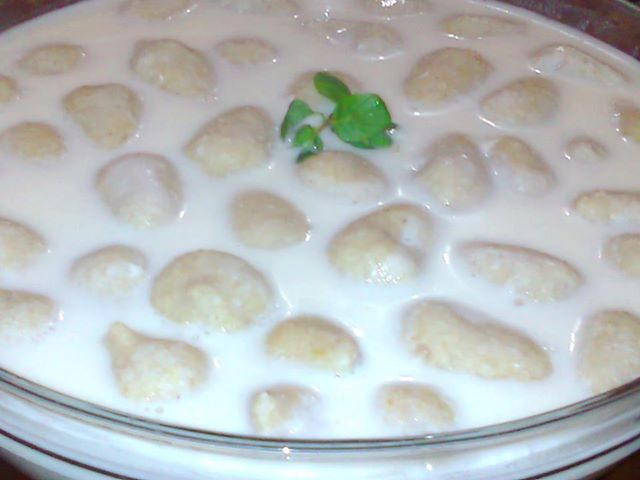
Levantine kibbeh labaniyeh

Kibbeh labaniyeh (Arabic: كبة لبنية) is a variant of kibbeh cooked in a yoghurt sauce and served over rice. It is popular in Lebanon and Syria. kibbeh mishwiyyeh (Arabic: كبة مشوية) is kibbeh that is grilled rather than fried.

Kibbeh bil siniyeh (Levantine Arabic: كبة بالصينية) is a variation of kibbeh in which the meat stuffing is sandwiched between two layers of kibbeh dough and then baked; it is popular in Lebanon and Syria.

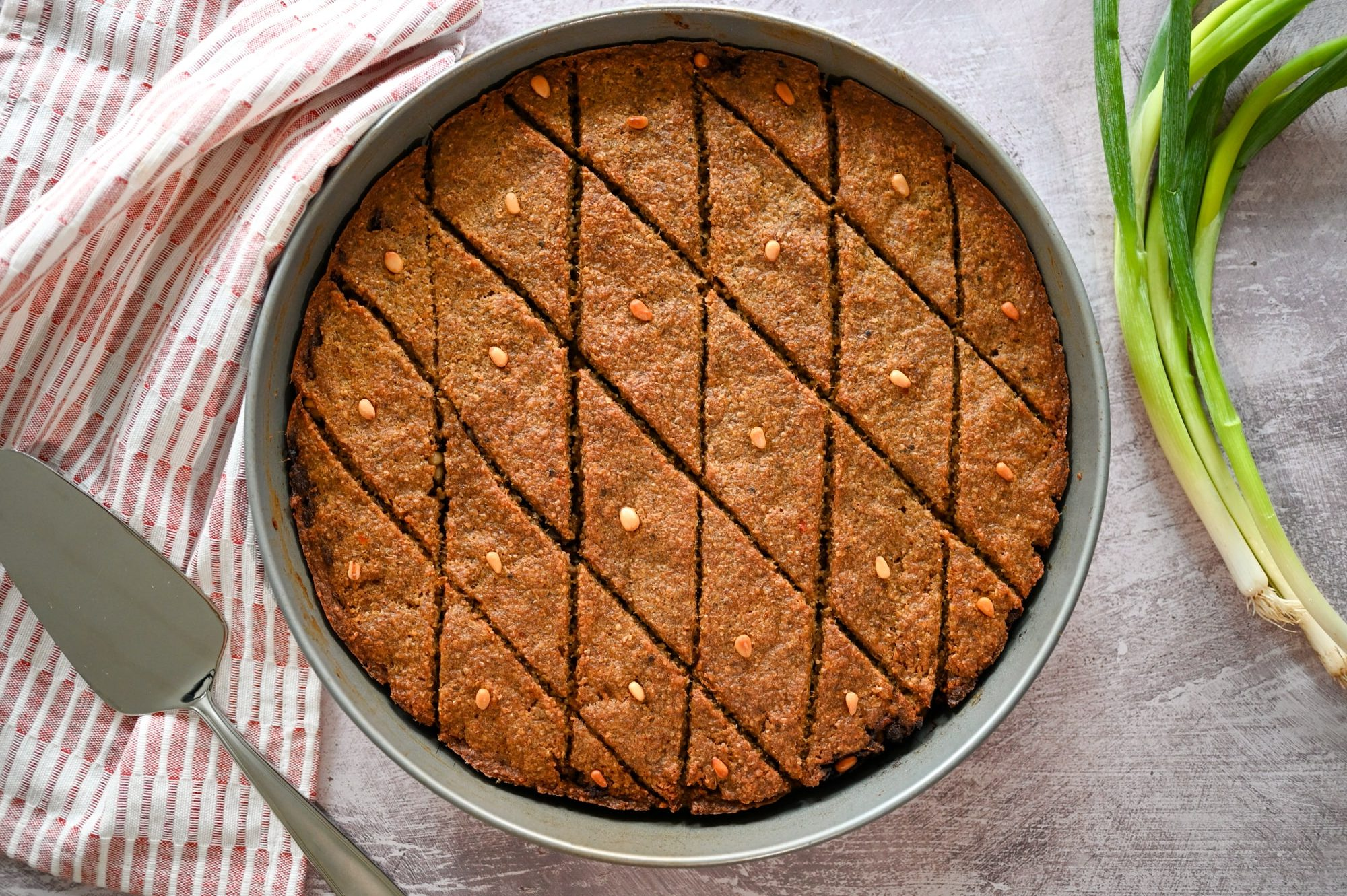
Kibbeh bil siniyeh (baked kibbeh in a tray)

==== Lebanon ====
In Lebanon, meatless versions of kibbeh exist, and are sometimes called "poor man's kibbe". The stuffing is made with onions, walnuts, and wheat. Kibbet samak, made using fish, is popular among Sunni Muslims in North Lebanon.

Potato kibbeh is a variation of kibbeh in which potato is mixed with the bulgur. It is often assembled in three layers: a potato layer, followed by the meat filling, then another potato layer on top. Author Claudia Roden describes it as an "oriental shepherd's pie." It is especially popular in Lebanon.

During Lent, Lebanese Christians prepare a vegetarian layered kibbeh made of pumpkin, onions, walnuts, chickpeas, and spinach.

==== Syria ====
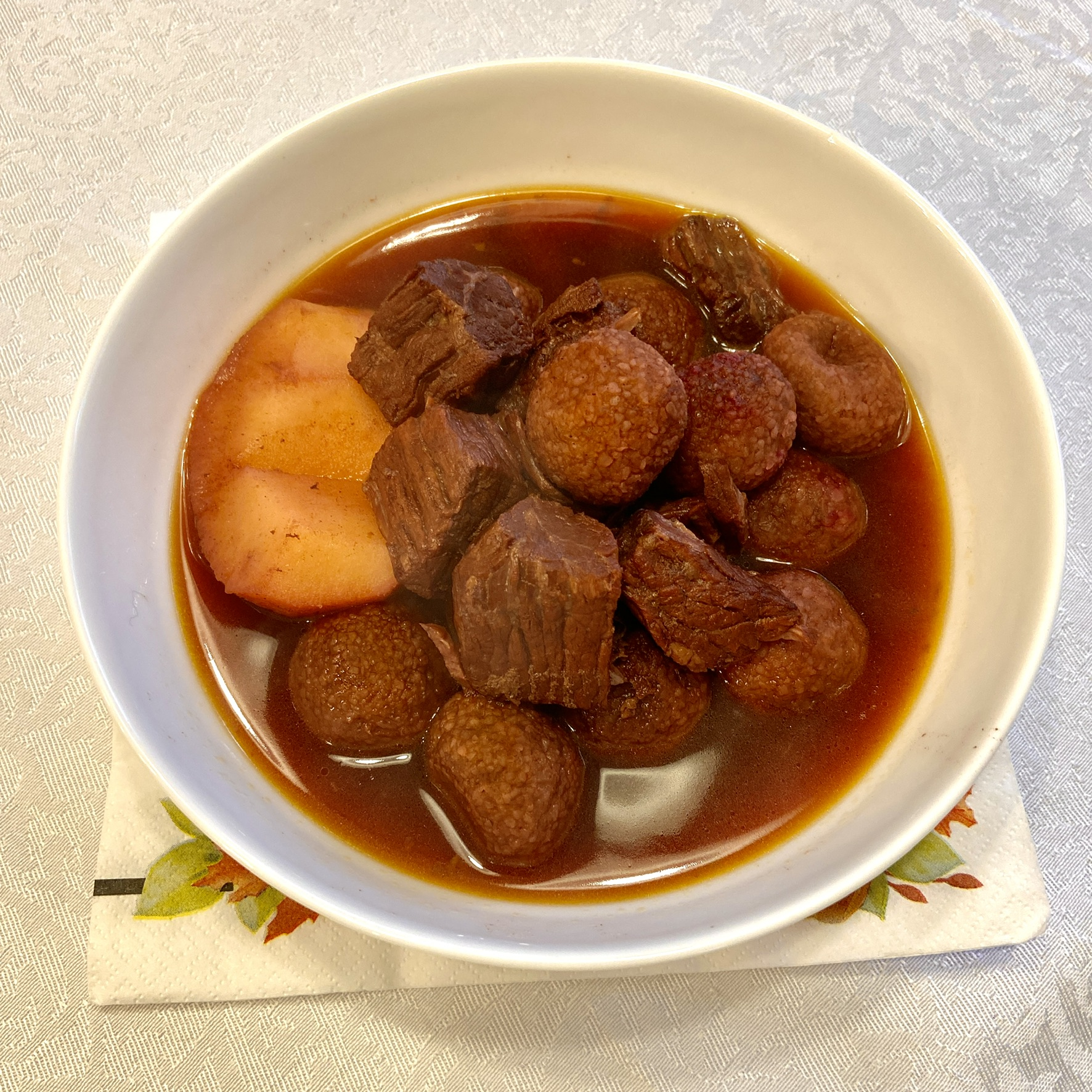
Kibbeh safarjaliyeh (quince kibbeh) with beef.

The city of Aleppo, Syria, is known for its many varieties of kibbe. These include kibbeh prepared with sumac (kibbe sumāqiyye), yogurt (kibbe labaniyye), quince (kibbe safarjaliyye), lemon juice (kibbe ḥāmḍa), pomegranate sauce (kibbeh rummaniyeh), cherry sauce, and other varieties, such as "disk" kibbeh (kibbe arāṣ), "plate" kibbeh (kibbe biṣfīḥa or kibbe bṣēniyye) and raw kibbeh (kibbeh nayyeh). Kibbeh sajiyeh (Arabic: كبة صاجية) is kibbeh shaped into a thin disk with a meat filling that is traditionally dipped in a yogurt sauce.

A Syrian soup known as kubbi kishk consists of kubbi ("torpedoes" or "footballs") in a yogurt (kishk) and butter broth with stewed cabbage leaves. Another soup, known as kibbeh hamda, consists of chicken stock with vegetables (usually leeks, celery, turnips and courgettes), lemon juice and garlic, with small kibbeh made with ground rice as dumplings. In the Syrian Jewish diaspora this dish is popular both for Pesach and as the pre-fast meal on the day before Yom Kippur.

=== Iraq ===
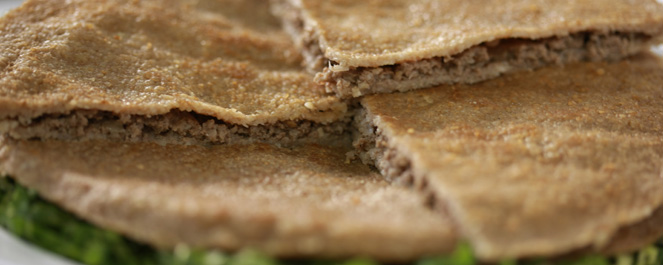
Kibbeh Moselleyh from Mosul

Kubba Mosul from Iraq is flat and round like a disc, named after the city of Mosul. Kubba Halab is an Iraqi version of kibbeh created with a rice and potato crust and named after the largest city in Syria, Aleppo. Kubbat shorba is an Iraqi and Kurdish version prepared as a stew, commonly made with turnips and chard in a tomato-based stew. It is often served with arak and various salads.

Among Kurdish Jews, there is a kubba soup flavored with aromatic thyme leaves during winter.

=== Israel ===
When Jews fled Iraq in the 1940s, 90 percent went to Israel, bringing traditional dishes with them. As a result, kubbeh is now a strong part of Israeli cuisine. Sometimes it is fried, and sometimes it is cooked in a soup.

=== Turkey ===
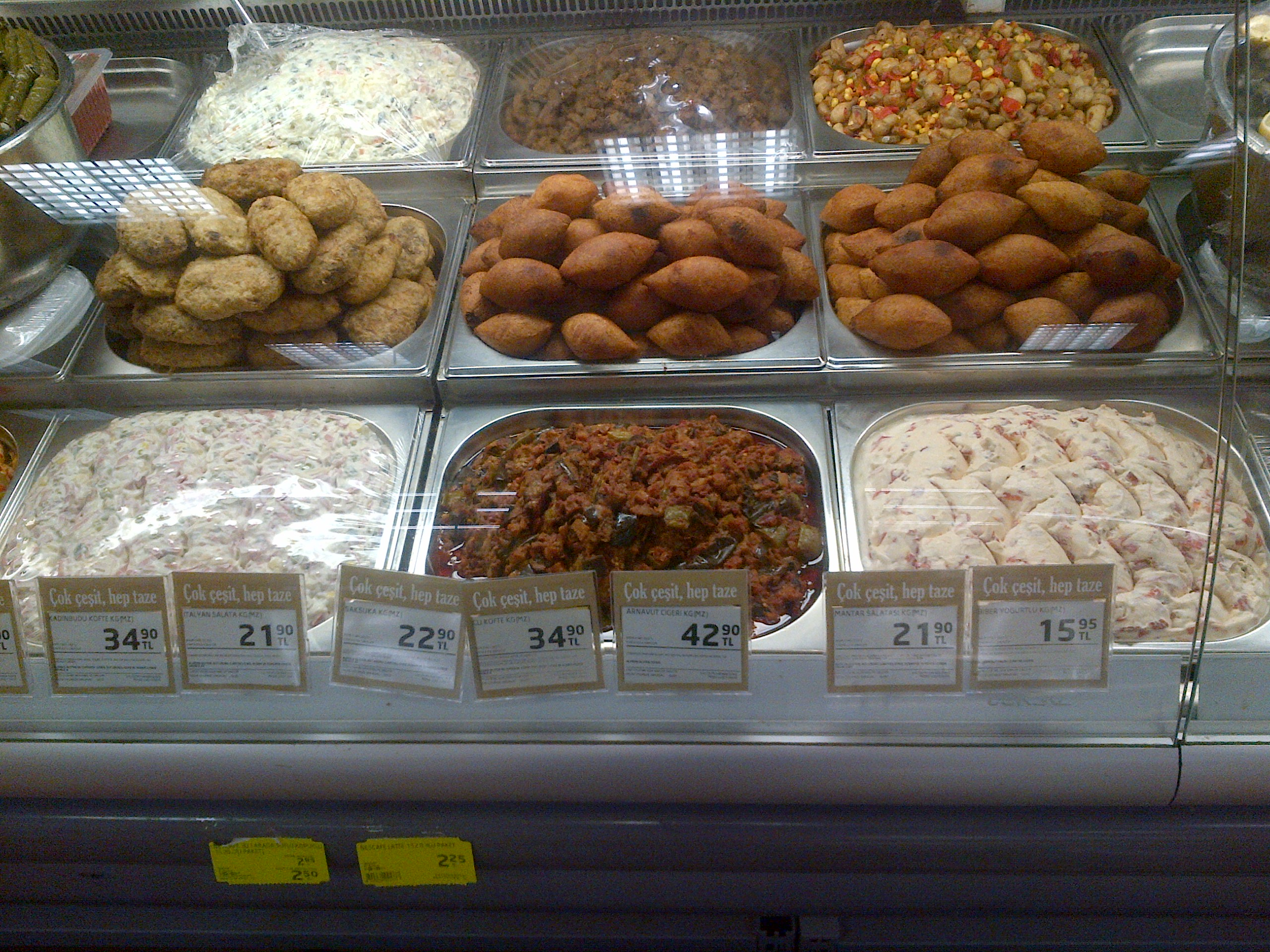
Içli köfte, in Ankara, Turkey.

In Turkey, kibbeh is called içli köfte. The outside shell can be made without or with tomato paste in different recipes.

Several variants of içli köfte are protected as geographical indications by the Turkish Patent and Trademark Office:

- The Adana variety of içli köfte. It is a grilled, skewer-cooked form of içli köfte.
- Malatya içli köftesi is a bulgur meatball that is boiled rather than fried.
- Polat içli köftesi is a boiled bulgur meatball with beef and onion filling.

=== Egypt ===
In Egypt, kibbeh is referred to as kobeba (Egyptian Arabic: كبيبة). Seafood variations of kobeba exist, such as shrimp kobeba, popular in Port Said.

=== Latin America ===
==== Brazil ====
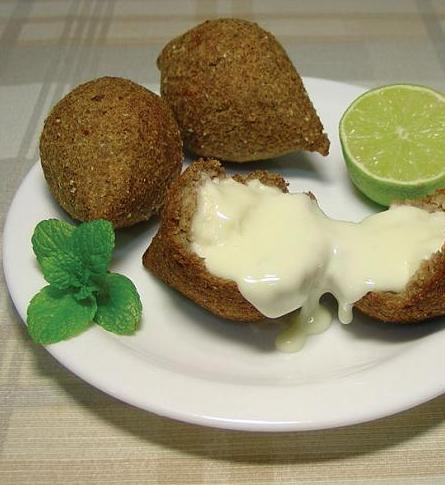
Fried quibe (Brazil)

Brazilian quibe is sometimes stuffed with Catupiry or another variety of requeijão, a sauce resembling ricotta and cream cheese. Most Brazilian quibe uses only ground beef, but other variations use tahini, carne de soja (texturized soy protein), seitan (Japanese wheat gluten-based meat substitute) or tofu (soybean curd) as stuffing.

In the Brazilian state of Acre, a variation of quibe called quibe de arroz (rice kibbeh) is made with a rice flour breading. It was created by Arab immigrants to Brazil who had no access to wheat in the remote Amazon region of Brazil.

==== Colombia ====
On Colombia's Caribbean coast, most local variations of the dish use ground beef instead of lamb, but the original recipe, or one with a mixture of beef and lamb, can be found served by the large Lebanese and Syrian population of the area. The dish has acquired almost vernacular presence and is frequently served in social occasions at both Arab and non-Arab households. When served as an adopted local dish, it is offered often as a starter along with other regional specialties, including empanadas, deditos and carimañolas.

==== Dominican Republic ====
The Dominican version was brought to the Dominican Republic by Lebanese immigrants.

==== Mexico ====
Some regional Syrian and Lebanese dishes combine kibbeh with elements taken from Latin American cuisine; for example, it is typical of Syrian Mexicans to eat traditional kibbeh with salsa verde.

== Culture ==
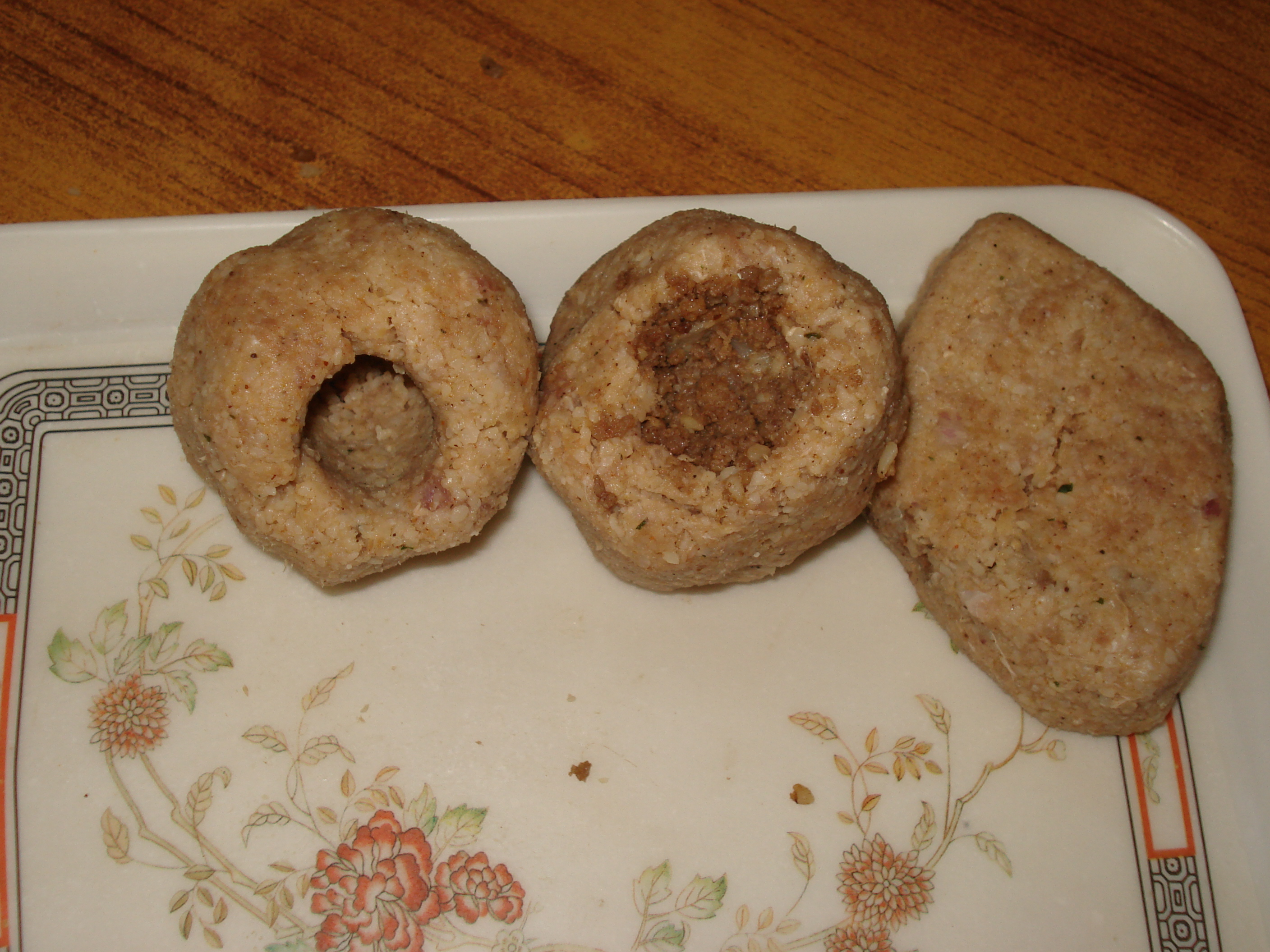
Uncooked kibbeh being prepared

Kibbeh is considered by many to be a difficult dish to prepare, and as such, the quality of kibbeh is considered to be a benchmark for the skill of a cook in Iraq and the Levant. Numerous mentions of kibbeh can be found in Aleppo Arabic folk proverbs.

== See also ==
- Falafel
- List of deep-fried foods
- List of Middle Eastern dishes
- List of stuffed dishes
