= Laila el-Haddad =

Palestinian author and public speaker based in the United States

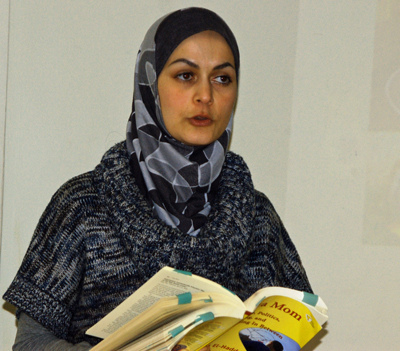
- Laila El Haddad in 2012
- Born: Kuwait
- Occupation: Author
- Website: www.lailahaddad.com

Laila El-Haddad (Arabic: ليلى الحداد) is a Palestinian author and public speaker based in the United States. She lectures on Gaza, the intersection of food and politics, and contemporary Islam. She is also a policy advisor with Al-Shabaka: the Palestinian Policy Network.

She is the author of Gaza Mom: Palestine, Politics, Parenting, and Everything In Between (Gaza Mama: Politics and Parenting in Palestine), co-author of The Gaza Kitchen: A Palestinian Culinary Journey and co-editor of Gaza Unsilenced.

== Personal life and background ==
El-Haddad was born in Kuwait and raised primarily in Saudi Arabia, where her parents worked, and she spent her summers in Gaza.

She traveled to the United States to attend Duke University, and then went on to receive her MPP from Harvard's Kennedy School of Government, where she was awarded the Clinton Scholarship for Palestinian graduate students. She moved to Gaza to work as a journalist while her husband remained in the US. The experience of constantly waiting, whether for documentation or for borders to open, informs her take on the issues that Palestinians face today.

== Life and career ==
From 2003 to 2007, El-Haddad was the Gaza correspondent for the al-Jazeera English website. She covered the Gaza Disengagement in 2005 and Palestinian parliamentary elections in 2006. El-Haddad co-directed Tourist With A Typewriter Production Company's film Tunnel Trade.

She previously authored a blog called Raising Yousuf: Diary of a Mother Under Occupation also known as Gaza Mom. The website won the Brass Crescent Award for "best Mideast blog", was nominated as best Mideast blog in the 2007 Bloggies Award, was selected as Blog of the Day by www.BlogAwards.com, and was chosen as a Blog of Note by www.Blogspot.com.

In 2010, she compiled choice blog entries and other writing into a book, Gaza Mom: Palestine, Politics, Parenting, and Everything In Between.

She has been published in The Economist, The Guardian, The Washington Post, The International Herald Tribune, The Baltimore Sun, New Statesman, Le Monde diplomatique, and Saveur, and she has been a guest on al Jazeera, NPR stations, CNN, and the BBC.

In 2025, her essay "A Cuisine Under Siege" published in Saveur won a James Beard Award in the Personal Essay with Recipes category.

== Writing ==
El-Haddad has published two books. Gaza Mom: Palestine, Politics, Parenting, and Everything In Between, published in 2010, is a compilation of El-Haddad's blogs and other writing about her daily life as she covers the story of Gaza while living it and trying to explain it to her children. In 2013, she co-authored The Gaza Kitchen: A Palestinian Culinary Journey with Maggie Schmitt; this cookbook of recipes from across the Gaza Strip both explores the food heritage of the region and tells the stories of Gazan women and men to portray the reality of Palestinian life from a personal perspective.
