= Hergma =

Maghrebi trotter stew

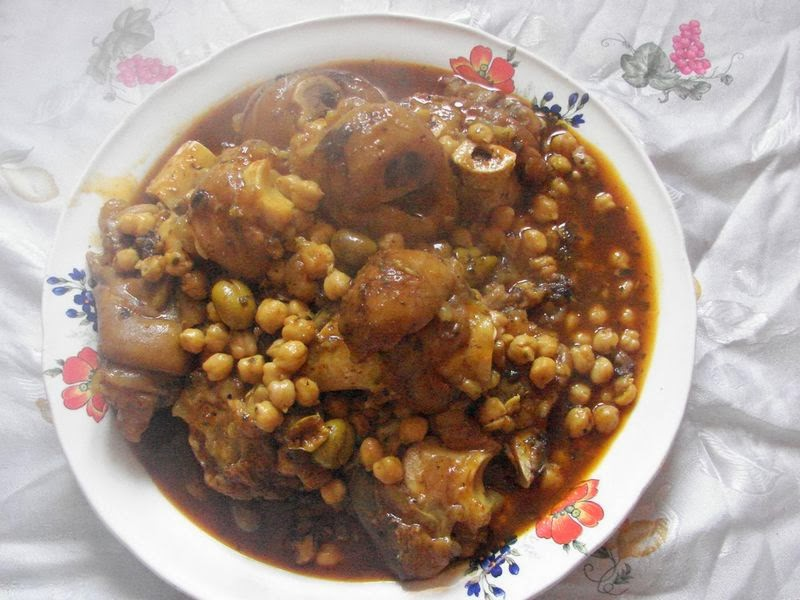
- Moroccan-style hergma
- Alternative names: ifenza; kerʻine; loubia bil kerʻine
- Type: stew (offal); tagine/lablabi
- Associated cuisine: Maghrebi cuisine
- Created by: Mizrahi Jews
- Main ingredients: cow's trotters, sheep's trotters or goat's trotters
- Ingredients generally used: wheatberries, chickpeas
- Similar dishes: bouzellouf; kawareʻ; khash; paya

Hergma (Note: also hregma, ḥarqma) (Arabic: الهركمة, lit. 'trotter' (synecdoche); Moroccan Arabic: كرعين, romanized: kerʻine; (Note: also kour3ine) Algerian Arabic: لوبيا بالكرعين, romanized: loubia bil kerʻine; Standard Moroccan Tamazight: ⵉⴼⵏⵣⴰ, ifenza) is a Maghrebi cuisine stew featuring stewed trotters (the feet of ungulate animals). The dish is largely cooked on Eid al-Adha with the trotters of the sacrificial animal, but also served year-round at souks, and enjoyed during Ramadan. In Moroccan cuisine, hergma is a tagine; in Tunisian cuisine, hergma is a lablabi featuring other offal along with the trotters, such as heart and tripe.

== Preparation and consumption ==
The trotters are considered a core ingredient due to the gelatin that emulsifies into the broth, making it thick. Trotters used include cow's trotters, sheep's trotters or goat's trotters; pig's trotters are haram/treif. Hergma is served as a street food at souks as well as a breakfast food; it is eaten by hand with khobz.

In Algerian cuisine, hergma (loubia bil kerʻine), particularly in Algiers, is made with beans and lentils. It is typically served alongside babbouche, a snail dish. In Moroccan cuisine, the dish is a type of tagine, baked in an earthenware pot; a typical recipe for Moroccan hergma is sheep's trotters with wheatberries, chickpeas and raisins. In Tunisian cuisine, hergma is a soupier lablabi featuring other offal along the trotters, such as heart and tripe.

== History ==
Hergma is descended from the Sephardic cuisine dish hamin (adafina), a Sabbath stew brought by Jewish expats to the Maghreb from the 1492 expulsion of Jews from Spain. The term "harqma" was documented in the 1505 Vocabulista arauigo en letra castellana by Pedro de Alcalá; definitions included cow's trotters, ratatouille, intestines, and butcher's scraps.

Hergma was a favorite dish of Hassan II of Morocco.

== See also ==
- bouzellouf a.k.a. bacha, an Algerian cuisine stewed sheep's head, sometimes with sheep's trotters, popular in Annaba
