= Feet as food =

Various animals' feet are consumed as food, such as:

- Chicken feet
- Cow's trotters
- Pig's trotters
- Sheep's trotters

== See also ==
- Frog legs
