= Pig's trotters à la Sainte-Menehould =

French pig's trotters dish

Pig trotters à la Sainte-Menehould
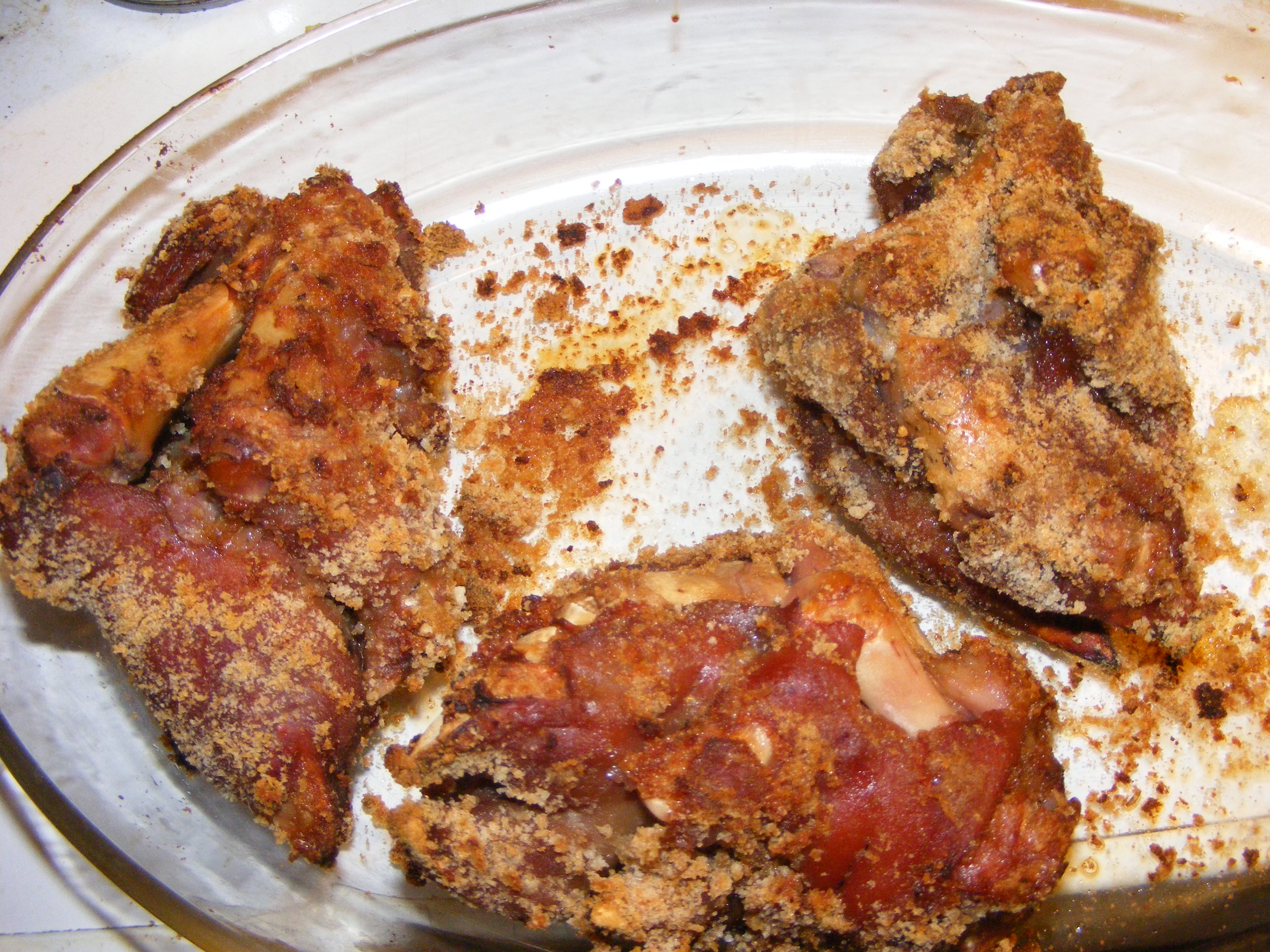
- Place of origin: Sainte-Menehould
- Region or state: Marne, France
- Associated cuisine: French cuisine
- Invented: by 1435
- Main ingredients: Pig's trotters
- Ingredients generally used: Onion, carrots, shallots, garlic, bouquet garni, cloves, white wine
- Variations: Sheep's trotters, veal

Pig trotters à la Sainte-Menehould (French: Pieds de porc à la Sainte-Menehould) is a French cuisine dish of pig's trotters that is simmered for hours, breaded, and pan-fried; the bones are soft enough to eat. The dish is a delicacy of Sainte-Menehould, dating to at least the 15th century.

== History ==
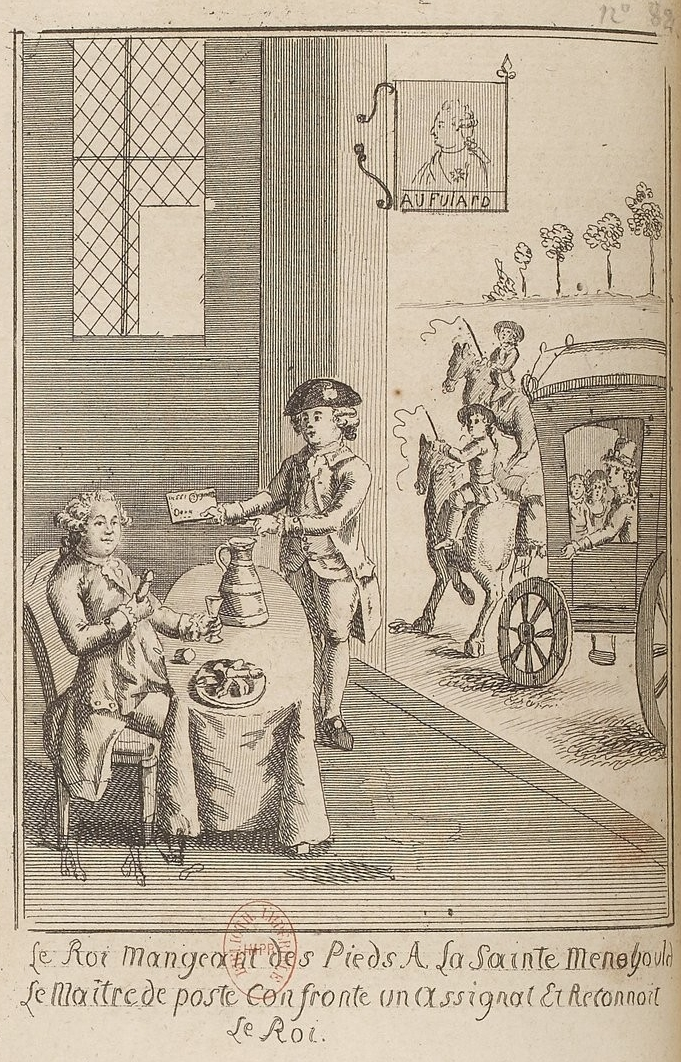
Image of Louis XVI eating pig trotters à la Sainte-Menehould during the Flight to Varennes; from Révolutions de France et de Brabant, edited by Camille Desmoulins, 1791

The dish was first attested to during the reign of Charles VII of France, where he was served the dish in Sainte-Menehould in 1435. The dish began to be prepared with "sauce à la Sainte-Menehould" in the 17th century; the sauce was later documented by August Escoffier.

According to Camille Desmoulins, during the 1791 Flight to Varennes, Louis XVI and the French royal family stopped in Sainte-Menehould and partook in pig trotters à la Sainte-Menehould. The royals were ultimately arrested in Varennes-en-Argonne, having been recognized and reported to revolutionary authorities from their stop in Sainte-Menehould.

Alexandre Dumas popularized the dish when it was published in the 1873 Grand dictionnaire de cuisine.

== Preparation ==
The trotters are trussed to hold their shape and simmered with onion, carrots, shallots, garlic, bouquet garni, cloves, and white wine for at least four hours; some recipes call for twelve or 24 hours. The cooked trotters are cut lengthwise, breaded with breadcrumbs and eggs, and pan-fried before serving.

Pig's trotters à la Sainte-Menehould are traditionally served with "sauce à la Sainte-Menehould", a butter-based sauce including onion, white wine or champagne, vinegar, Reims mustard, bay leaf, parsley and thyme.

== Variants ==
In 1784, Fernand Benoit wrote that the Polish count August Fryderyk Moszyński was served sheep's trotters à la Sainte-Menehould at an inn in Avignon. In the short story The System of Doctor Tarr and Professor Fether by Edgar Allan Poe, a dish of veal à la Sainte-Menehould is described.
