= Syltelabb =

Norwegian pig's trotter dish

Schematic representation of the main pork cuts, nr.14 is Syltelabb.

Syltelabb is a Norwegian traditional dish, usually eaten around and before Christmas time, made from boiled, salt-cured pig's trotter. They are traditionally eaten using one's fingers, as a snack food. They are sometimes served with beetroot, mustard and fresh bread or with lefse or flatbread. Historically syltelabb is served with the traditional Norwegian juleøl (English: Christmas Ale), beer and liquor (like aquavit). This is because Syltelabb is a very salty dish. The Norwegian word syltelabb, consists of the two words sylte and labb. Sylte means preserved. The word labb means pig feet or paw.

In 2006, the world championship in pig's trotter eating was held in Brokelandsheia, where the comedian Kristopher Schau took part.
