= Fatteh =

Arab dish

فتّة / Fatteh / Fetté
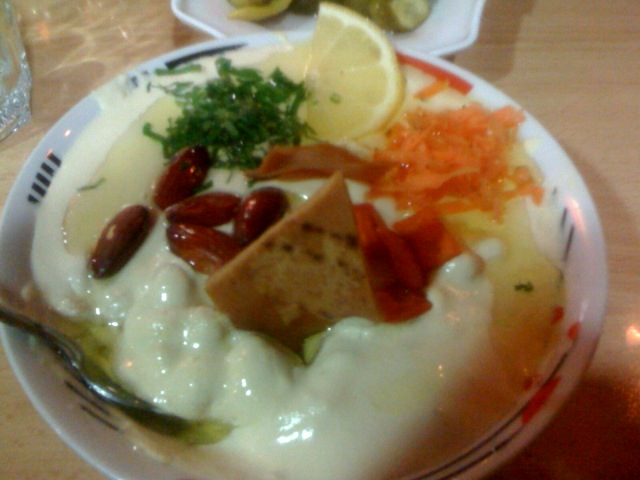
- A Damascene fetté with grilled almonds and clarified sheep butter
- Course: Breakfast or Main
- Place of origin: Middle East
- Serving temperature: Warm
- Main ingredients: Flatbread, yogurt, chickpeas, oil

Fatteh (Arabic: فتّة meaning crushed or crumbs, also romanized as fette, fetté, fatta or fattah) is a dish eaten in the Arab world consisting of pieces of fresh, toasted, grilled, or fried flatbread covered with other ingredients that vary according to region. It is also sometimes referred to as shâmiyât (Arabic: شاميات "Damascene") in the Levant area.

Mixing stale, toasted or fresh bread into food is a common technique in Arab cuisine.

== Preparation ==
Fatteh was traditionally used as a way to make use of stale bread, as well as bulk dishes in the absence of other foods. Generally, a layer of crumbled bread is placed at the bottom, topped with layers of other foods. The bread may or may not be toasted.

== Etymology ==
Fatteh is derived from Arabic fatta (فتة), which is derived from the Arabic root f-t-t (فتت) meaning to "tear" or "break apart".

== History ==
It is a common belief that fatteh dates back to Pharonic Egypt. Tharid, a dish said to be a favorite of Prophet Mohammed, is considered by some to be a fatteh dish.

Similar dishes to fatteh were mentioned in the 10th century Arabic cookbook by Ibn Sayyar al-Warraq. Fatteh was a popular dish in the Fatimid Caliphate during the 10-12th centuries.

== Regional variations ==
Fatteh is an ancient dish found in the Mashriq region of the Arab world as well as Egypt. Fetté dishes include a wide variety of regional and local variations, some of which also have their own distinct names.

=== Yemen ===
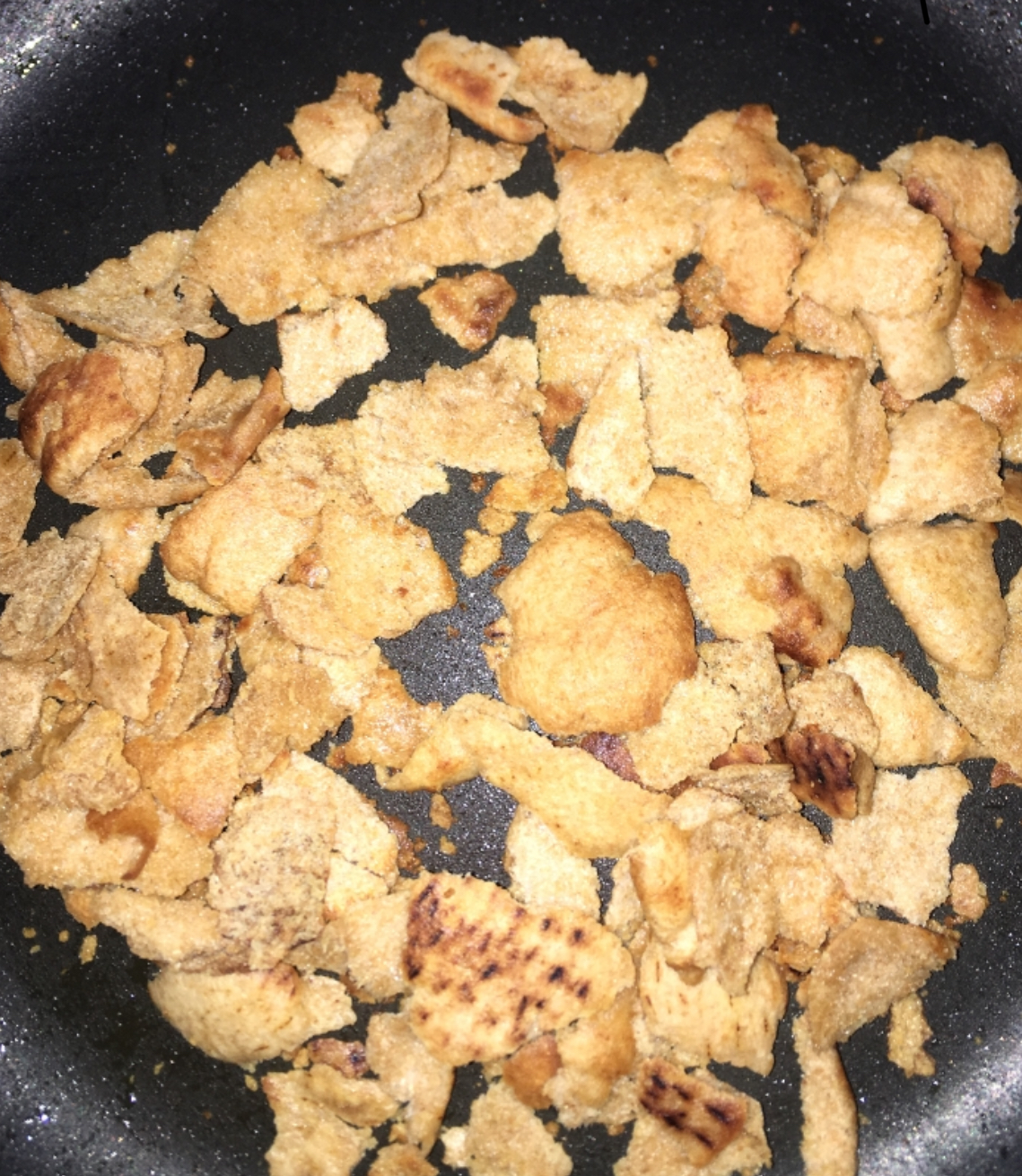
Yemeni fatoot; bread toasted in samneh

Many variations of fatteh can be found in Yemeni cuisine, this includes both sweet and savory versions. Fattah Tammer (Arabic: فتة تمر) is a sweet version made with honey and date palm.

Another name for fatta in Yemen is fatoot or ftut (Arabic: فتوت). Variations of fatta called ftout and fatoot samneh are popular among Yemenite Jews, and are still made in Yemen today.

=== Persian Gulf ===
In Eastern Arabian cuisine, tharid is a popular fatteh dish, its made with meat, vegetables, and broth.

=== Egypt ===
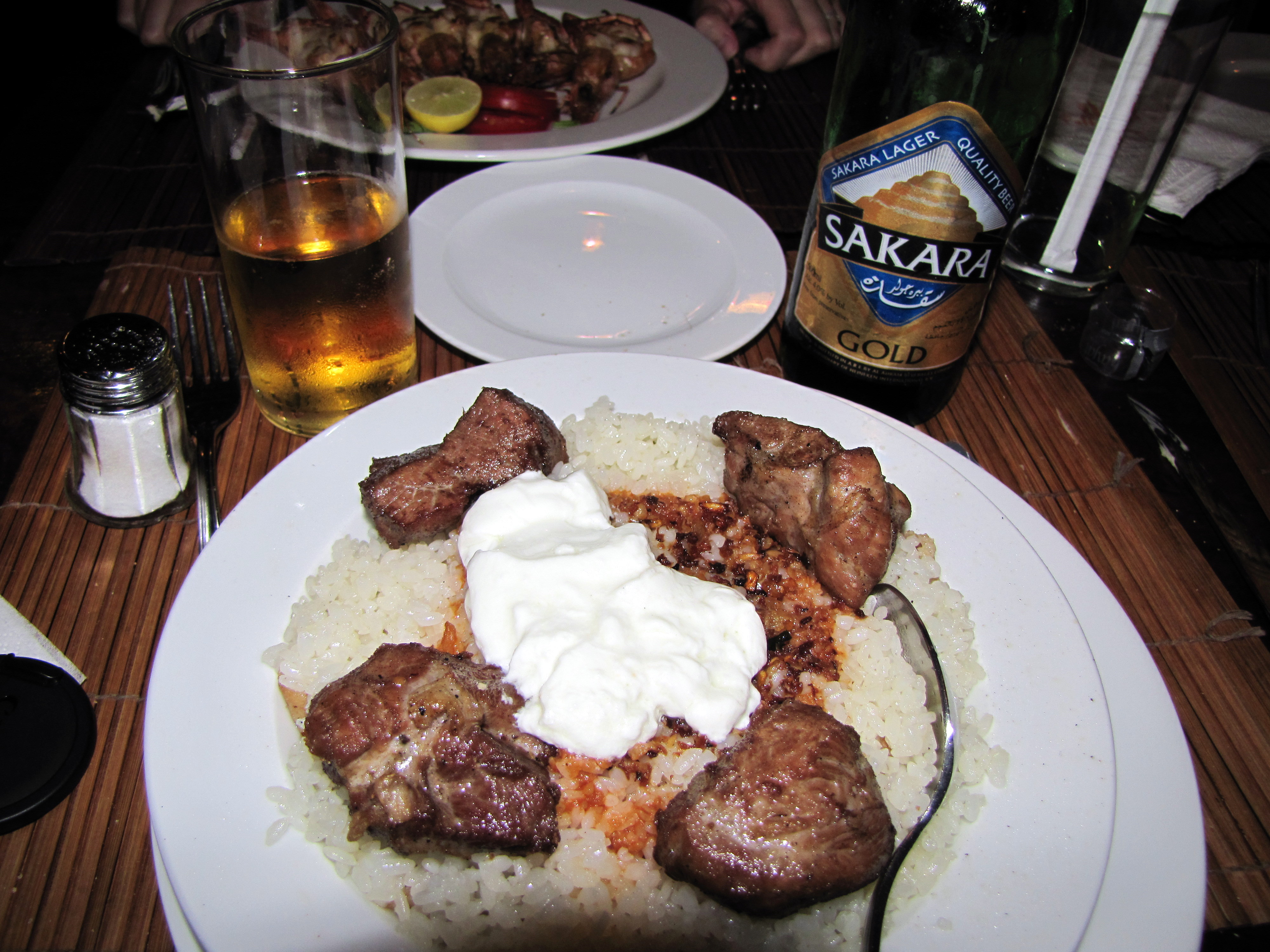
Egyptian fatta

Egyptians prepare a dish called "fatta" as a feast meal. It is prepared on special occasions, such as to celebrate a woman's first pregnancy or for Eid al-Fitr and Eid al-Adha. It is made with a garlic and vinegar flavored meat soup and crispy flatbread served in a bowl with rice and a garlic tomato sauce. Coptic Christians prepare this fatteh on Christmas.

Fattat kawāriʻ (فتة كوارع) is a fatteh traditionally prepared on Eid al-Adha in Egypt with feet of the animal slaughtered for the holiday.

=== Morocco ===
Moroccan rfissa can be considered is a variety of fatteh; its base is of crumbled thin bread that is soaked in broth.

=== Iraq ===
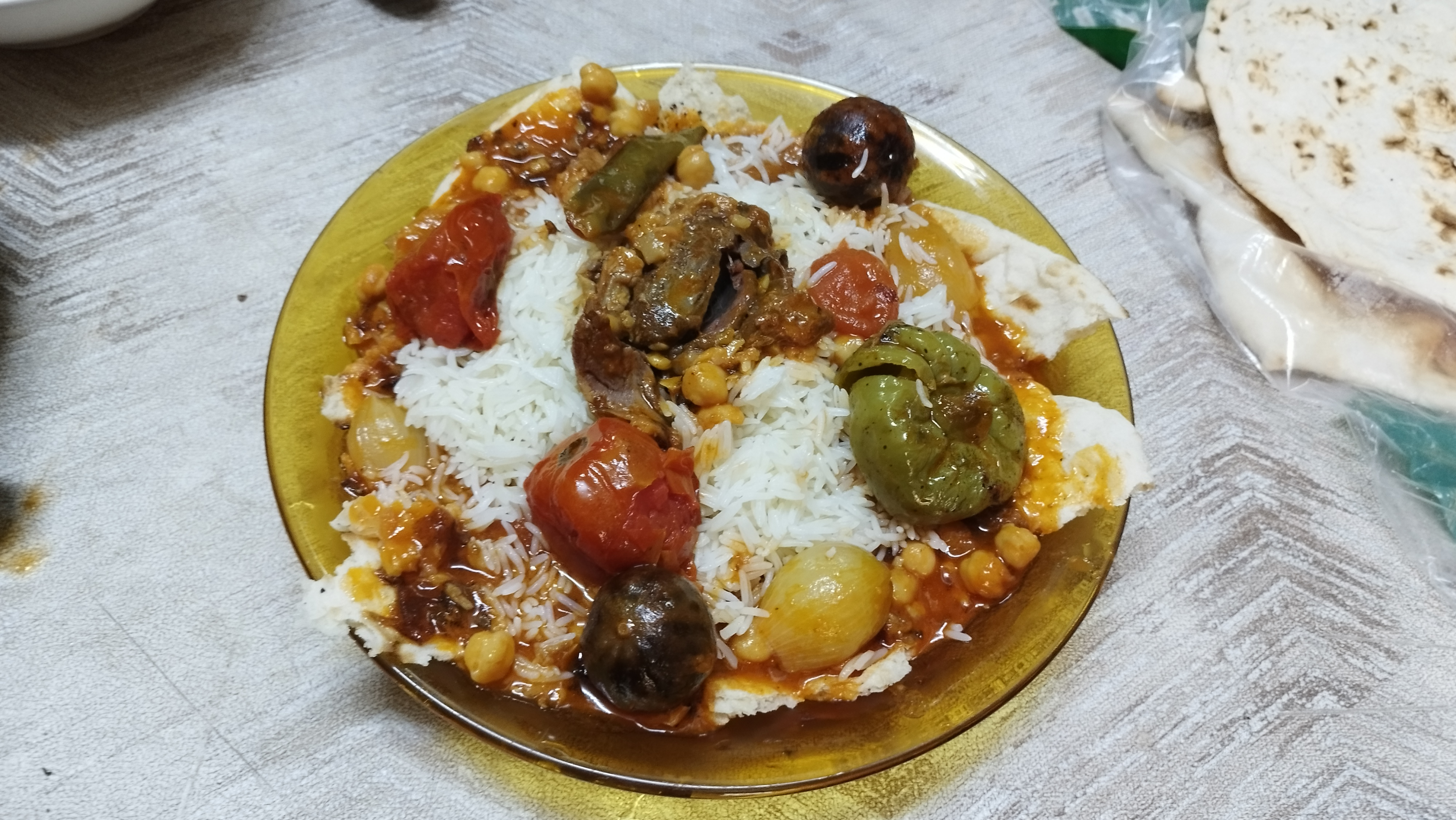
A regional variety of Iraqi tashrib

Tashrib (Arabic: تشريب) is an Iraqi variety of fatteh, made with bread soaked in broth and topped with red meat or chicken.

=== Levant ===
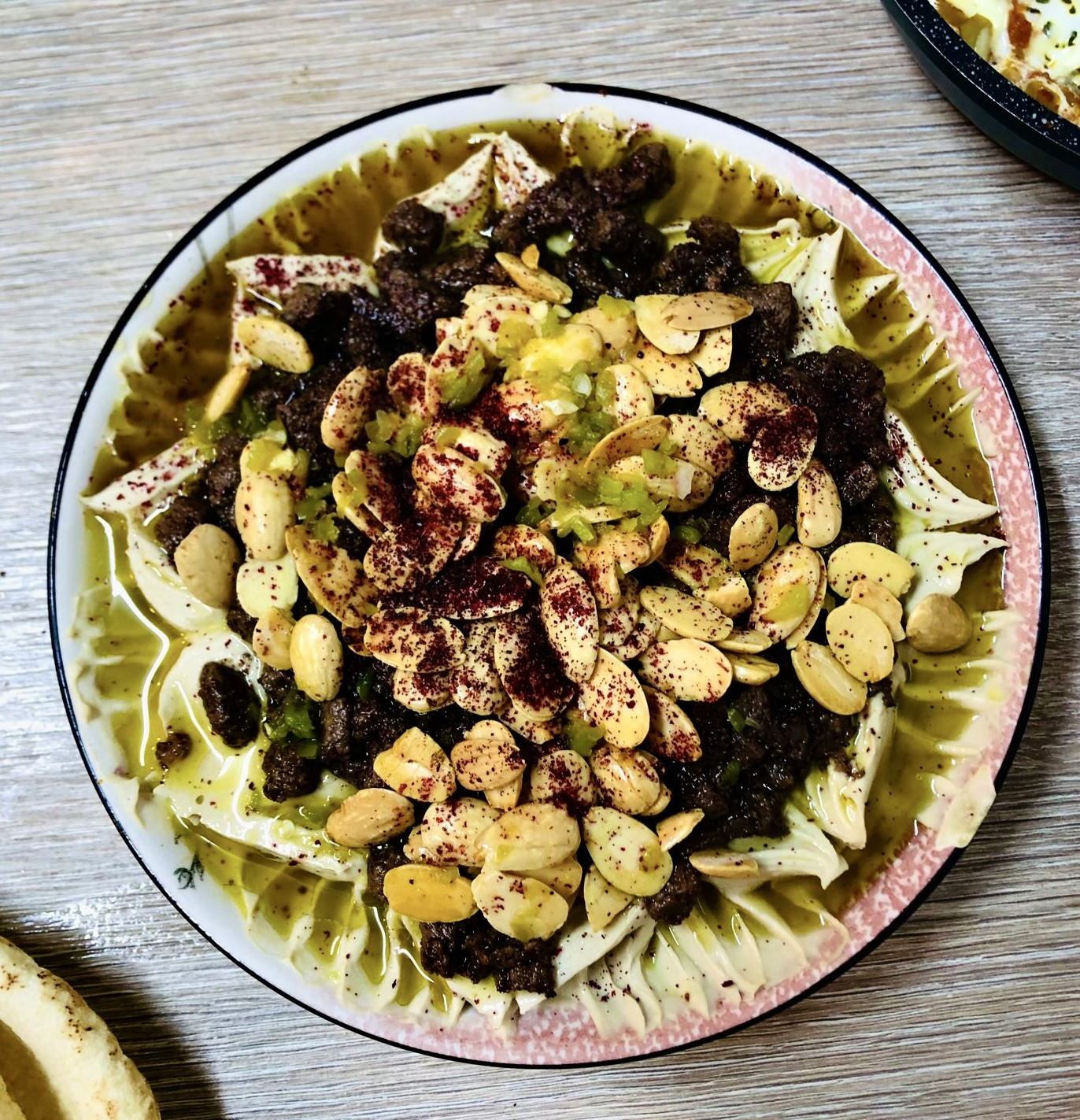
Hummus Fatteh with lamb Meat and Spiced Chickpeas.

Many variations of fatteh exist in the Levant region, one of the most common variations is Fattet Hummus, which itself has its own regional variations across Jordan, Syria, Lebanon, and Palestine, its main ingredients are bread, chickpeas, and tahini. Nuts, ground meat, as well as many other toppings can be added for garnish. Fatteh is also known as tis'iyyeh (Arabic: تسقية) in the Levant.

Another popular Levantine variation is fattet betinjen (Arabic: فتة باذنجان), which is made with fried or roasted eggplants, other common additions include yogurt and meat.

Fatit 'ajir is a fatteh popular in southern Gaza, roasted unripe watermelon with unleavened bread and chopped vegetables. A similar dish can be found in the northern parts of the Sinai Peninsula, Egypt.

==== Lebanon ====
Lebanese fatteh traditionally includes chicken and yogurt, with regional varieties within Lebanon itself.

==== Syria ====
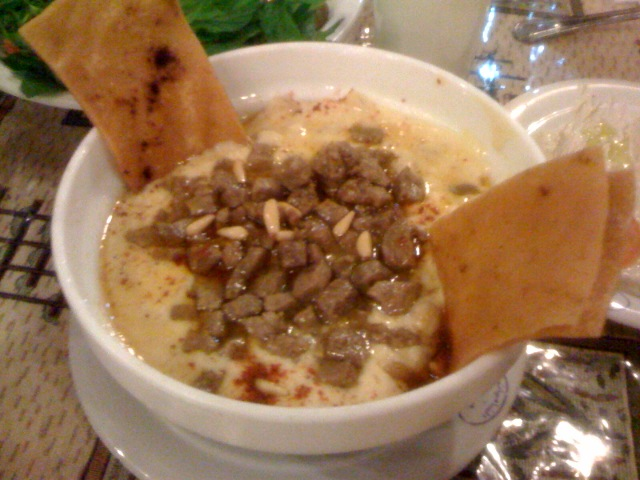
Syrian fetté with grilled lamb cubes and pine nuts, served with sizzling butter

The Levantine "fetté", eaten in breakfasts as well as in the evenings, always starts with a stack of khubz bread, topped by strained yogurt, steamed chickpeas and olive oil that are crushed and mixed together. In the next step, a teaspoon of cumin is almost always poured into the mixture. After that, virtually anything can be added to the bowl. Some fettés are made of eggplants and julienned carrots topped with grilled chicken and pine nuts while some contain lamb shanks, different spices and yogurt. The fattoush is a salad made with toasted pieces of pita bread that technically also falls into the family of "shâmiyât".

There is Fatteh with oil, fatteh with ghee, fatteh with yogurt, and other types of fatteh that are famous in different regions of Syria. Fatteh with oil is prepared by cutting toasted or dried bread and placing it in a deep glass bowl. Fattet makdous is a fatteh made with makdous (pickled stuffed eggplants) that is popular in Aleppo and Damascus.

==== Palestine ====
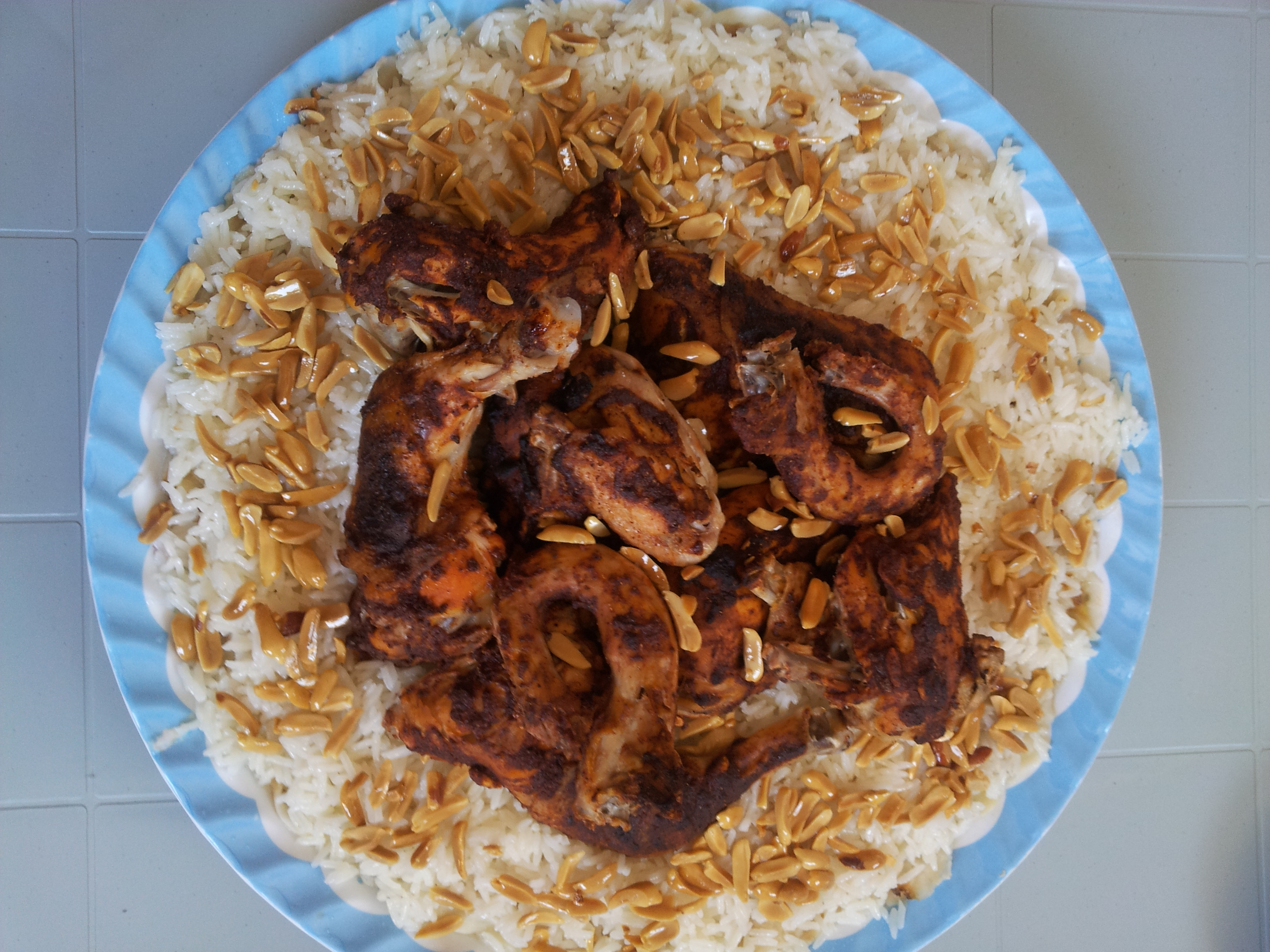
Fetté gazzewié, made with saj bread soaked with chicken broth and rice

"Fetté gazzewié" from Gaza is served as plain rice cooked in meat or chicken broth and then flavored with mild spices, particularly cinnamon. The rice is then laid over a thin markook bread which is in turn smothered in clarified butter and topped with various meats. Some versions of Musakhan are fetté dishes.

==== Jordan ====
Mansaf, the national dish of Jordan, can be considered a fatteh dish, it is made with rice, meat, a fermented-yoghurt called jameed, and shredded saj bread.

== Gallery ==
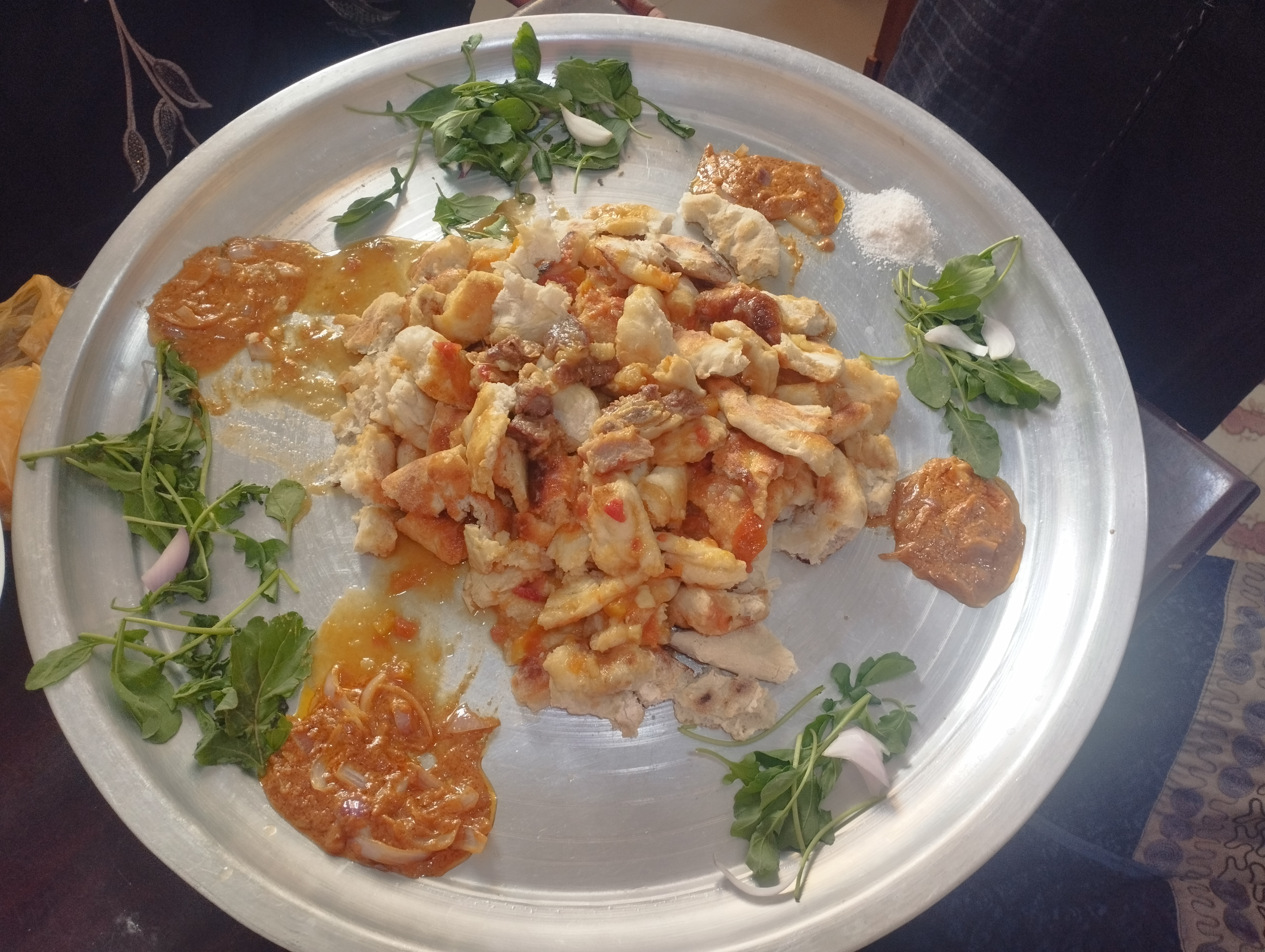
Fatteh in Sudan

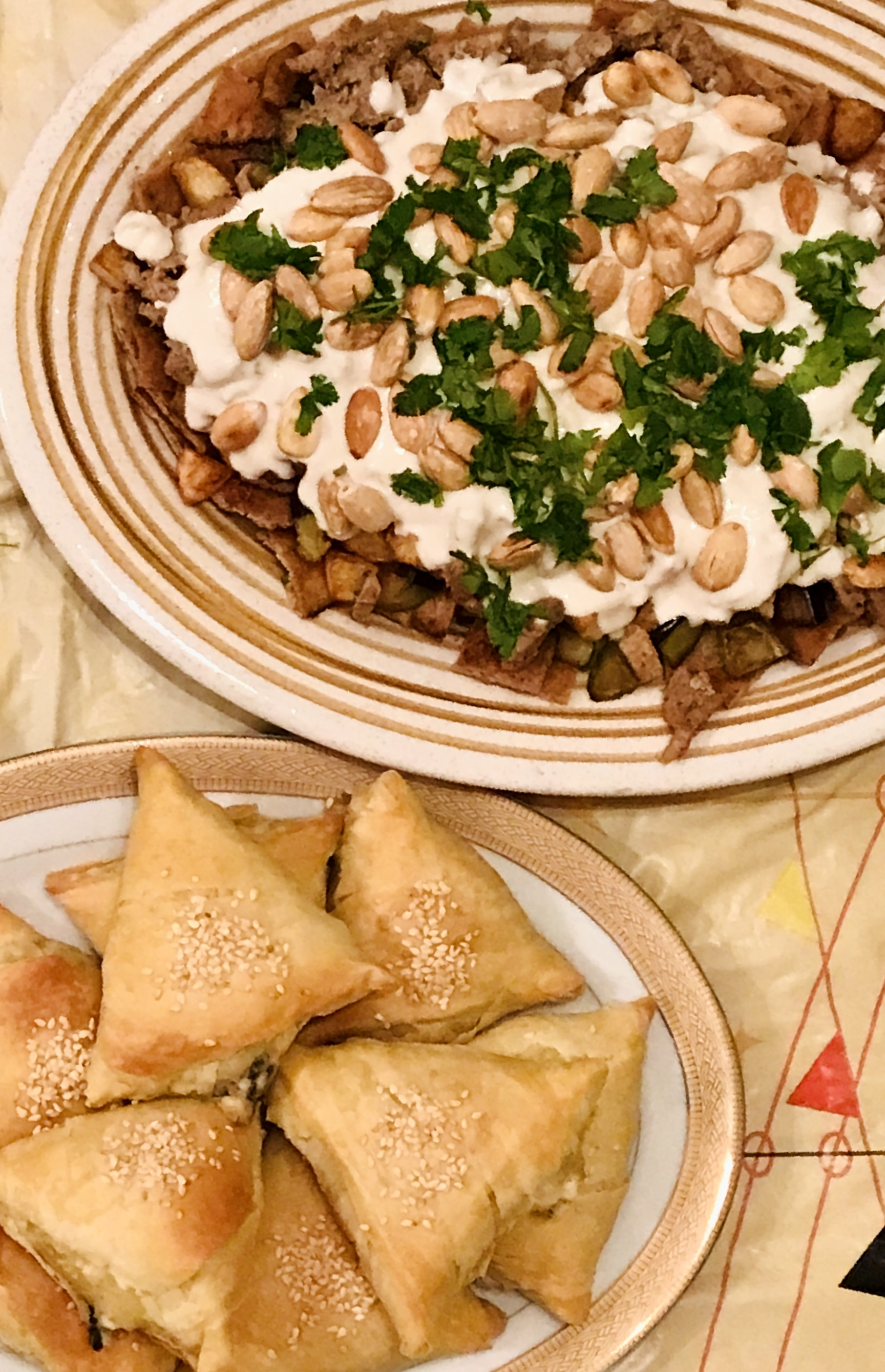
Fatteh in Libya

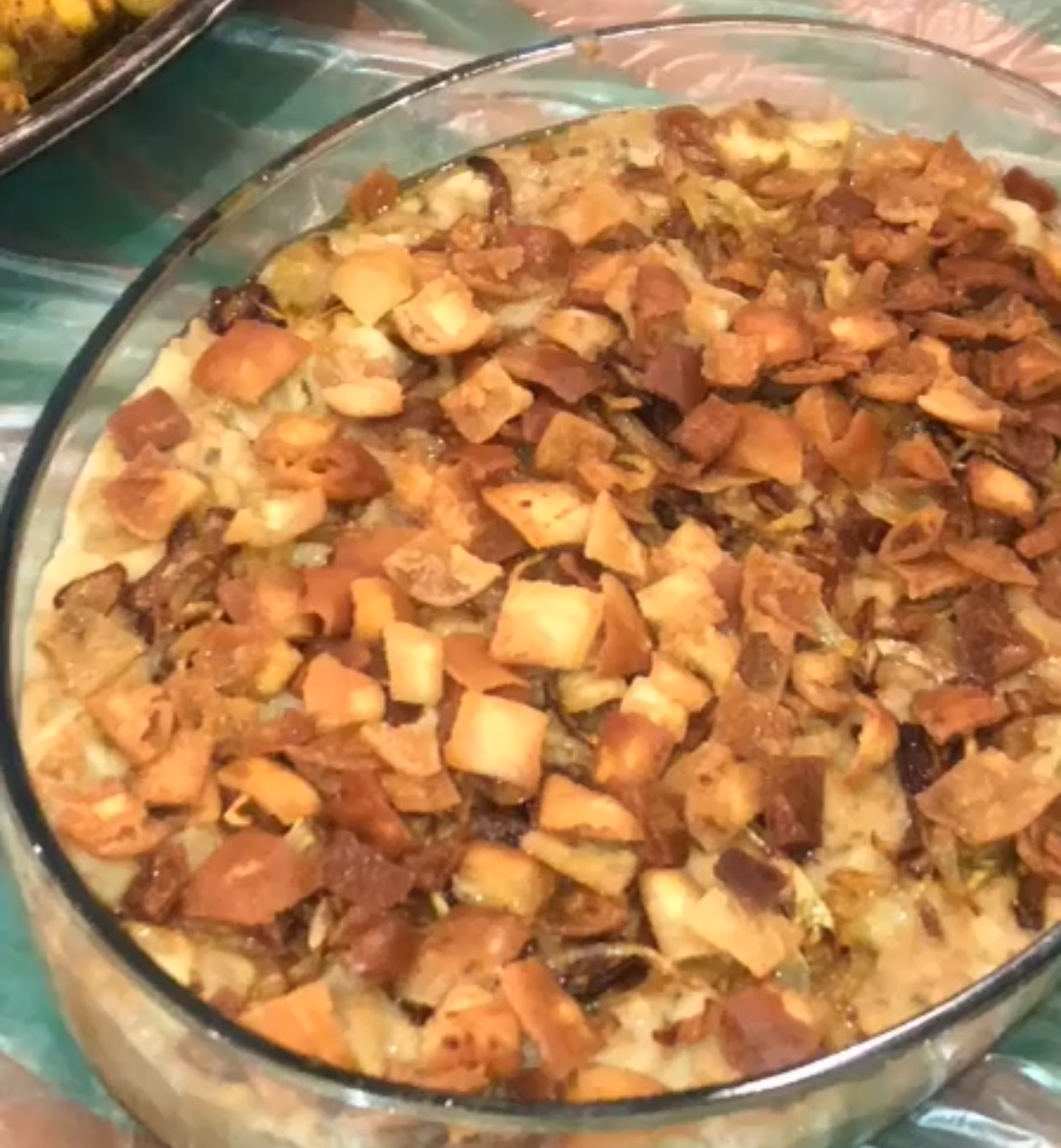
Levantine eggplant fatteh, with bread on top

== See also ==
- Arab cuisine
- Middle Eastern cuisine
- List of African dishes

== Bibliography ==
- Jennings, Anne M. (1995), The Nubians of West Aswan: Village Women in the Midst of Change, Lynne Rienner Publishers, ISBN 1-55587-592-0
- Wright, Clifford A. (2003), Little Foods of the Mediterranean: 500 Fabulous Recipes for Antipasti, Tapas, Harvard Common Press, ISBN 1-55832-227-2
- Salamandra, Christa Anne (2004), A new old Damascus: authenticity and distinction in urban Syria, Indiana University Press, ISBN 0-253-21722-9
