= Soto mi =

Indonesian noodle soup dish

Soto mie
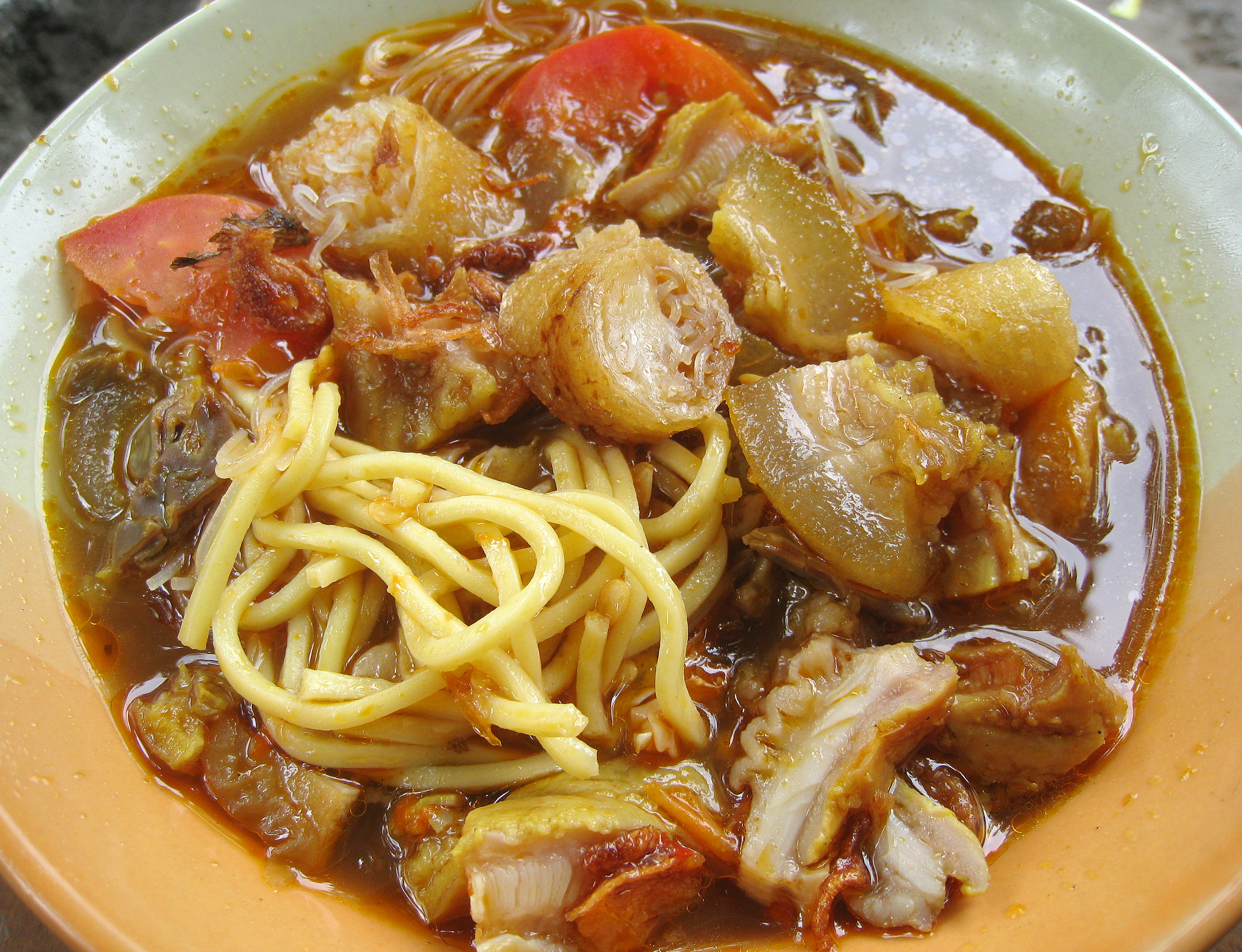
- Soto mie bogor style, noodle and rice vermicelli, cabbage, tomato, (cartilage and tendons of cow's trotters) and tripes, risoles spring rolls, served in broth soup, added sweet soy sauce, sprinkled with fried shallots and sambal chilli
- Alternative names: Soto mi, Mee soto
- Course: Main course
- Place of origin: Indonesia
- Region or state: Nationwide in Indonesia, also popular in Maritime Southeast Asia
- Associated cuisine: Indonesia, Singapore, Malaysia
- Serving temperature: Hot
- Main ingredients: Chicken, or beef soups with noodle
- Food energy (per serving): 433 kcal (1,810 kJ)

Soto mie, Soto mi, or Mee soto is a spicy Indonesian noodle soup dish commonly found in Indonesia, Malaysia, and Singapore. Mie means noodle made of flour, salt and egg, while soto refers to Indonesian soup. In Indonesia, it is called soto mie and is considered one variant of soto, while in Malaysia and Singapore it is called mee soto.

== Ingredients ==
Soto mie can be made of beef, chicken, or offals such as kaki sapi (skin, cartilage and tendons of cow's trotters) or tripes. People may exchange noodles for rice or rice vermicelli according to their preference. A combination of either noodle or rice vermicelli along with slices of tomato, boiled potato, hard-boiled egg, cabbages, peanut, bean sprout and beef, offal or chicken meat are added. Broth is then poured over this combination. This soup is made from beef or chicken stock and some other spices. Condiments are usually added, such as jeruk nipis (lime juice), sambal, bawang goreng (fried shallot), vinegar, kecap manis (sweet soy sauce), and emping.

== Variants ==
Yellow noodles served in soto soup is mainly known in two major different versions; the beef (soto mie) and chicken (mee soto) versions.

=== Soto mie (Bogor and Jakarta) ===
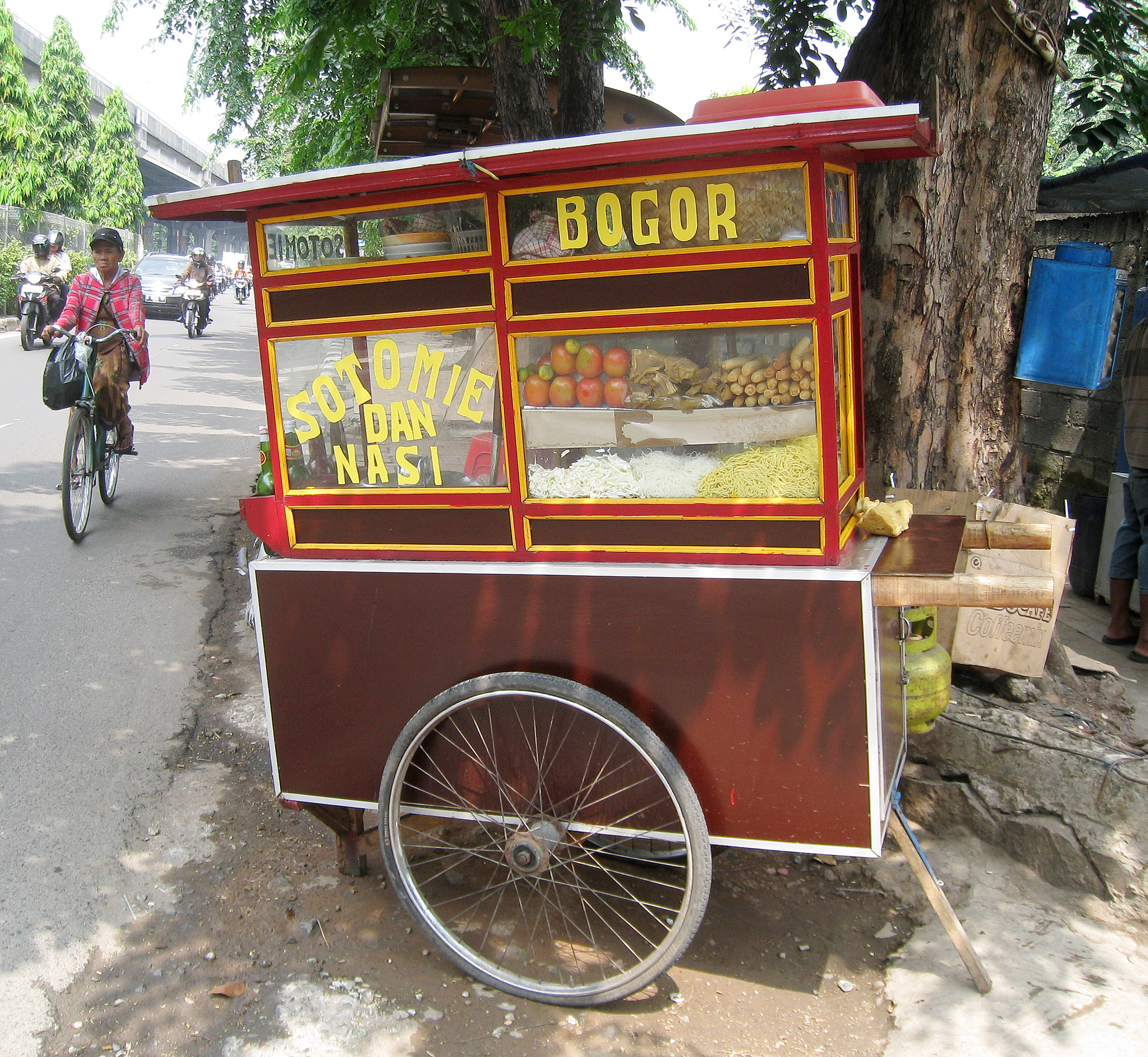
A travelling Soto mie bogor cart on Jakarta street, with the ingredients displayed on the window

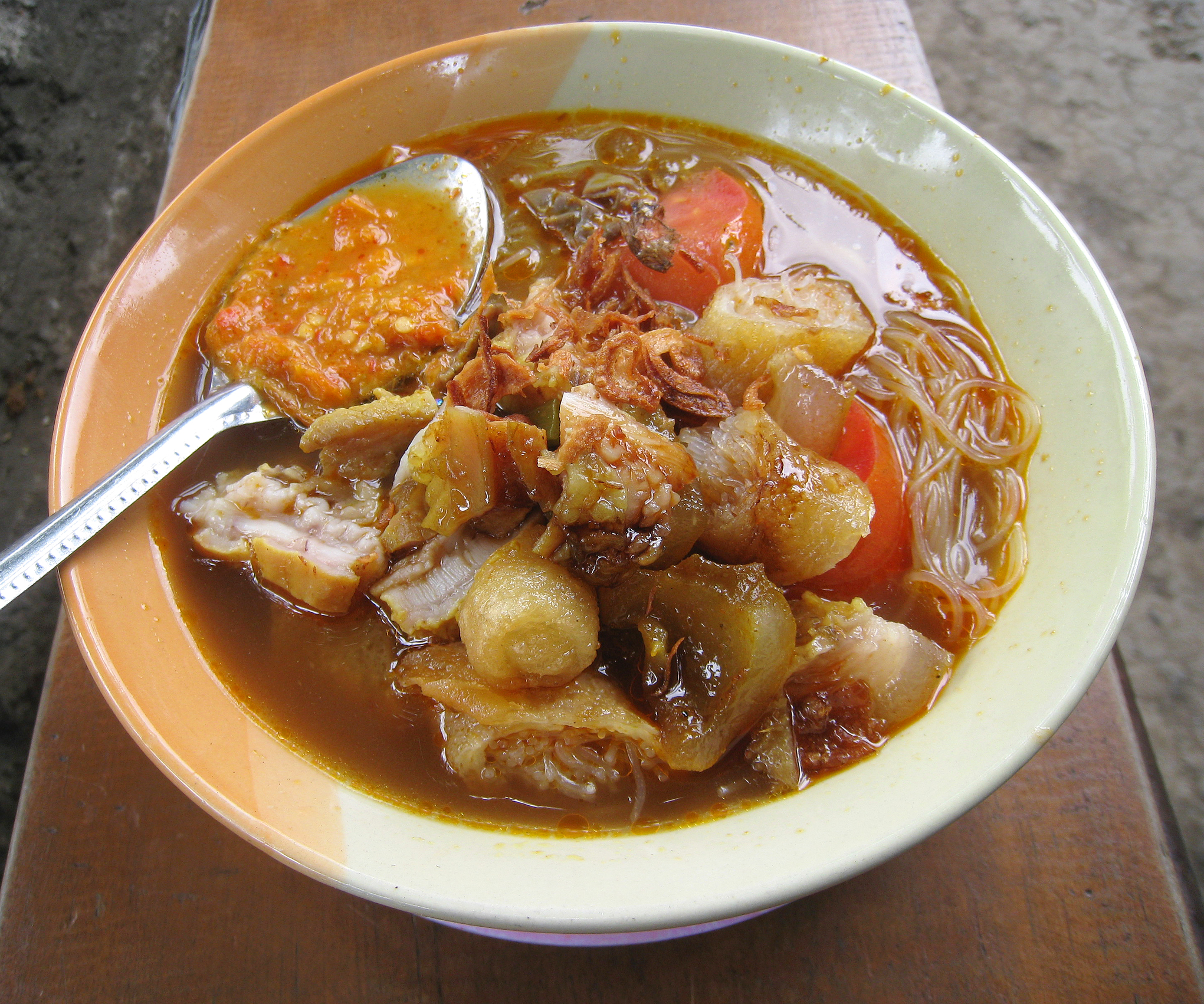
Soto mie bogor sold on Jakarta street

The most popular soto mie in Indonesia comes from Bogor, West Java. It is a popular street food sold by travelling gerobak or cart vendors frequenting business and residential areas in cities and towns in Indonesia. The beef broth soup is spiced with shallot, garlic, candlenut, peppercorn, ground ebi (dried shrimp), daun salam (Indonesian bayleaf), lime leaves, bruised lemongrass and lime juice. It is made of beef or cow's trotters (tendons, skin and cartilage) with noodles, slices of risole (fried spring rolls with bihun and vegetables filling similar to lumpia), tomato, cabbage, potato, and celery. The Jakarta (Betawi) version is very similar to the version found in Bogor, but beef meat is preferred over cow's trotters, and galangal is added in its spice mixture.

=== Mee soto (Singapore and Johor) ===
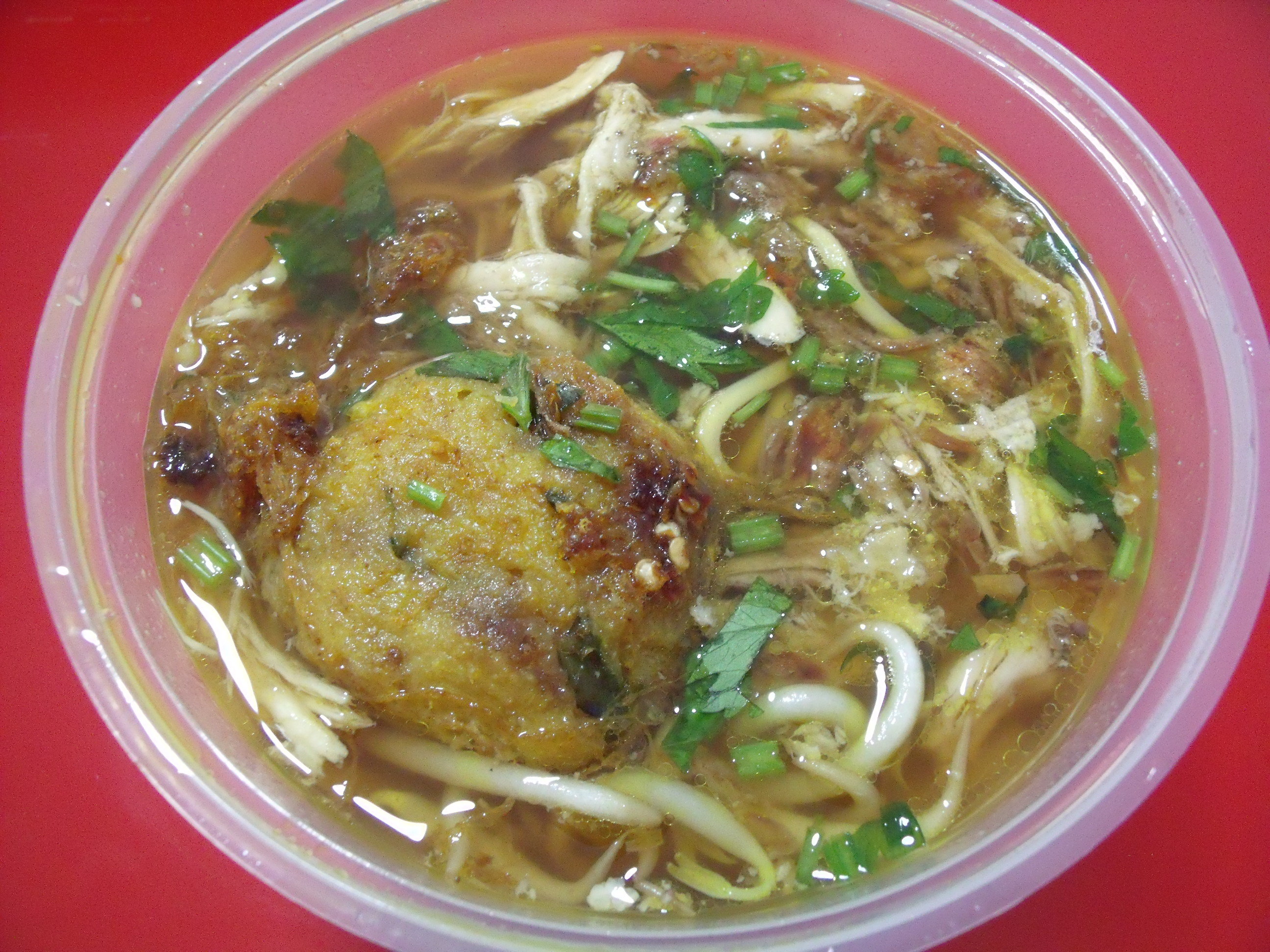
Mee soto sold in Bukit Batok, Singapore, which is Indonesian-derived chicken soto served with noodles

In Singapore and Johor, Malaysia, the most popular variant is mee soto ayam (chicken noodle soto). Mee soto is a spicy noodle soup dish that combines the Indonesian chicken broth known as soto ayam with thick yellow Hokkien noodles. The chicken broth is spiced with spice paste made of ground peppercorns, coriander, garlic, candlenut, galangal, red onion, turmeric, bruised lemongrass, cardamom, cloves and cinnamon.

Mee soto is a Javanese influenced dish, and quite popular in Singapore and Johor. It is similar to soto ayam (chicken soto) commonly served in Indonesia, with exception that it is served with noodles instead of rice vermicelli. The origin of the soto ayam broth used for making mee soto can be traced to the Madurese migrant ethnic group residing in the Indonesian city of Surabaya in East Java. The East Javanese immigrants from Madura and Lamongan settled in Johor and Singapore, bringing with them the spicy soto ayam broth dish, and replacing the rice dumplings (lontong) with yellow noodles.

== See also ==
- Soto ayam
- Mie rebus
- Laksa
- List of Indonesian soups
