= Sheep's trotter =

Culinary term for sheep's feet

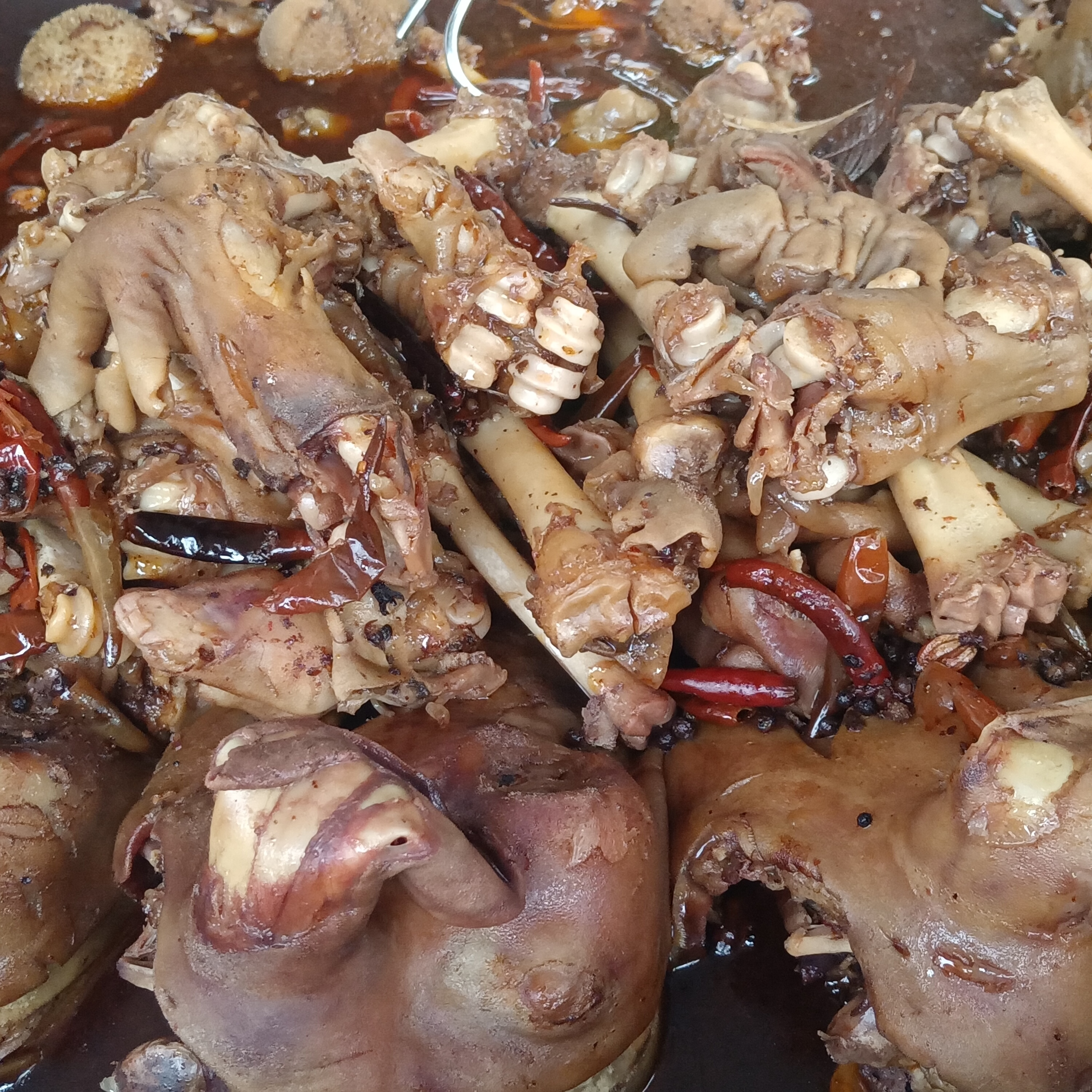
Braised mutton trotters from Mongolian cuisine

A sheep's trotter, also referred to as a lamb's trotter, is the culinary term for the foot of sheep. They may be cooked by being boiled, broiled or fried, and are used in various dishes. Sheep's trotters may also be parboiled and then finished by an additional cooking method, such as stewing. They can be served with sauces such as white sauce or a brown gravy.

Powsowdie is a Scottish broth or soup made from sheep's heid ('head'), that sometimes includes sheep's trotters as an ingredient. Sheep's trotters are used in the preparation of lamb's trotters soup, which can also include leg meat. Harqma is soup that is common in the Maghreb area of Northern Africa, and is sometimes prepared using lamb's trotters. They are also slow-cooked to make paya, which is popular in South Asian cuisine. It is popular amongst South Africans, adapted from the cuisine of India. Those of south Asian descent, and other South Africans often cook it with spices and sugar beans (pinto) or crab-eye beans (borlotti beans). In Sardinia, pedi d'agnoni (Sassarese) or piedini d'agnello (Italian) are a traditional dish in the town of Sassari, mostly served for Christmas.

== See also ==
- Chicken feet
- Cow's trotters
- Khash (dish)
- List of lamb dishes
- Pig's trotters
