= Kawareʻ =

Egyptian dish made of slow-cooked cow's trotters

Kawareʻ كوارع
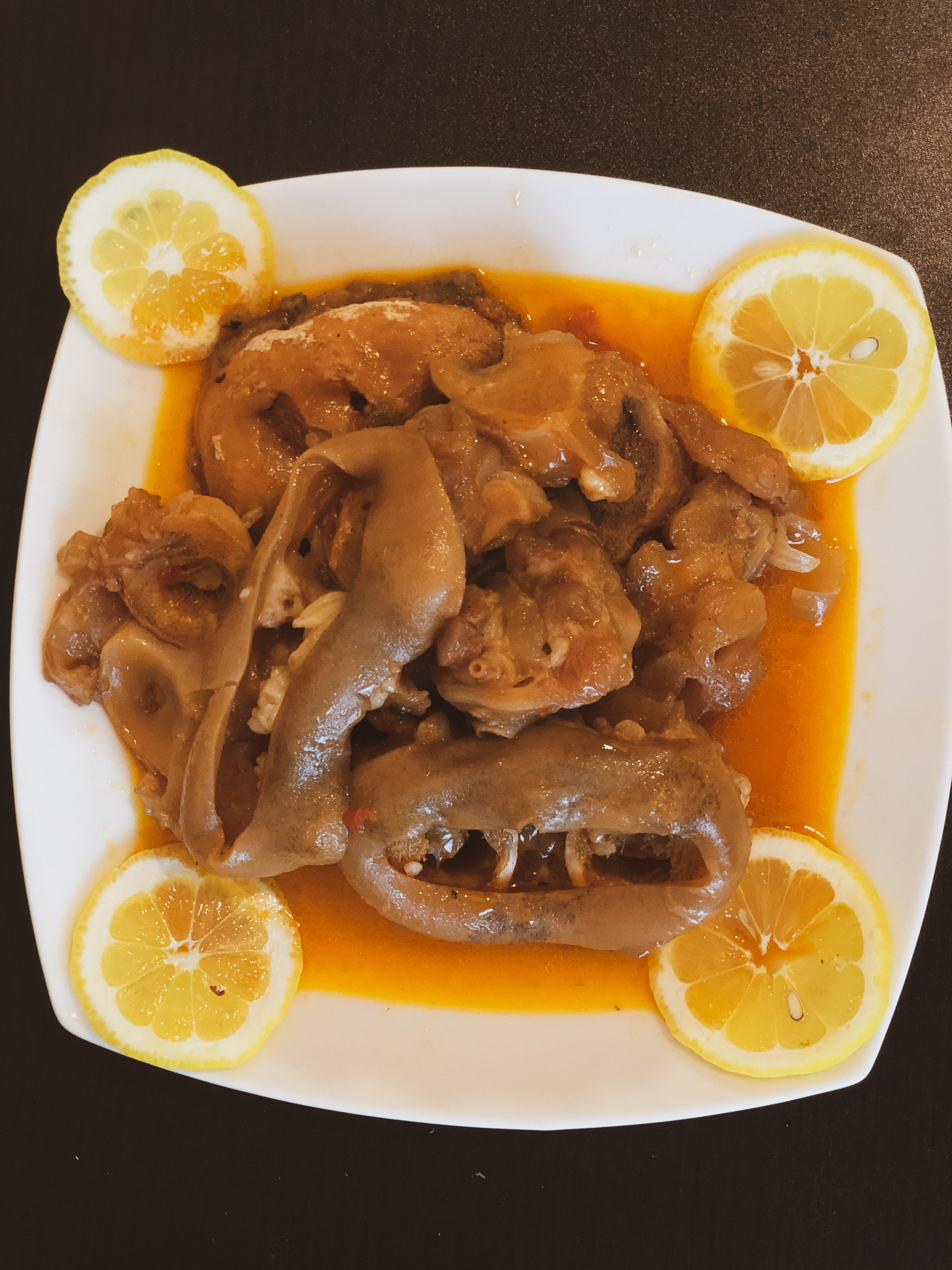
- Place of origin: Egypt
- Main ingredients: Cow trotters

Kawareʻ (Arabic: كوارع) is an Egyptian dish made from slow-cooked cow trotters, resulting in a rich and gelatinous soup. It is a delicacy cherished for its deep flavors and is often enjoyed during festive occasions, either as a soup or the trotters can be removed from the broth and served with fatta.

== Preparation ==
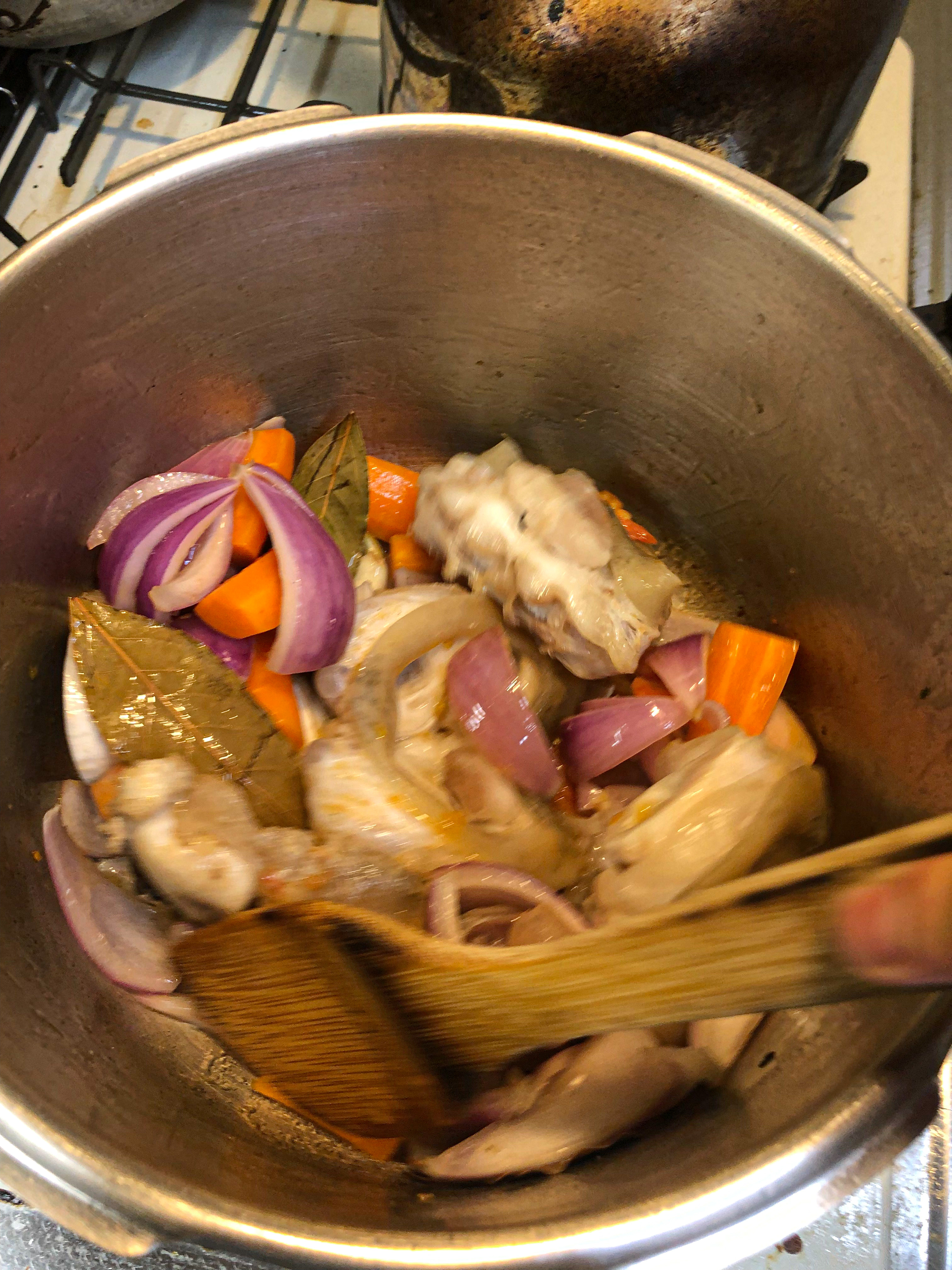
Preparation of kawareʻ

The preparation of kawareʻ begins with thoroughly cleaning the trotters to remove any impurities. They are then boiled in water with aromatics such as onions, bay leaves, cardamom, cloves, and black peppercorns to infuse the broth with robust flavors. The cooking process is slow and can take several hours, allowing the collagen in the trotters to break down and create a rich, gelatinous texture in the soup. Once the trotters are tender, the soup is typically seasoned with salt and may be finished with a squeeze of lemon juice to brighten the flavors. Kawareʻ is commonly served hot, accompanied by fatta or just eish baladi, making for a nourishing and satisfying meal.

In Egyptian culture, kawareʻ is considered a highly nutritious dish, believed to provide health benefits such as strengthening the joints due to its high gelatin content. It is especially popular during the winter months, offering warmth and sustenance.

The dish holds a special place in Egyptian cuisine, often associated with family gatherings and festive occasions. Its rich flavor and cultural significance make it a beloved meal among Egyptians.

== See also ==
- Egyptian cuisine
- List of Middle Eastern dishes
- List of African dishes
