= Cow's trotter =

Culinary term for cow's feet

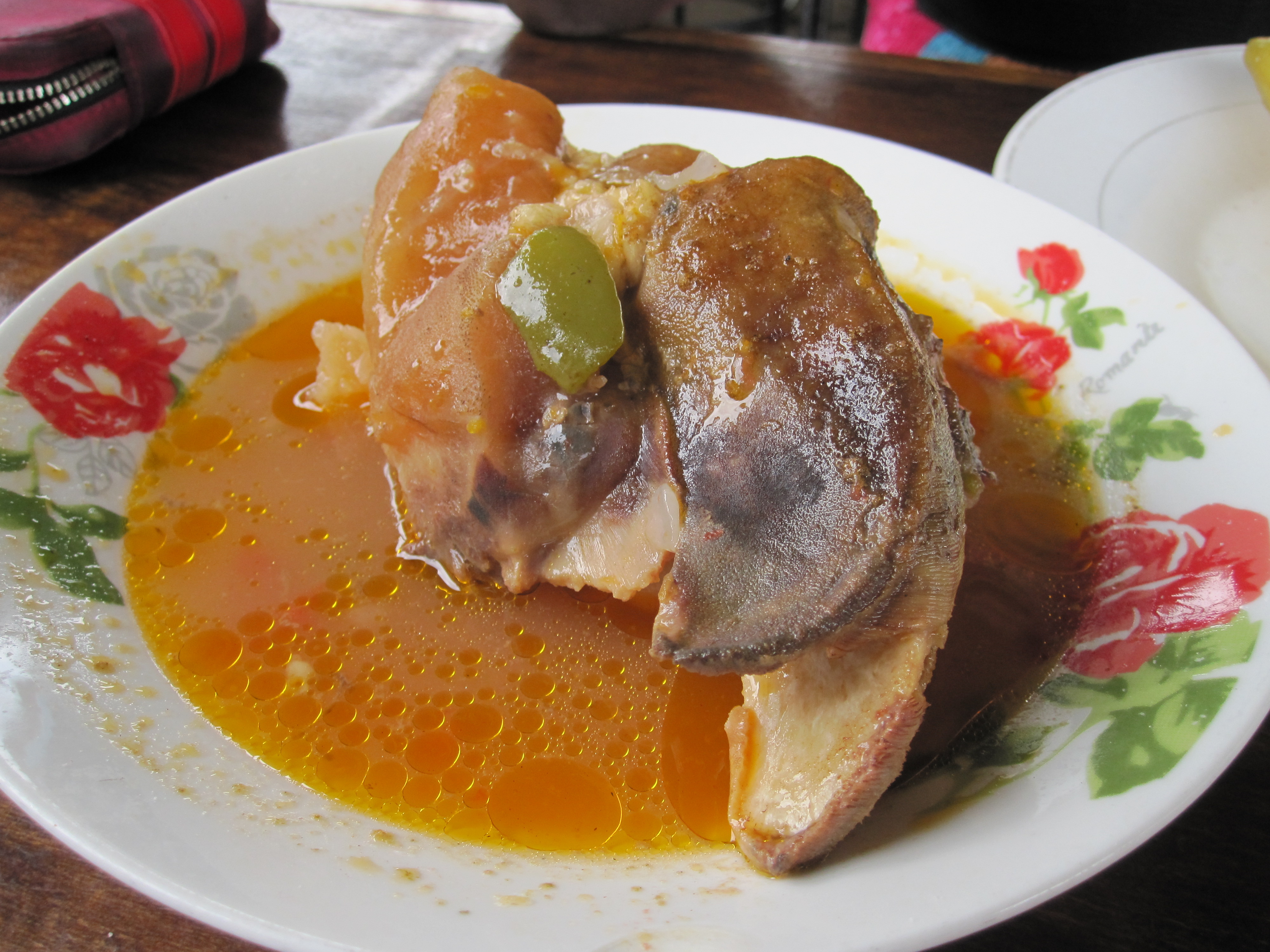
Cooked cow's hoof or cow's trotters, a delicacy in Uganda.

A cow's trotter is the culinary term for the foot of cattle. The cuts are used in various dishes around the world, especially in Asian, African, French, and the Caribbean cuisine. Latin American cuisine also uses cow's trotters for several traditional dishes.

Other than cattle, the trotters of other ungulates such as goat, sheep and pig might also be consumed and used in certain dish of some cuisines' tradition.

== Description ==
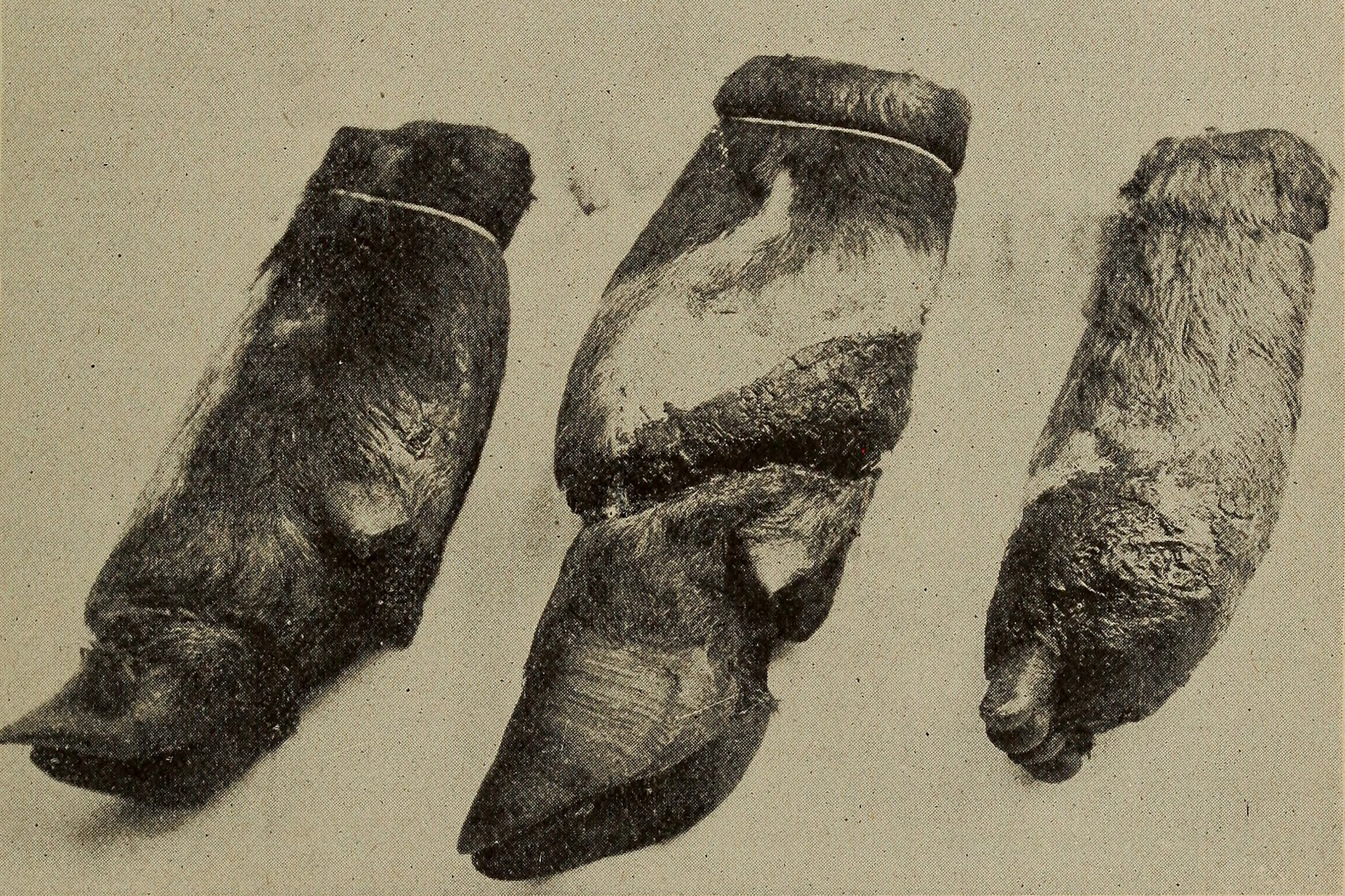
Cattle hoof and feet (trotters).

Cow's trotters do not contain any muscles or meat; other than bones and toe hoof, it mainly consists of skin, tendons and cartilage. In cuisine, the trotters' cuts are mainly valued for its unique texture—a gelatinous rather chewy soft texture of its tendons and skin, and also a rich broth produced from its bones. Nevertheless, to acquire a pleasant soft texture, a prolonged time of cooking, or pressure cooker might be employed in the process, this will extract the gelatins out of the trotters into the soup. In the early 20th century, food writers like Agnes Jekyll would recommend enriching braised-lamb gravy with "two calves' feet, well scalded and cleaned and cut up."

The trotters are not commonly consumed as part of 21st-century Western cuisine, and not included in common cut of beef, which only recognize shanks. Nevertheless, the cut is often included as part of beef shank.

In Indonesian cuisine, cow's trotters is considered as a delicacy. The gulai tunjang or gulai kaki sapi is a popular spicy cow's trotter curry in Padang cuisine. While soto kaki sapi is a type of traditional spicy Soto soup made of bits of tendons, cartilage and skin from cow's trotters. The soup is popular in Indonesia, especially in Betawi cuisine.

== Dishes ==
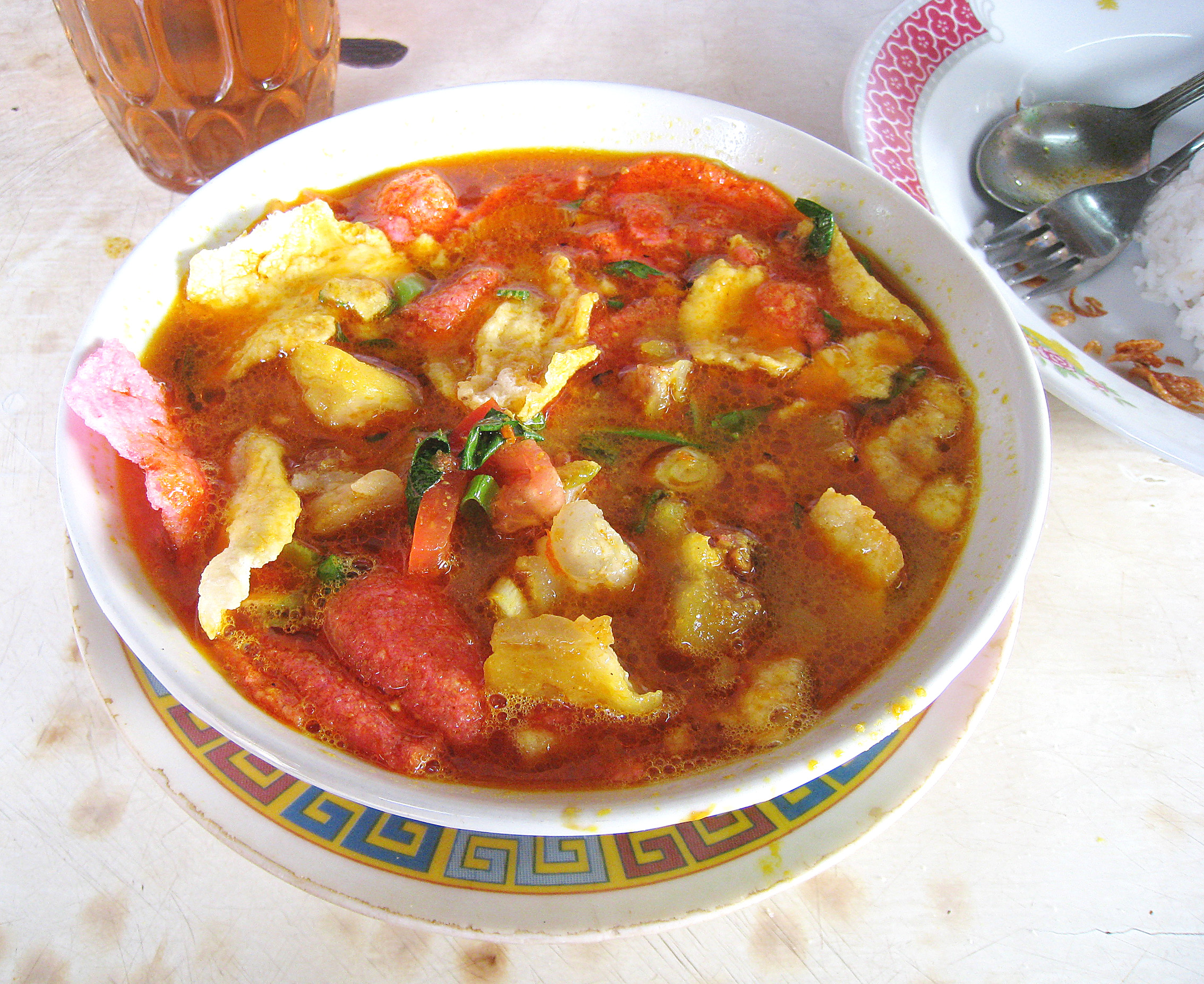
Soto kaki Betawi, Jakartan cow's trotters soup

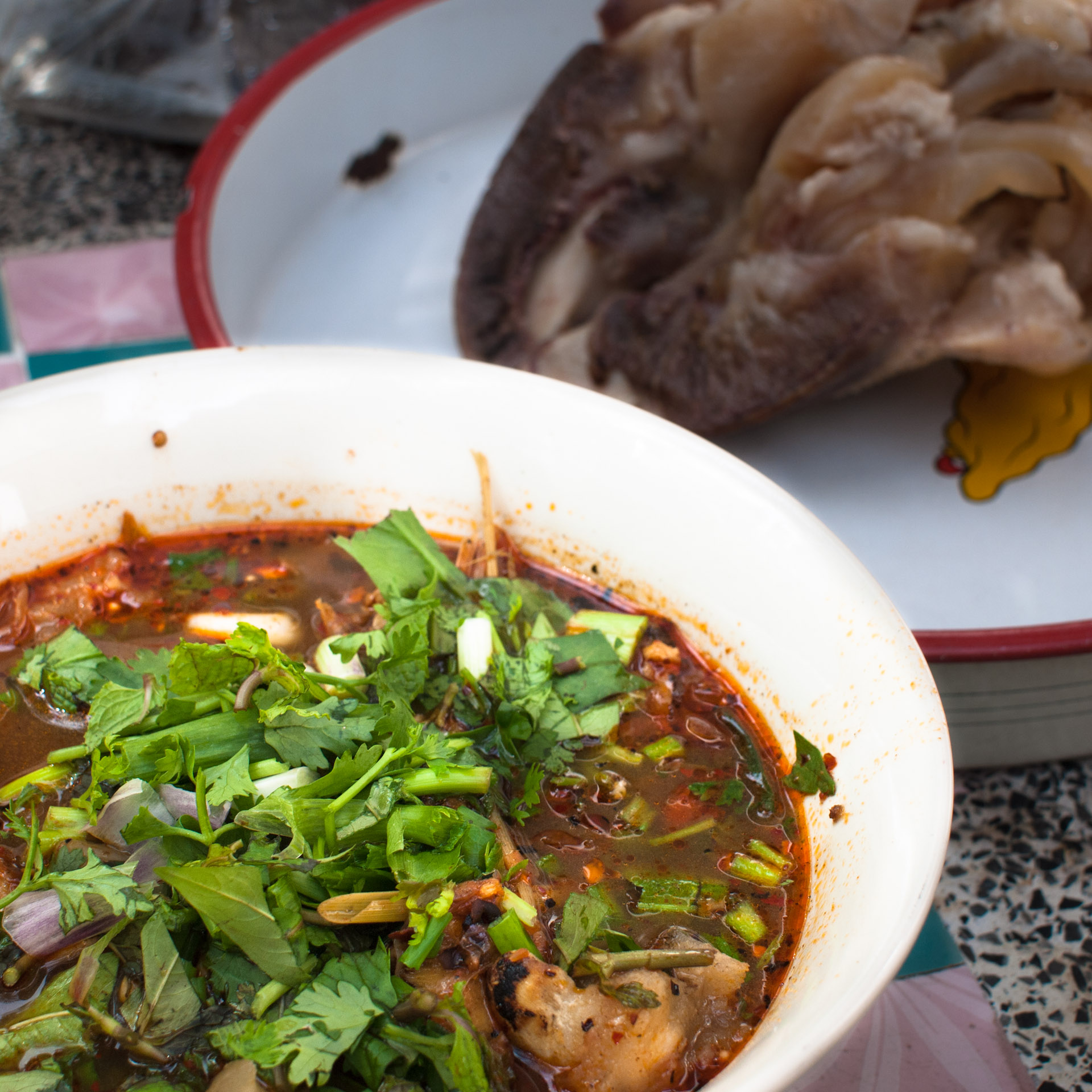
Thai Yam tin khwai.

- Caldo de Mocotó, a Brazilian cow's trotters soup, popular in Northeast Region
- Cow foot stew in Jamaica and Belize
- El Hergma/Hargma (الهركمة) or El-Ker'ine/Ker3ine (الكرعين) in the Maghreb countries(Tunisia,Algeria,Morocco). A traditional dish of cow's, calves' or lamb's trotters/feet with a base of chickpeas and a spicy (watery) sauce.
- Gulai tunjang, spicy cow's trotters curry in Minangkabau cuisine in Indonesia
- Kare-kare in the Philippines can use cow's trotters
- Kaware‘ (كوارع) in Egypt
- Khash in Armenia, Azerbaijan and Iran, also known as pacha in Iraq and Turkey
- Makongoro in Tanzania
- Mangqina/Mazondo in Zimbabwe
- Mão de vaca, in the traditional cuisine of Cabo Verde, is a cow trotter soup made using pureed chickpeas.
- Mie kocok, an Indonesian beef noodle soup, which contains rich beef consommé soup, beef tendon or slices of cow's trotters, bean sprouts and meatball.
- Nkwobi in Nigeria
- Paya in Pakistan
- Sagol in Korean cuisine
- Soto mie Bogor noodle soup uses slices of cow's trotters from Indonesia.
- Soto kaki sapi, spicy cow's trotters soup in Indonesian cuisine
- Thlakwana in South Africa.
- Yam tin khwai in Thai cuisine, a spicy and sour Northern Thai soup made with the hoof of a water buffalo.

== See also ==
- Chicken feet
- Claws
- Offal
- Pig's trotters
- Sheep's trotters
- Calf's heel jelly
