= Babbouche =

Moroccan dish

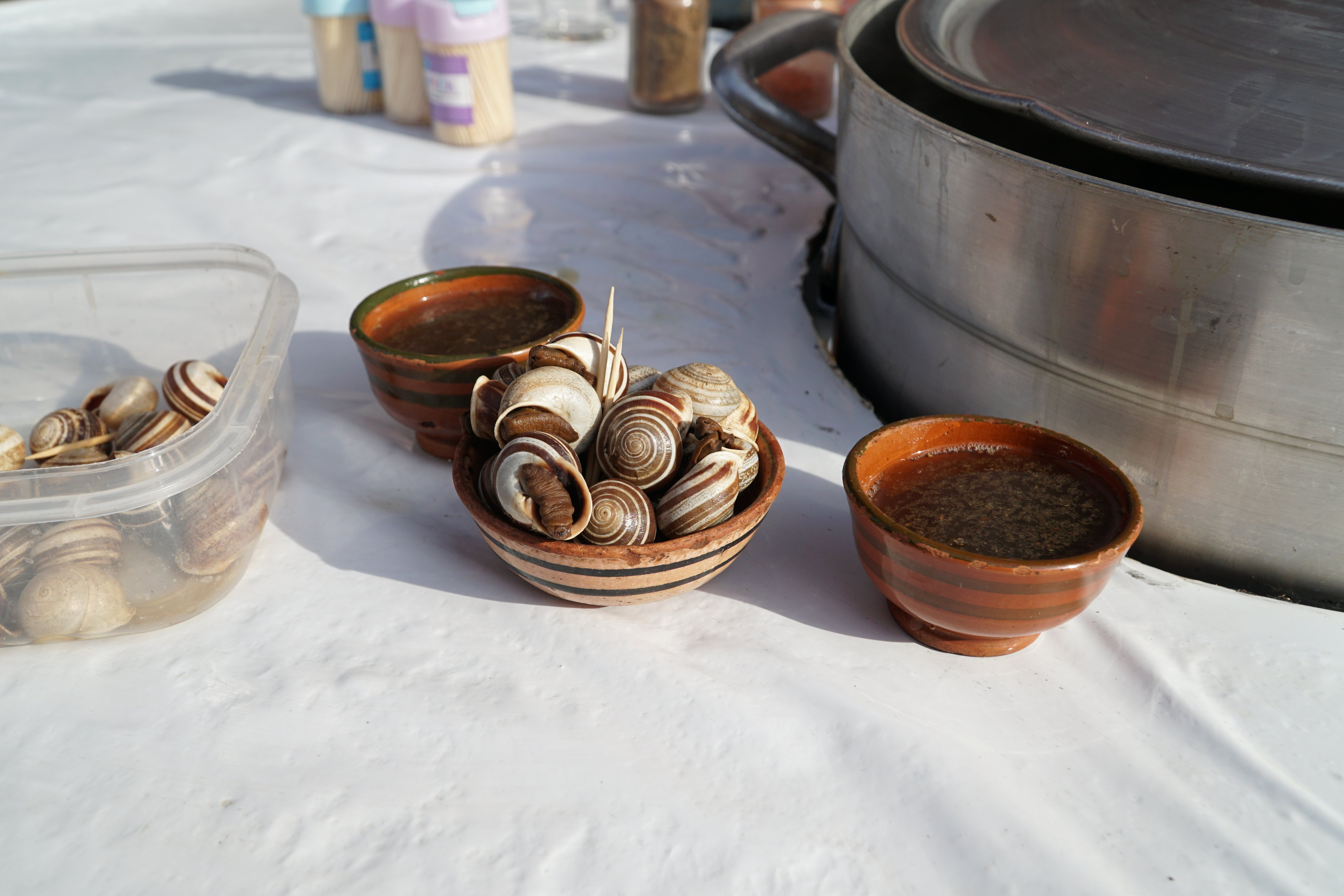
Babbouche in Marrakesh

Babbouche is a dish originating in Morocco whose main ingredient is snails. The snails are cooked slowly in broth that contains ingredients such as thyme, aniseed, gum arabic, mint, caraway and liquorice.

The dish is sometimes prepared and served as a soup.
