= Pig's trotter =

Culinary term for pig's feet

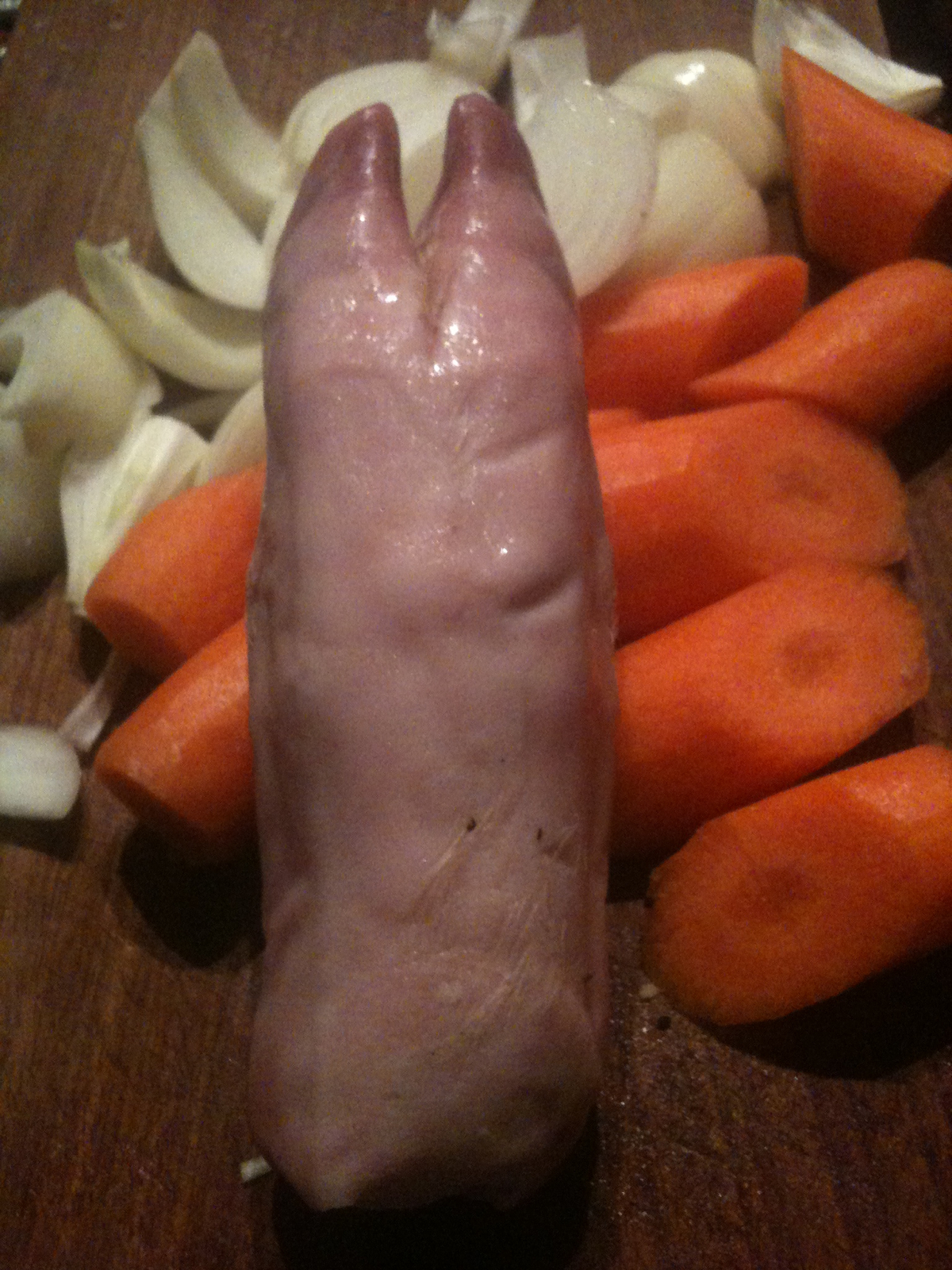
A raw pig's trotter with carrots and onions

A pig's trotter (a.k.a. pettitoe or simply pig's foot) is the culinary term for the artiodactyl hoof of a pig. Typically an offcut of pork, pig's trotters feature in various dishes around the world, and experienced a resurgence in the late 2000s.

== Description ==
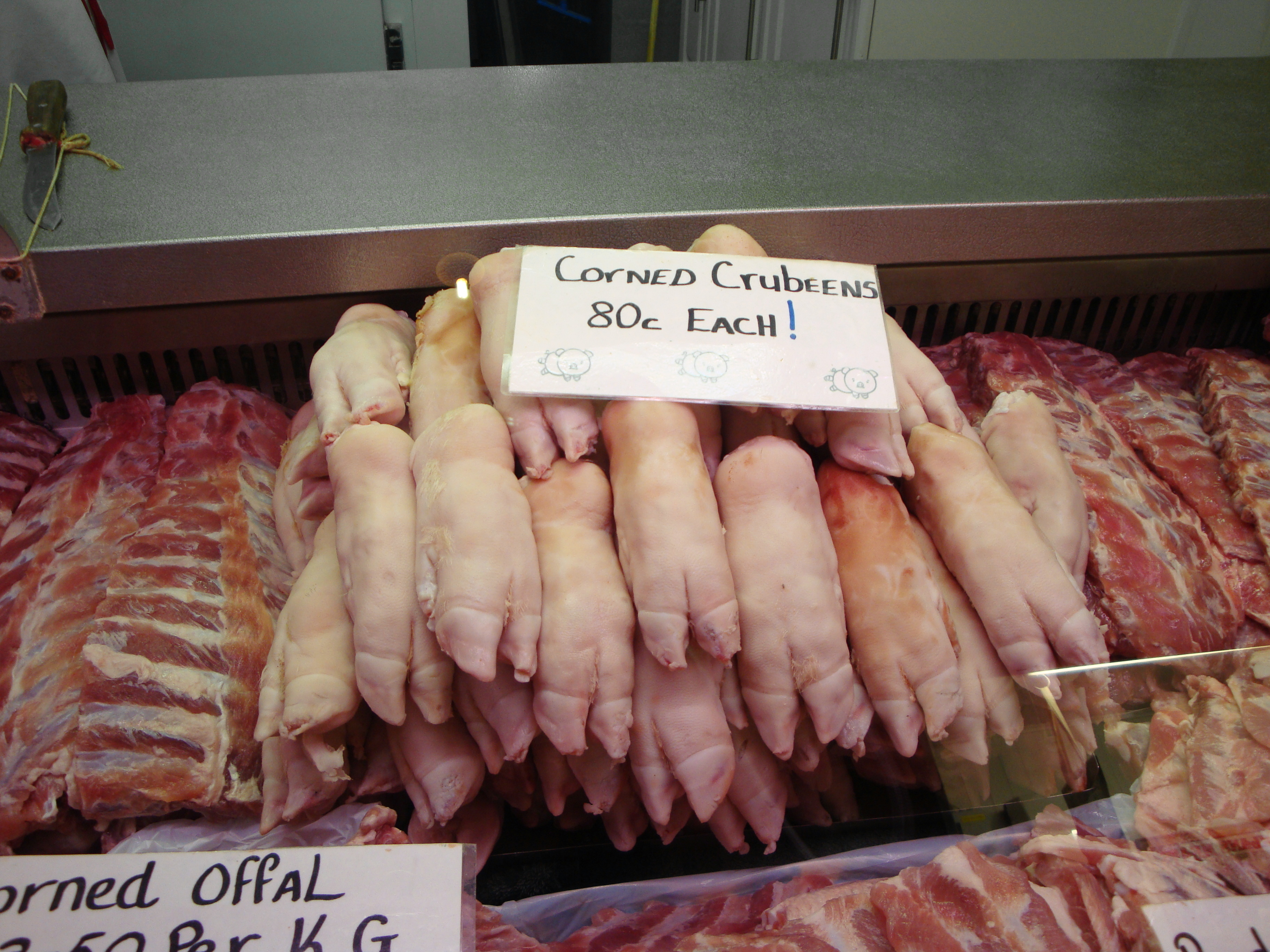
Crubeens, corned pigs' trotters in Irish cuisine

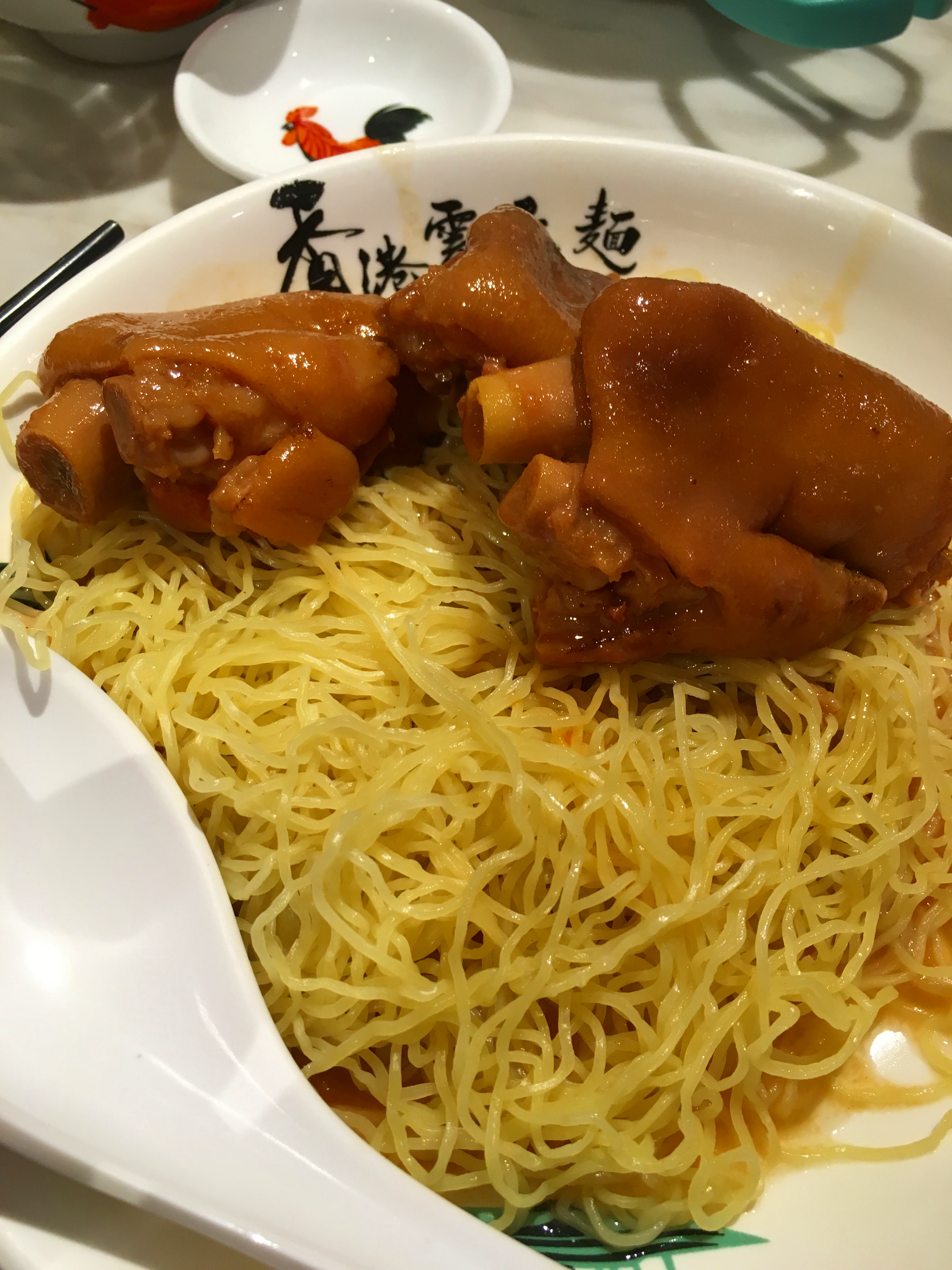
noodles with pigs' trotters braised with nam yu (fermented bean curd)

Before sale, the trotters are cleaned and typically have the hairs pulled with a hot tank and beaters. They are often used in cooking to make stocks, as they add thickness to gravy, although they are also served as a normal cut of meat. In Puerto Rico, a tomato-based stew of pigs' trotters with chickpeas is called patitas de cerdo. Sometimes potatoes or butternut are added. British chef Marco Pierre White has long served trotters at his restaurants, based on the original recipe of mentor Pierre Koffmann.

Following the Great Recession, there was a boom in popularity of pigs' trotters in the United Kingdom as a revival in cheap meat recipes occurred. In 2008, British supermarket Waitrose reintroduced trotters to its stores, and found that they quickly became popular.

In Norwegian tradition, pigs' feet are salted and boiled and served as syltelabb. This is a pre-Christmas dish because the pig was slaughtered before Christmas, and everything was used. Today syltelabb is for enthusiasts.

The thick skin and abundant connective tissue of pigs' feet makes them a good source of dietary collagen.

== Recipes and combinations ==
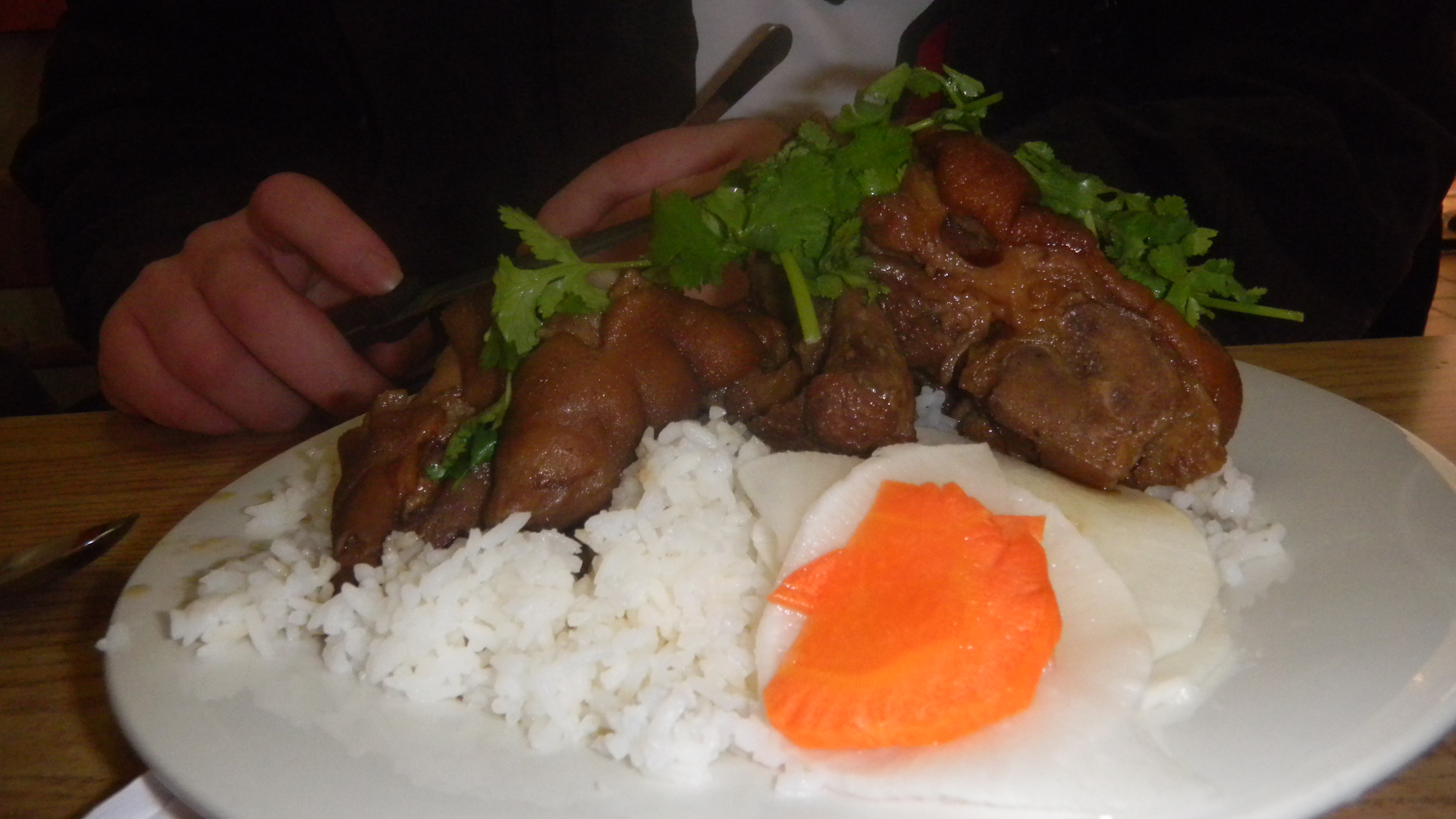
Pigs' trotters on rice

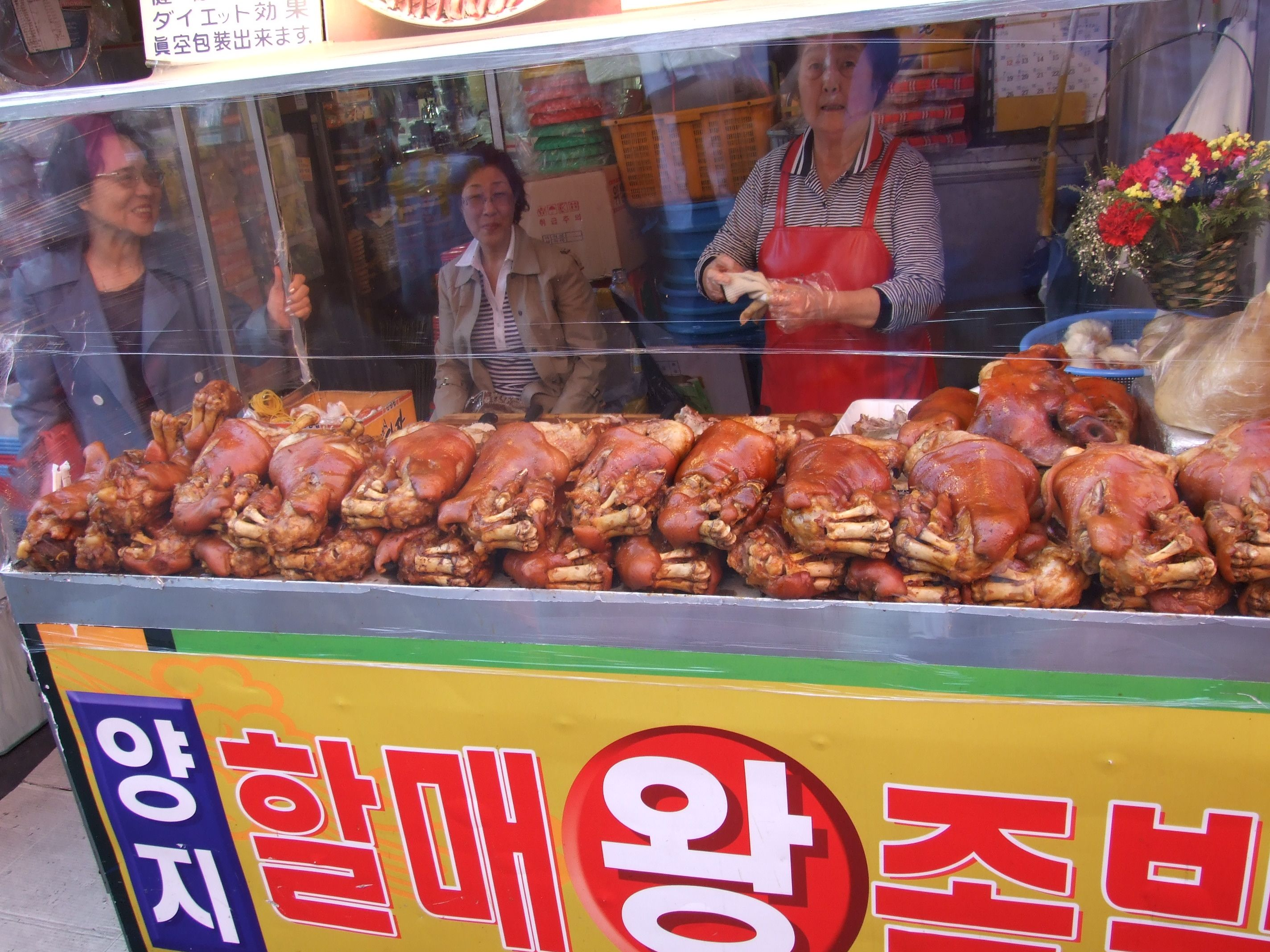
Korean jokbal sold at Namdaemun Market

- Bean crock (les pais au fou) in Jersey, Channel Islands
- Batsoà from the Piedmont region of Italy
- Cappello da prete in Modena, Italy
- Chispalhada in Portugal: trotter with chickpeas or beans
- Cotechino in Modena, Italy
- Zampone in Modena, Italy
- Körömpörkölt in Hungary
- Crubeens in Ireland
- Pied de cochon in Sainte-Menehould, France
- Tebichi in Okinawa, Japan
- Tom tin moo in Laos
- Crispy pata, Paksiw na pata, and patatim in the Philippines
- Manitas de cerdo in Spain
- Jokbal in Korea
- Patitas de cerdo en escabeche and manitas de cerdo en salsa verde o salsa roja in Mexico
- Souse in Barbados and St. Vincent and the Grenadines
- Spitzbein or Pfoten in German, known as golonka in Polish
- Syltelabb, a traditional Norwegian dish
- Inkokta grisfötter, a traditional Swedish dish similar to syltelabb
- Kha mu, literally "pigs' feet" in Thai, influenced by Chinese stewed pork
- Patitas con maní and Sarza de patitas in Peru
- Peus de porc in Catalonia
- Пача in Macedonia

== See also ==
- Cow's trotters
- Sheep's trotters
- Offal
- Pickled pigs' feet
- Pork
