= Paya (food) =

Spicy meat soup or curry

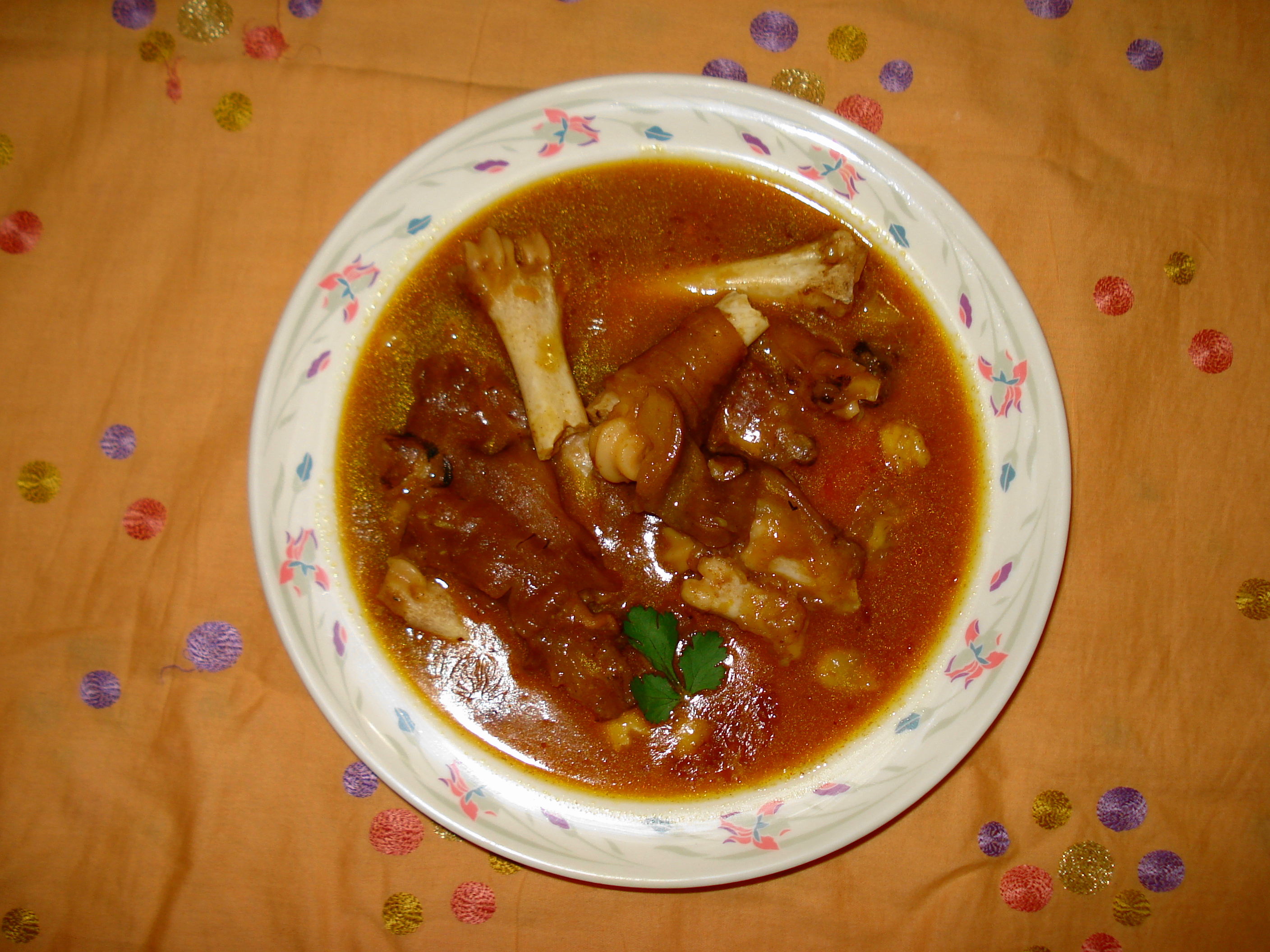
- Paya curry
- Type: Stew
- Region or state: South Asia
- Associated cuisine: Indian, Pakistani, Bangladesh
- Main ingredients: Trotters or hoof (goat, beef, buffalo, or sheep), onions, tomatoes, garlic, and other spices

Paya is a traditional stew from South Asia. It is served at various festivals and gatherings, or made for special guests. Paya means 'leg'/'feet' in the Hindi and Urdu languages. The main ingredients of the dish are the trotters (hooves) of a cow, goat, buffalo, or sheep, cooked with various spices.

== Origins ==
Paya originated from the amalgamation of South Asian and Central Asian cuisine. The dish was adapted by the cooks of Delhi, Hyderabad (Hyderabadi cuisine), and Lucknow (Awadhi cuisine). Bhopal also adopted and now specializes in this dish, with the cooks of Bhopal being famous for their way of making it.

Subsequently, paya became popular all over present-day India, Pakistan and Bangladesh. Outside of the Indian subcontinent, paya is available in restaurants that serve South Asian cuisine. In Delhi, it is sometimes also referred to as khurode from the word khur meaning foot or hoof. The Hindi word khur is derived from the Sanskrit word khura.

== Recipes ==
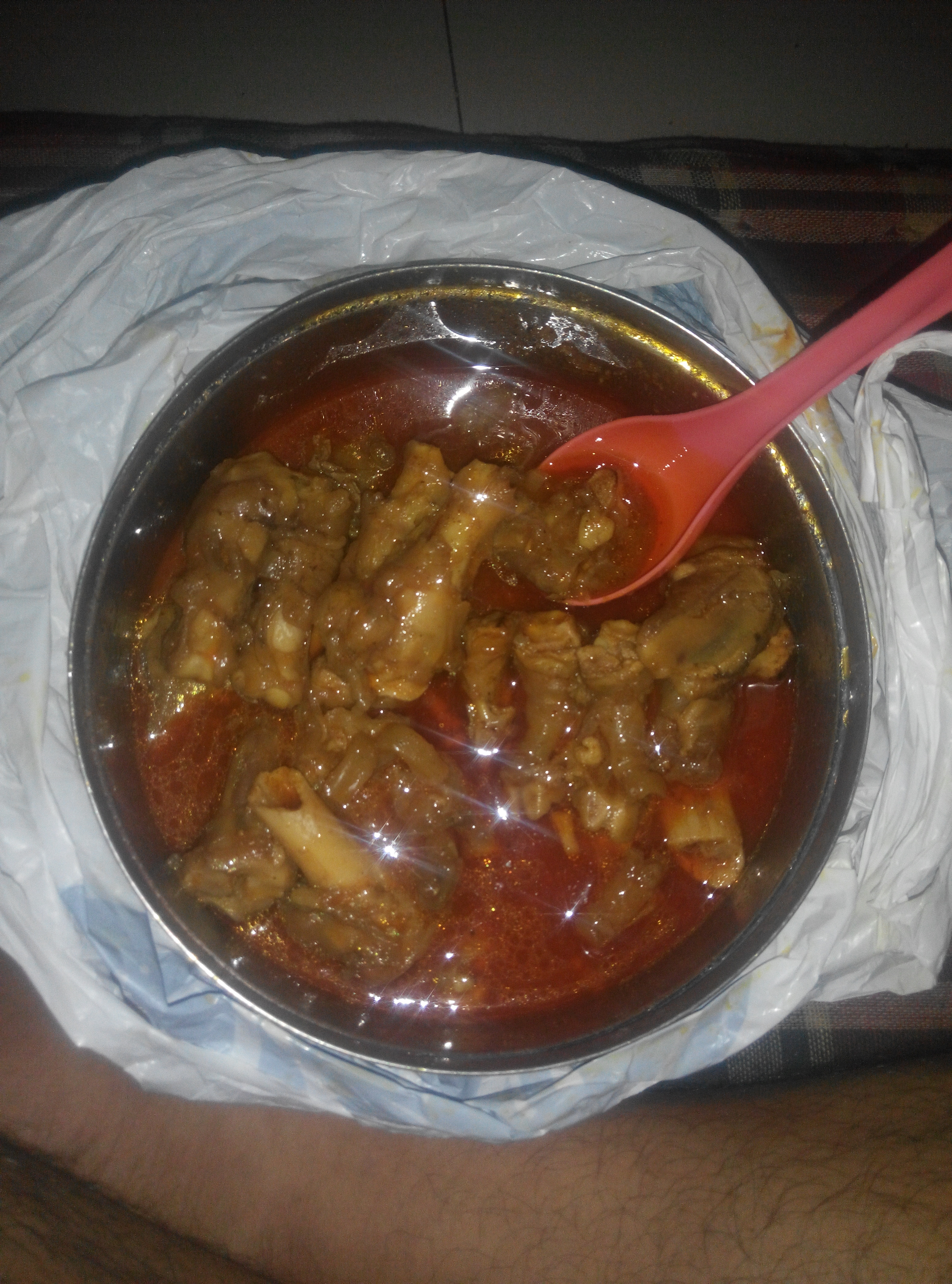
Paya curry cooked in Marathi style

Recipes for this dish vary regionally. The soup base is created by sautéed onions and garlic, where several curry-based spices are then added to the meat and bones. The cooked dish is served with a garnish of fresh diced ginger and fresh long coriander leaves, along with fresh sliced lemon.

== Cooking methods ==
It is cooked on mild heat for hours (usually overnight) on the stove. However, nowadays it is mostly cooked in a pressure cooker.

Historically, when people used wood or coal as a cooking fuel, preparation of this dish would start at night, slowly cooking it in the coals until morning. This dish has a soup-like consistency and is usually eaten as a breakfast food in the winter months with naan.

== Variations ==
There are many variations of this dish. A popular one is siri paya (سری پایا, सिरी पाया), where siri means the head of an animal. It is considered a delicacy.

== See also ==
- Haleem
- List of stews
- Nihari
