= Egyptian cuisine =

Egyptian cuisine makes heavy use of poultry, legumes, vegetables and fruit from Egypt's rich Nile Valley and Delta. Examples of Egyptian dishes include rice-stuffed vegetables and grape leaves, hummus, falafel, shawarma, kebab and kofta. Others include ful medames, mashed fava beans; koshary, lentils and pasta; and molokhiyya, jute leaf stew. A local type of pita known as eish baladi is a staple of Egyptian cuisine, and cheesemaking in Egypt dates back to the First Dynasty of Egypt, with Domiati being the most popular type of cheese consumed today.

Egyptian cuisine relies heavily on vegetables and legumes, but can also feature meats, most commonly rabbit and poultry such as squab, chicken, duck, quail and goose. Lamb and beef are commonly used in Egyptian cuisine, particularly for grilling and in a variety of stews and traditional dishes. Goat and camel are also eaten but are not as readily available nationwide. Offal is also a popular street food, often served in sandwiches. Fish and seafood are widely consumed across Egypt, with coastal regions such as Alexandria, Suez and Port Said being especially known for their seafood cuisine. Freshwater tilapia and mullet are the most popular types of fish in the country.

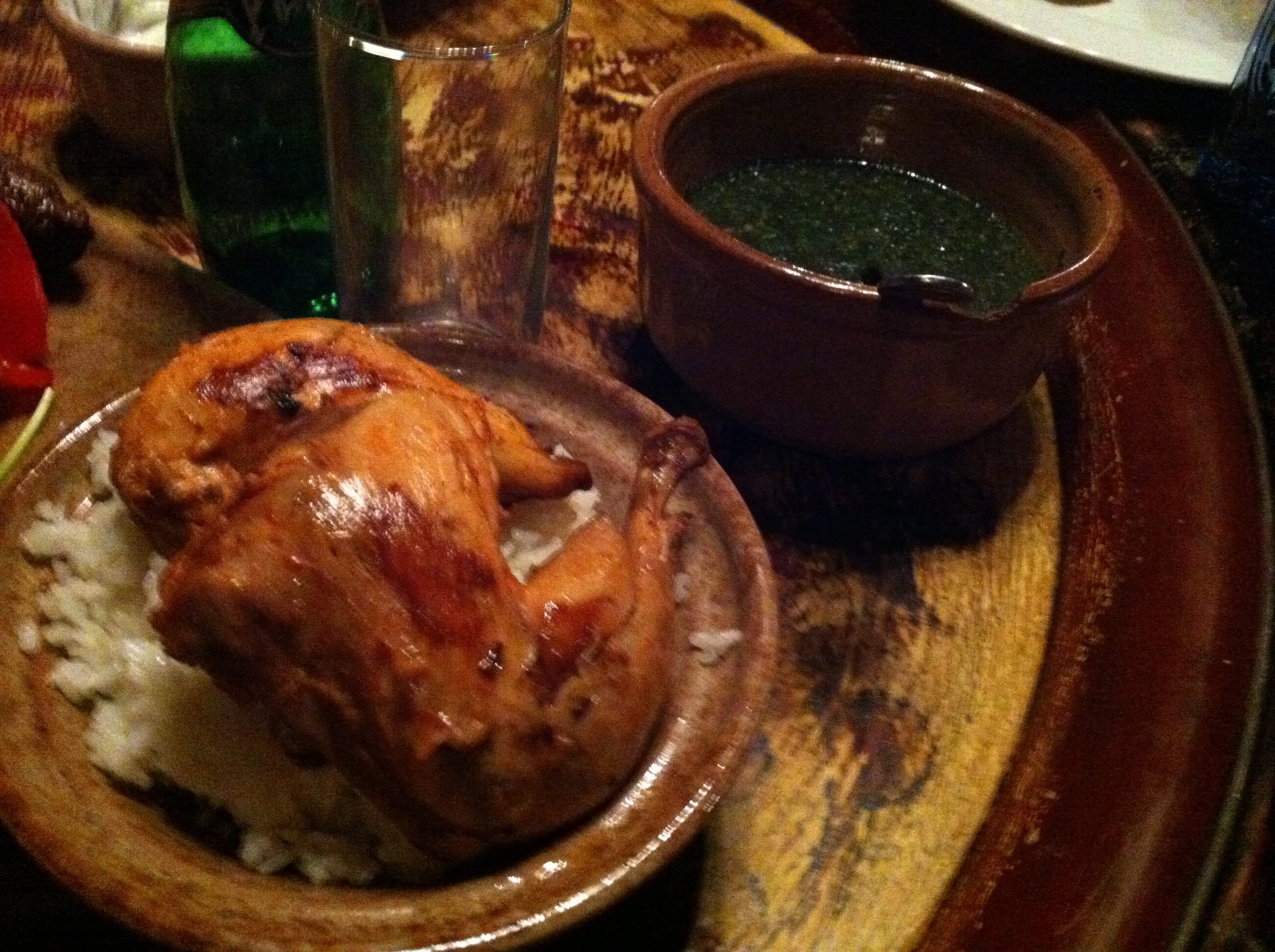
Molokhiya, a popular dish made from jute leaves, served with rice and chicken. Jute leaves were consumed in ancient Egypt, and a recipe for the dish appears in the 14th-century Egyptian cookbook Kanz al-Fawa’id.

A significant portion of Egyptian cuisine is vegetarian, largely due to the country's agricultural landscape and the farmers historical food traditions. The fertile banks of the Nile River are primarily used for cultivating crops rather than animal grazing, as arable land is limited and livestock farming requires extensive resources such as land, water and fodder. Additionally, the dietary practices of Christians during Lent, who observe religious restrictions that mandate an essentially vegan diet for extended periods of the year, further contribute to the prominence of plant-based dishes in Egyptian cuisine.

Tea is the national drink of Egypt and mint is a popular addition, while beer is the most common alcoholic beverage. Although Islam is the majority faith in Egypt and practicing Muslims tend to avoid alcohol, alcoholic drinks are still readily available in the country. Karkadeh is also a very popular traditional beverage in Egypt, served both cold and hot.

Popular desserts in Egypt include baqlawa, basbousa, kunafa and qatayef. Common ingredients in desserts include dates, honey, and almonds.

== History ==
=== Ancient Egypt ===
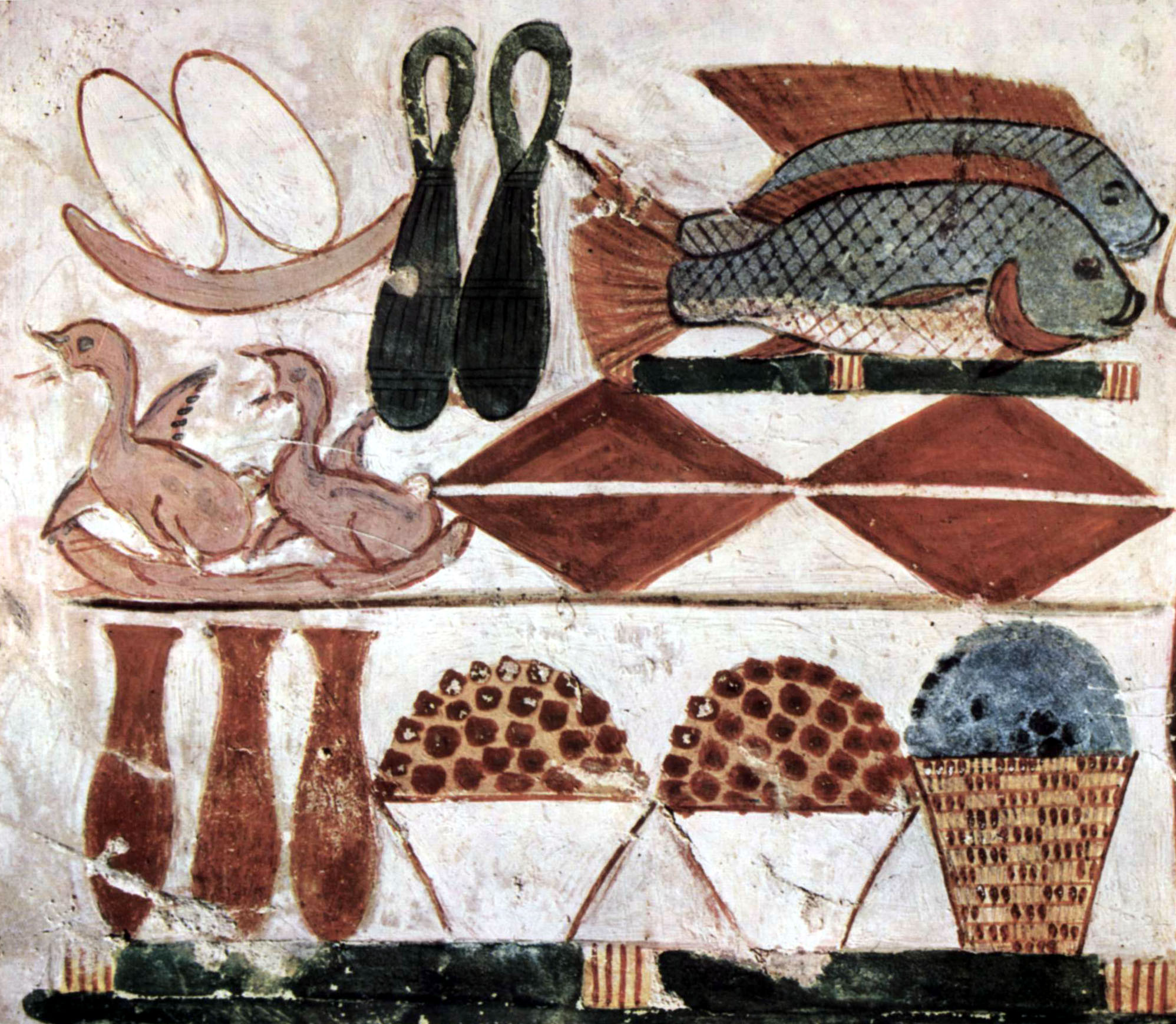
A mural in the tomb of Menna in Luxor, depicting various culinary offerings

Ancient Egyptian cuisine, which remained relatively consistent for over three millennia, was centered around bread and beer, consumed daily by all social classes. These staples were often accompanied by onions, legumes, vegetables, and, for those who could afford it, meat, fish, and poultry. Food preparation included baking, boiling, stewing, grilling, frying, and roasting, with wealthier Egyptians having access to imported spices and sweeteners such as honey and dates.

Ancient Egyptians also relied on a variety of dairy products, with cheese and butter playing a role in their diet. Oils for cooking and flavoring were derived from plants such as lettuce, radish, sesame, and safflower, while animal fat was commonly used in food preparation. Vegetables, including garlic, leeks, cucumbers, and various legumes, were widely cultivated, while fruits such as grapes and doum palm nuts were eaten fresh or dried. Archaeological evidence suggests that Egyptians practiced early forms of food preservation, such as drying fruits and salting meats and fish to extend their shelf life.

Meat, including beef, poultry, and fish, was regularly consumed, with archaeological evidence suggesting that even the workers building the pyramids had access to beef. Fruits such as dates, figs, and pomegranates were commonly eaten fresh or dried for preservation. Jute leaves were also cultivated for food.

Banquets, depicted in tomb paintings, were elaborate affairs featuring musicians, dancers, and an abundance of food, including roast meats, stews, vegetables, fruits, and cakes. Bread, typically made from emmer wheat, came in various shapes and textures, while beer, a key dietary component, was brewed from fermented wheat or barley and even functioned as a form of currency. Food in ancient Egypt was not merely sustenance but held deep religious and cultural significance. The goddess Hathor was often invoked during feasts, and offerings of bread, beer, and meat were made to the gods and the deceased in tombs to ensure their well-being in the afterlife.

Although no written recipes from ancient Egypt have survived, information about food preparation has been inferred from objects and utensils discovered in tombs. Several elements of ancient Egyptian cuisine remain part of the modern Egyptian diet, particularly staple foods. Although bread types today are made from different wheat species, traditional varieties that were known in ancient Egypt continue to be produced in Egypt today. The spring festival of Sham Ennessim preserves the ancient custom of eating chickpeas, salted mullet, and onions.

=== Greco-Roman Egypt ===
Food in Greco-Roman Egypt reflected both local traditions and foreign influences, particularly from the Greeks and Romans. The staple diet for most people consisted of grains, pulses, oil, and beer. Vegetables such as lentils, chickpeas, onions, cucumbers, and turnips were widely consumed, while fruits, especially dates, were an important source of vitamins. Olive oil, a product of the eastern Mediterranean region, was already known and used in ancient Egypt prior to Greek rule and became more widely used during the Greek period, gradually replacing radish oil, although it remained more expensive. Beer, traditionally made from fermented bread, was the dominant drink in earlier periods, but wine became increasingly popular, especially under Roman rule, with vineyards thriving in regions like Alexandria and Fayoum.

The cultivation of wheat in Egypt long predated Greek rule, with traditional emmer and spelt forming the basis of grain consumption. During the Ptolemaic period, the use of hard wheat increased and became more widely cultivated due to its role in tax payments and administrative systems. Meat, particularly pork, was commonly consumed by those who could afford it, with evidence showing its use in both religious and everyday contexts. Poultry such as ducks, hens, and doves were also consumed, and large dovecotes were built for breeding. Seafood, including fish and oysters from the Mediterranean, was available but primarily consumed by wealthier individuals. Written records from the period also describe the use of a variety of herbs and spices such as coriander, thyme, anise, fennel, and pepper, indicating a sophisticated approach to seasoning.

Social gatherings played an important role in food culture, particularly in the form of symposia, where men gathered to eat, drink, and engage in discussions. Banquet halls, often linked to temples, served as venues for communal meals, celebrations, and even wedding feasts. High-quality food was distinguished from lower-quality offerings, with premium meat and wine being more desirable. Wine, initially a luxury, became widely available and was commonly mixed with water, following Greek and Roman customs. Food consumption varied significantly across social classes, with the wealthy enjoying imported goods, elaborate dishes, and fine wines, while the lower classes relied on staple grains, pulses, and locally available produce.

=== Medieval Egypt ===
Medieval Egyptian cuisine was shaped by a combination of agriculture, trade, and cultural influences. The 14th century cookbook Kanz al-Fawa’id fī Tanwi‘ al-Mawa’id provides insight into the era's culinary practices. Egypt's fertile lands, nourished by the Nile, supported the cultivation of native and introduced crops, including rice, sugarcane, and citrus fruits, which arrived following the Arab conquest in 641 CE. The country's central position in the Islamic world also made it a hub for travel and migration, bringing Turks, Kurds, Persians, and other groups whose culinary traditions enriched local cuisine. Recipes in Kanz al-Fawa’id reflect this diversity, with dishes from Morocco, Persia, and Byzantium appearing alongside local specialties.

Trade further expanded the range of ingredients available in Egypt. The country imported nuts and fruits from the Levant while exporting local products such as salt-cured fish, cheese, and refined sugar. Egyptian merchants, known as the Karimi, played a key role in the spice trade, sourcing aromatics from India and Yemen. Cairo, as a major urban center, had a well-developed food culture that catered to different social classes. While the elite indulged in lavish feasts, commoners had access to affordable food, including bread, cheese, river mussels, and legumes. Hospitals provided free meals to the sick, and palace kitchens occasionally distributed surplus food to the public.

Food markets and public kitchens were central to urban life. Cairo's markets, described in detail by historian al-Maqrizi (1364–1442), offered a variety of food services, from street vendors selling porridge and grilled meats to professional cooks who prepared meals for those without home kitchens. Regulations ensured food safety and hygiene, requiring bakers and cooks to follow strict cleanliness measures. Public bakeries and communal ovens were widely used, especially in dense city centers where fire hazards discouraged home cooking.

The medieval Egyptian kitchen was well-equipped, especially in wealthier households, where multiple hands worked to prepare complex dishes. Cooking methods involved stoves, clay ovens, and brick dome ovens. Spices, particularly mastic gum, were widely used, likely to mask the strong smell of local meats. The concept of food as medicine, based on Galenic principles, influenced diets, with certain ingredients used to balance bodily humors. Recipes in Kanz al-Fawa’id included not only meals but also medicinal preparations, aphrodisiacs, and hygiene products such as scented toothpicks and soaps. Many culinary traditions included in recipes and cookbooks from medieval Egypt, including staple dishes like molokheya, ful medames, and bamya, have endured into the present day.

Wheat, barley and rice were part of the medieval Egyptian diet, but sources are conflicted about millet. According to Abd al-Latif al-Baghdadi (1162–1231), it was unknown outside a small area where it was cultivated in Upper Egypt. This seems to be supported by chronicler Muhammad ibn Iyas (1448–1522), who wrote that millet consumption was unusual, if not unheard of, in Cairo. Shihab al-Umari (1301–1384), on the other hand, says it was among the most popular cereal grains consumed in Egypt in that time.

Sorghum was, like millet, cultivated in Upper Egypt, but was not considered a desirable crop by residents of Cairo. There, it was consumed only during famine or other times of scarcity during which sorghum was preferred to other wheat substitutes used to make emergency bread rations like millet, bran, or broad beans.

In The Tale of Judar and His Brothers, an Egyptian story from Thousand and One Arabian Nights, the main character, a poverty-stricken fisherman named Judar, acquires a magic bag belonging to a necromancer of Maghrebi origin. This bag supplies its owner with food like rozz mefalfel, a rice dish seasoned with cinnamon and mastic, sometimes colored with saffron and prepared stock and tail fat.

=== Early Modern Egypt ===
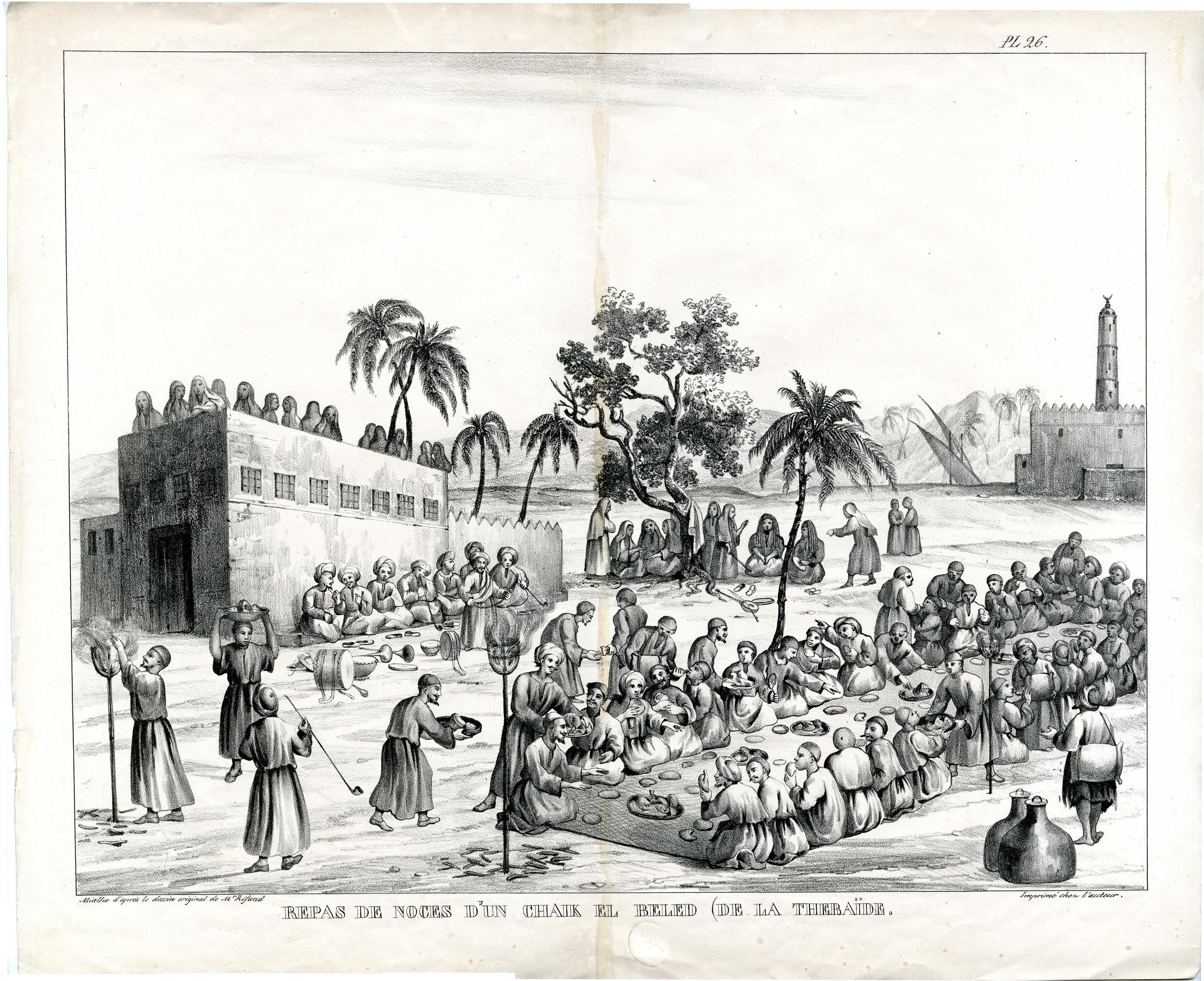
Illustration from 1830 of a feast in Egypt, with food served outdoors, accompanied by musicians and female performers.

In 17th-century Egypt, food culture reflected the stark divide between urban elites and rural peasants. Peasants primarily relied on simple staples like keshk, fermented grain and dairy, mish, a fermented cheese, ful medames, stewed fava beans, molokheya, lentils, and barley bread, often garnished with onions. In contrast, urban cuisine, particularly among the Ottoman-influenced elites, featured refined versions of these dishes, incorporating butter, meats, and elaborate seasonings. Fish was common, particularly mullet and seabream, prepared in stews or with keshk, while fesikh, salt-cured fish, remained a delicacy. Poultry and meat were rare in peasant diets but abundant in city kitchens, where dishes included stuffed pigeons and rich stews. Despite this divide, many core ingredients, fava beans, molokheya, and preserved dairy, remained central to Egyptian cuisine.

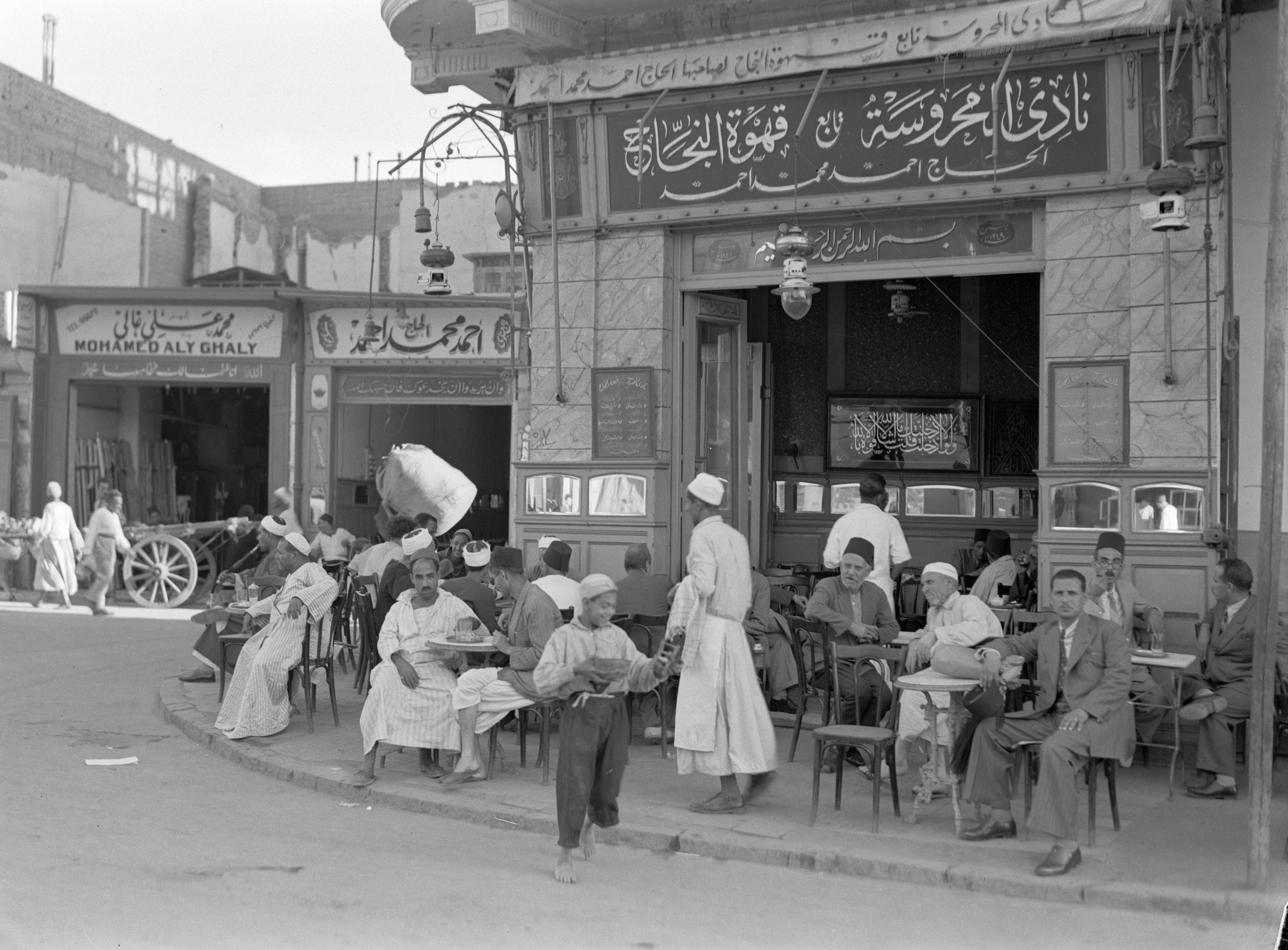
A traditional Cairo coffeehouse in 1935

In the 19th century the culinary habits of elite landowning families reflected a blend of local and Westernized influences. Many of these families, having moved from the countryside to Cairo by the later half of the 19th century, maintained elaborate household kitchens staffed by professional chefs. Recipes were often guarded secrets, passed through generations of cooks rather than through written records. However, after the 1952 revolution, many of these families lost their wealth, their large homes were sold, and the trained staff dispersed, leading to the gradual disappearance of a distinct upper-class cuisine.

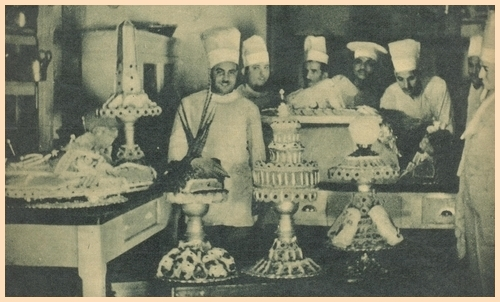
Buffet at the wedding of Queen Farida in 1938

Efforts to document these lost culinary traditions relied on oral history, personal recollections, and rare cookbooks, such as those written by the chefs of King Fuad. Some families, like the Abaza family, preserved unique dishes such as abbazeyya, a chicken dish cooked in lentil paste. However, many recipes vanished as home cooking in elite circles was historically left to hired chefs, who either guarded their techniques or adapted dishes to suit their employers.

The rise of domestic science education and the influence of European culinary techniques in the 20th century played a significant role in shaping Egyptian cuisine and democratizing recipes. One of the most influential figures in this transformation was Nazira Nicola (1902–1992), known as Abla Nazira. Her cookbook, Kitab Abla Nazira, first published in 1941 as a domestic science manual, became a household staple. Trained in England, she introduced European techniques while preserving and refining Egyptian cuisine. Through her books and Egyptian radio appearances, she became a national icon, promoting cooking as an essential skill for modern women.

By the early twentieth century, the influence of Egypt's Greek community on the country's restaurant-scene led to the adaptation of recipes like pastitsio and negresco, which later made its way into Egyptian cookbooks, including Kitab Abla Nazira. The dishes evolved over time, influenced by Mediterranean and French cooking styles. One notable example of this culinary fusion is macarona bil-bechamel, a baked pasta dish, influenced by pastitsio, with bechamel that was introduced by the French-trained chefs of the khedivial palace and luxury hotels of the mid-nineteenth century.

== Features ==
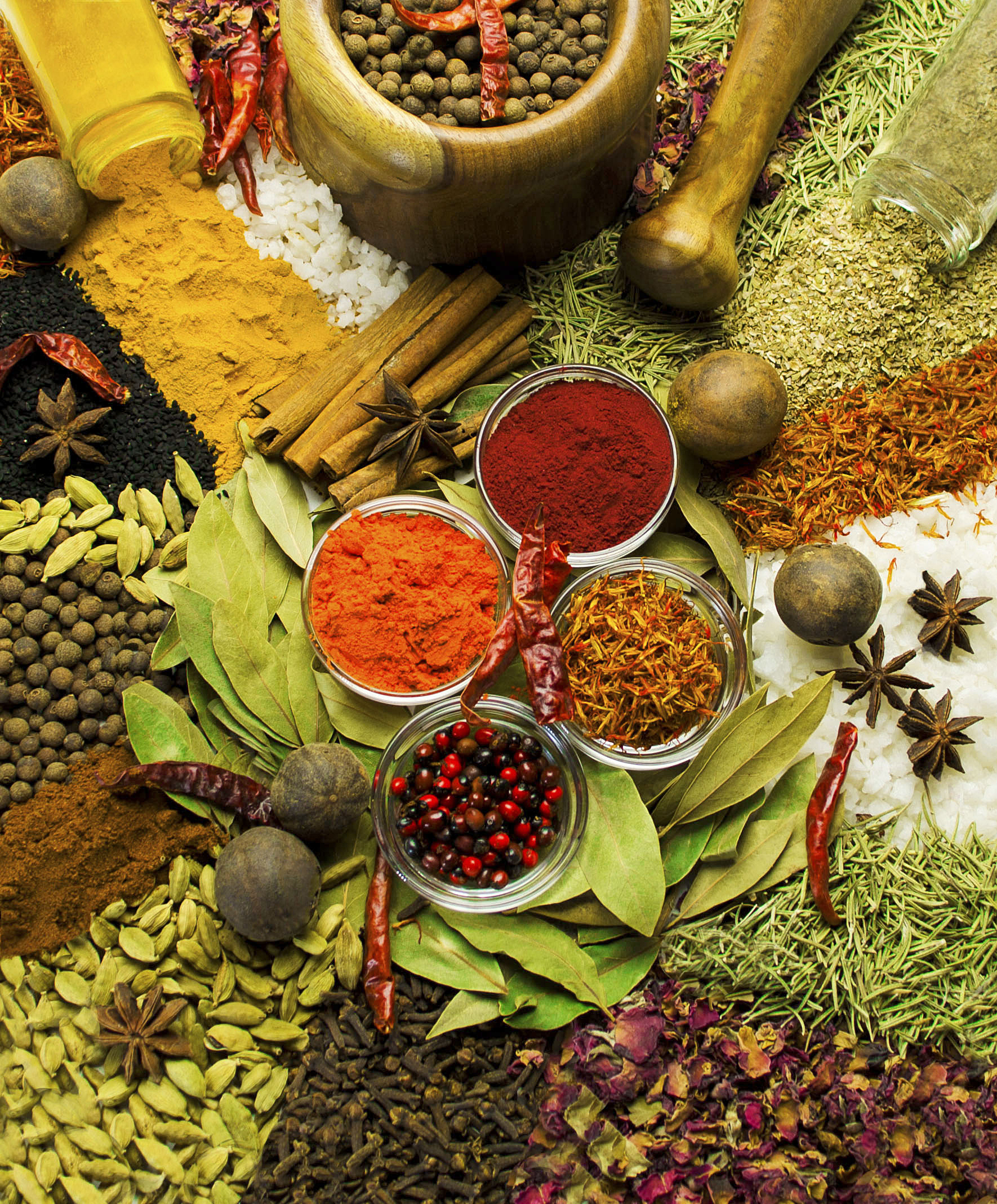
Spices commonly used in Egypt

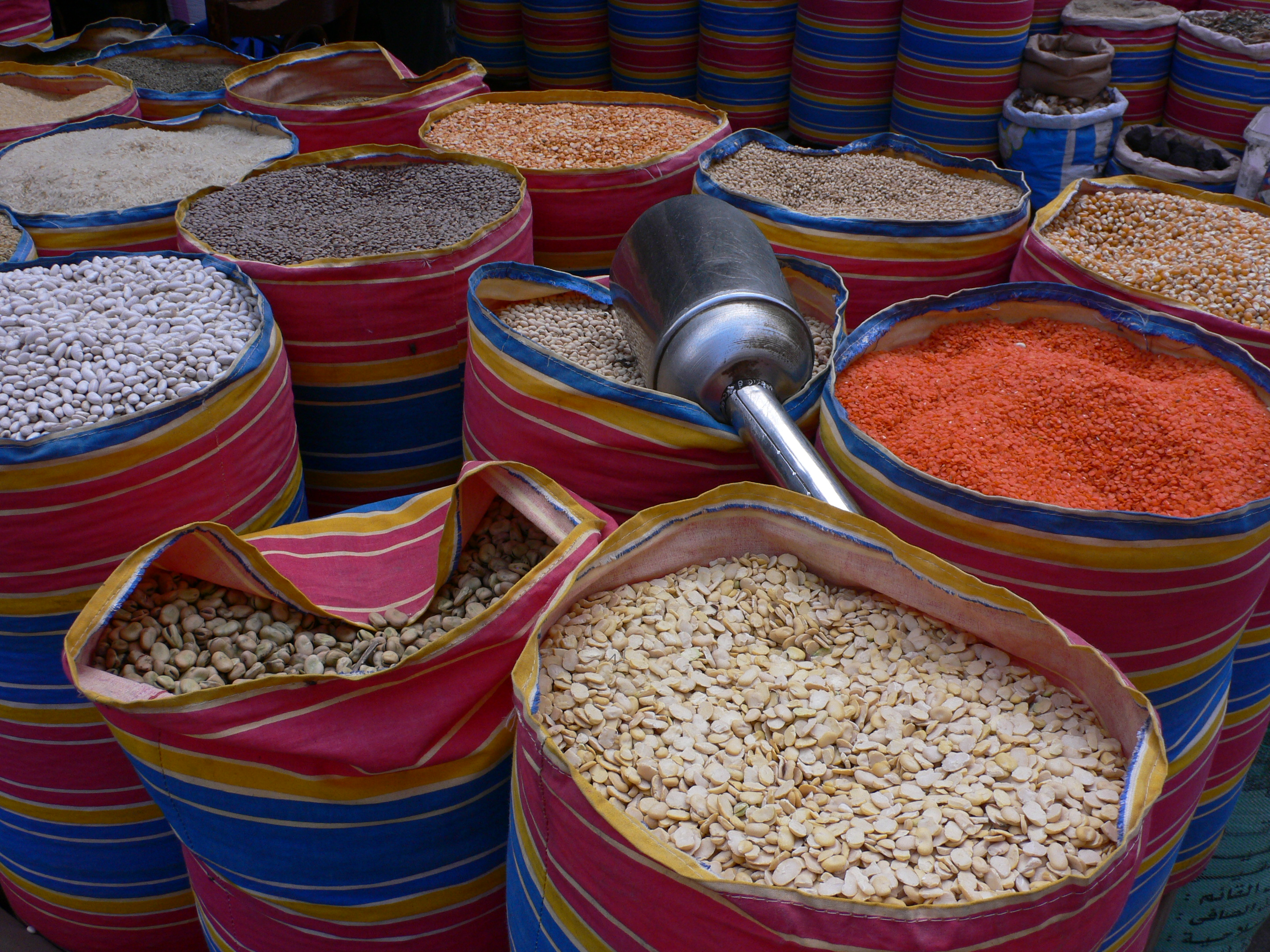
Legumes, widely used in Egyptian cuisine, on display in Alexandria

Egyptian cuisine is notably conducive to vegetarian diets, as it relies heavily on legume and vegetable dishes. Though food in Alexandria and the coast of Egypt tends to use a great deal of fish and other seafood, for the most part Egyptian cuisine is based on foods that grow out of the ground.

Egypt's Red Sea ports were the main points of entry for spices to Europe. Easy access to various spices has, throughout the years, left its mark on Egyptian cuisine. Cumin is the most commonly used spice. Other common spices include coriander, cardamom, chili, aniseed, bay leaves, dill, parsley, ginger, cinnamon, mint and cloves.

Common meats featured in Egyptian cuisine are pigeon, chicken and duck. These are often boiled to make the broth for various stews and soups. Lamb and beef are the most common meats used for grilling. Grilled meats such as kofta (كفتة), kabab (كباب) and grilled cutlets are categorically referred to as mashwiyat (مشويات).

Offal, variety meats, is popular in Egypt. Liver sandwiches, a specialty of Alexandria, are a popular fast-food in cities. Chopped-up pieces of liver fried with bell peppers, chili, garlic, cumin and other spices are served in a baguette-like bread called eish fino. Cow and sheep brain are eaten in Egypt.

As the majority of Egyptians are Muslims and follow Islamic dietary laws, pork is not widely available. However, members of Egypt's Christian minority raise pigs and consume pork. Specialty stores in cities sell pork products, including imported varieties, primarily catering to non-Muslim Egyptians and foreigners.

Foie gras, a well-known delicacy, is still enjoyed today by Egyptians. Its flavor is described as rich, buttery, and delicate, unlike that of an ordinary duck or goose liver. Foie gras is sold whole, or is prepared into mousse, parfait, or pâté, and may also be served as an accompaniment to another food item, such as steak. The technique involves gavage, cramming food into the throat of domesticated ducks and geese, and dates as far back as 2500 BC, when the ancient Egyptians began keeping birds for food.

== Customs ==
Egyptian dining customs are characterized by several important social and cultural practices. It is considered improper to use the left hand for eating, as the left hand is associated with hygienic functions. When dining, it is customary to sit next to someone of the same sex unless the host suggests otherwise. During the month of Ramadan, eating, drinking, or smoking around others during the daytime is generally shunned. However, leniency is often shown towards foreigners, who are not expected to be privy to such cultural sensitivities, and most food establishments remain open during the day throughout Ramadan.

Meals are typically served later than in Western cultures, with diners often arriving at restaurants around 10 pm or later, particularly in the summer. The main meal of the day is usually lunch, which is served during standard restaurant and café hours. In the evening, Egyptians tend to have lighter meals or snacks rather than a large dinner, except for special occasions. Family gatherings are common, and meals tend to be lengthy, with smoking frequently occurring during dining. Portion sizes are typically large, and food wastage is frowned upon.

== Cheeses ==
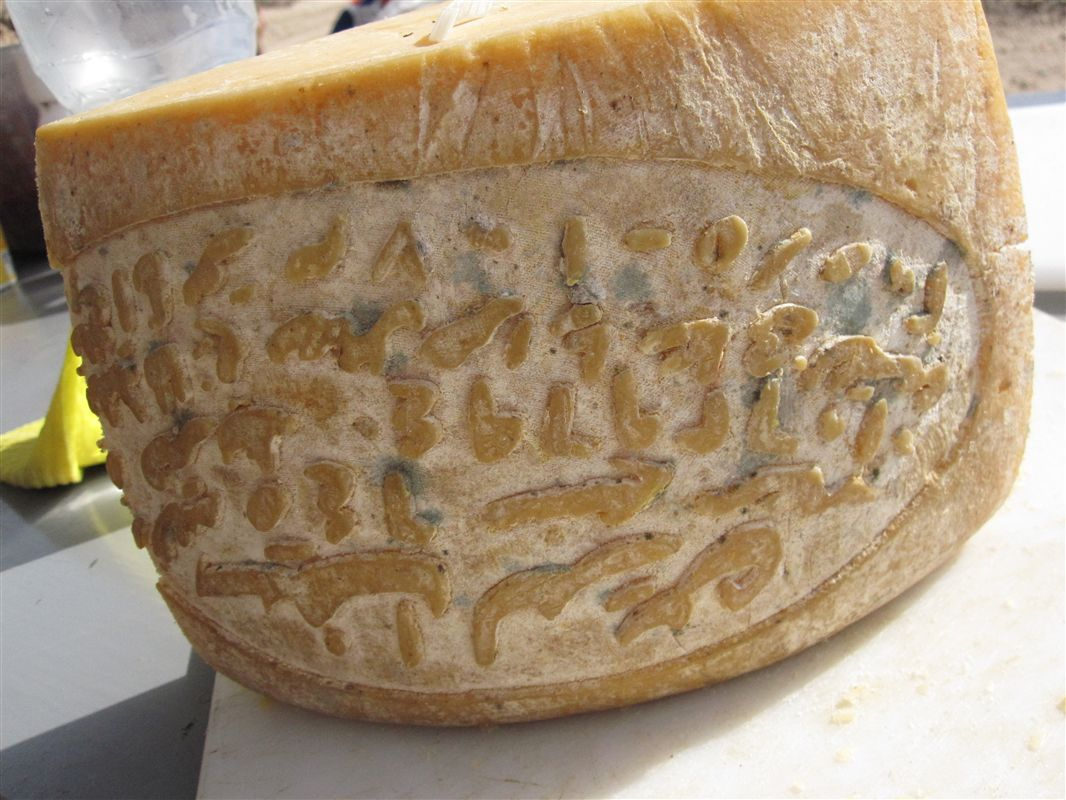
A rumi cheese wheel

Cheese is thought to have originated in the Middle East. Two alabaster jars found at Saqqara, dating from the First Dynasty of Egypt, contained cheese. These were placed in the tomb about 3,000 BC. They were likely fresh cheeses coagulated with acid or a combination of acid and heat. An earlier tomb, that of King Hor-Aha, may also have contained cheese which, based on the hieroglyphic inscriptions on the two jars, appears to be from Upper and Lower Egypt. The pots are similar to those used today when preparing mish.

Cheeses include domiati (جبنة دمياطي), the most widely-eaten in Egypt; Areesh cheese (جبنة اريش) made from laban rayeb; Rumi cheese (جبنه رومي), a hard, salty, ripened variety of cheese that belongs to the same family as Pecorino Romano and Manchego.

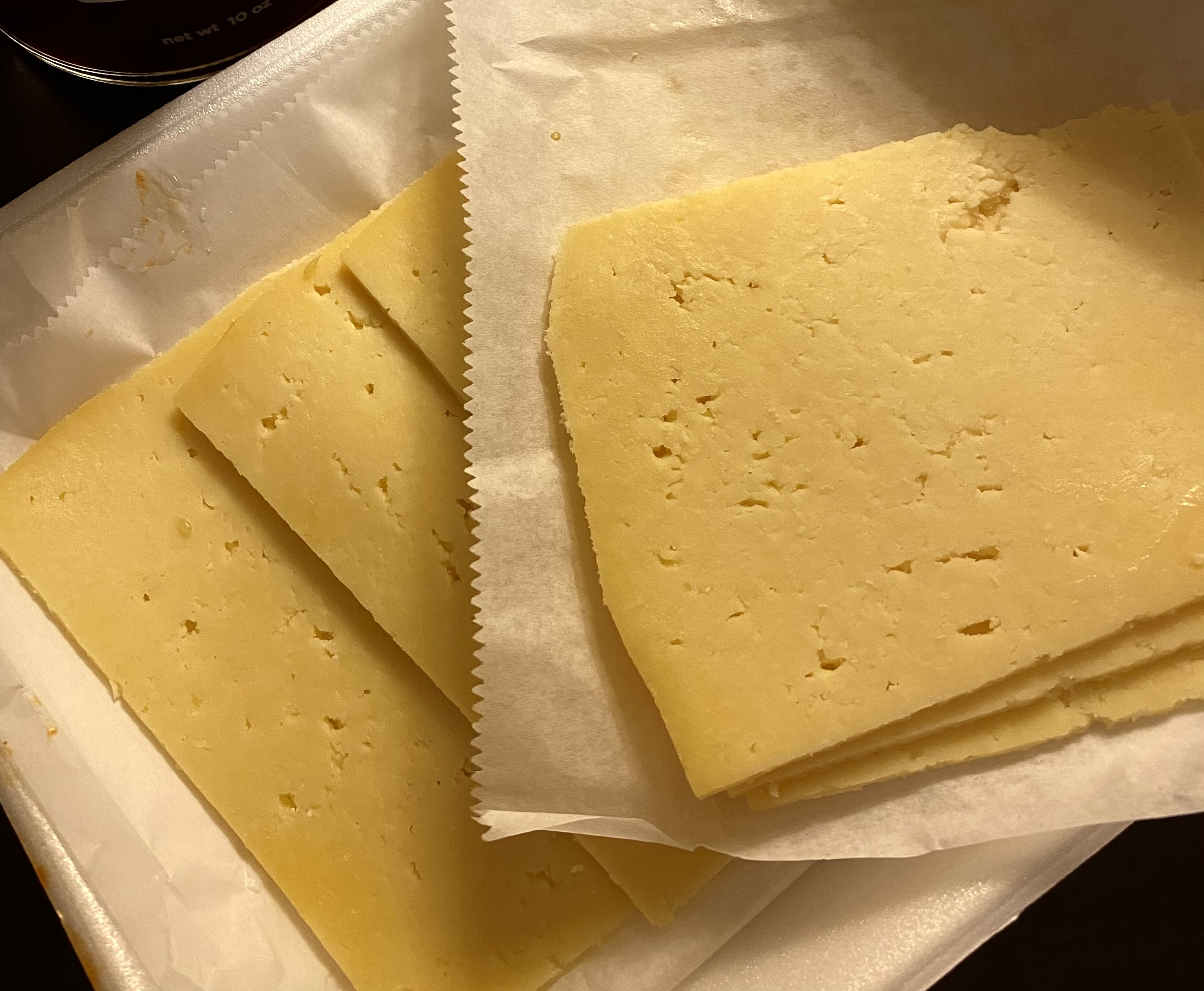
Slices of rumi

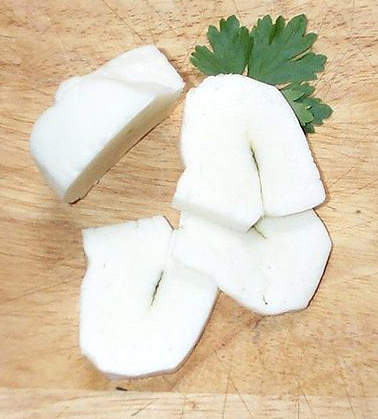
Halloumi

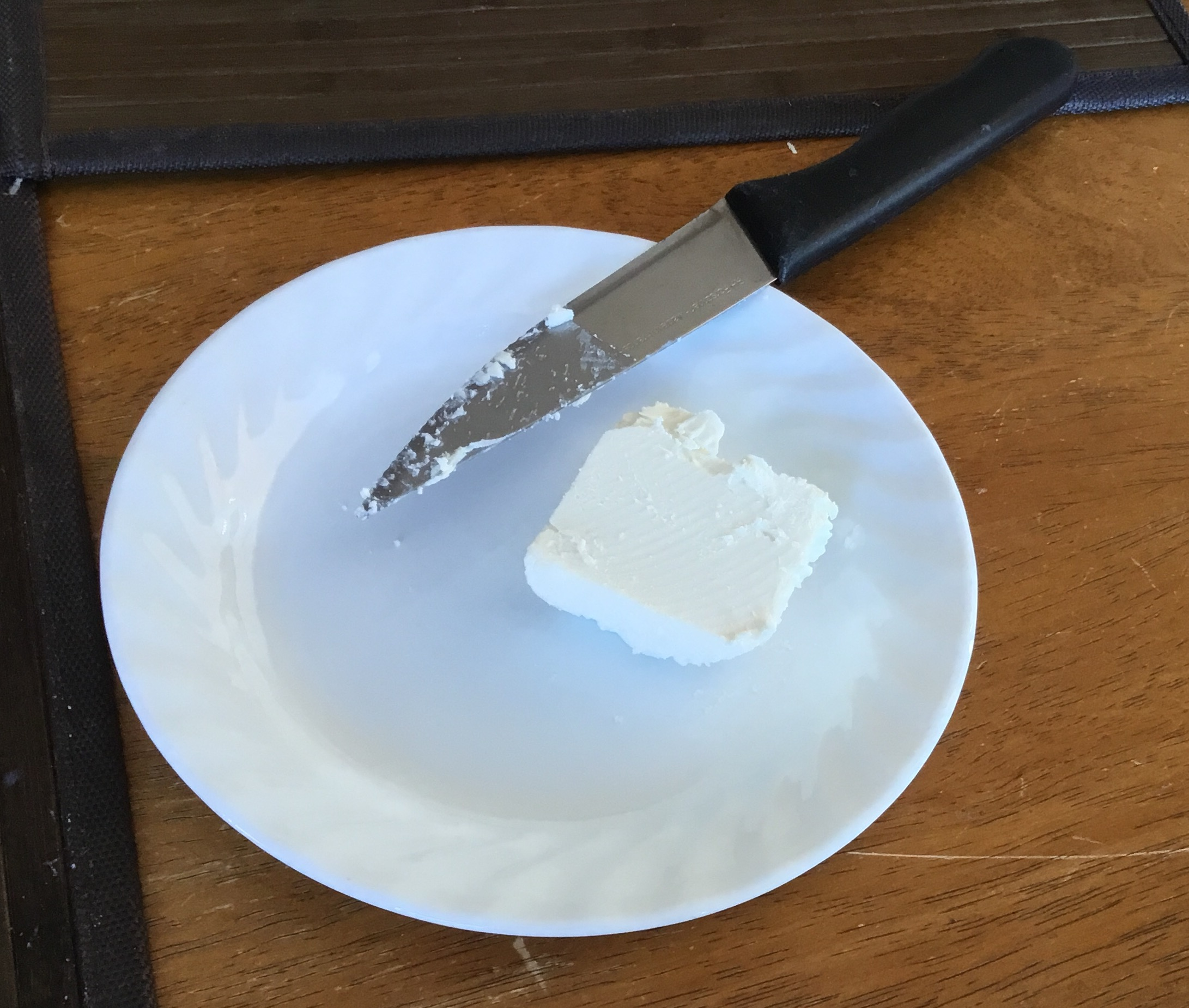
Domiati

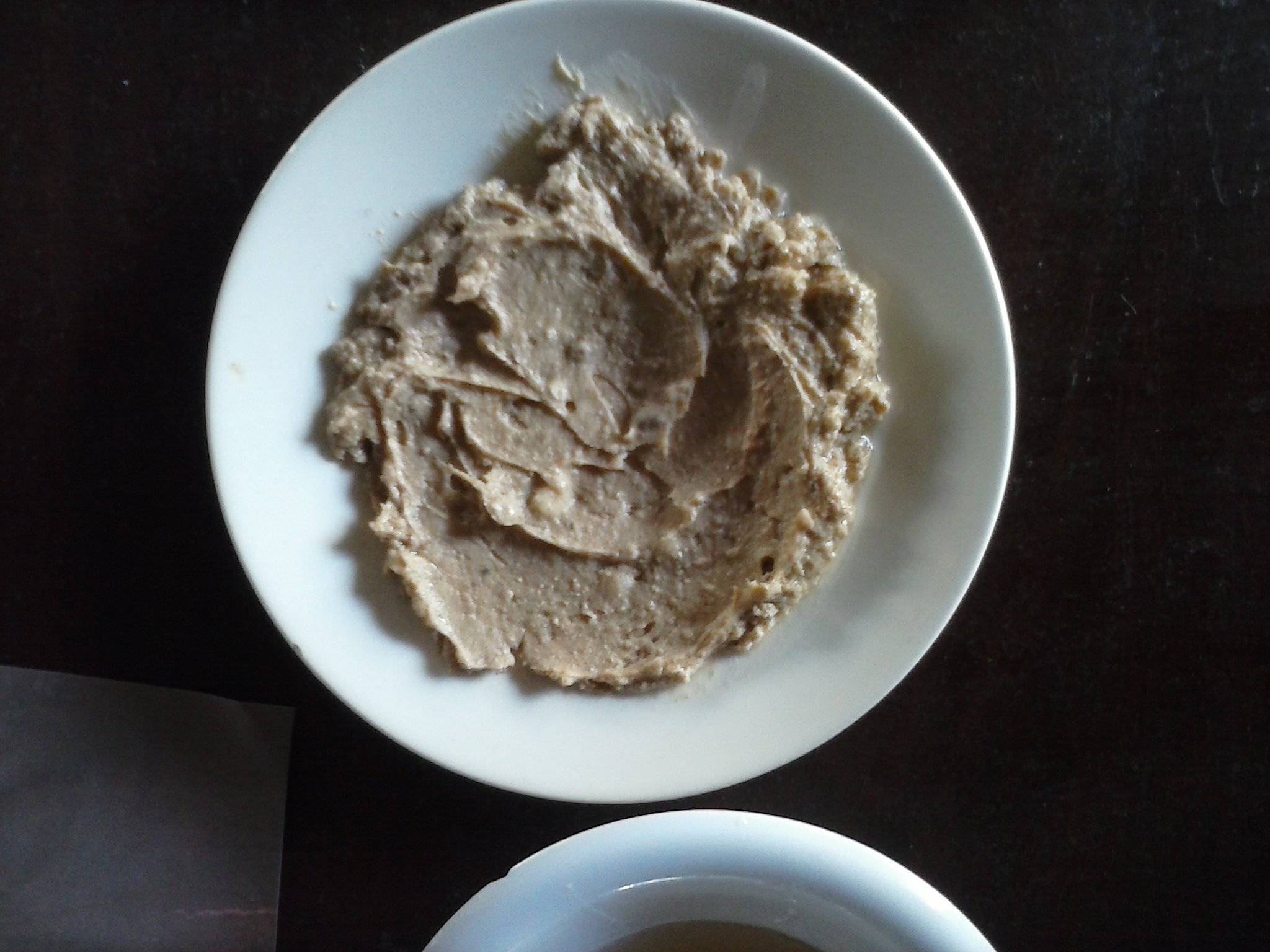
Mish

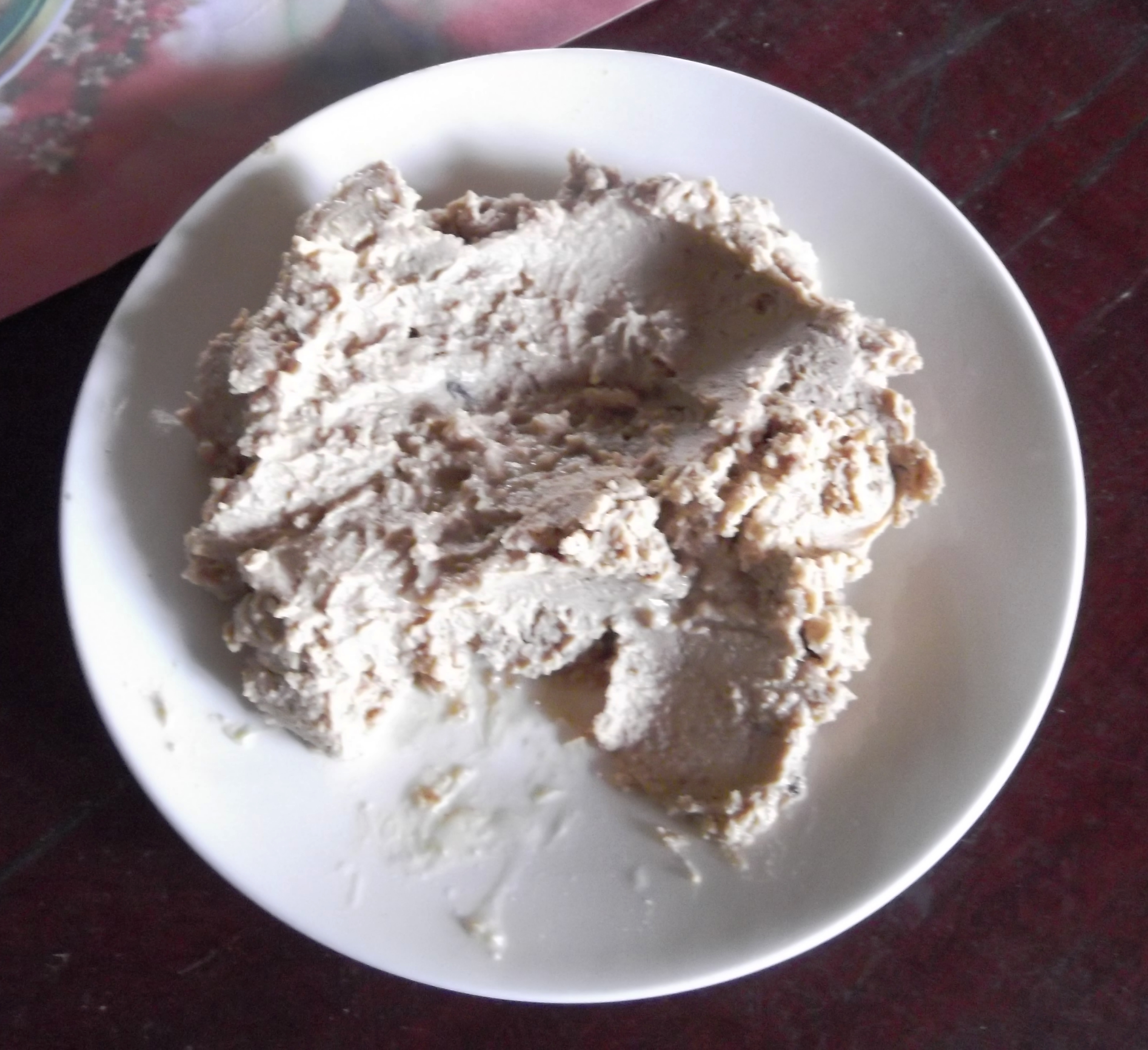
Morta

== Cured meats ==
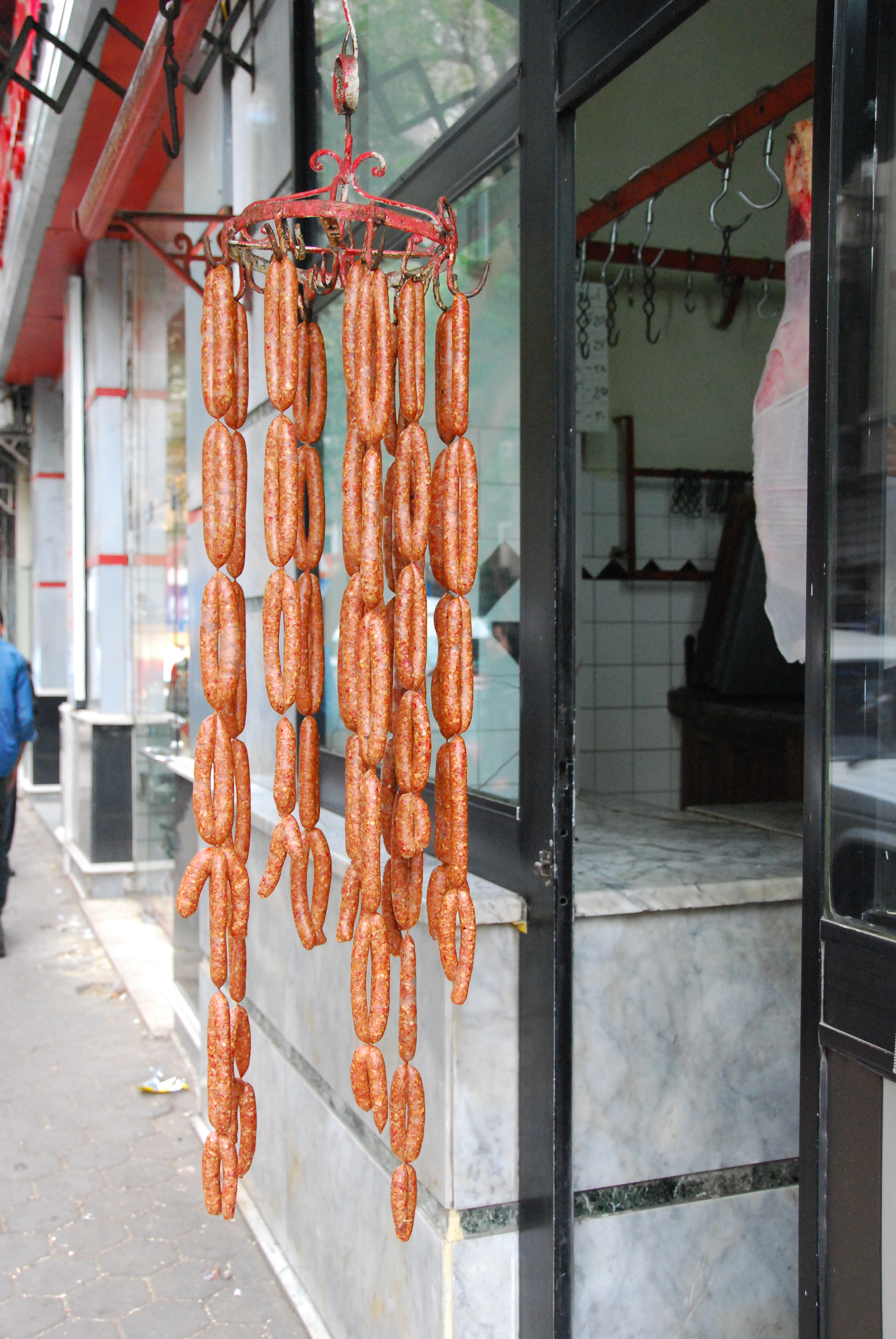
Sogoq hanging outside a butcher

Bastirma (بسطرمة) and sogoq (سجق, sogo'), also called sodoq (سدق, sodo') in parts of Egypt, are two traditional Egyptian cured meats that feature prominently in the country's culinary heritage. They are commonly enjoyed on their own or incorporated into various dishes.

Bastirma is typically prepared using lean cuts of beef or water buffalo, such as the eye of round or tenderloin, which are cured with salt to draw out moisture. After curing, the meat is coated with a wet paste made from a spice mixture that includes fenugreek, paprika, cumin, black pepper, and garlic, forming a distinctive crust that imparts strong flavors. The meat is air-dried for a period until firm, which can differ depending on its size. It is served in thin slices.

Sogoq, is a spicy sausage made from ground beef mixed with spices such as cumin, garlic, paprika, and chili powder. The mixture is stuffed into sheep intestines and left to dry and ferment, resulting in a flavorful and aromatic sausage. The spice mix may differ depending on the house-blend of the butcher.

While pastirma and sujuk are their regional namesakes, the Egyptian versions are distinguished by specific spice blends and preparation techniques that reflect local tastes and traditions. Egyptian sogoq is closer to sausages like merguez and makanek than it is to the sujuk eaten in other parts of the region.

== Bread ==
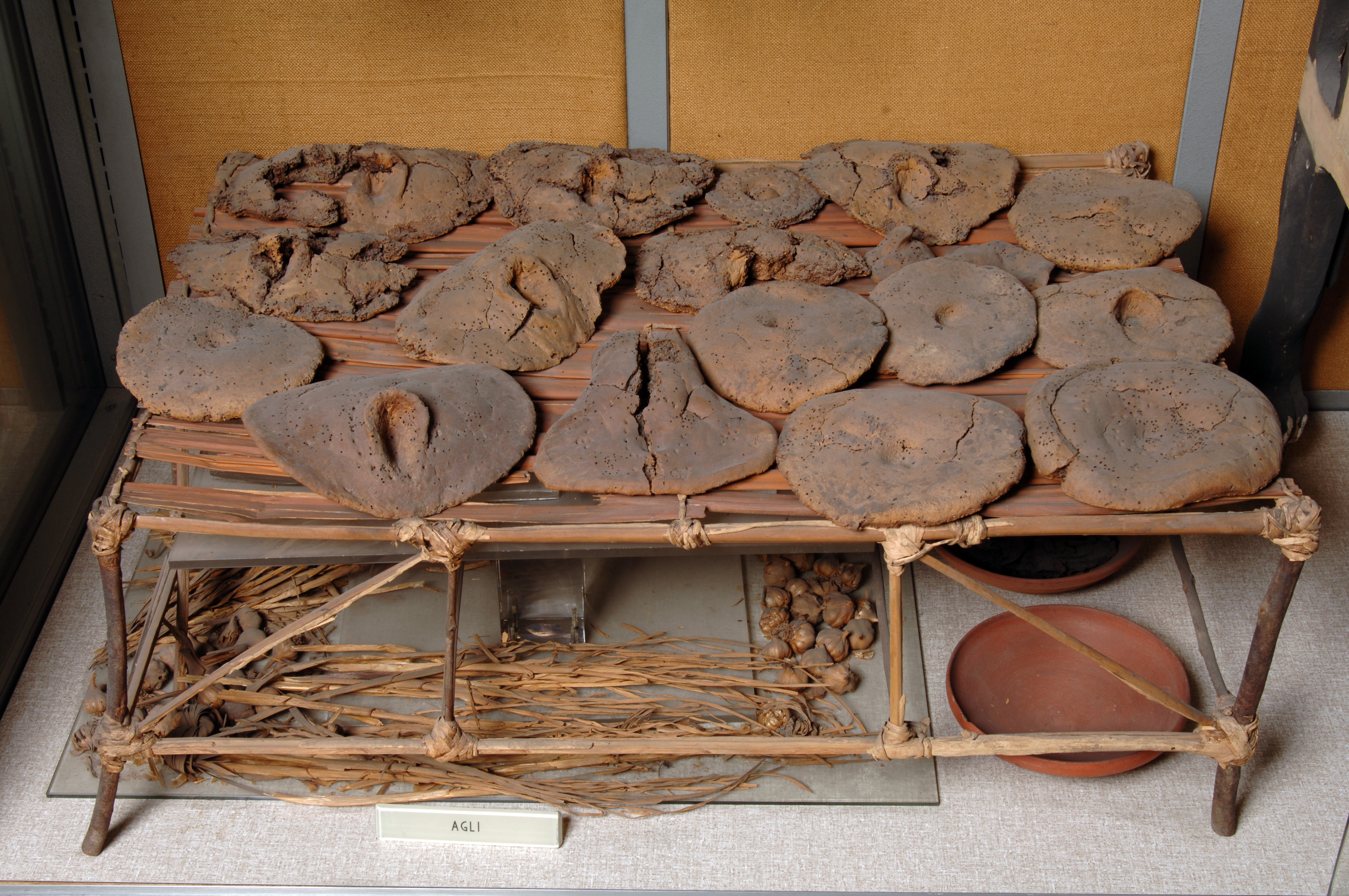
Bread loaves from the New Kingdom period, between 1425 and 1353 BC

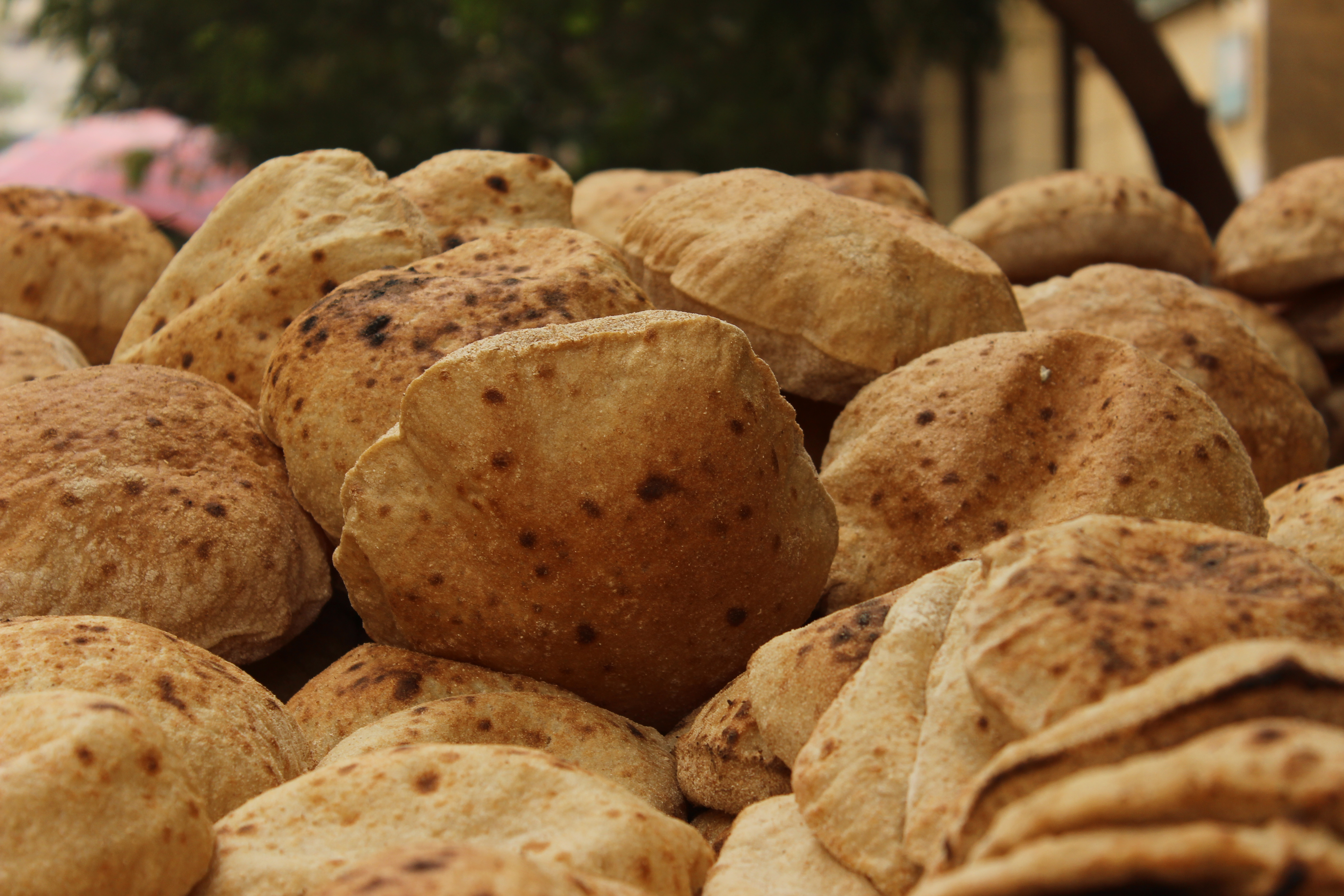
Eish baladi at the bakery

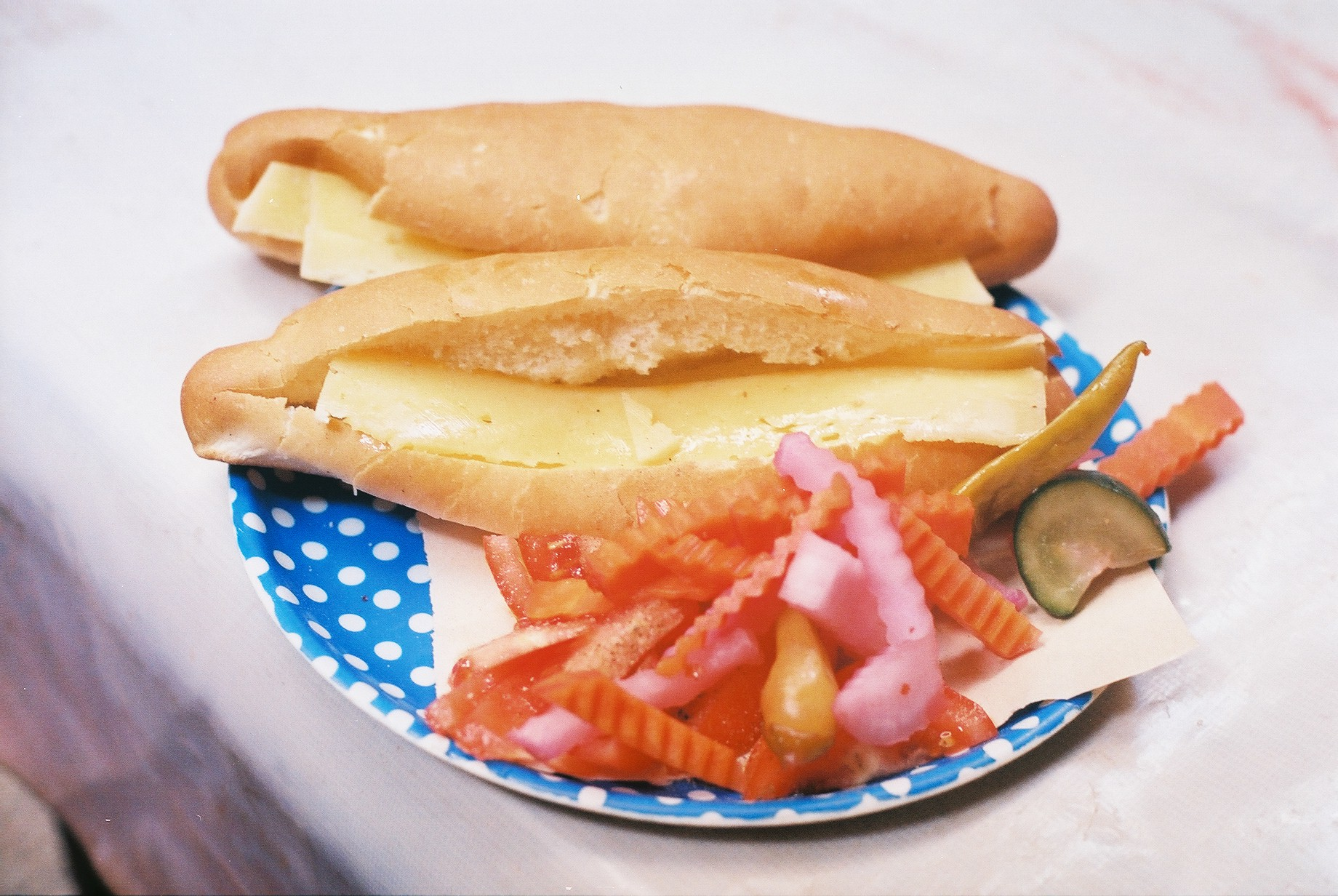
Slices of rumi cheese in eish fino served with a side of torshi

Bread made from a simple recipe forms the backbone of Egyptian cuisine. It is consumed at almost all Egyptian meals; a working-class or rural Egyptian meal might consist of little more than bread and beans. The Atlas of Egyptian Popular Heritage, published by the Ministry of Culture, lists more than 60 different types of bread in Egypt, while the Agricultural Museum in Cairo has documented over 40 distinct varieties. While many traditional recipes have endured, numerous others have been replaced by industrialized varieties, predominantly made with bleached wheat flour.

Bread-making in Egypt dates back nearly 5,800 years, with early evidence of bread made from emmer wheat, a low-gluten grain that was manually ground and leavened using natural yeast and lactic acid bacteria. Archaeological findings reveal various bread types, including those made with barley, chickpea flour, and breads incorporating fig paste, coriander seeds, and nabq fruits. Wall inscriptions and tomb scenes from the Old Kingdom depict detailed bread production processes, including grinding wheat, mixing dough, and baking in mudbrick ovens.

By the Greco-Roman period, hard wheats such as bread wheat and durum wheat replaced emmer, leading to a variety of flour grades used in bread-making. Written records from the period list different types of flour, but surviving loaves are rare due to the decline of bread offerings in tombs. During the Ottoman period, bread production was closely regulated by the state, which controlled grain storage, distribution, and pricing to prevent shortages. Bakeries, guilds, and market inspectors ensured hygiene and standardized bread weights and prices. Baking techniques included traditional clay ovens called tabun, and a heated metal disc called sag, both still in use today. Imported maize from Mesoamerica in the 17th century introduced new bread varieties, eventually making corn the second most important cereal in Egypt by the 19th century.

Until the 20th century, home baking remained common, especially in villages, but urban populations increasingly relied on private and state-run bakeries. The introduction of subsidized wholewheat eish baladi further reduced home baking, leading to a decline in bread variety. Despite historical diversity, the number of bread types has diminished, with few modern studies documenting regional variations and traditional recipes.

The local bread is a form of hearty, thick, gluten-rich pita bread called eish baladi (Arabic: عيش [ʕeːʃ], Egyptian Arabic pronunciation: [ʕeːʃ]; . The word "[ʕeːʃ]" comes from the Semitic root ع-ي-ش ʕ-Ī-Š with the meaning "to live, be alive." The word ʿayš itself has the meaning of "life, way of living...; livelihood, subsistence" in Modern Standard and Classical Arabic; folklore holds that this synonymity indicates the centrality of bread to Egyptian life.

On a culinary level, bread is commonly used as a utensil, at the same time providing carbohydrates and protein to the Egyptian diet. Egyptians use bread to scoop up food, sauces, and dips and to wrap kebabs, falafel, to keep the hands from becoming greasy. Most pita breads are baked at high temperatures (450 °F or 232 °C), causing the flattened rounds of dough to puff up dramatically. When removed from the oven, the layers of baked dough remain separated inside the deflated pita, which allows the bread to be opened into pockets, creating a space for use in various dishes. Common breads include:

- Bataw (بتاو)
- Eish baladi (عيش بلدي)
- Eish el kaizer (عيش الكيزر)
- Eish fayesh (عيش فايش)
- Eish fino (عيش فينو)
- Eish merahrah (عيش مرحرح)
- Eish shami (عيش شامي)
- Eish shamsi (عيش شمسي)
- Eish zallut (عيش زلط)
- Farasheeh (فراشيح)
- Libbah (لبة)
- Kabed (كابد)
- Feteer meshaltet (فطير مشلتت)

== Starters and salads ==
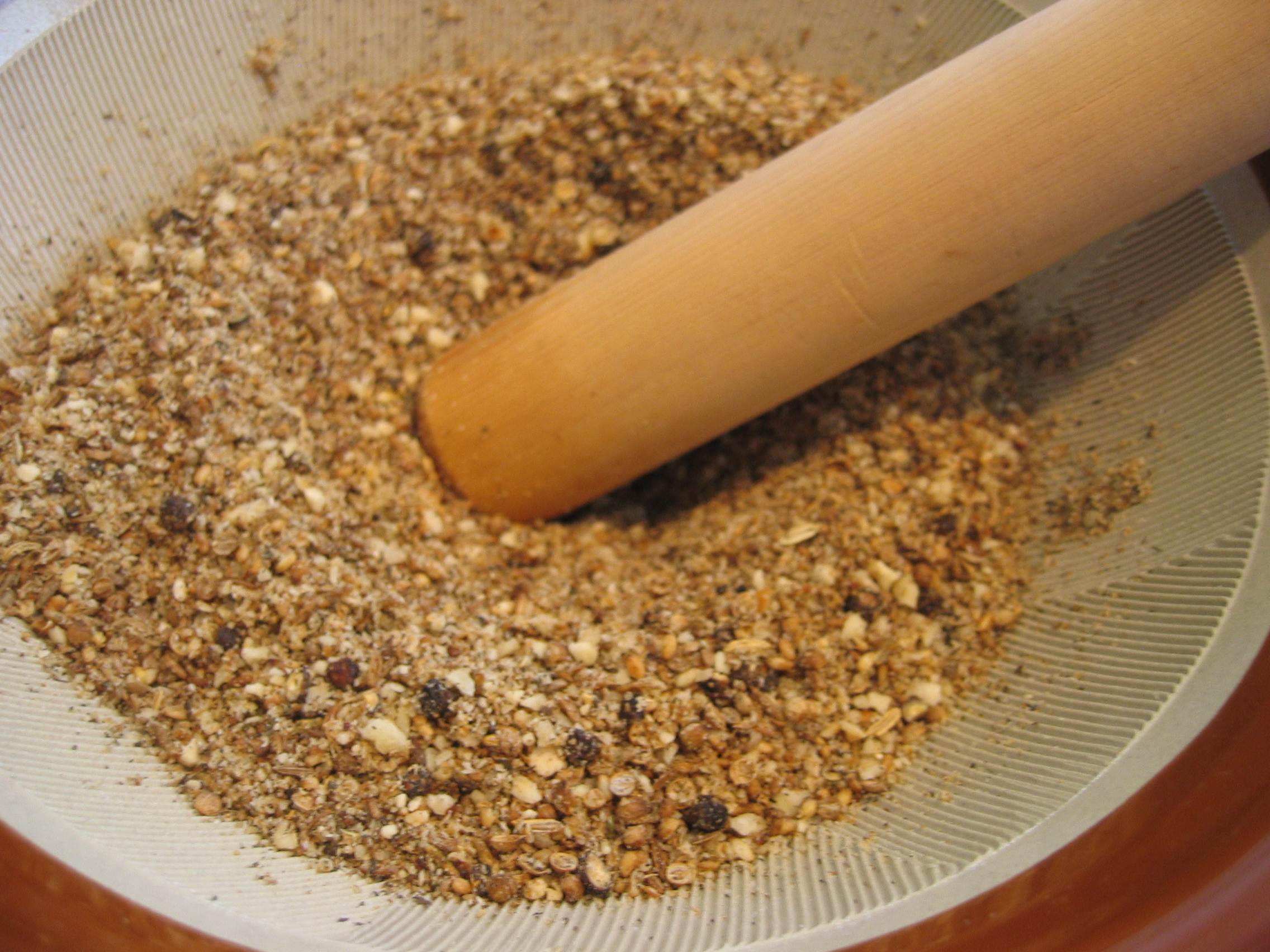
Duqqa

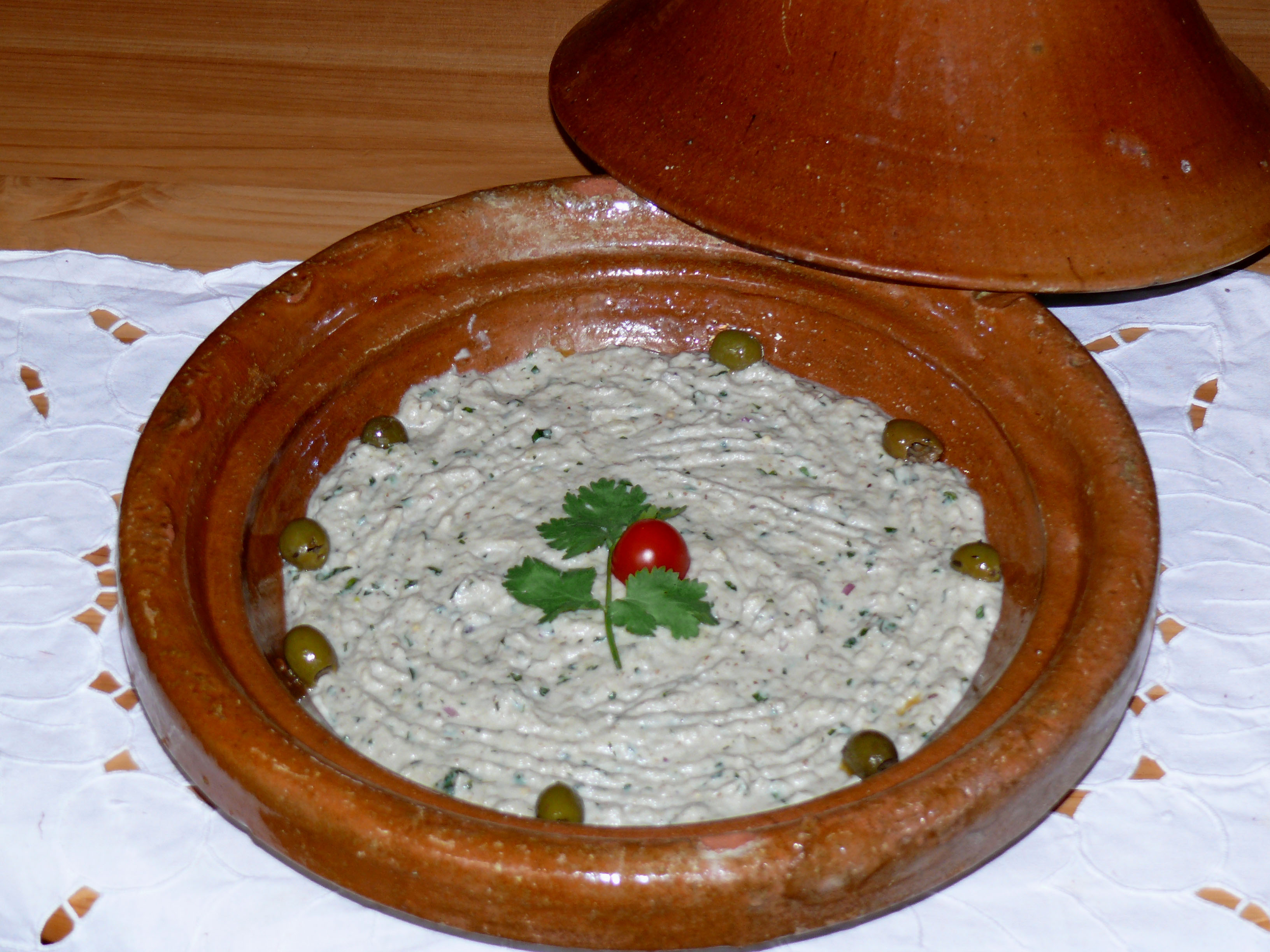
Baba ghannoug

In Egypt, meze, commonly referred to as salatat (سلطات), salads and cheeses are traditionally served at the start of a multi-course meal along with bread, before the main courses. Popular dishes include:

English	Egyptian Arabic	Description
Baba ghannoug	بابا غنوج	A dip made with eggplants, lemon juice, salt, pepper, parsley, cumin and oil.
Bedengan mekhalel	باذنجان مخلل	Pickled eggplant stuffed with a mixture of minced garlic, chili peppers, coriander, and various spices.
Duqqa	دقة	A dry mixture of pounded nuts, seeds, and spices.
Hummus	حمص	A traditional dip made from pureed chickpeas blended with tehina, olive oil, lime juice, garlic, and salt. In Egypt, it is typically prepared in a simple form, garnished with a drizzle of oil and sometimes whole chickpeas
Salata baladi	سلطة بلدي	A salad made with tomatoes, cucumber, onion, and chili, topped with parsley, cumin, coriander, vinegar, and oil.
Sobet	سُبيط	Cold cuttlefish salad
Tehina	طحينة	A sesame paste dip or spread made from ground sesame, lemon juice, and garlic.
Tomiya	ثومية	A paste made from garlic, lemon juice, oil, and salt, creating a creamy dip often served with grilled meats. The consistency of tomiya is thick, and it has a sharp, garlicky taste.
Torshi	طرشي	An assortment of pickled vegetables.

== Dishes ==
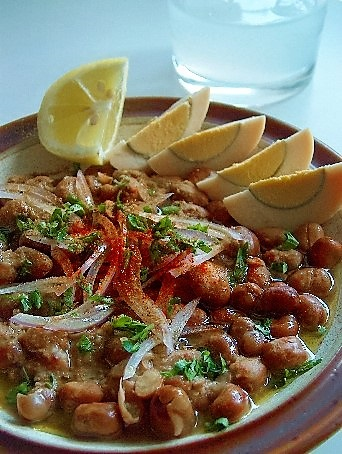
Ful medames, a breakfast dish served with hard-boiled eggs

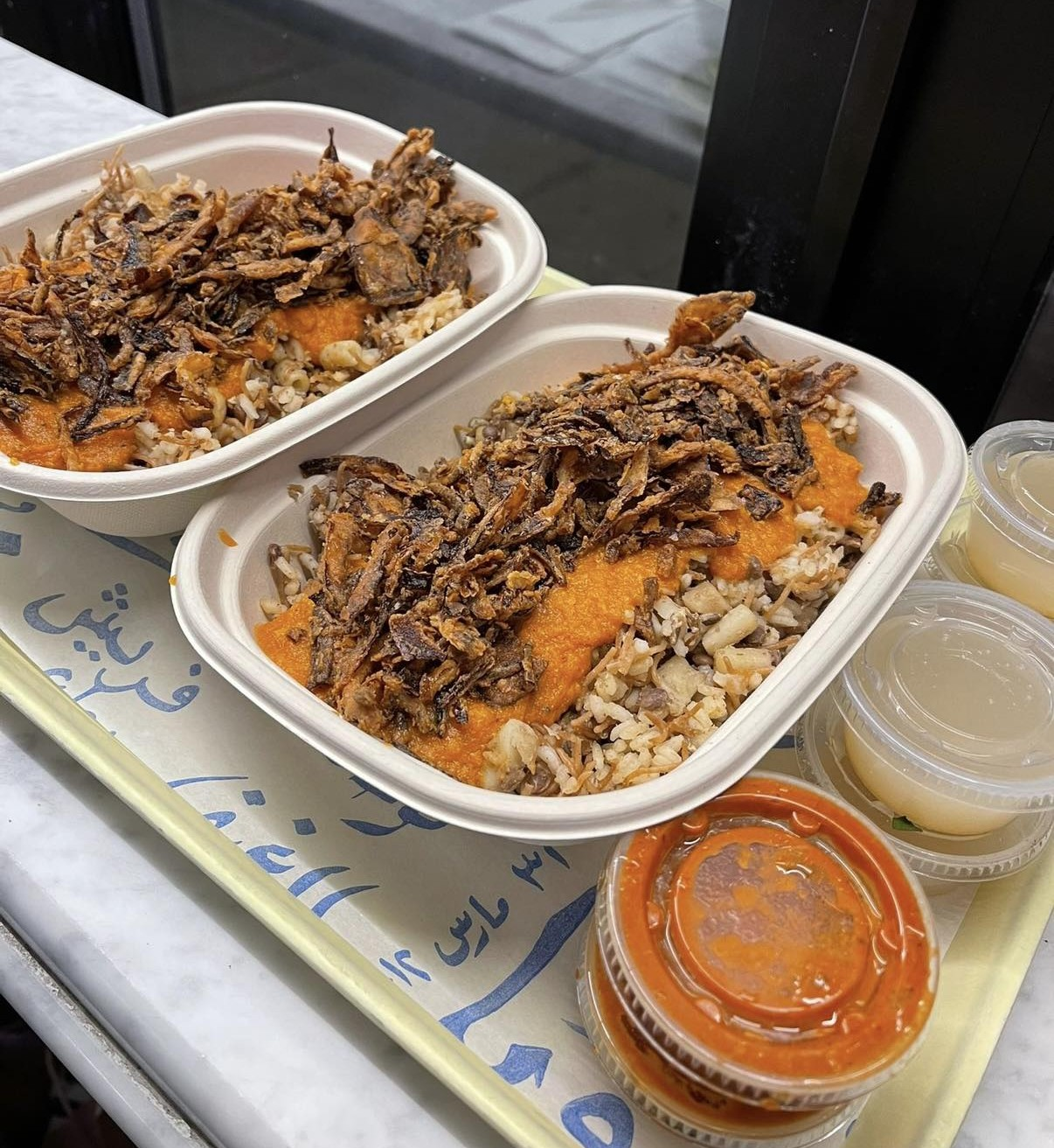
Koshary

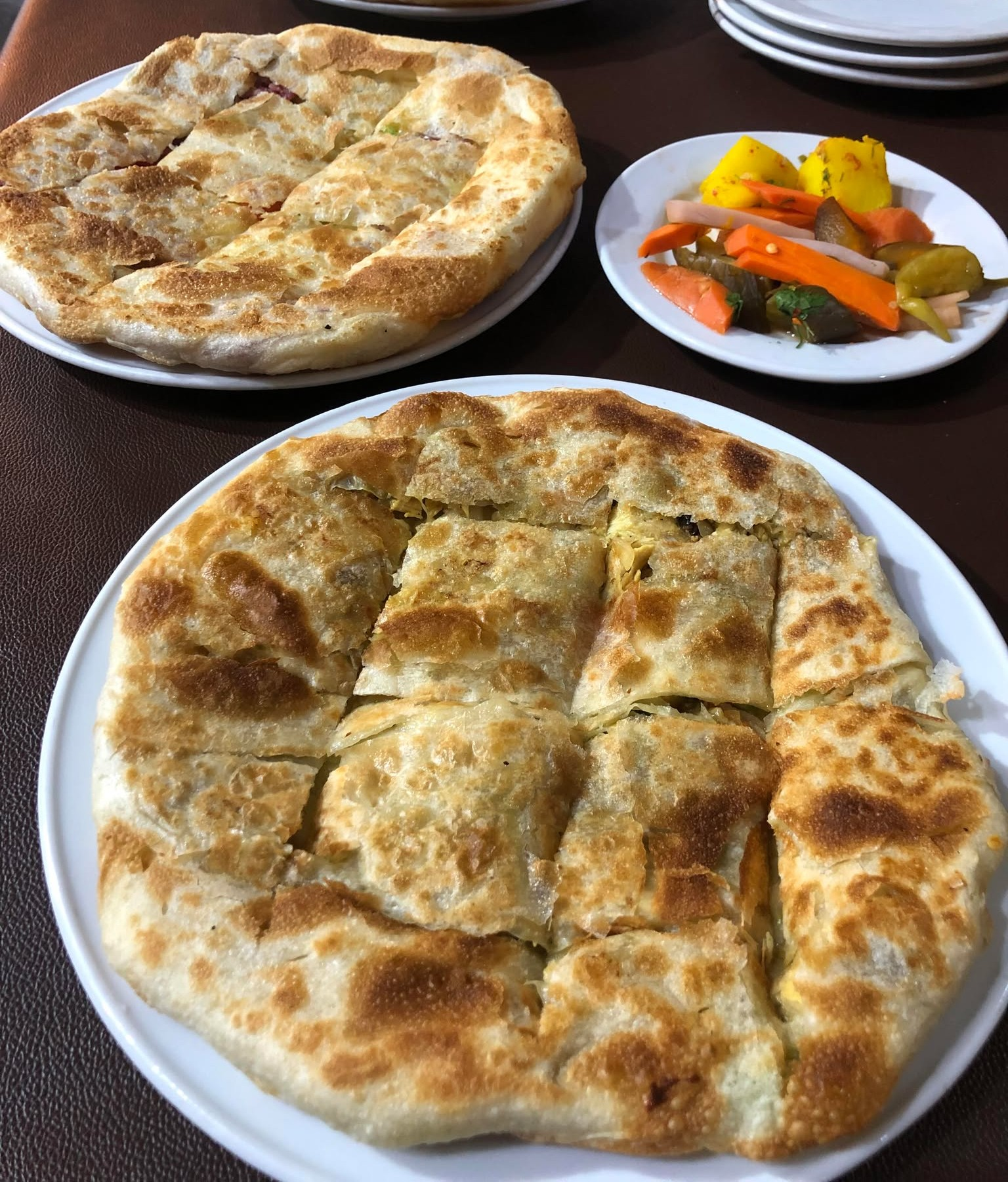
Egyptian feteer with savory fillings and a side of torshi

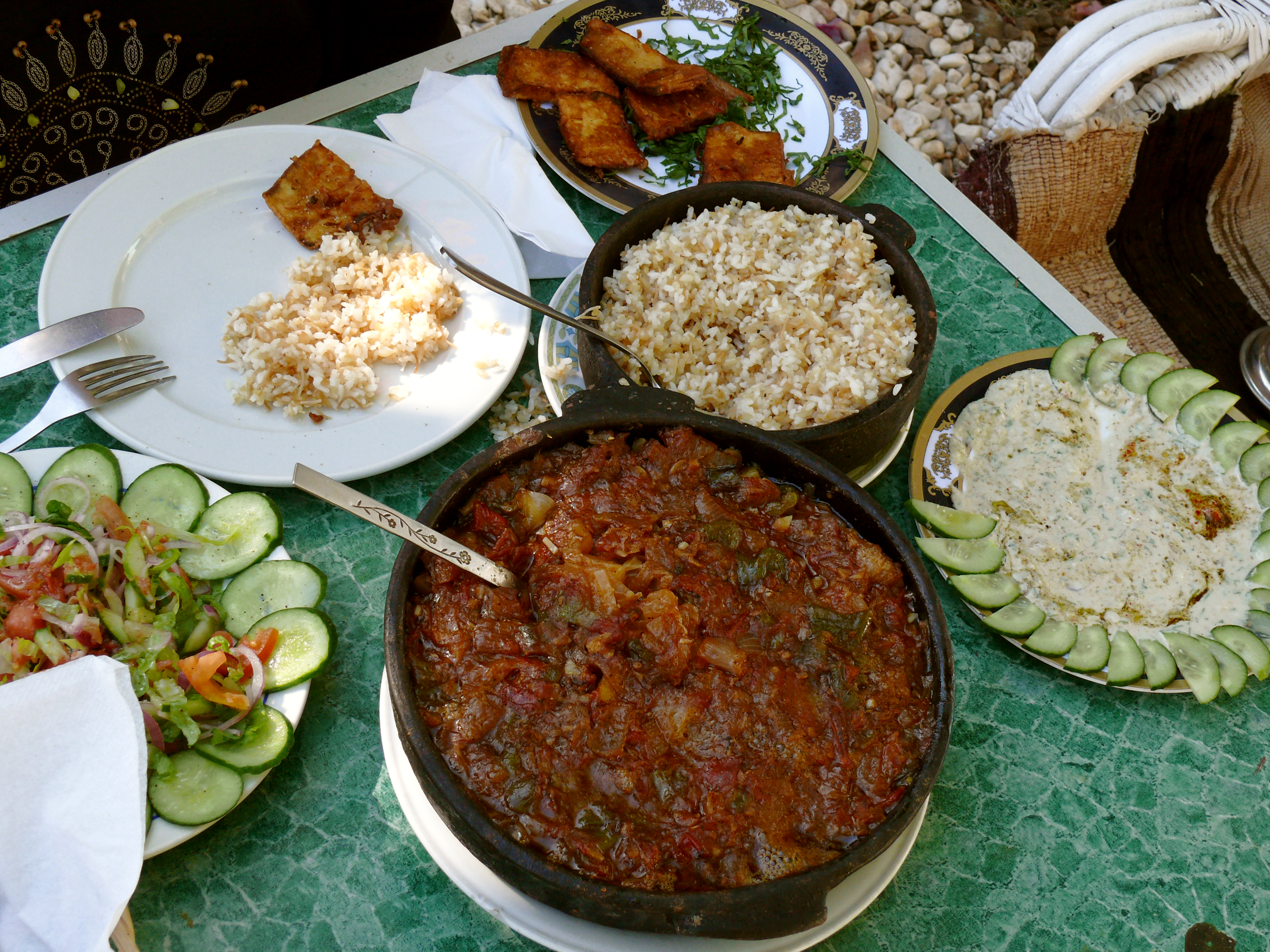
Torly, with vermicelli rice and fried eggplant

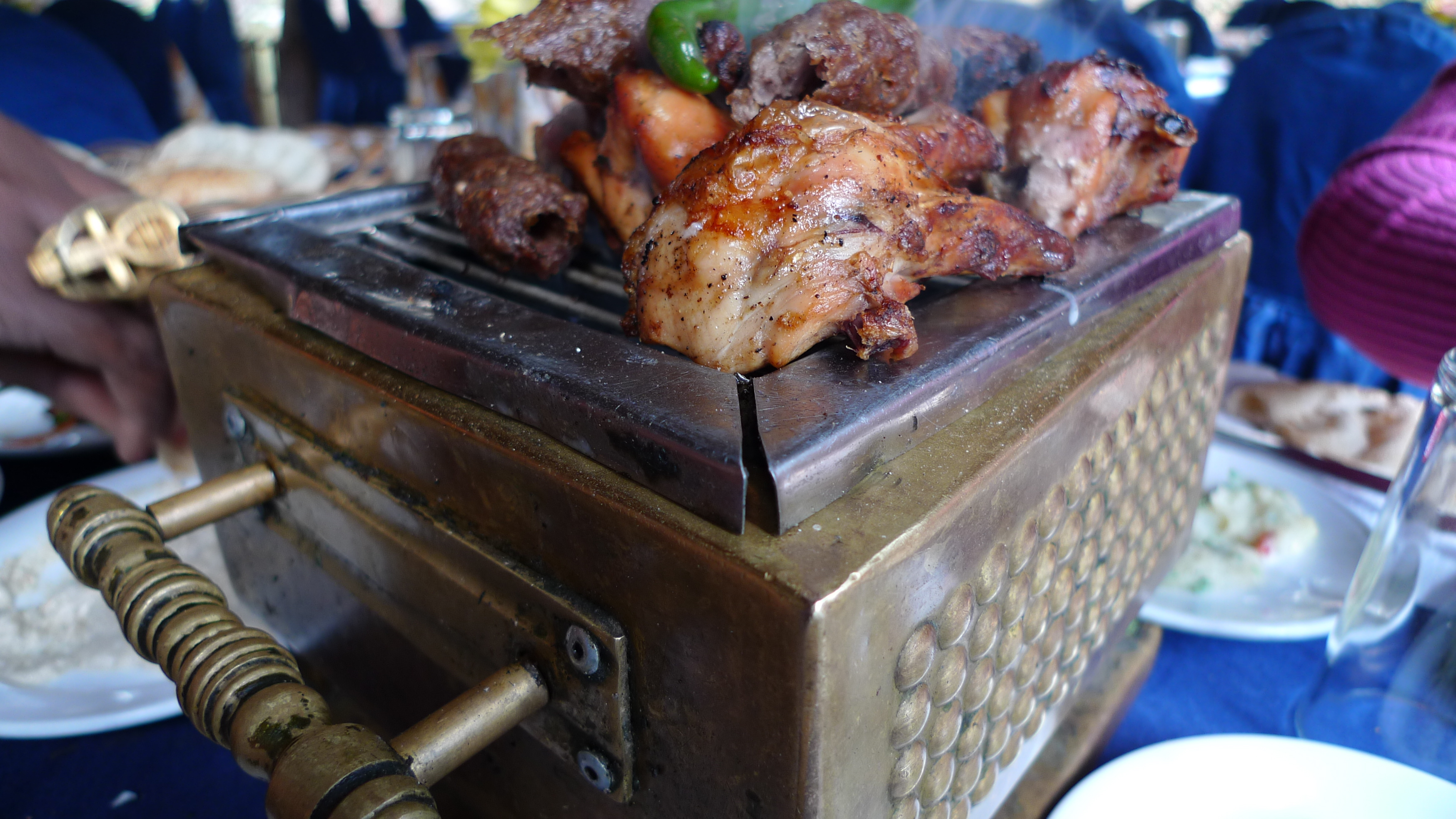
An assortment of mashwiyat, grilled meats, served on a portable grill

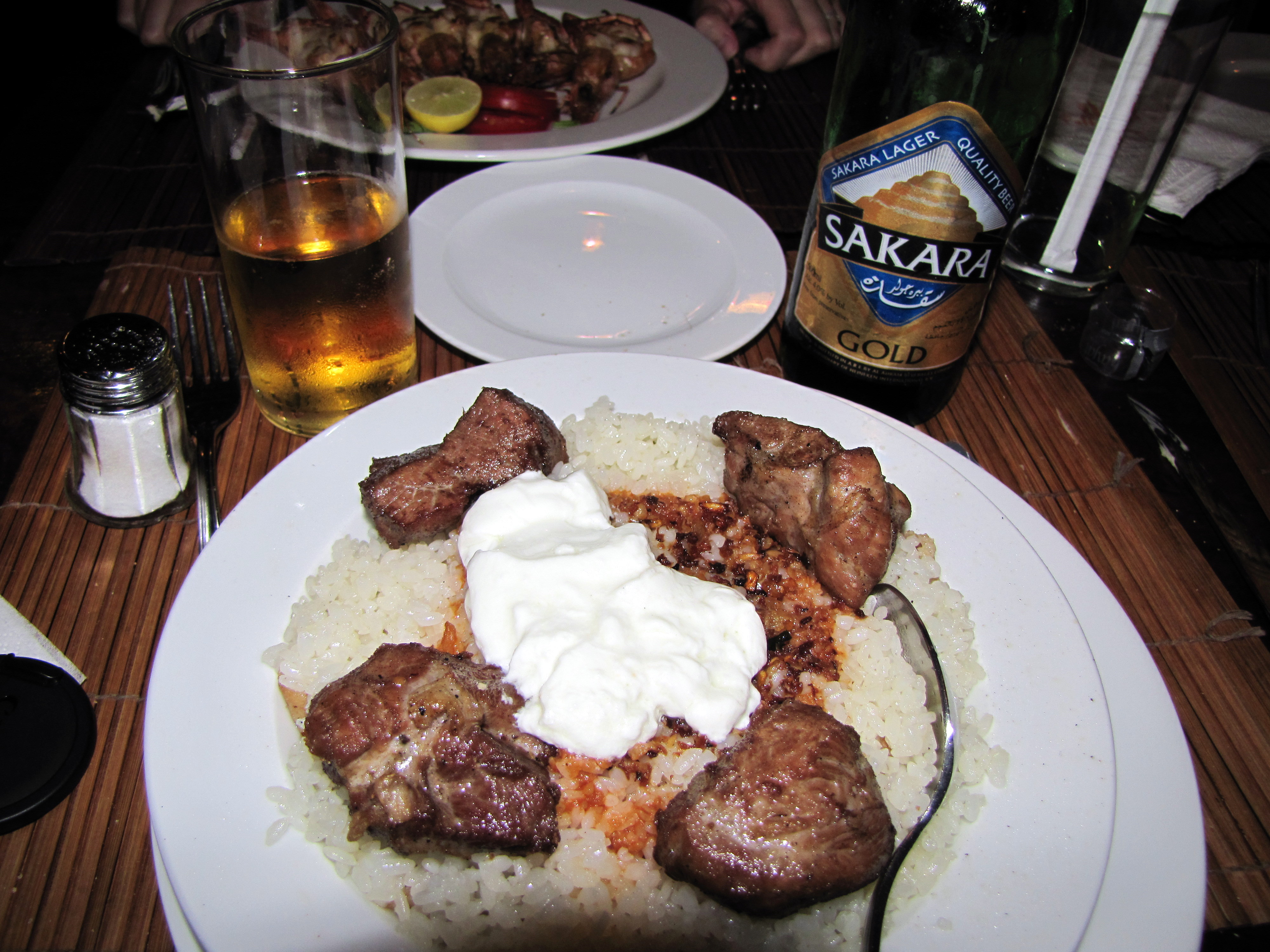
Fatta served at a Cairo restaurant

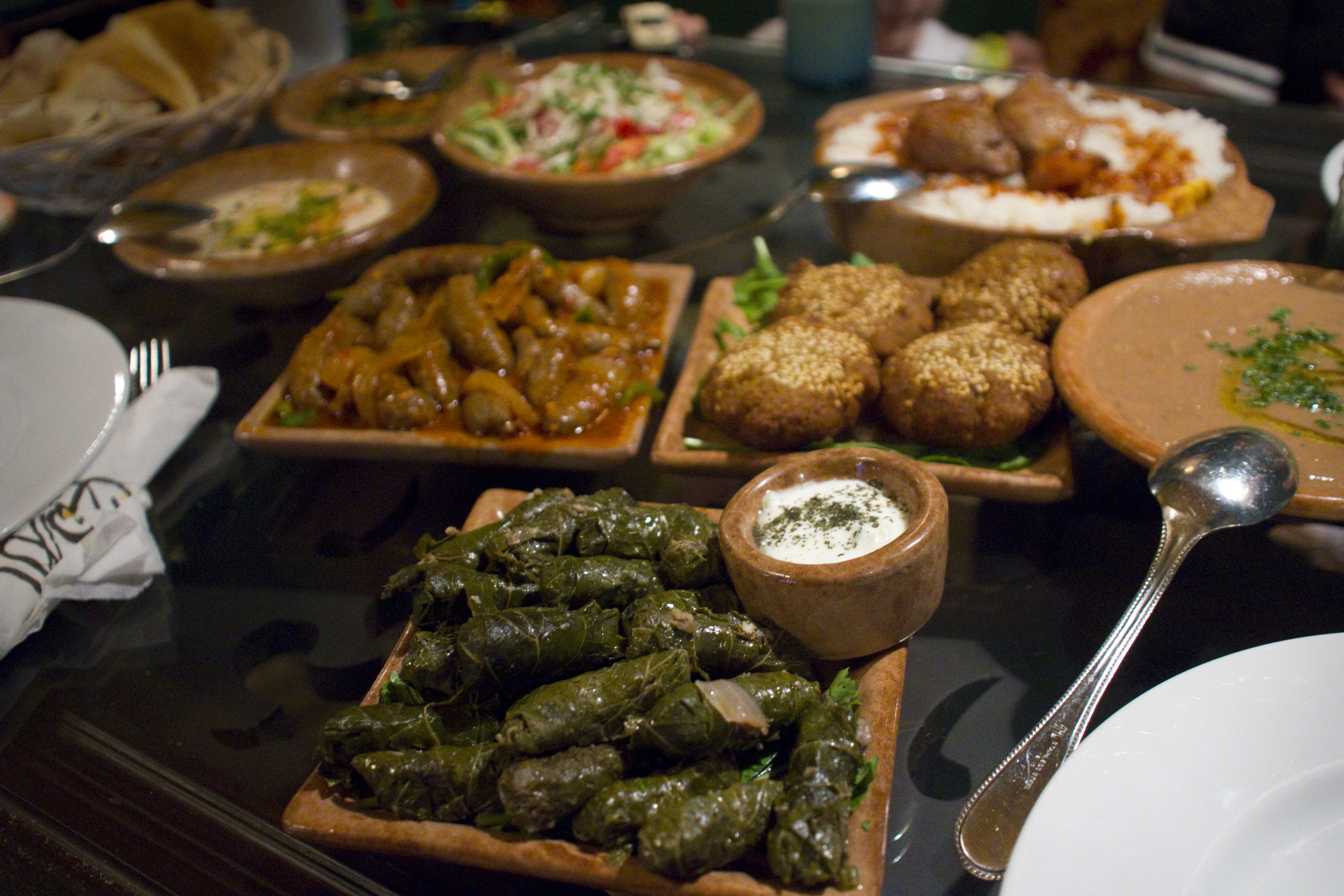
An Egyptian tablespread including mahshi waraq enab, ta‘meya, fatta and an assortment of salads

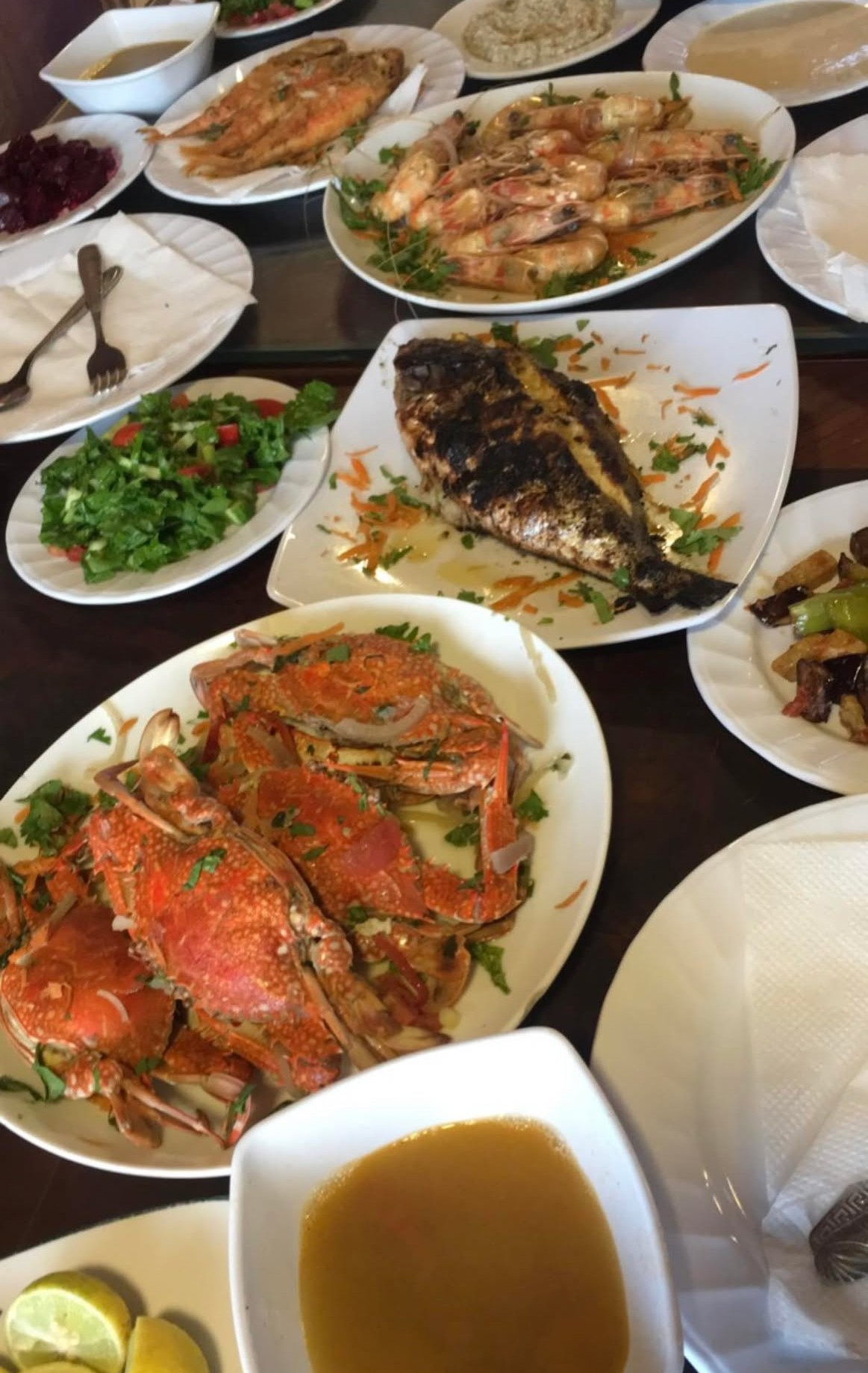
A traditional seafood tablespread at a restaurant in Alexandria

Egyptian cuisine is characterized by dishes such as ful medames, mashed fava beans; koshary, a mixture of lentils, rice, pasta, and other ingredients; molokhiya, chopped and cooked jute leaf with garlic and coriander sauce; and feteer meshaltet.

Egyptian cuisine shares similarities with food of the Eastern Mediterranean region, such as rice-stuffed vegetables, grape leaves, shawerma, kabab and kofta, with some variation and differences in preparation.

Some consider koshary, a mixture of rice, lentils, and macaroni, to be the national dish. Ful medames is also one of the most popular dishes. Fava bean is also used in making falafel (most commonly referred to as ta‘ameya in Egypt, and served with fresh tomatoes, tahina sauce and arugula).

Egyptians are known to use a lot of garlic and onions in their everyday dishes. Fresh garlic mashed with other herbs is used in spicy tomato salad and also stuffed in boiled or baked eggplant. Garlic fried with coriander is added to molokhiya, a popular green soup made from finely chopped jute leaves, sometimes with chicken or rabbit. Fried onions can be also added to koshary. The ingredients, in the okra and molokhiya dishes, are whipped and blended with a tool called the wīka, used in ancient times and today, in Egypt.

English	Egyptian Arabic	Description
Bamia	بامية	A stew prepared using lamb, okra and tomatoes as primary ingredients.
Besarah	بصارة	A dip made from peeled fava beans and leafy greens. It is served cold and is normally topped with fried onion.
‘Eggah	عجة	A type of omelette made with parsley and flour, similar to a frittata. It is baked in the oven in a deep skillet.
Fatta	فتة	A traditional dish eaten on festive occasions, particularly Eid al-Adha. A mixture of rice, chunks of lamb meat, eish baladi cut up into pieces and prebaked in the oven, all covered in a tomato or vinegar-based sauce.
Fesikh	فسيخ	Salted or fermented mullet, generally eaten on the spring festival of Sham Ennessim, which falls on Eastern Easter Monday.
Fatayer	فطاير	Savory pies typically filled with meat, spinach, or cheeses such as domiati.
Feteer	فطير	Pies made of thin dough with liberal quantities of samnah. The fillings may be either savory or sweet.
Ful medames	فول مدمس	Cooked fava beans served with olive oil and topped with cumin. It is always eaten with bread, in a sandwich or the bread is used as a utensil, to scoop up the beans. A staple in Egypt, it is often considered the national dish.
Ful nabet	فول نابت	A soup made from sprouted fava beans. The sprouted fava beans are prepared with onions, cumin, salt, black pepper, and lemon juice, in water or a broth.
Gollash	جلاش	A phyllo dough pastry stuffed with minced meat or cheese.
Hamam mahshi	حمام محشي	Pigeon stuffed with rice or green wheat and herbs. First it is boiled until cooked, then roasted or grilled.
Hawawshi	حواوشي	A turnover pastry filled with minced meat marinated in onions, pepper, parsley and sometimes hot peppers or chilies.
Kabab	كباب	Usually chopped lamb or beef meat grilled over charcoal.
Kabab halla	كباب حلة	Kabab halla is an Egyptian dish of braised beef and onions. It features stew meat cooked slowly in a small amount of stock or water until tender, with the onions breaking down into a sauce. Often considered a comfort food in Egypt, kabab halla can also include potatoes or other vegetables to enrich the stew.
Kamounia	كمونية	A beef and cumin stew. It is sometimes made with offal, like bull genitals.
Kaware‘	كوارع	Cow's trotters, it is often eaten with fattah. It is also common to boil the trotters into a broth, the tendons from the trotters and the resulting broth are enjoyed as a soup. It is believed to be an aphrodisiac in Egypt.
Kersha	كرشة	Tripe cooked into a stew.
Keshk	کشك	A yogurt-based savory pudding, made with flour, sometimes seasoned with fried onions, chicken broth or boiled chicken.
Koftet el hati	كفتة الحاتي	Minced meat prepared with spices and parsley, rolled into a finger-shape and grilled over charcoal.
Koftet rozz	كفتة أرز	Spiced meatballs made from a blend of minced meat, usually beef or camel, crushed rice, and fresh herbs, simmered in a rich, flavorful tomato-based sauce.
Koshary	كشري	An Egyptian dish originally made in the 19th century, made of rice, macaroni and lentils mixed together, topped with a spiced tomato sauce, and garlic vinegar; garnished with chickpeas and crispy fried onions. A sprinkling of garlic juice, or garlic vinegar, and hot sauce are optional. It is a popular street food.
Macarona bil-bechamel	مكرونة بشاميل	An Egyptian variant of the Italian lasagna, without the cheese. Typically consists of penne slathered in bechamel sauce with a layer of slowly fried ground beef, onions and tomato paste, topped with some more penne in bechamel sauce, topped again with a thin layer of bechamel sauce and brushed with an egg wash, then baked to perfection. Some prepare it as a variant of the Greek pastitsio, incorporating gebna rūmī, an Egyptian cheese similar to Sardo or Pecorino cheese, along with a mixture of penne macaroni and béchamel sauce, and usually two layers of cooked spiced meat with onions.
Mazalika	مزاليكا	A dish made of any combination of offal, but typically chicken gizzards, liver and heart, which are sautéed with onions, garlic, green bell peppers, and tomatoes.
Mahshi	محشي	A stuffing of rice, seasoned with crushed red tomatoes, onion, parsley, dill, salt, pepper and spices, put into vegetables like green peppers, eggplants, courgettes, tomatoes, grape or cabbage leaves. They're then placed in a pot and topped with chicken broth or beef broth.
Mesaqa‘ah	مسقعة	Sliced eggplants lightly grilled and placed in a flat pan with sliced onions, green peppers, and chili peppers. The dish is then covered with a red sauce made of tomato paste and spices then baked in the oven.
Molokhiya	ملوخية	Green soup prepared in various styles, wherein the mallow leaves are very finely chopped, with ingredients such as garlic and coriander added for a characteristic aromatic taste, then cooked with chicken broth. Other kinds of broths can be used such as rabbit, shrimp, which is popular in Alexandria, and fish in Port Said. It is often considered the country's national dish.
Mombar	ممبار	Sheep intestines stuffed with a rice mixture and deep fried in oil.
Rozz me‘ammar	رز معمر	A rice dish made by adding milk (and frequently butter or cream) and chicken stock or broth to cooked rice, then baking it in an oven. It is frequently substituted for plain white rice at festive occasions and large family meals. It is normally served in a special casserole made out of clay called bram.
Sabanekh	سبانخ	A spinach stew, usually served with rice. It is commonly, but not necessarily, made with small chunks of beef.
Sayadiya	صيادية	A coastal dish. Rice with onion cooked in tomato paste, usually served with fried fish.
Shakshouka	شكشوكة	Eggs with tomato sauce and vegetables.
Shalawlaw	شلولو	A variant of molokhiya with dried jute leaves cooked raw, with garlic, lemon and chilli in cold water.
Shawerma	شاورما	A popular sandwich of shredded beef, lamb or chicken meat, usually rolled in pita bread with tahini (sesame seed) sauce.
Shorbet 'ads	شوربة عدس	A hearty soup made with lentils, traditionally eaten in the winter.
Ta‘meya	طعمية	A breakfast dish of deep-fried fritters made out of fava beans, in contrast to the Levantine version of falafel made with chickpeas. Often eaten by themselves or in a pita bread sandwich with tehina and greens.
Torly	تورلي	A tray of baked squash, potatoes, carrots, onions, and tomato sauce.
Qolqas	قلقاس	A taro root stew, generally prepared either with chard or tomato. Unpeeled qolqas and eggplant make the ṭabkha sawda, or "black dish," served to and despised by conscripts in the Egyptian Armed Forces.

== Desserts ==
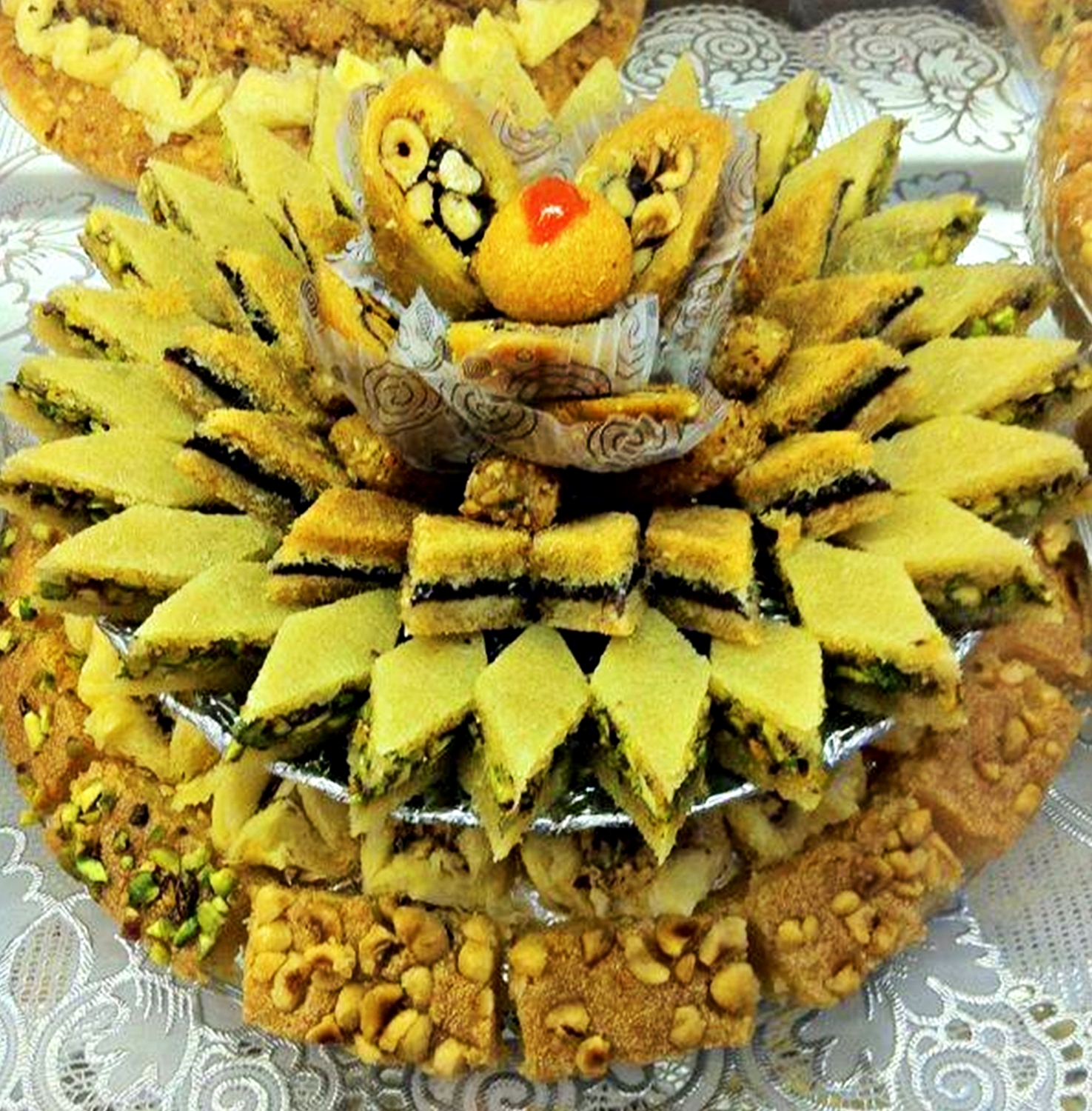
An assortment of traditional Egyptian desserts

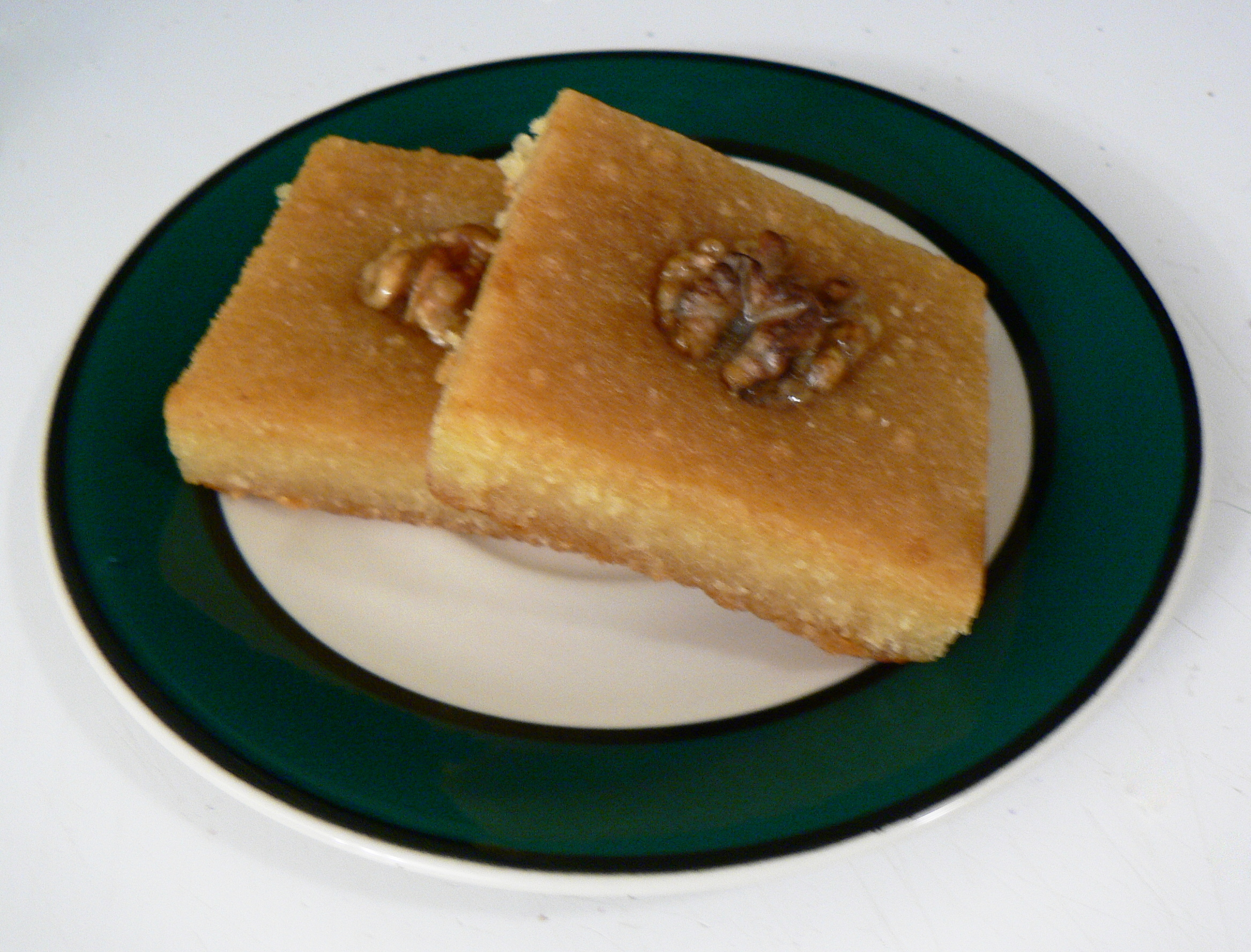
Basbousa topped with walnuts

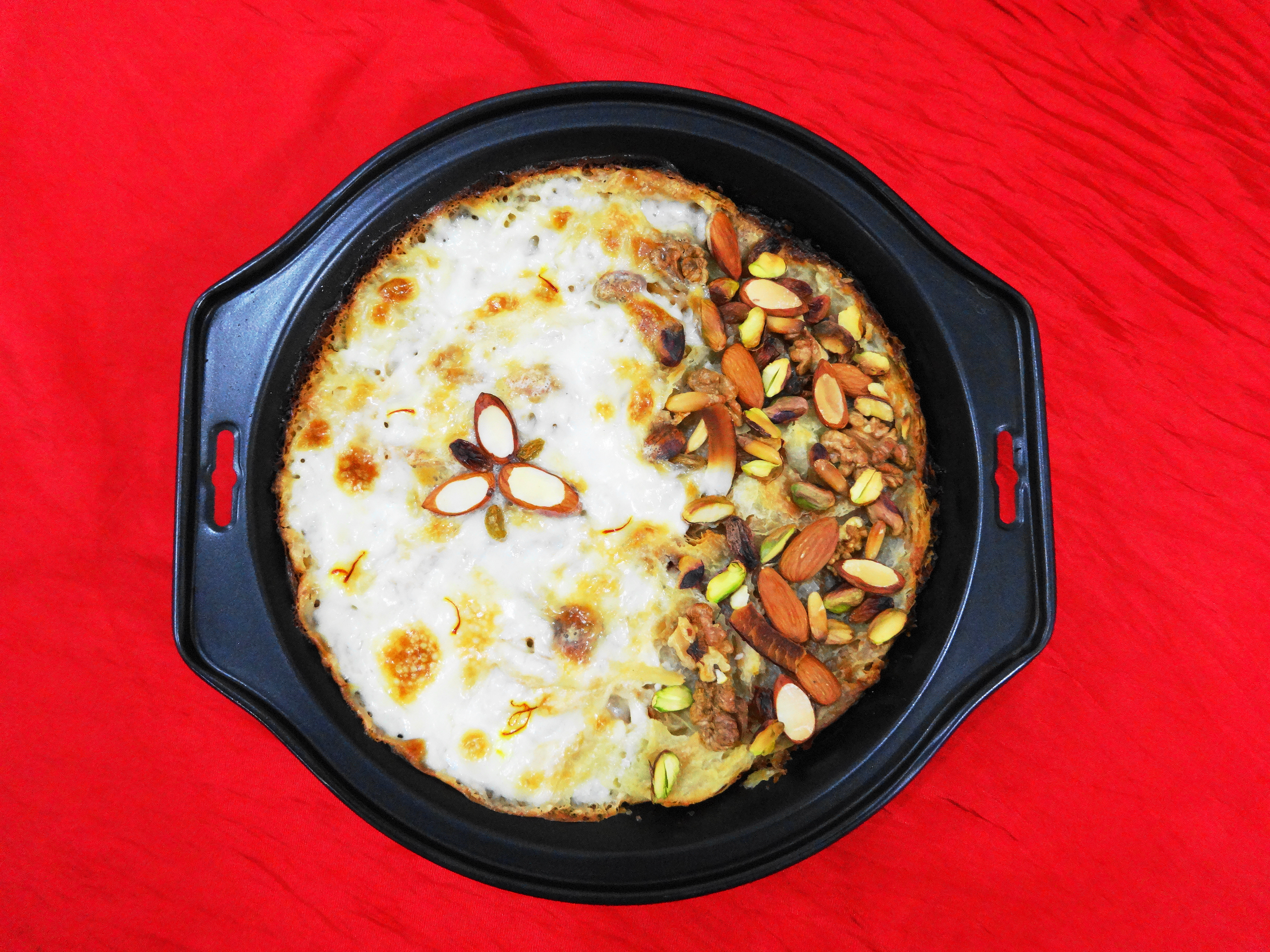
Om Ali

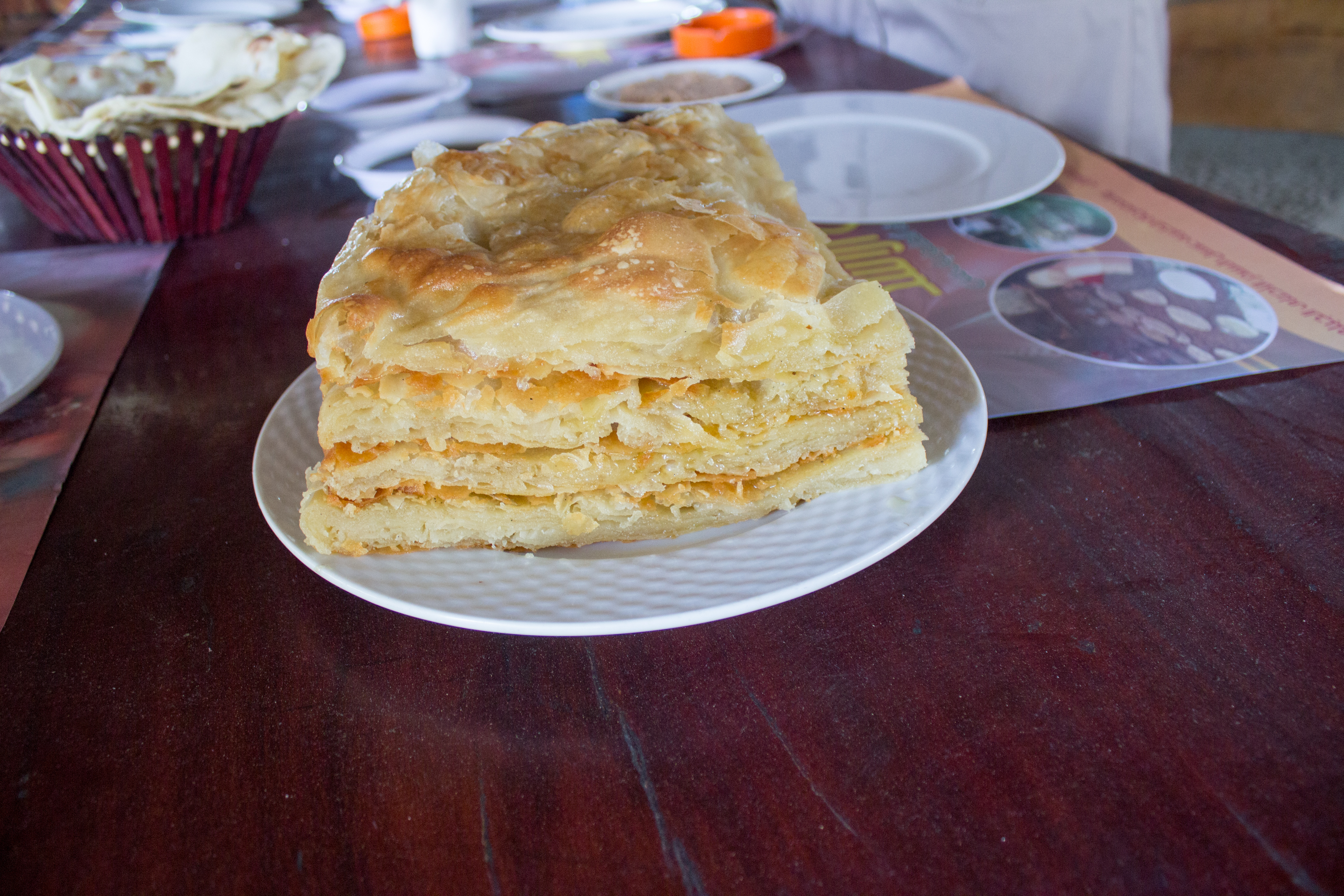
Feteer meshaltet, a pastry often eaten as a dessert by dipping in honey, molasses and eshta

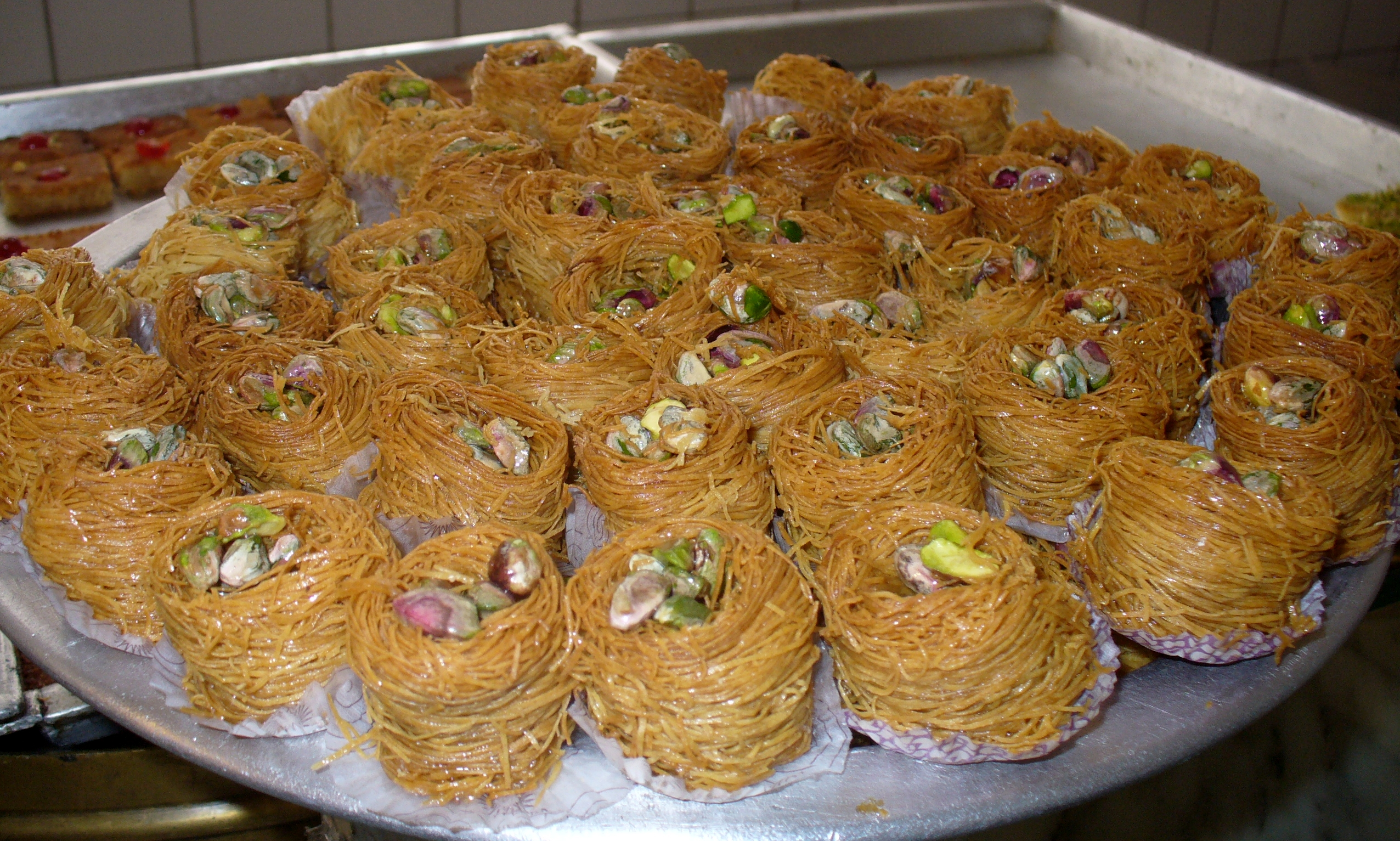
A traditional Egyptian variation of kunafa, where shredded kunafa strands encase a mixture of assorted nuts and are then soaked in sweet syrup

Egyptian desserts have evolved over millennia, influenced by the country's historical connections to various civilizations, and share a resemblance to those of the other countries in the Eastern Mediterranean. Many Egyptian desserts rely on a combination of simple yet essential ingredients. Semolina, sugar, butter, and nuts such as pistachios and almonds form the foundation of many sweets, providing both texture and depth. Syrup, often infused with rose water or orange blossom, is a defining element, adding moisture and enhancing sweetness. Dairy also plays a crucial role, with milk and eshta used in puddings and layered pastries. The use of tehina in sweets, like halawa and basbousa, adds a nutty richness, while honey, syrup and date paste are commonly incorporated for sweetness. Some popular Egyptian desserts include:

English	Egyptian Arabic	Description
Baqlawa	بقلاوة	A sweet dish made from many layers of phyllo pastry, an assortment of nuts, and soaked in a sweet syrup.
Basbousa	بسبوسة	A dessert made from semolina and soaked in syrup. It is usually topped with almonds and traditionally cut vertically into pieces so that each piece has a diamond shape.
Fakhfakhina	فخفخينا	A fruit salad that combines a variety of fresh seasonal fruits, fruit juices, and often a scoop of ice cream.
Ghorayiba	غريبة	A sweet biscuit made with sugar, flour, and liberal quantities of butter, similar to shortbread. It can be topped with roasted almonds or cloves.
Halawa	حلاوة	A popular sweet in Egypt and the Middle East made primarily from tehina paste, powdered sugar, and dry milk, often enhanced with vanilla, rosewater, or orange blossom for flavor. Commonly enjoyed as a breakfast item, snack, or dessert, it has a crumbly yet rich texture and can be eaten on its own, stuffed into pita pockets, or used as a topping. Nuts and raisins are optional additions, adding crunch and extra sweetness.
Kar' Assaly		
Kahk	كحك	A sweet biscuit served most commonly during Eid al-Fitr in Egypt. It is covered with icing sugar and can also be stuffed with dates, walnuts, or agameya (عجميه), which is similar in texture to Turkish delight, or just served plain.
Koskosi	كسكسي	Egyptian style couscous, with butter or eshta as well as sugar, nuts, and dried fruit.
Kunafa	كنافة	Refers to a variety of pastries made with thin kunafa noodle threads, often layered or wrapped around different fillings and soaked in sweet syrup. One common Egyptian variation encases a layer of eshta, resulting in a creamy texture beneath the crisp exterior. Another traditional version features kunafa strands enveloping assorted nuts, like pistachio.
Ladida	لذيذة	A traditional Egyptian candy made from shredded coconut pieces topped with hazelnuts, commonly enjoyed during Mouled El Nabawi, the celebration of Prophet Muhammad's birthday.
Masrooda	مسرودة	Dough that is cut into pieces and steamed, then soaked in melted butter, sugar, nuts, and raisins.
Malban	ملبن	An Egyptian confection made from a base of sugar, water, and starch, infused with fragrant ingredients like rosewater, orange blossom water, and sometimes mastic resin or fruit extracts. Often dusted with powdered sugar or rolled in chopped nuts, this treat is a staple in festive celebrations such as Eid and Ramadan.
Mefatt'ah	مفتأه	A thick paste made from sesame and molasses.
Mehalabeya	مهلبية	A creamy milk pudding thickened with vanilla and either cornstarch or rice flour.
Melabbes	ملبس	Sugar-coated almond dragees.
Loqmet el qadi	لقمة القاضي	Small, round donuts that are crunchy on the outside and soft and syrupy on the inside. They are often served with dusted cinnamon and powdered sugar. The name literally translates to "The Judge's Bite".
Om Ali	ام علي	A type of bread pudding served hot, made with puff pastry or rice, milk, coconut, and raisins.
Rozz be-laban	ارز بلبن	A rice pudding made with short-grain white rice, full-cream milk, sugar, and vanilla. It can be served dusted with cinnamon, nuts, and ice cream.
Sad el hanak	سد الحنك	A dessert, typically consumed during the winter. The name, meaning "Clogging of the mouth", refers to its dense texture, which is achieved by cooking flour in a mixture of sugar and butter. The dish is often topped with coconut or nuts. It is commonly served as a dessert after meals, particularly in family settings.
Sawabe‘ Zeinab	صوابع زينب	A dessert made from a dough of flour, semolina, ghee, and yeast that’s shaped into small finger-like pieces, deep-fried until golden, and soaked in a sugar syrup. Crunchy on the outside and soft inside, the sweet is especially popular during Ramadan and Eid celebrations.
Qatayef	قطايف	A dessert served exclusively during the month of Ramadan, a sort of sweet mini pancake (made without eggs) filled with cream and nuts or raisins.

== Cuisine and religious practice ==
=== Muslims ===
Although Ramadan is a month of fasting for Muslims in Egypt, it is usually a time when Egyptians pay a lot of attention to food variety and richness, since breaking the fast is a family affair, often with entire extended families meeting at the table just after sunset. There are several desserts served almost exclusively during Ramadan, such as kunafa (كنافة) and qatayef (قطايف). In this month, many Egyptians prepare a special table for the poor or passers-by, usually in a tent in the street, called Ma’edet er-Raḥmān (Arabic: مائدة الرحمن, [mæˈʔedet ɑrɾɑħˈmɑːn], which literally translates to "Table of the Merciful", referring to one of the 99 names of God in Islam. These may be fairly simple or quite lavish, depending on the wealth and ostentation of the provider.

Egypt’s largest such communal Ramadan table is held annually on the 15th of Ramadan in Cairo’s Matareya district. Established in 2013 and funded by local contributions, the event has evolved into a major cultural tradition, attracting thousands of attendees, including government officials, celebrities, athletes, and foreign ambassadors.

=== Coptic Christians ===
Observant Christians in Egypt adhere to fasting periods according to the Coptic calendar; these may practically extend to more than two-thirds of the year for the most observant. The more secular Coptic population mainly fasts only for Easter and Christmas. The Coptic diet for fasting is essentially vegan. During this fasting, Copts usually eat vegetables and legumes fried in oil and avoid meat, chicken, eggs and dairy products, including butter and cream.

Christian fasting culture in Egypt has been historically shaped by monastic traditions, dating back to the early centuries of Christianity. Monks and nuns adhered to periods of strict fasting, consuming primarily bread, salt, and water, though their diets included a variety of plant-based foods. Meals were often communal, consisting of cheese (outside fasting periods), pickles, greens, olives, and cooked or raw vegetables. Lentils and other pulses, such as chickpeas, were common staples, along with vegetables like onions, garlic, cabbage, and mallows. A range of oils, including olive oil, linseed oil, and sesame oil, was used, while vinegar was primarily for preserving food. Fruits such as figs, grapes, and dates were consumed both fresh and dried.

== Beverages ==
=== Tea ===
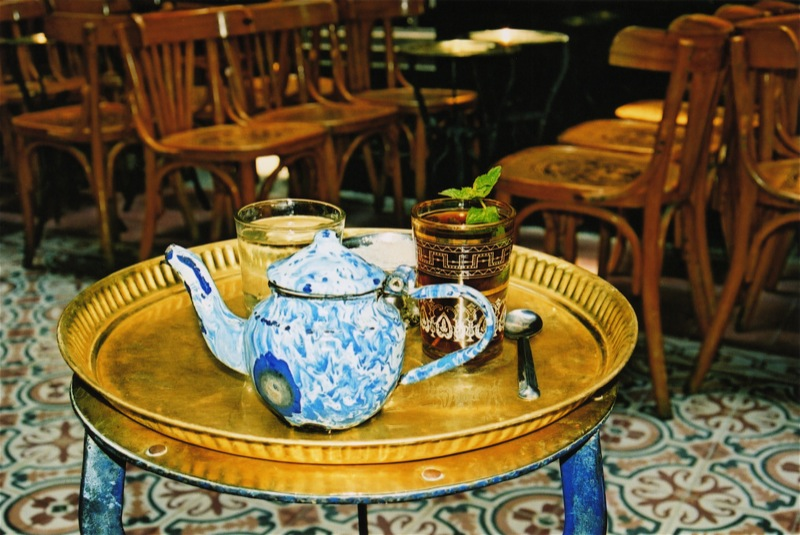
Egyptian mint tea

Tea (شاي, shai [ʃæːj]) is the national drink in Egypt, followed only distantly by coffee. Egyptian tea is uniformly black and sour and is generally served in a glass, sometimes with milk to make shai bi-laban (شاي بلبن). Tea packed and sold in Egypt is almost exclusively imported from Kenya and Sri Lanka. Egyptian tea comes in two varieties, koshari and sa‘idi.

Koshari tea (شاي كشري), popular in Lower Egypt, is prepared using the traditional method of steeping black tea in boiled water and letting it sit for a few minutes. It is almost always sweetened with cane sugar and often flavored with fresh mint leaves. Koshari tea is usually light in color and flavor, with less than a half teaspoonful of tea per cup considered to be near the high end.

Sa‘idi tea (شاي صعيدي) is drunk in Upper Egypt and among Sa'idi people elsewhere. It is prepared by boiling black tea with water for as long as five minutes over a strong flame. Sa‘idi tea is extremely strong and dark ("heavy" in Egyptian parlance), with two teaspoonfuls of tea per cup being the norm. It is sweetened with copious amounts of cane sugar (a necessity since the formula and method yield a very bitter tea). Sa‘idi tea is often black even in liquid form.

Tea is a vital part of daily life and folk etiquette in Egypt. It typically accompanies breakfast in most households, and drinking tea after lunch is a common practice. Visiting another person's household, regardless of socioeconomic level or the purpose of the visit, entails a compulsory cup of tea; similar hospitality might be required for a business visit to the private office of someone wealthy enough to maintain one, depending on the nature of the business. A common nickname for tea for visitors in Egypt is "duty" (pronounced in Egyptian Arabic as "wageb"), as serving tea to a visitor is considered a duty, while anything beyond is a nicety.

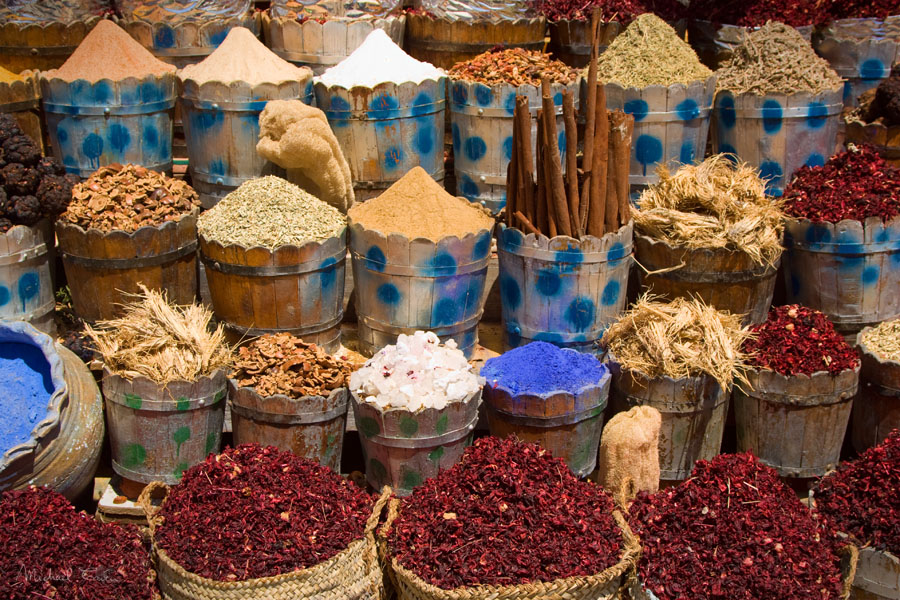
Hibiscus and other herbs in Hurghada

Besides true tea, herbal teas are also often served at Egyptian teahouses. Karkadeh (كركديه), a tea of dried hibiscus sepals, is particularly popular, as it is in other parts of North Africa. It is generally served extremely sweet and cold but may also be served hot. This drink is said to have been a preferred drink of the pharaohs. In Egypt and Sudan, wedding celebrations are traditionally toasted with a glass of hibiscus tea. On a typical street in downtown Cairo, one can find many vendors and open-air cafés selling the drink. In Egypt, karkadeh is used as a means to lower blood pressure when consumed in high amounts. Infusions of mint, cinnamon, dried ginger, and anise are also common, as is sahlab. Most of these herbal teas are considered to have medicinal properties as well; particularly common is an infusion of hot lemonade in which mint leaves have been steeped and sweetened with honey and used to combat mild sore throat.

=== Coffee ===
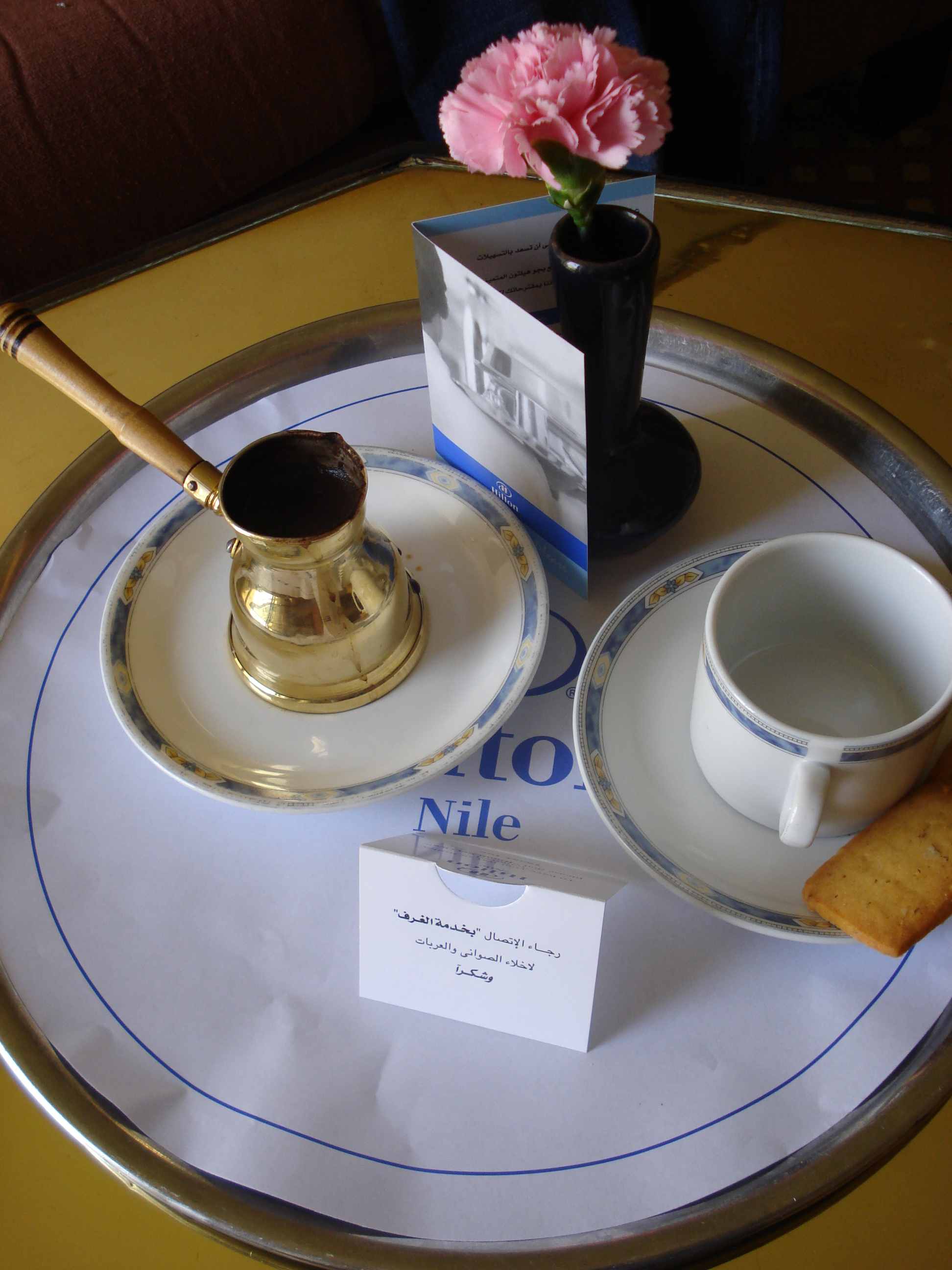
Coffee served in Cairo

Coffee (قهوة, ahwa Arabic: [ˈʔæhwæ]) is considered a part of the traditional welcome in Egypt. It is usually prepared in the Turkish style in a small coffee pot, which is called kanakah (كنكه) and served in a small coffee cup called a fengan (فنجان). The coffee is usually strong and sweetened with sugar to various degrees; 'aal riha (عال ريحه), mazbout (مضبوط) and ziyada (زيادة) respectively, while unsweetened is sada (ساده).

=== Juices ===
In Egypt, sugar cane juice is called 'asir asab (عصير قصب) and is a popular drink served by many fruit juice vendors, who can be found abundantly in most cities.

Erq sous, a licorice juice, and kharob, a juice made from carob pods, are traditionally enjoyed during the Islamic month of Ramadan, as is amar eddin, a thick drink made by reconstituting sheets of dried apricot with water. The sheets themselves are often consumed as candy. Sobia (سوبيا) is another beverage traditionally served cold. It is a sweet coconut milk drink, usually sold cold by shops .

A sour, chilled drink made from tamarind is popular during the summer called tamr hindi (تمر هندي). It literally translates to "Indian dates", which is the Arabic name for tamarind.

=== Alcoholic beverages ===
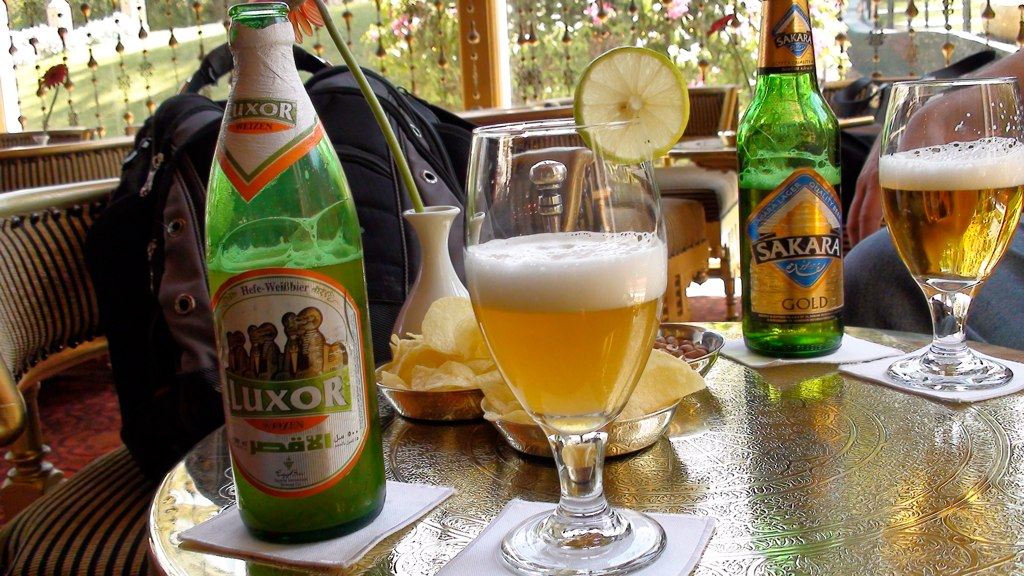
A bottle of Luxor Weizen, a wheat beer from the Luxor brand brewed by Egybev, and a bottle of Sakara Gold

Islam is the majority religion in Egypt, and while observant Muslims tend to avoid the consumption of alcohol, it is readily available in the country. Beer is by far the most popular alcoholic beverage in the country, accounting for 54 percent of all alcohol consumed.

A beer type known as bouza (Arabic: بوظة), based on barley and bread, has been drunk in Egypt since beer first made its appearance in the country, possibly as early as the Predynastic era. It is not the same as boza, an alcoholic beverage found in Turkey and the Balkans.

Egypt has a small but nascent wine industry. Egyptian wines have received some recognition in recent years, having won several international awards. In 2013, Egypt produced 4,500 tonnes of wine, ranking 54th globally, ahead of Belgium and the United Kingdom. Most Egyptian wines are made with grapes sourced from vineyards in Alexandria and Middle Egypt, most notably Gianaclis winery.

== Food establishments ==
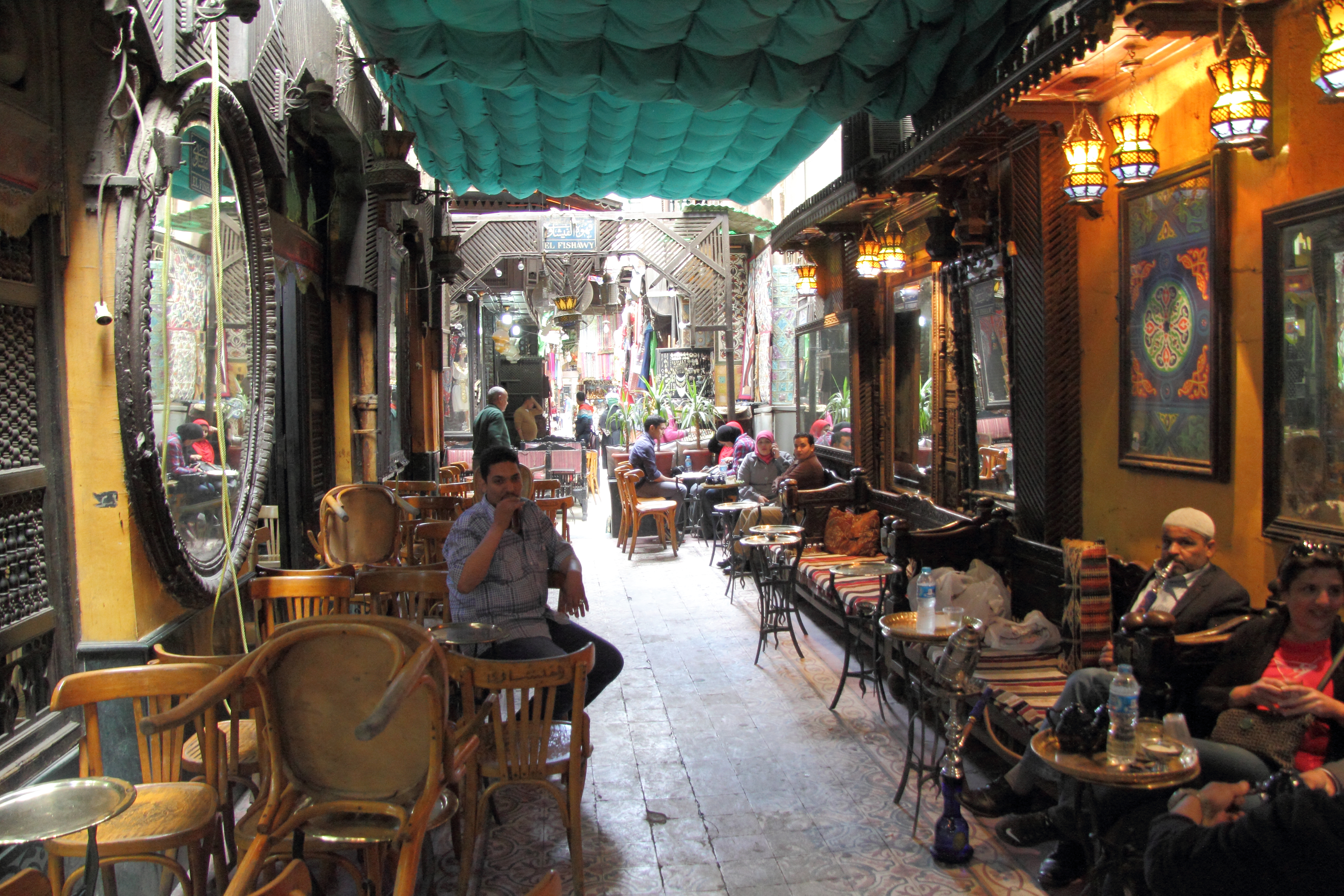
An ahwa in Cairo

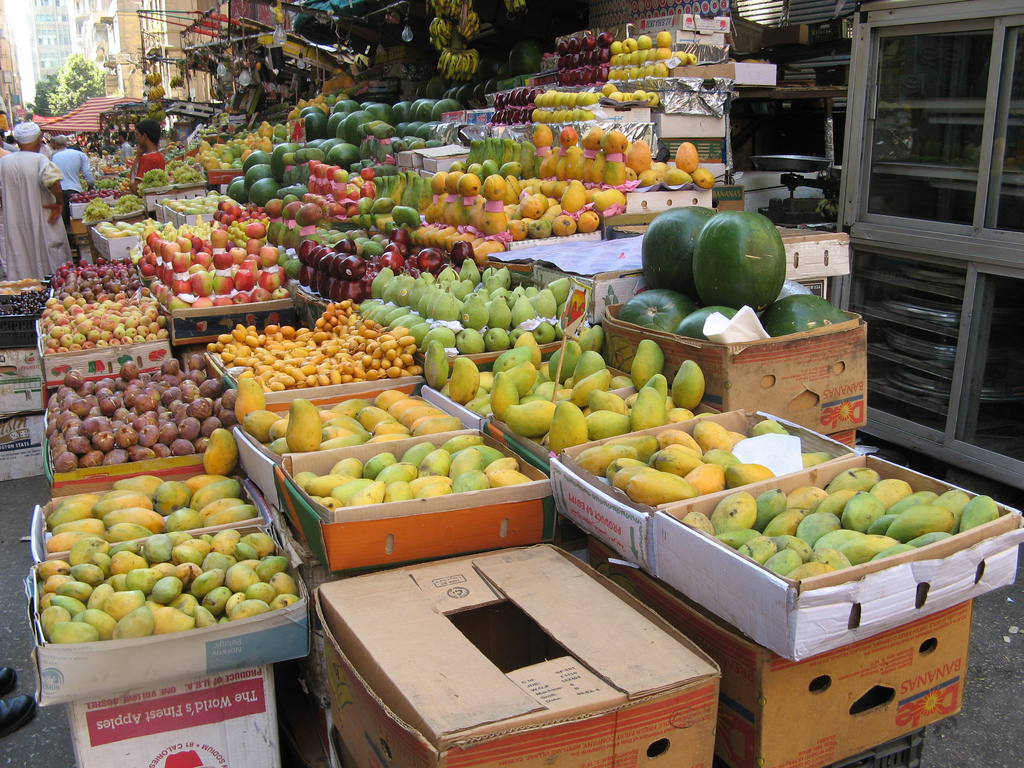
Fakahani

Egypt has a variety of traditional food and drink establishments serving unique specialties, from casual coffeehouses and dive bars to bakeries, fruit vendors, and modern cafés.

English	Egyptian Arabic	Description
Ahwa	قهوة	Traditional Egyptian coffeehouses, they are a long-standing social institution in Egypt. Traditionally male-dominated but now frequented by all genders, particularly in cities. These establishments are places to drink tea and Turkish-style coffee, discuss politics, and relax, with shisha (شيشة) as a popular feature. Ahwas serve a range of traditional beverages, including karkadeh (كركديه), a chilled hibiscus beverage; and limoon (ليمون), a type of lemonade, sometimes with mint, in the summer; and sahlab (سحلب), hilba (حلبة), and yansoon (ينسون), aniseed tea, in the winter.
Baladi bar	بار بلدي	A baladi bar is an Egyptian equivalent of a dive bar, small, unpretentious, and popular among locals. Often modest and timeworn, these establishments primarily serve cheap, cold beer rather than food, offering a no-frills drinking experience. They play a significant role in the working-class social scene, particularly in major cities like Cairo and Alexandria.
Fakahani	فكهاني	A fruit vendor or shop specializing in selling fresh fruits.
Fasakhani	فسخاني	A shop specializing in the production and sale of fesikh.
Furn	فرن	Small neighborhood bakeries that typically specialize in staple breads such as eish baladi and eish fino, as well as other baked goods.
Halawani	حلواني	A confectioner or bakery specializing in traditional Egyptian sweets and desserts. Many pastry shops in Egypt include "halawani" in their names to indicate that they specialize in sweets.
Kafeeh	كافيه	An Egyptian pronunciation of "café", referring to a modern-style coffeehouse, more similar to those found in other countries, often serving pastries, cakes, baked goods, espresso-based beverages, and other modern coffee preparation styles.
Mahal ʿasir	محل عصير	Juice shops specializing in freshly squeezed fruit juices, popular in Egypt, especially in hot weather. Recognizable by the netted bags of fruit hanging outside, these shops offer a variety of options, including banana, guava, lemon, mango, orange, pomegranate, strawberry, and sugarcane.
Makhbaz	مخبز	A general term for a bakery, sometimes interchangeable with furn, though it may also include places that make a wider variety of baked goods.
Matʿam	مطعم	A general term for restaurant, ranging from small eateries to upscale dining establishments, which may serve either Egyptian or international cuisine.

== Minority cuisines in Egypt ==
=== Bedouins ===
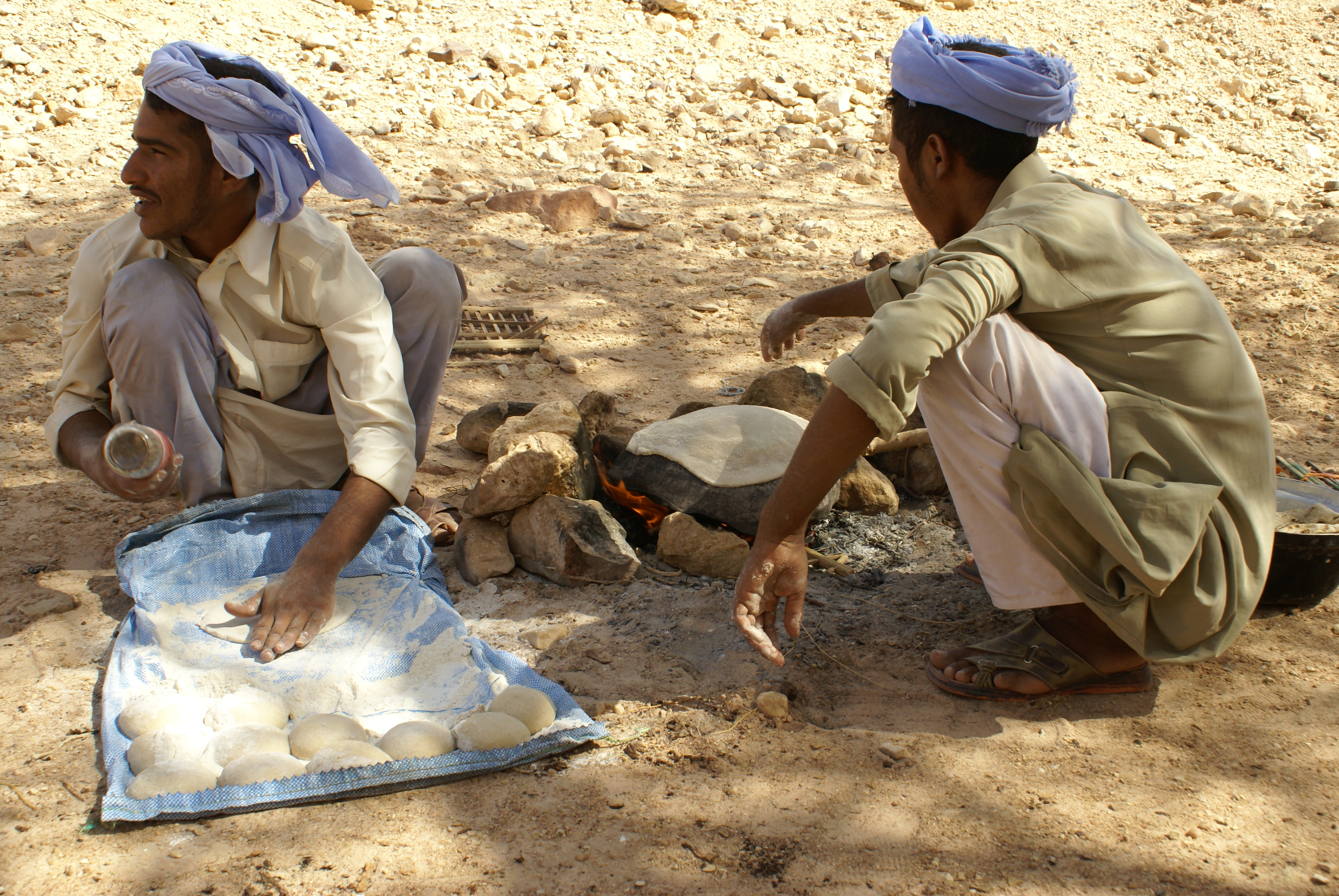
Traditional Bedouin bread baking

Bedouin cuisine in Egypt is deeply intertwined with their nomadic lifestyle, emphasizing the use of livestock such as camels and goats, which are essential for food, clothing, and other needs. Camels provide vital resources, including milk, which is highly nutritious, while goats supply meat, milk, cheese, and skins, fulfilling a significant portion of Bedouins' dietary requirements. Sheep are also important, though cows are typically avoided due to their high maintenance needs. This reliance on livestock is central to Bedouin cooking practices.

=== Nubians ===
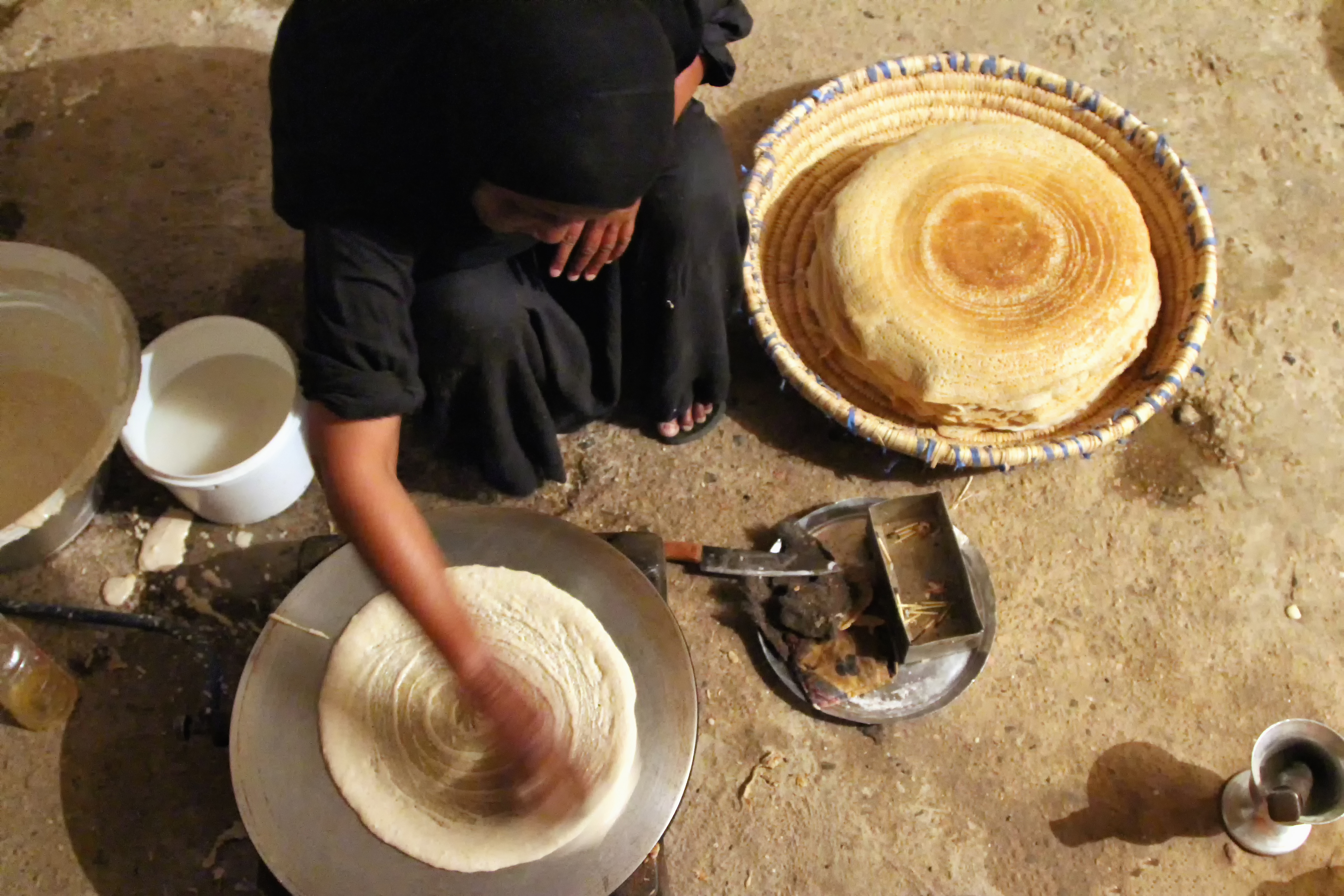
Traditional Nubian kabed bread baking

Nubian food encompasses a distinct yet related culinary tradition developed by Nubians in southern Egypt, especially in the Nubian villages surrounding Aswan. Deeply rooted in the agricultural practices of the Nile Valley, Nubian cooking primarily utilizes locally cultivated crops such as barley, sorghum, and wheat. Bread, central to Nubian meals, has origins tracing back thousands of years, as archaeological findings at sites like Kerma illustrate. A common traditional bread, kabed (كابد), is prepared by mixing corn flour with water to form dough, which is then baked until crispy at the edges yet remains soft inside. Nubians typically enjoy kabed with milk, honey, vegetables, or meat.

Traditional Nubian kitchens typically feature simple cooking implements, including mud hearths, clay water coolers, and utensils crafted from mud or glass. Ingredients commonly grown along the Nile, such as okra, zucchini, spinach, peas, beans, and carrots, form the basis of many Nubian dishes. Despite sharing many dishes with other parts of Egypt they are typically distinguished by the use of specific local herbs and spices. One notable Nubian specialty is raw camel liver, seasoned with onions marinated in vinegar, chili sauce, cumin, and coriander, traditionally consumed raw and valued for its nutritional benefits. Nubian recipes also frequently incorporate chicken and fish.

Many traditional Nubian dishes are characterized by their simplicity and local sourcing, yet several face extinction due to social changes and environmental factors. One example is nolo madid (نولو مديد), a porridge-like dish prepared from wheat flour, ghee, water, and optionally milk or molasses, traditionally associated with pre-wedding ceremonies by the Nile. The shift from pottery to metal cookware has further threatened traditional cooking practices.

== See also ==
- Culture of Egypt
- Ancient Egyptian cuisine
- Arab cuisine
- North African cuisine
- Mediterranean cuisine
- List of African cuisines
- List of Asian cuisines
