= Kadayif (pastry) =

Middle Eastern dessert

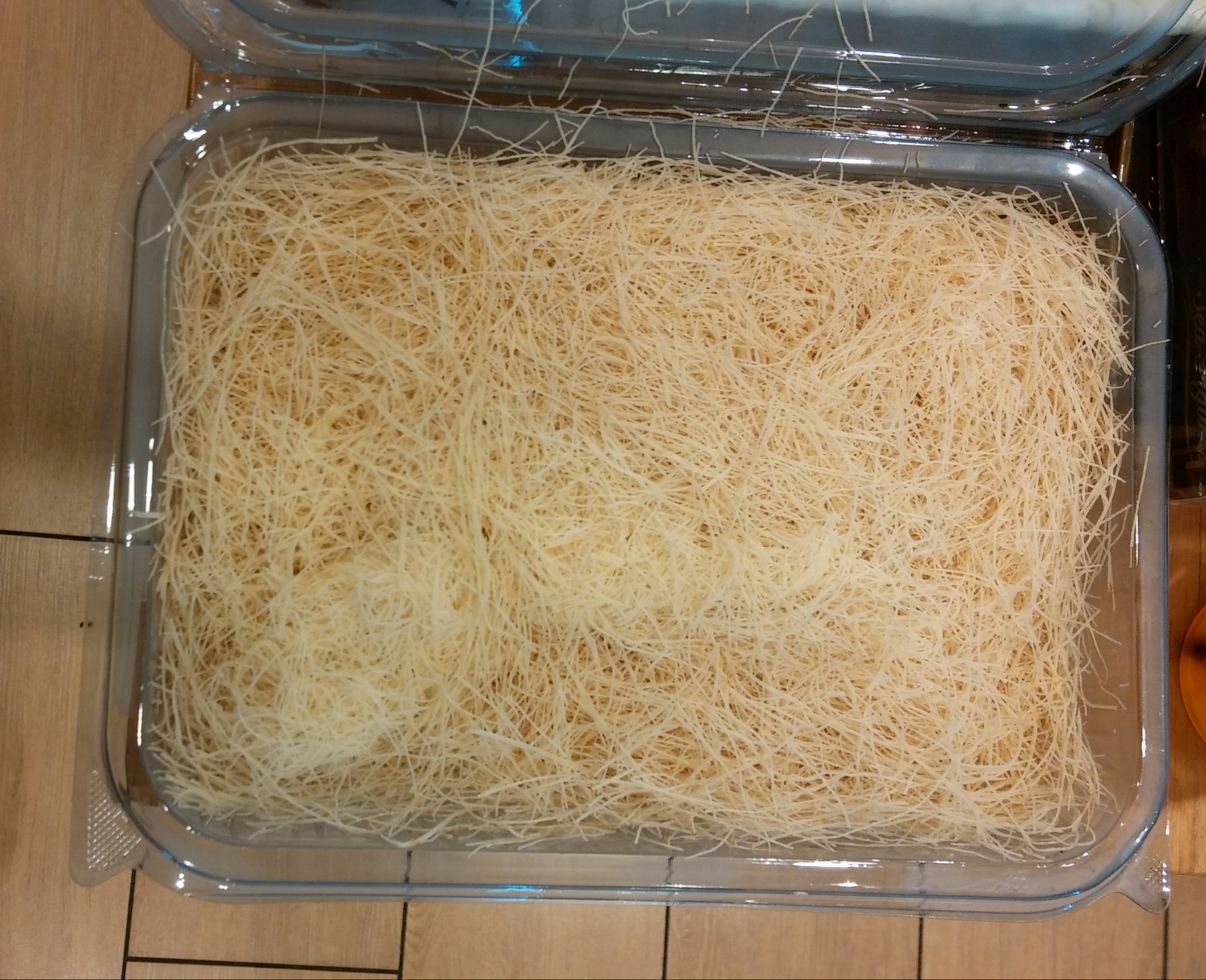
- Kadayif strings in a bakery
- Alternative names: Kadayıf; Kadaifi; Kataifi; Cataife
- Type: Dessert,Pastry
- Place of origin: Middle East
- Associated cuisine: Levantine, Balkanic, Arabic, Turkish, Greek, Armenian
- Serving temperature: Warm
- Main ingredients: Filo pastry strips; Milled almonds or walnuts; Lemon sugar syrup; Vanilla sugar
- Variations: Multiple

Kadayif (Arabic: قطائف) is a sweet spun Middle Eastern dessert, and a type of shredded filo pastry dough popular in the Balkans and Levant, used for various Middle Eastern desserts.

== Preparation ==
Kadayif is made from fine dough threads ("string kadayif") with a filling of milled almonds or walnuts and sugar syrup. This filling is seasoned with vanilla sugar and then wrapped in the dough threads. After baking and cooling, it is soaked in lemon sugar syrup.

== Etymology and history ==
The word kadayif is the plural of the Arabic qatifah (قطيفة) 'velvet'. The shredded dough is called knafeh/kunafa (كنافة) in Arabic, which is also a dessert similar to kadayıf but stuffed with cheese. The name first appears in an Ottoman translation of Al-Baghdadi's 13th century cookbook Kitab al-Tabikh, as translated by Muhammed bin Mahmud Şirvani, a 15th-century Ottoman physician. According to oral tradition in Diyarbakır, the first kadayif vendor in the city was an Armenian shop owner named Agop.

A version filled with walnuts or pistachios flavored with cinnamon was traditionally served by the Sephardic Jewish community of Jerusalem during Rosh Hashanah and Purim.

== Varieties of kadayif and its usage ==
There are many recipes and desserts using Kadayif with some of them being documented in the first Ottoman printed cookbook, Melceü't-Tabbâhîn.

- Tel Kadayif
- Ekmek Kadayif
- Kadayif Pudding
- Knafeh
- Erzurum Dolma
- Dubai chocolate
- Burma Kadayif
- Tash Kadayif
- Sheki halva
- Othmalliyya

== See also ==
- Şekerpare
- Revani
- Baklava
- Tulumba
- List of Middle Eastern dishes

== Gallery ==
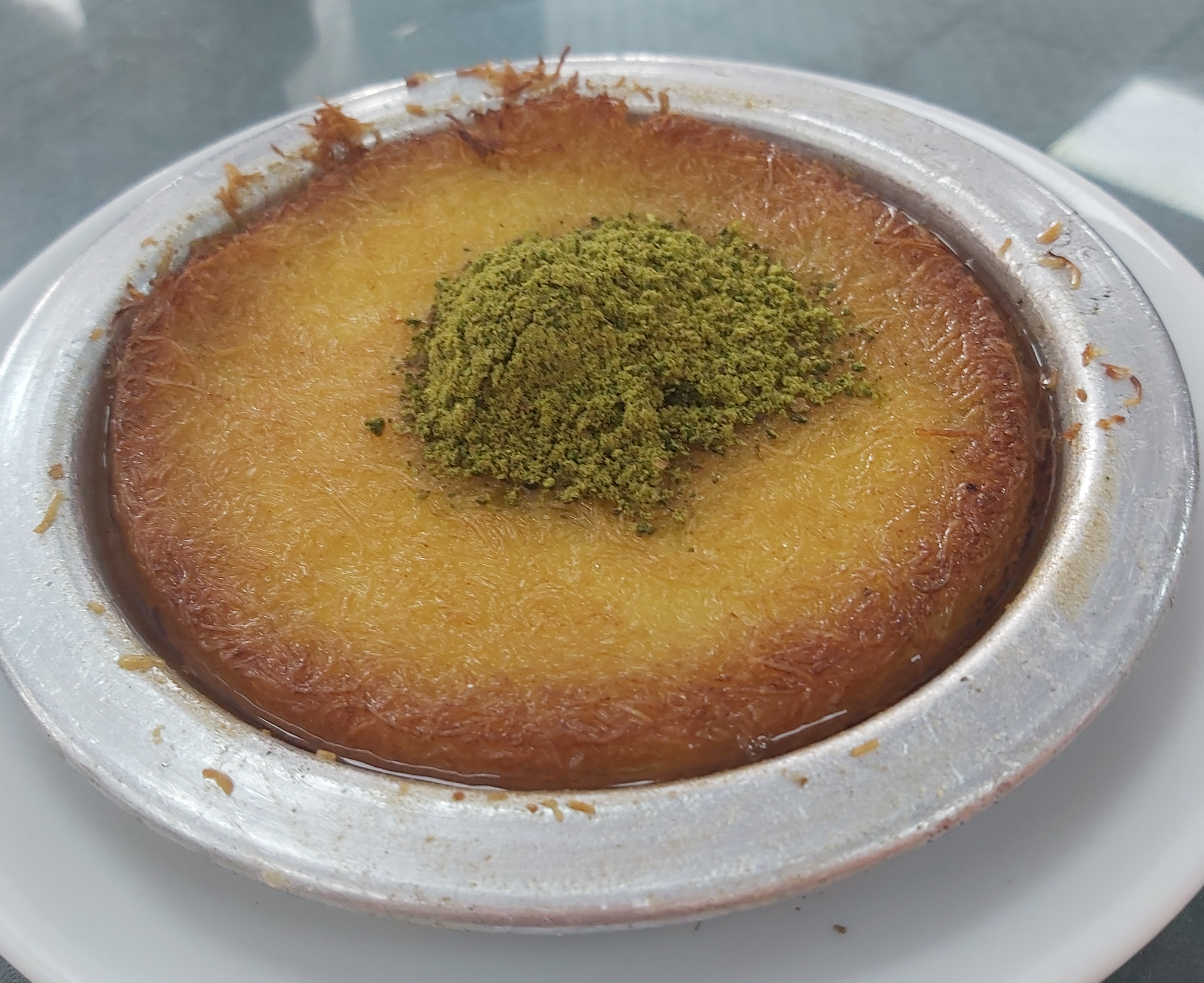
Kunefe

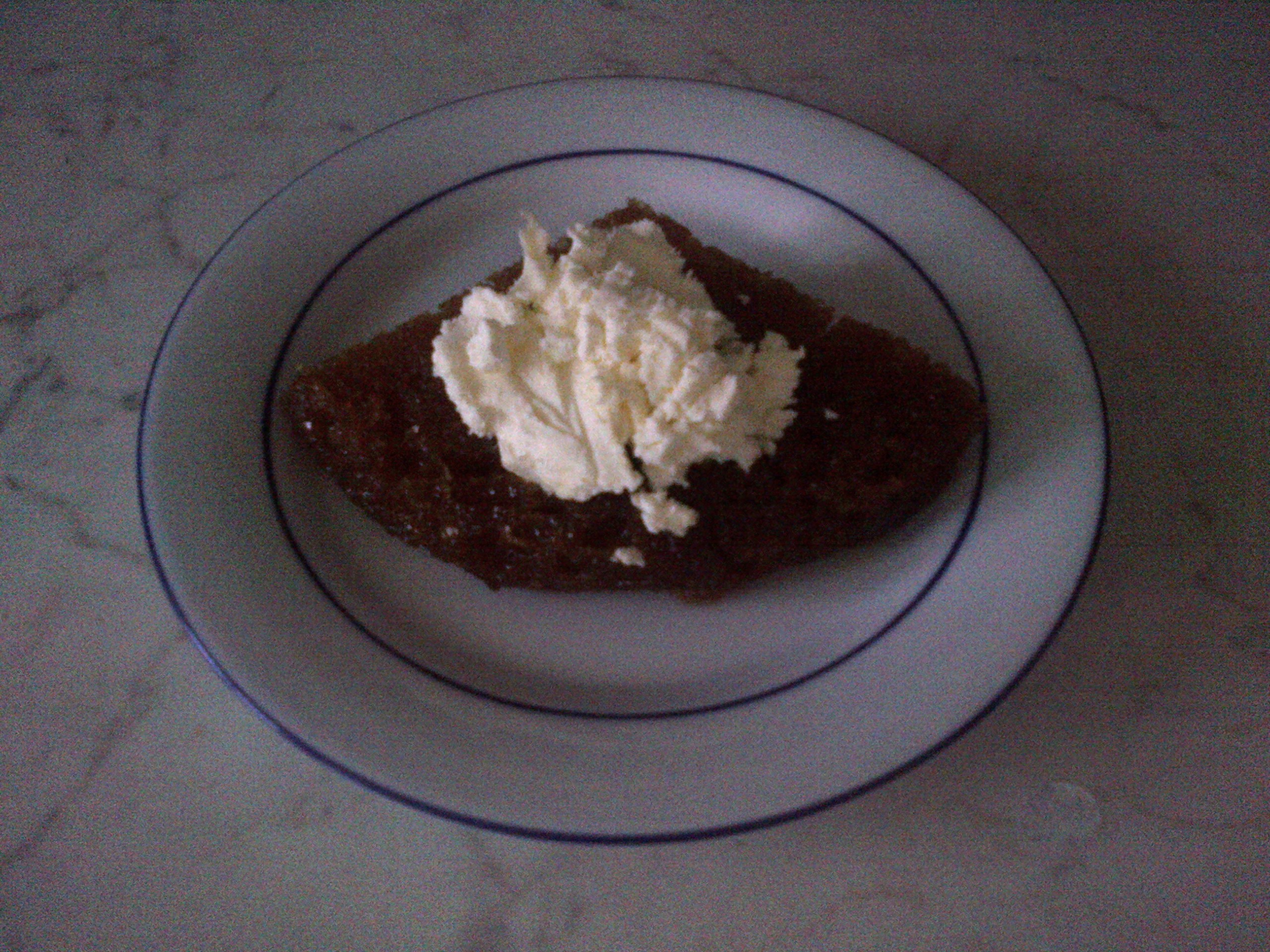
Ekmek Kadayif

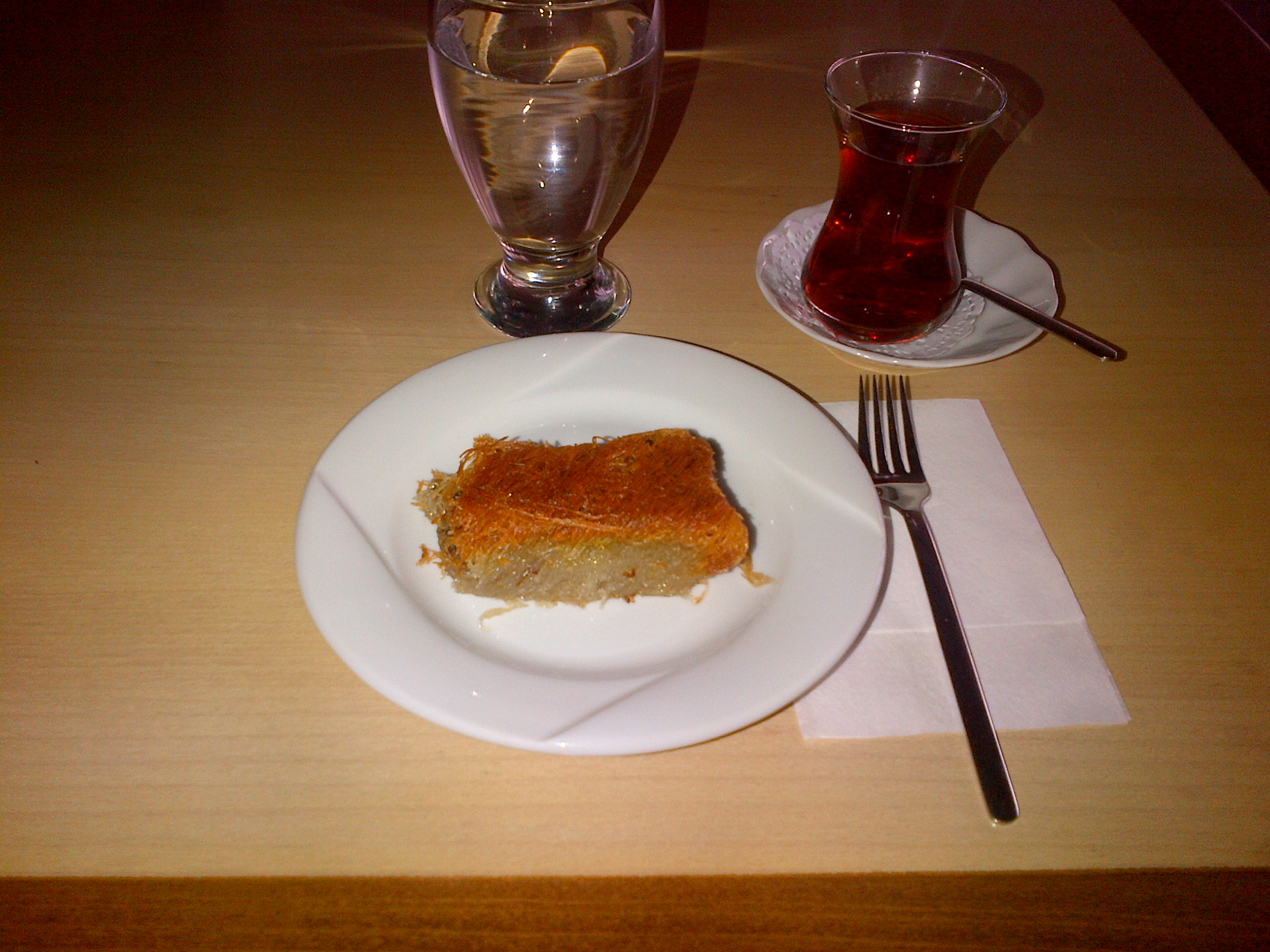
Burma Kadayif

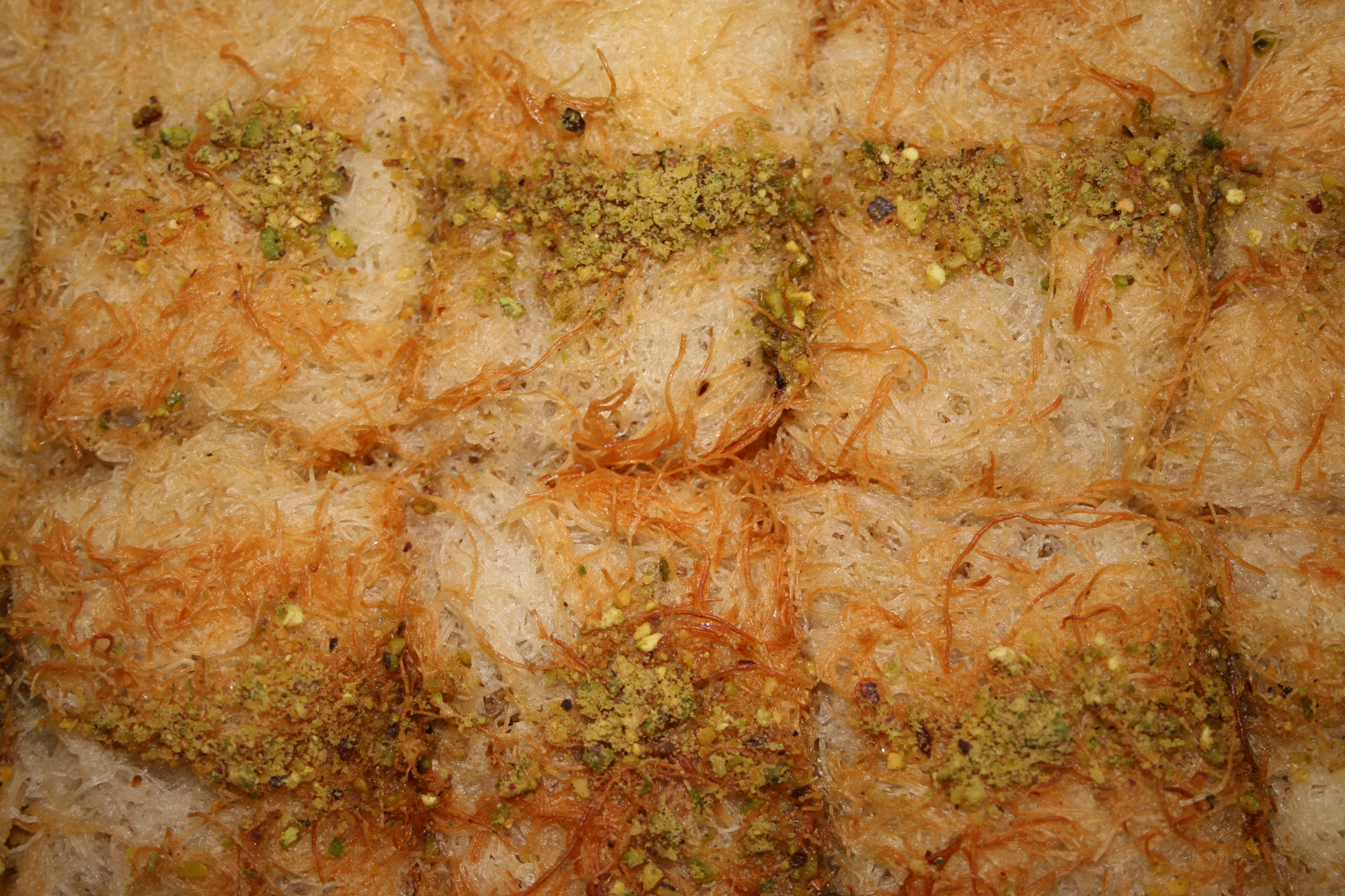
Tel Kadayif

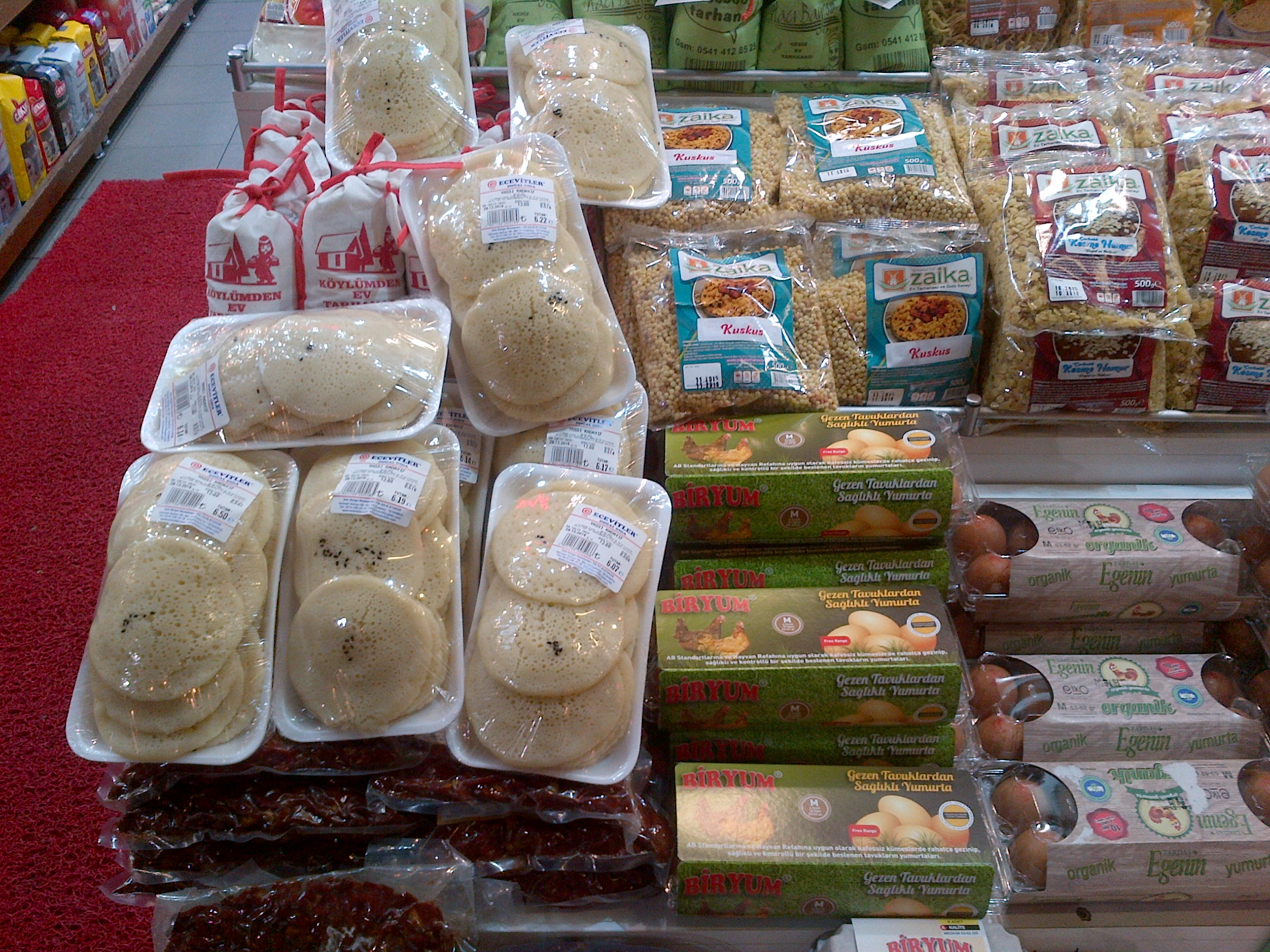
Yassi Kadayif

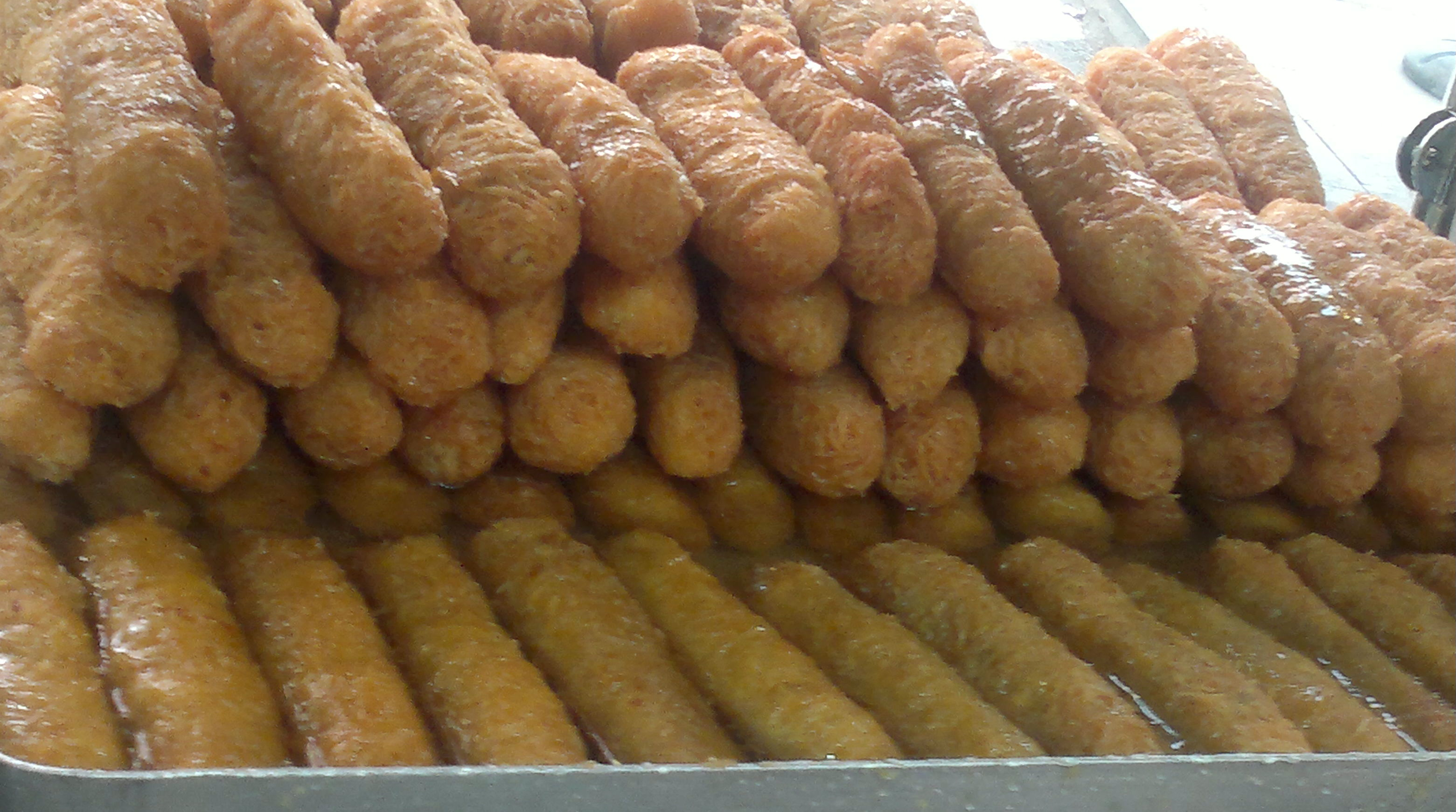
Erzurum Dolma

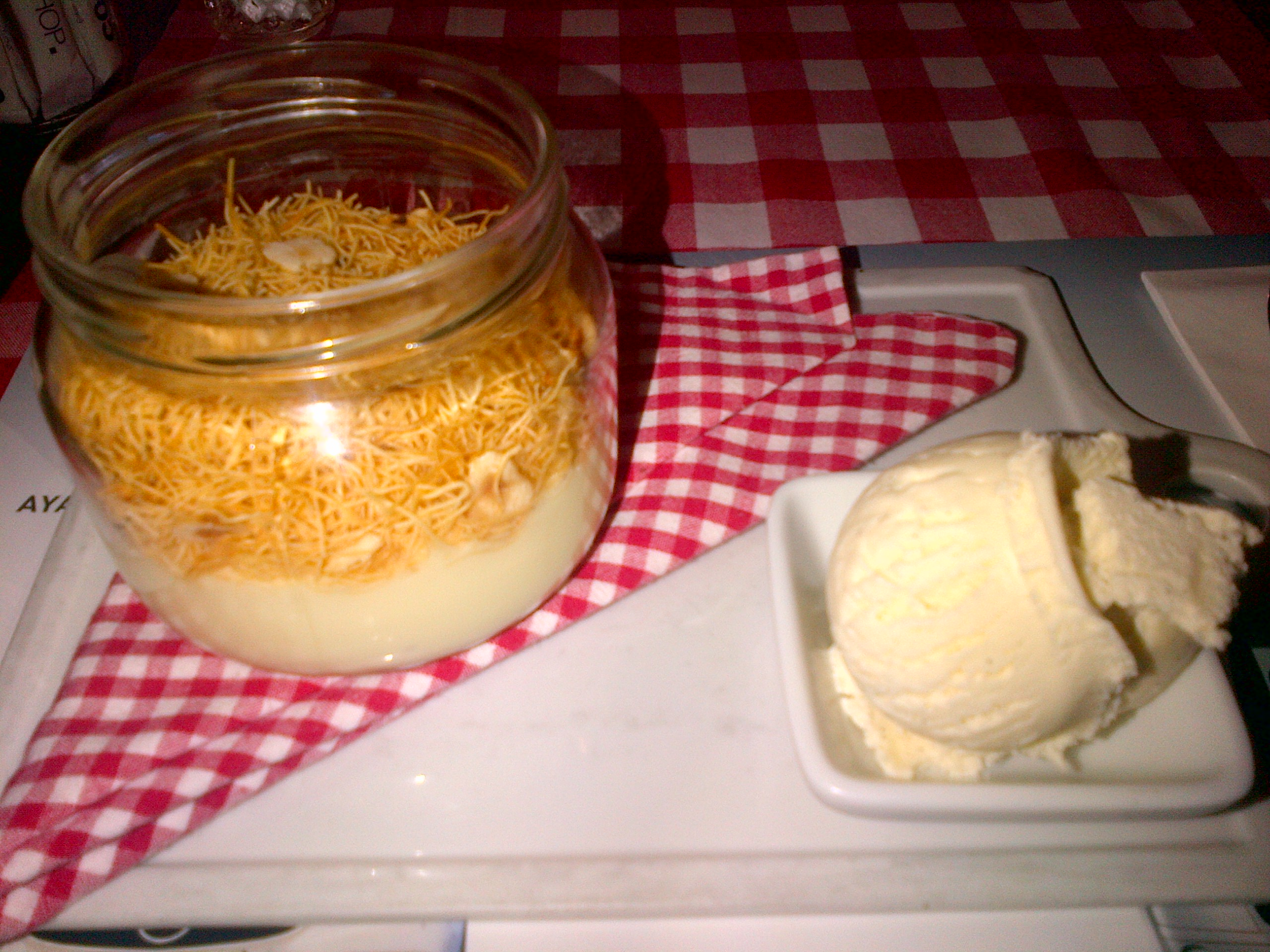
Kadayif Pudding
