= Outline of kadayif =

Turkish dessert

The term kadayif (Turkish: kadayıf) is used to describe a variety of desserts and dough in the Turkish cuisine, including the actual confections and unfinished intermediate products like dough. An Arabic dessert made of similar dough is the knafeh. While the word kadayif comes from Arabic qatayef linguistically, there is little overlap between the actual Arabic qatayef and Turkish kadayif desserts. Kadayif as a generic name for a group of pastry desserts can be found in the cookbook Melceü't-Tabbâhîn (1844).

- Unfinished products include:
  - Kadayif flour, a special flour made from the bisquit class wheat;
  - Kadayif dough,
  - wire kadayif, also known as kadayif noodles, simply kadayif, tel kadayif, and string kadayif, is a vermicelli-like, semi-processed product made by mixing wheat flour and water, cooked and optionally fried;
  - Tray kadaif (TS 10344), per Turkish standard 10344/T3, is a semi-processed (baked) water and flour mix product. Tray kadaif can also refer to a finished product (see below);
  - Başar & Boz mention lean kadayif and yufka kadayif. "Yufka" means "thin" and, at the same time, can be used to refer to filo dough.
- Kadaif confections include:
  - Tray kadayif (dessert), a dessert produced using tel kadayif and walnut. Variety of oils, hazelnut, sugar syrups can be added;
  - Yassı kadayıf, a pancake resembling Arabic qatayef dumpling Also called flat kadayif, Arab kadayif;
  - Turkish künefe is filled with cheese;
  - Ekmek kadayıfı or bread kadayif is made by pouring syrup on the bread. If leftover dry bread is used, it is called fodula kadayif
  - Erzurum kadayıf dolması, also known as stuffed kadayif - walnuts wrapped in tel kadaif and deep-fried;
  - Burma kadayıf is made from tel kadayif in Diyarbakır;
  - Kadayıflı muhallebi, a milk dessert;
  - Fındık ezmeli kadayıf tatlısı, a dessert with hazelnut paste;
  - Kesme kadayıf, a dessert using yufka;
  - Pekmezli kadayıf, made from tel kadayif with added molasses;
  - Sütlü kadayıf, a milk dessert;
  - other desserts mentioned in the literature: white kadayif, creamy kadayif, palace wire kadayif. Bezirgan declares the stone kadayif (Taş kadayıf) to be the same as flat kadayif and bread kadayif.

== See also ==
- Cataif, a Romanian dessert with crispy noodles on top

== Sources ==
- Walczak-Mikołajczakowa, Mariola (2023-04-23). "Turkish Borrowings in Bulgarian Lexis Related to Cuisine and Cooking" (PDF). Przegląd Humanistyczny (66/4): 93–101. doi:10.31338/2657-599X.ph.2022-4.7.
- Bezirgan, Muammer (2024-06-06), Turkish Desserts and the Place of Desserts in Turkish Cuisine (PDF), doi:10.5281/ZENODO.11509656, ISBN 978-2-38236-680-6
- Fidan, Zeliha; Kübra, Aktaş (2024). "Improvement of bread kadayıf formulation with wheat germ addition and different fermentation methods".
- Başar, Burak; Boz, Hüseyin (2023-05-04). "Effect of different oils and sugar syrups on the properties of tray kadayif (traditional Turkish dessert)". Journal of Ethnic Foods. 10 (1) 13. doi:10.1186/s42779-023-00178-3. ISSN 2352-6181.
- Savlak, Nazlı Yeyinli; Köse, Ergun (2013). "Bazı Özel Amaçlı Unların Kalite Özellikleri" [Quality Characteristics of Some Special Purpose Flours]. Akademik Gıda (in Turkish). 11 (2): 125–130.
- Civelek, P.; Kotancılar, H.G.; Türkoğlu, K. (2024). "Investigation of The Effect of Using Whole Wheat Flour and Different Additives in Bread Kadayif on Acrylamide and Hydroxymethyl Furfural (HMF)". Food Science and Engineering Research. 3 (1): 68–78.
- Krondl, M. (2011). Sweet Invention: A History of Dessert. Chicago Review Press. ISBN 978-1-56976-954-6.
- Seyyedcheraghi, K; Kotancilar, H G; Karaoglu, M M (2019). "Determination of acrylamide and hydroxymethylfurfural (HMF) values as affected by frying duration and temperature levels during the preparation of tray kadayif dessert". Applied Ecology and Environmental Research. 17 (2): 4007–4017. Bibcode:2019ApEER..17.4007S. doi:10.15666/aeer/1702_40074017.
- Başar, Burak (2017). Farkli yağ ve şeker şurubunun tepsi kadayifin duyusal ve dokusal özelliklerine etkisi [Effect Of Different Fat and Sugar Syrups on the Sensory and Textural Properties of Tray Kadayif] (Master thesis) (in Turkish). Erzurum: Ataturk University.
- Marks, Gil (2010). "Kanafeh / Kadayif". Encyclopedia of Jewish Food. Houghton Mifflin Harcourt. ISBN 978-0-544-18631-6.
