= Tel kadayıf =

Turkish dessert

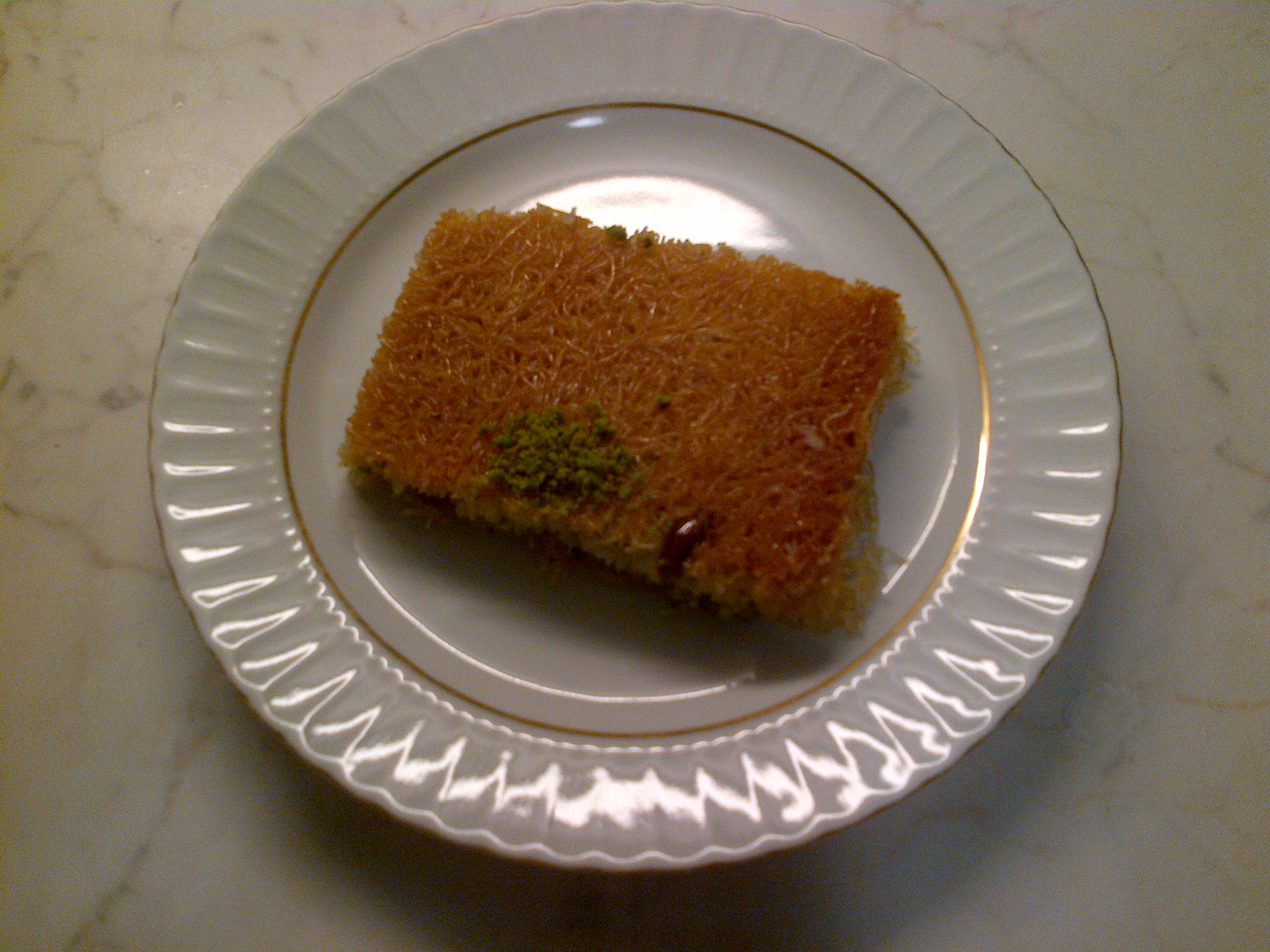
- Type: Kadayıf
- Place of origin: Turkey
- Created by: Ottoman cuisine

Tel kadayıf (Turkish: tel kadayıf) is a Turkish syrup-soaked pastry dessert made from fine strands of kadayıf dough. It is commonly served during Ramadan, though it is also eaten throughout the year. It is typically prepared by layering kadayıf strands with butter and a filling such as walnuts or pistachios, baking the pastry, and then pouring sugar syrup over it before serving.

== Varieties in Ottoman cuisine ==
In the first Ottoman printed cookbook, Melceü't-Tabbâhîn, there is a recipe as Âdi Tel Kadayıf.

== See also ==
- List of Turkish dishes
- Knafeh
