= Dubai chocolate =

Chocolate bar filled with kadayif and pistachio cream

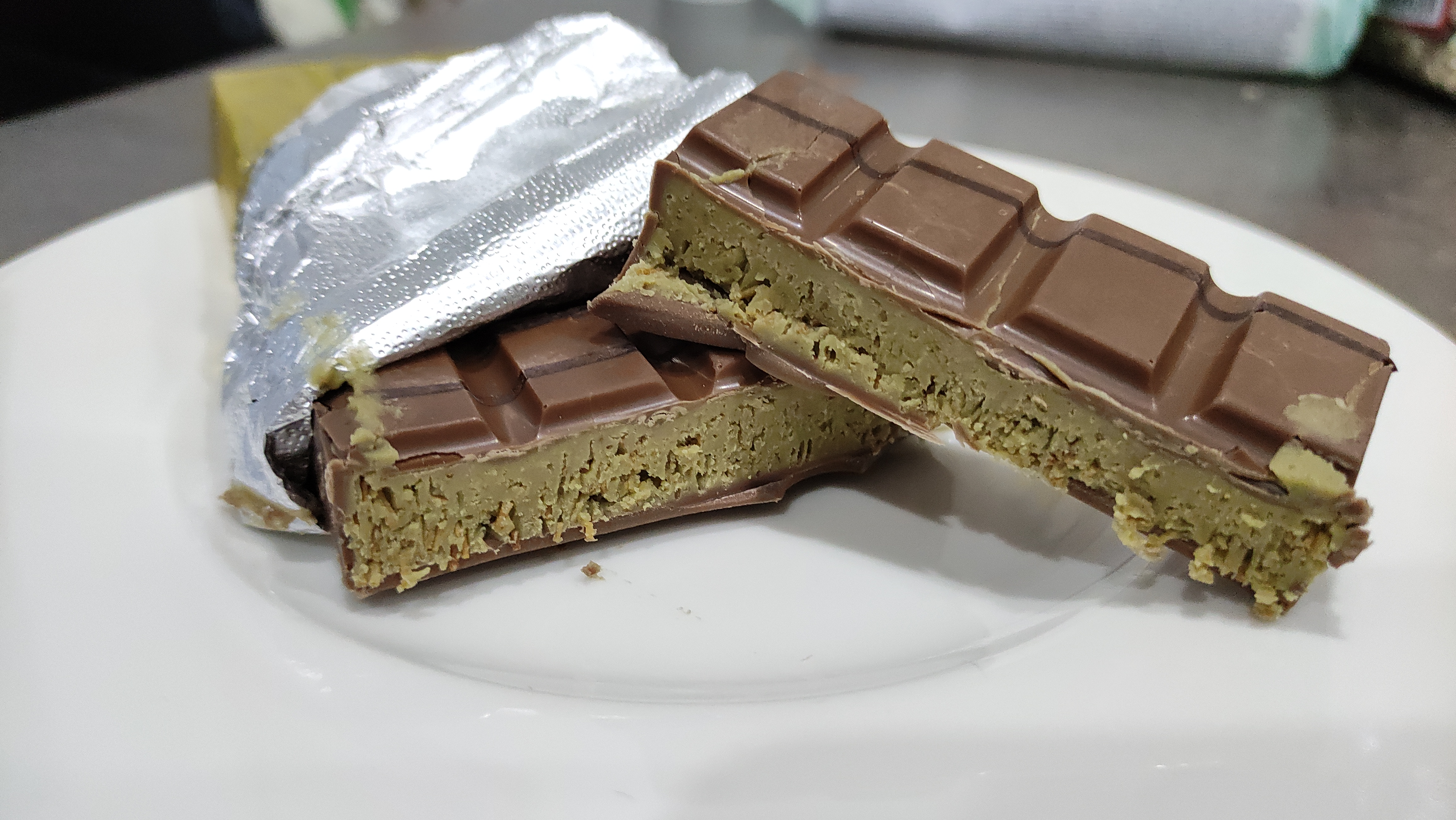
- Type: Chocolate bar
- Place of origin: United Arab Emirates
- Region or state: Dubai
- Invented: 2021
- Main ingredients: Milk chocolate, pistachio butter, tahini, kadayif

Dubai chocolate (Arabic: شوكولاتة دبي, romanized: shūkūlātat Dubayy) is a style of chocolate bar filled with chopped kadayif (spun filo pastry) and a pistachio-tahini cream.

It was created in 2021 by Nouel Catis Omamalin, a Filipino chef, and Sarah Hamouda, an Egyptian-British engineer, after she asked him to prepare a chocolate recipe similar to knafeh, which her mother used to make during her childhood. Hamouda and her husband are the co-owners of Fix Dessert Chocolatier, a chocolatier in Dubai.

Dubai chocolate was popularized in 2024 by influencers on social media, especially those on TikTok, and has since been imitated by vendors worldwide.

== Description ==
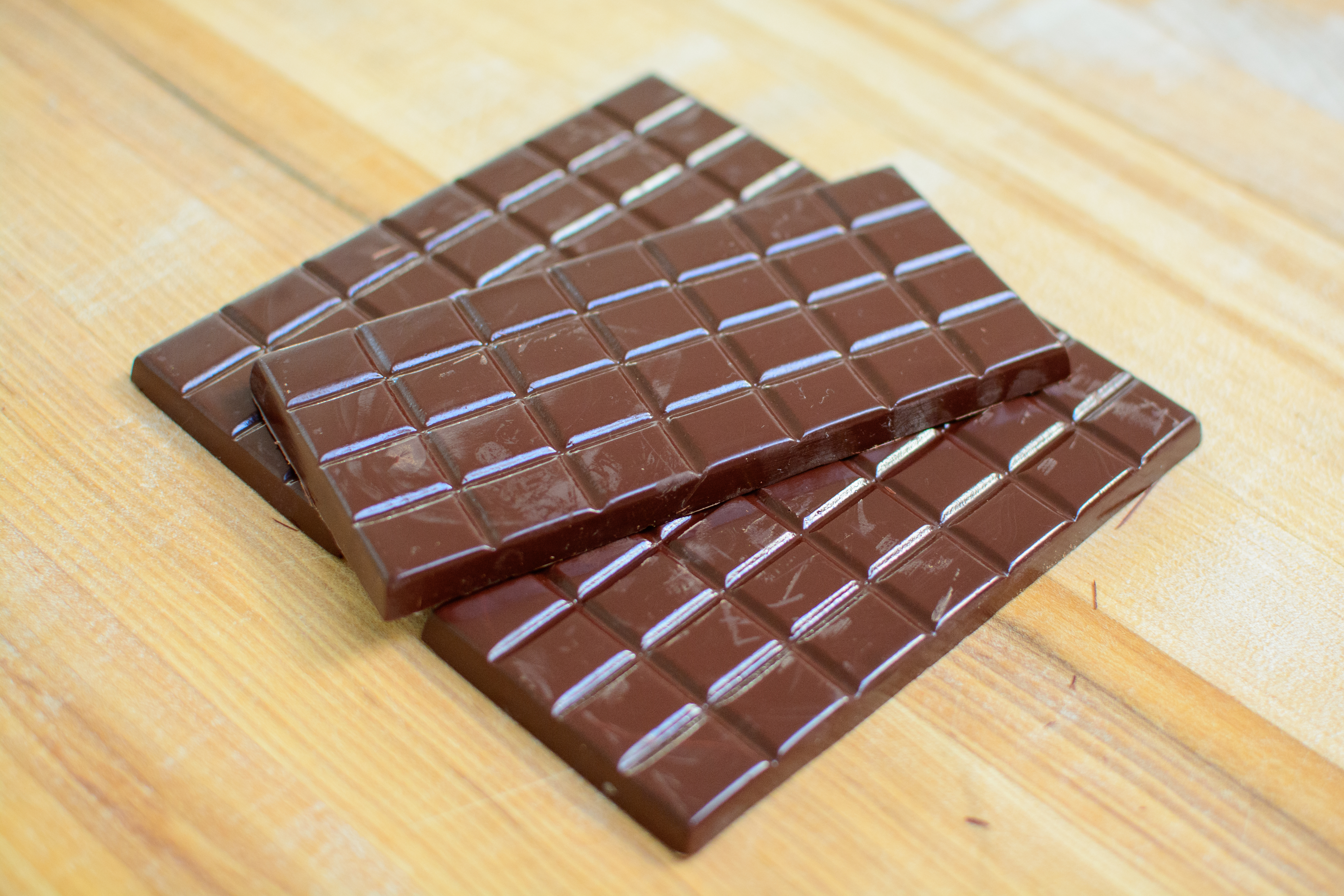
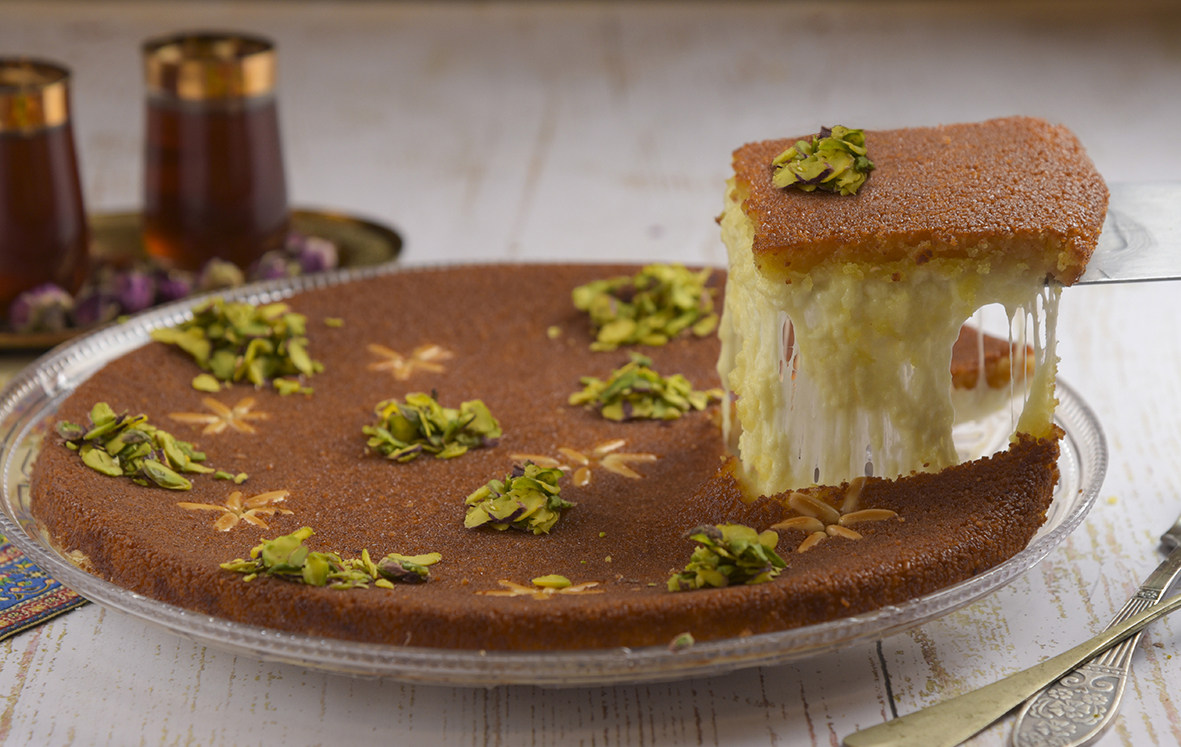
Dubai chocolate combines the chocolate bar (left) with a filling made from elements of knafeh, a traditional Arab dessert made with kadayif (spun pastry dough similar to filo) and often crushed pistachio.

Dubai chocolate is a milk chocolate bar filled with elements of knafeh, a traditional pastry made throughout former territories of the Ottoman Empire, including a sweet pistachio-tahini cream and chopped kadayif, strands of filo pastry dough.

The consistency of the filling ranges from finely ground to a paste. The creamy textures of the pistachio and tahini contrast with the crunch of the kadayif.

== History ==
Dubai chocolate was first released in 2022 by the Dubai-based online shop Fix Dessert Chocolatier under the name "Can't Get Knafeh of It".

Fix Dessert Chocolatier was started as a duo consisting of Sarah Hamouda, a British-Egyptian engineer living in Dubai, and her husband and business partner Yezen Alani. Sarah says she came up with the idea in 2021 when she was pregnant, and through her food cravings came to imagine combining chocolate, pistachio, tahini, and knafeh (a Middle Eastern dessert made of kadayif, syrup and a soft cheese). In her account, Hamouda worked on developing a bar at home before contacting Nouel Catis Omamalin, a Filipino culinary consultant who had trained as a pastry chef.

In his account of Dubai chocolate's creation, Omamalin said they wanted to create a chocolate bar with the flavour of a dessert. As his favourite Arabic dessert was knafeh, and because he thought it would have an appealing crunch and nostalgic value, Omamalin suggested a chocolate bar using its flavors. Together, they developed the chocolate, forming a partnership and the online shop Fix Dessert Chocolatier, although Omamalin left the partnership before the bar was released.

Can't Get Knafeh contained pistachio, tahini and kadayif, and was covered in yellow and green patterns. Bars were made by hand, the interiors piped; a team working six to eight hours would produce 25 bars a day. Omamalin, who had by the launch left the partnership, kept working with Hamouda, saying he was doing so "as a friend". Over the following year, they continued to modify the recipe, until early 2023 when Hamouda said they had "finally... nailed it". Each bar was sold for £16 (US$19.72), initially at a rate of one per week.

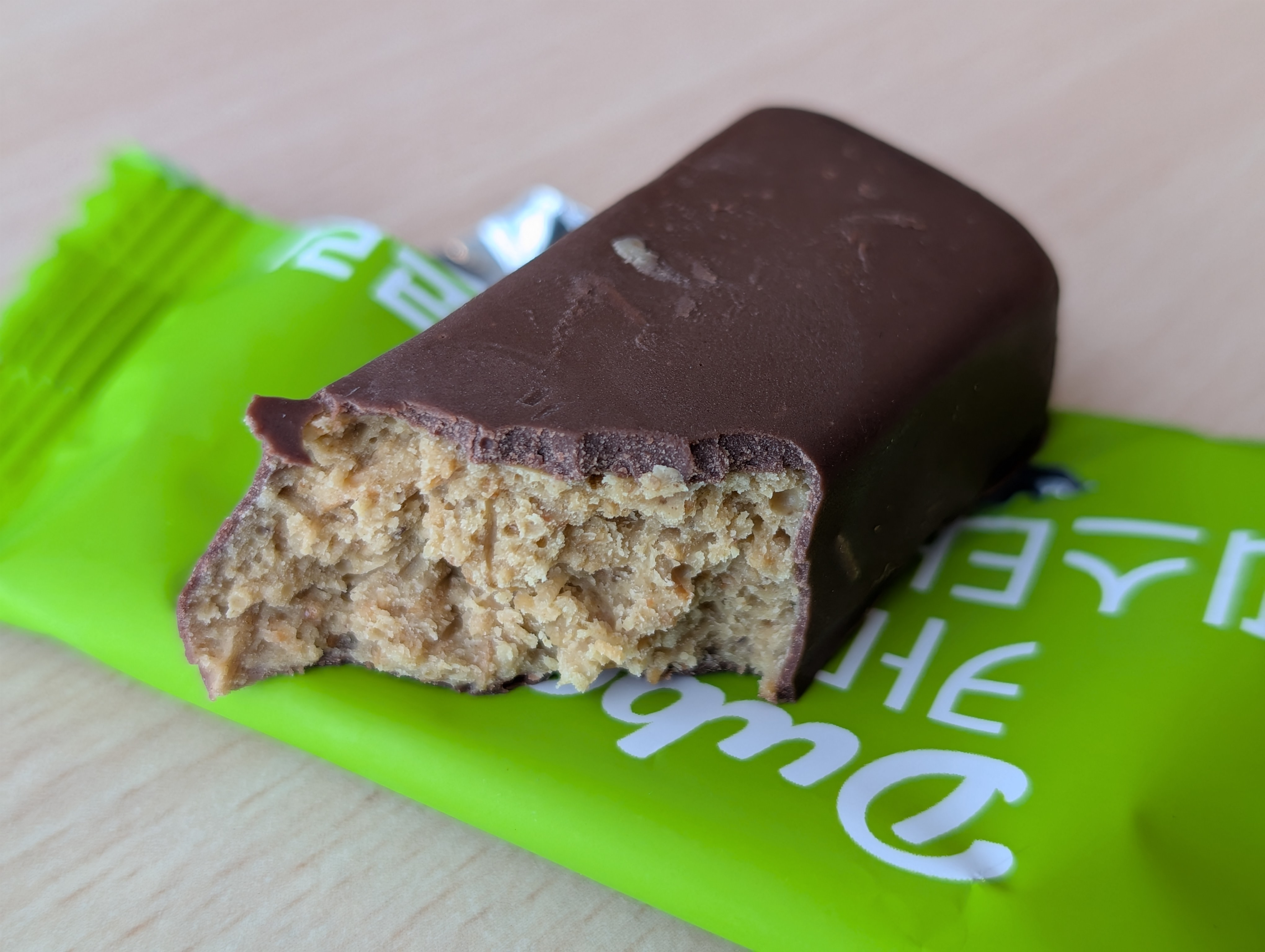
A Dubai-style chocolate sold in South Korea

With a small marketing budget, Fix relied on social media influencers to promote the chocolate, who tasted and reviewed it on camera. The interior's bright colors have been credited with some of the product's success, as the visual appeal created is important on social media platforms such as TikTok and Instagram. It first gained popularity in 2024.

== Expansion ==
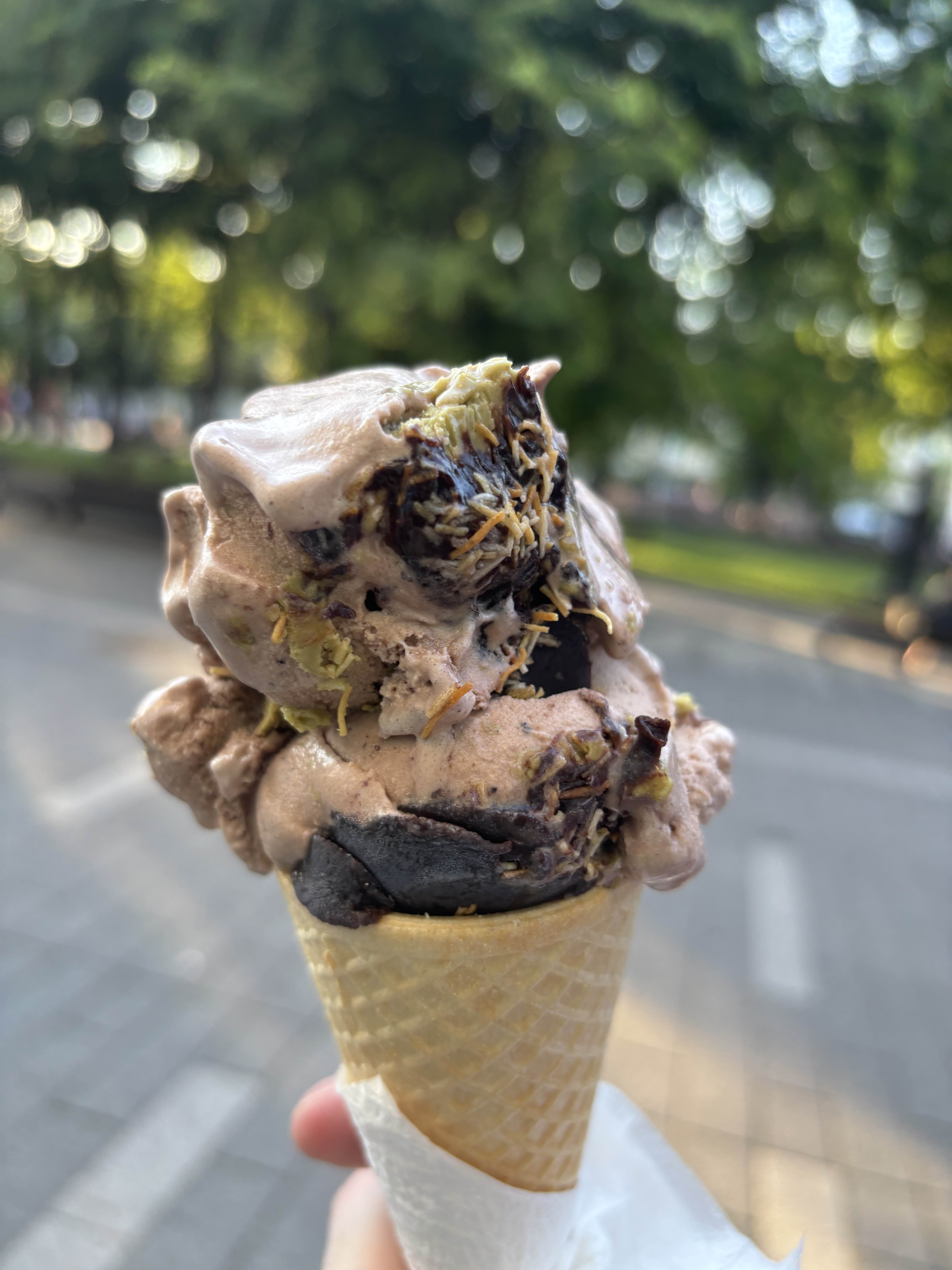
A Dubai chocolate-flavoured ice cream

As the product gained popularity, large scale manufacturers such as Lindt began to produce and market them as Dubai Chocolate. In Germany, an importer of a clone of Fix Dubai Chocolate issued a cease-and-desist letter to the manufacturer Lindt, Aldi, and Lidl because it was not produced in Dubai. While geographical indications are in principle protectable under the Geneva Act of the Lisbon Agreement, the United Arab Emirates has not signed the agreement. According to most legal scholars, the term "Dubai chocolate" is already a generic trademark in the EU market and does not contain any geographical indication.

In January 2025, a German court in Cologne judged that Aldi had to stop selling its product named "Alyan Dubai Handmade Chocolate" on the ground that it might mislead consumers into believing the chocolate had been produced in Dubai; it was actually produced in Turkey. In the UK, the popularity of the Lindt variety of the chocolate was such that the supermarket chain Waitrose imposed purchase limits of two bars per customer.

The popularity of Dubai chocolate has exacerbated the ongoing shortage of pistachios. The National Tax Service of South Korea reported that pistachio imports in 2025 had doubled compared to 2020, and attributed the increase to the popularity of Dubai chocolate in South Korea.

=== Variants ===
Dubai chocolate pizza is a variant of a chocolate pizza with Dubai chocolate stuffed crust and/or with Dubai chocolate replacing the cheese and sauce.

Dubai chocolate shakes are milkshakes containing Dubai chocolate ingredients as the flavoring.

Dubai chewy cookie is a marshmallow-based dessert with a Dubai chocolate filling that went viral in South Korea in early 2026. Locally known as "dujjonku", it is made by mixing toasted kataifi with pistachio cream, shaping the filling into a ball, and wrapping it in a chewy marshmallow-and-cocoa coating.

In September 2024, FIX Dessert Chocolatier created an exclusive flavour for Hamdan bin Mohammed Al Maktoum, the Crown Prince of Dubai, after he endorsed Dubai chocolate.

== Studies and allergens ==
A study by the Baden-Württemberg Ministry of Consumer Protection in Germany tested eight imported samples of "Dubai chocolate", five from the United Arab Emirates and three from Turkey. It considered all eight samples "defective". Five of the products sampled contained vegetable fats other than cocoa butter, which is not permitted in products labelled "chocolate" in Germany. The study also found that five samples, all from the same producer in the UAE, were "unfit for consumption" due to contamination in the manufacturing process as they contained excessive levels of a substance that is considered a probable carcinogen (glycidyl fatty acid esters, 3-MCPD), resulting from the use of low-quality palm oil. All three samples from Turkey were found to contain traces of undeclared sesame, usually as tahini, which may be dangerous for people allergic to sesame. A screening also revealed high levels of mold toxins (aflatoxins) in the pistachio component of one sample.

== Criticism ==
Current Affairs and Time have described Dubai chocolate as a form of cultural soft power for the United Arab Emirates, which Current Affairs describes as an authoritarian monarchy with an extensive record of human rights abuses. Bobby Ghosh wrote in Time that Dubai has been "dismissed as inauthentic, a plastic-wrapped urban fantasy built on oil wealth, where tradition has been sacrificed on the altar of commercialism". According to Alex Skopic in Current Affairs, as a result of the popularity of Dubai chocolate, the word "Dubai" is increasingly associated with chocolate rather than the city's repressive laws and mistreatment of foreign workers.

== See also ==
- List of chocolate-covered foods
- List of candies
- Al Nassma Chocolate
