= Ekmek kadayıfı =

Turkish style bread pudding

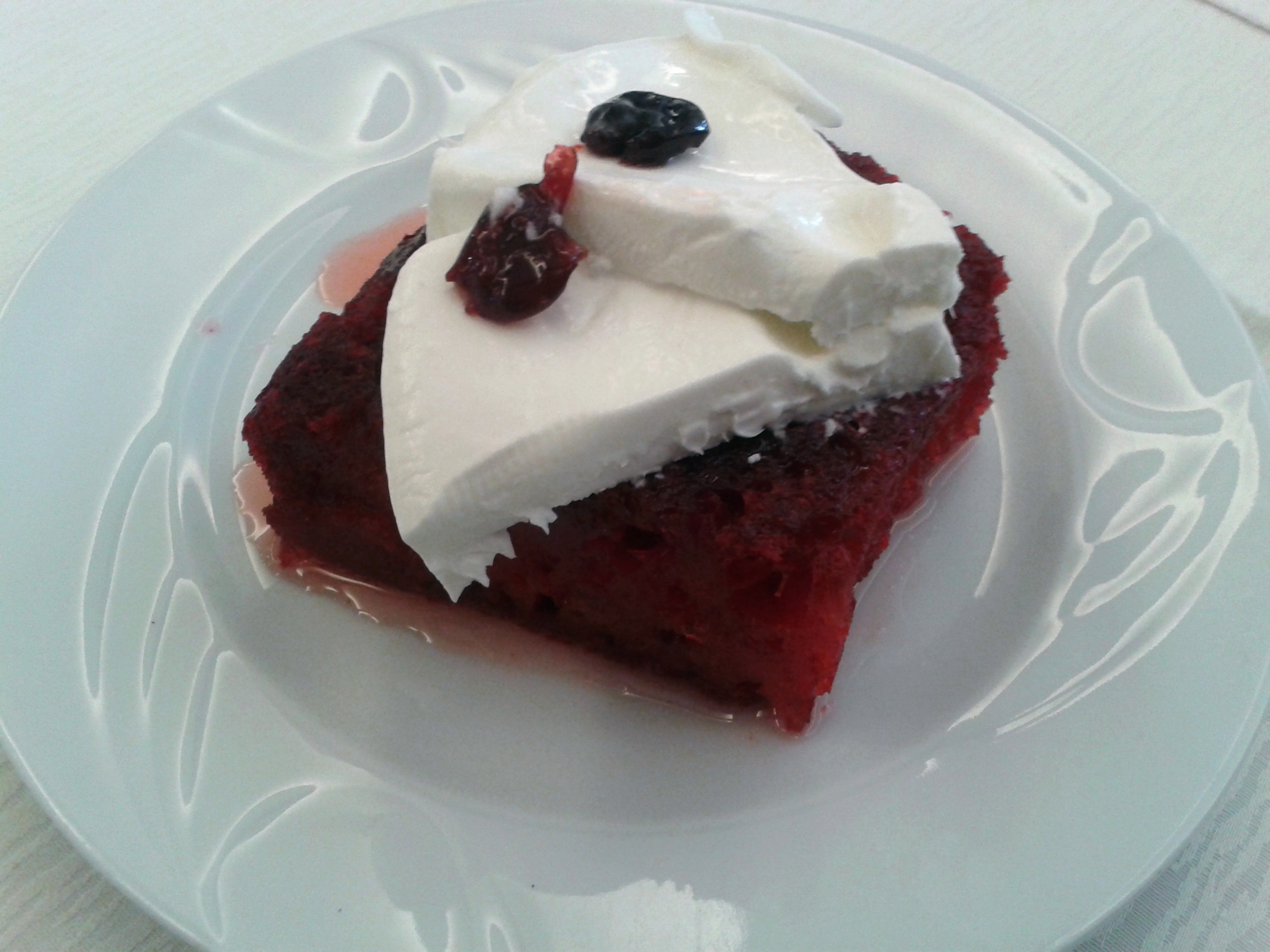
- Type: Bread pudding
- Course: Dessert
- Region or state: Turkey
- Main ingredients: Bread

Ekmek kadayıfı is a specialty dessert of Turkish cuisine but it is also known in many regions that were historically part of the Ottoman Empire. The Turkish name of the dessert literally translates as "Kadayıf made of ekmek (Turkish bread)" giving clues on its preparation. The dessert is usually served with kaymak, a kind of clotted cream. Historically being a regional specialty of Afyonkarahisar, the dessert is served in special events within its region of origin. The dessert may optionally be flavored or topped with cherries of which Afyonkarahisar produces a significant amount. In Greek cuisine, it is known as "ekmek kataifi".

== History ==
Historically, as with other bread puddings, this recipe emerged as a way to utilize stale or day-old bread. For modern home cooks, it is a popular alternative to more demanding traditional desserts like baklava. It is served at iftar meals during Ramadan. According to George Mardikian, the dish "is the creation of the famous chef, Tocatlian, who had the honor of entertaining Empress Eugenie. It was for her pleasure that this master chef created 'bubbles of cream kaymak.' It has become one of the outstanding desserts of Constantinople."

== Preparation ==
In modern times, ekmek kadayıfı is sold ready made. All the cook needs to do at home to prepare the dessert is to make the sugar syrup called "şerbet" and top the finished dessert with "kaymak".

To prepare the dessert from scratch with bread, first a piece of bread is carefully hollowed out to make a bread bowl. If the bread is too fresh it may be further dried in an oven. Then, şerbet is poured over the prepared bread. It is important to prepare the bread correctly to maximize absorption of şerbet. When the bread has fully absorbed the şerbet, it softens. The bread bowl can then be filled with kaymak before serving. The finished dessert is flipped upside down to make ice cream stuffed ekmek kadayıfı.

Some recipes prepare it as a simple cake made with eggs, flour and sugar. First the eggs and sugar are whisked until the eggs are frothy, then the flour is mixed in. A little baking powder is added as a leavening agent. The cream filling for the cake is made with milk, cornstarch, flour, sugar and powdered Crème Chantilly. When fully baked, the thin cake is cut in half like a layer cake. Şerbet syrup is poured over the bottom layer and a layer of cream is spread between the two cake layers. The top layer is cut into slices and arranged on top of the cream. The remaining şerbet syrup is poured over the assembled cake, which is garnished with ground pistachio and shredded coconut. The cake is left to set in the fridge for several hours before it is ready to be served.

== See also ==
- List of Turkish desserts
- Qatayef
- Kanafeh
