= Knafeh =

Middle Eastern dessert

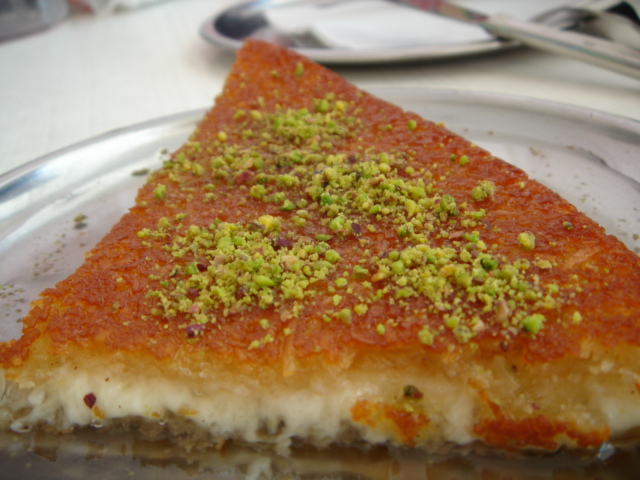
- Künefe from Hatay, Turkey
- Alternative names: Kunafeh; Kunafa; Kanafeh; Konafi; Kunaftah; Künefe; Kinafa
- Type: Dessert
- Region or state: Arab world
- Serving temperature: Warm, room temperature, or cold (qishta variety)
- Main ingredients: Dough; Sugar; Cheese; Almonds; Pistachios; Rose water; Kaymak
- Variations: Multiple

Knafeh (Arabic: كنافة) is a traditional Arab dessert made with kadayif (spun pastry dough) layered with cheese and soaked in a sweet, sugar-based syrup called attar. Knafeh is popular throughout the Arab world, especially Egypt and the Levant. Knafeh is often served on special occasions, holidays and Ramadan. The most common variant in Jordan and Palestine, Knafeh Nabulseyeh, originated in the Palestinian city of Nablus.

== Etymology ==
English borrowed the word knafeh from Levantine and Egyptian Arabic, and transliterates it as kanafeh, kenafeh, knafeh, kunafah, kunafeh, konafa, knéfé, kunafa, and similar variations.

The ultimate origin of the word is debated. It may come from the Coptic Egyptian kenephiten, a bread or cake. Or it may come from a Semitic root meaning "side" or "wing", and from the Arabic kanafa, "to flank or enclose". Early uses appear in One Thousand and One Nights, a collection of Middle Eastern folktales.

== History ==
A common story is that the knafeh was created to satisfy the hunger of caliphs during Ramadan. The story, which dates in writing as early as the 10th century, is variously said to have occurred in Fatimid Egypt or in the Umayyad Caliphate in Damascus, Syria, where Levantine dessert makers preparing it for Mu'awiya I.

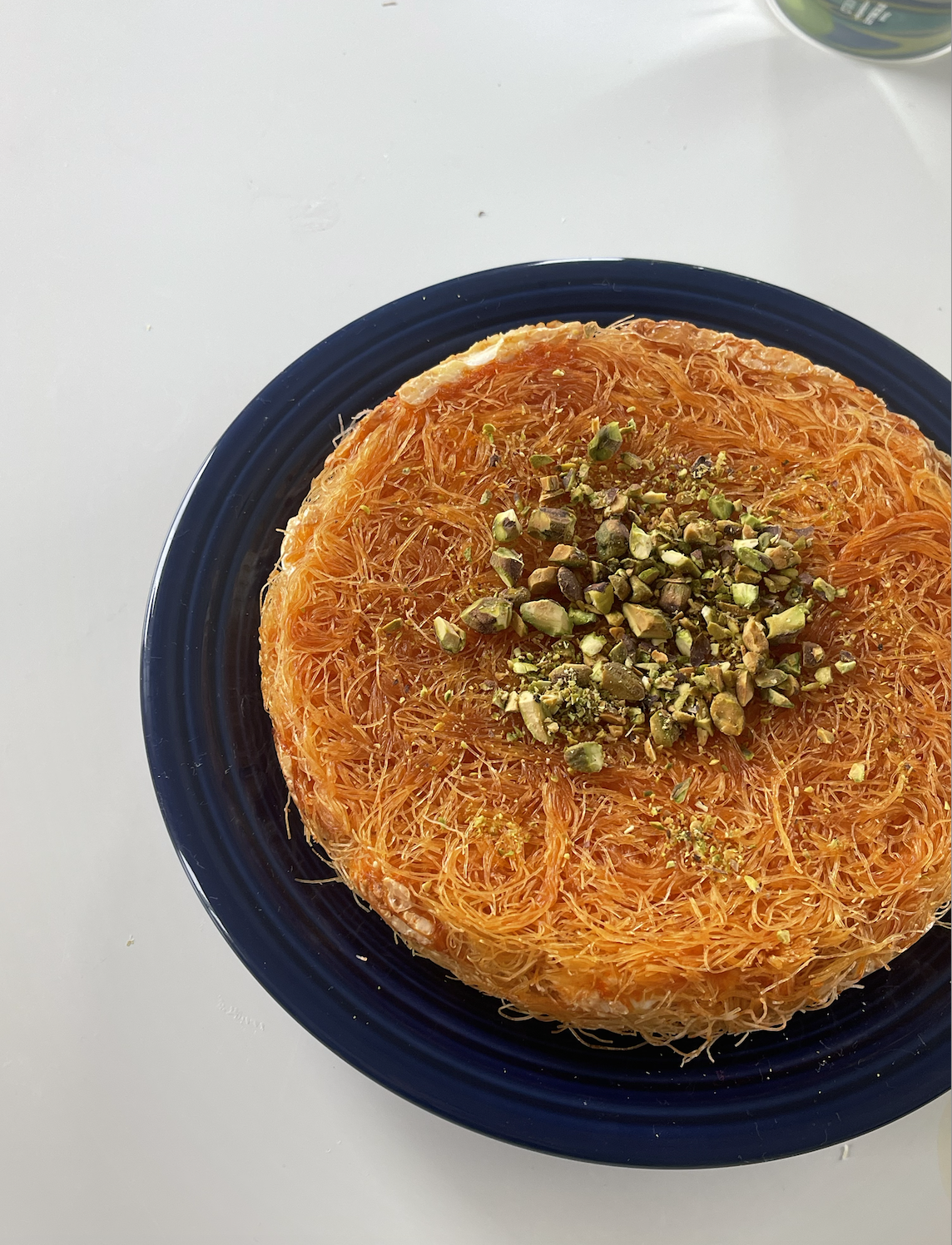
Homemade knafeh from Feast: Food of the Islamic World by Anissa Helou (page 444)

Ibn Sayyar al-Warraq's tenth century Arabic cookbook, Kitāb al-Ṭabīkh (Book of Dishes), which documented many recipes from Abbasid courts, does not mention or describe knafeh. However, it does feature a chapter on qatayif, an Arabic pancake dumpling dessert that originated in the Fatamid Empire. The 13th century cookbook, Kitab al tabikh fi-l-Maghrib wa-l-Andalus (Book of Dishes from Maghreb and Al-Andalus), of unknown authorship, provides a number of recipes for knafeh, which it describes as a pancake dumpling thinner than qatayif prepared on a flat pan. Some call for layering the thin pancake with fresh cheese, baking it, and topping it with honey and rose syrup.

Ibn al-Jazari gives an account of a 13th-century Mamluk period market inspector who rode through Damascus at night ensuring the quality of knafeh, qatayif, and other foods associated with Ramadan. Over time, new preparation methods were developed, including a technique of dripping thin batter onto a metal sheet from a perforated container, creating hair-like strings. A mid-15th century Ottoman Turkish translation of Muhammad bin Hasan al-Baghdadi's Kitab al-Tabikh added several new contemporary knafeh recipes, but does not specify where they originated.

=== Modern era ===
According to historian Mary Isin, cheese-filled knafeh does not appear in any historical records prior to the 19th century. Turkish and Arabic Damascene recipes from the 18th century always used different nuts as filling. An 1844 dictionary for Syrian and Egyptian Arabic by Swedish orientalist Jacob Berggren mentions a knafeh made of string dough and qaymaq, a sort of cooked cream. Food historian Daniel Newman cites an 1885 cookbook published in Beirut as the earliest documented example of a cheese-filled variant. The 1885 Beirut cookbook Ustadh al-Tabbakhin by author Khalil Khattar Sarkis provided four recipes for knafeh: cheese-filled, burma (rolled), mafroukeh (where knafeh pastry is rubbed by hand to soften it), and knafeh basma, which is made with two layers of pastry. Gustaf Dalman described in 1935 knafeh basma made with sweetened cheese between two layers of pastry being made in Sidon and Jerusalem.

The book "Comparative Encyclopedia of Aleppo" by Syrian author Khayr al-Din al-Asadi, completed in 1971 and published posthumously in 1981, described 10 different kinds of knafeh, including Nabulsi knafeh.

== Common variants ==
Knafeh Nabulseyeh served in a Nablus souk, or street market

=== Knafeh Nabulseyeh (Nablus, Palestine) ===
Knafeh has been described as a "Palestinian Institution." Knafeh Nabulseyeh is a popular version which originated in the Palestinian city of Nablus, hence the name Nabulseyeh (also spelled as Nabilsiyeh). Nablus is still renowned in for its knafeh, which "is filled with the city’s trademark firm, white, salty nabulsi cheese" and covered with a sweet syrup called qatir, it has one layer of either rough (kadayif) or soft (semolina) knafeh pastry atop the cheese, typically prepared upside down then flipped, with soft dough being more popular than kadayif for Nabulsi knafeh.

It is prepared by pressing the dough (traditionally includes orange food coloring) into a large baking pan coated with clarified butter. Desalted white cheese is layered evenly over the dough, and the pan is heated on a stovetop until the bottom crust cooks. The pastry is then inverted onto a serving platter and briefly placed back on the stove so the cheese fully melt. Finally, the dish is finished by pouring syrup over it and garnishing it with nuts before serving hot.

Associations between Nablus and knafeh date back to at least 1923 when Khalil Totah described knafeh as "a part of a Nabulsi's life". ʻAbd al-Wahhāb ʻAzzām's 1950 book Riḥlāt noted that "Nablus is famous for its knafeh". Today, knafeh Nabulseyeh is the most common variant in Jordan and Palestine. As a result, academics have described Nablus as the modern-day knafeh capital.

=== Knafeh Ghazawiya (Gaza Strip, Palestine) ===
Knafeh Ghazawiya is a Palestinian variant unique to the Gaza Strip. It is made with a variety of Gazan nuts and spices, with "nutmeg and cinnamon replacing the cheese." The pastry is made from semolina and bulgur.

=== Osmalieh ===
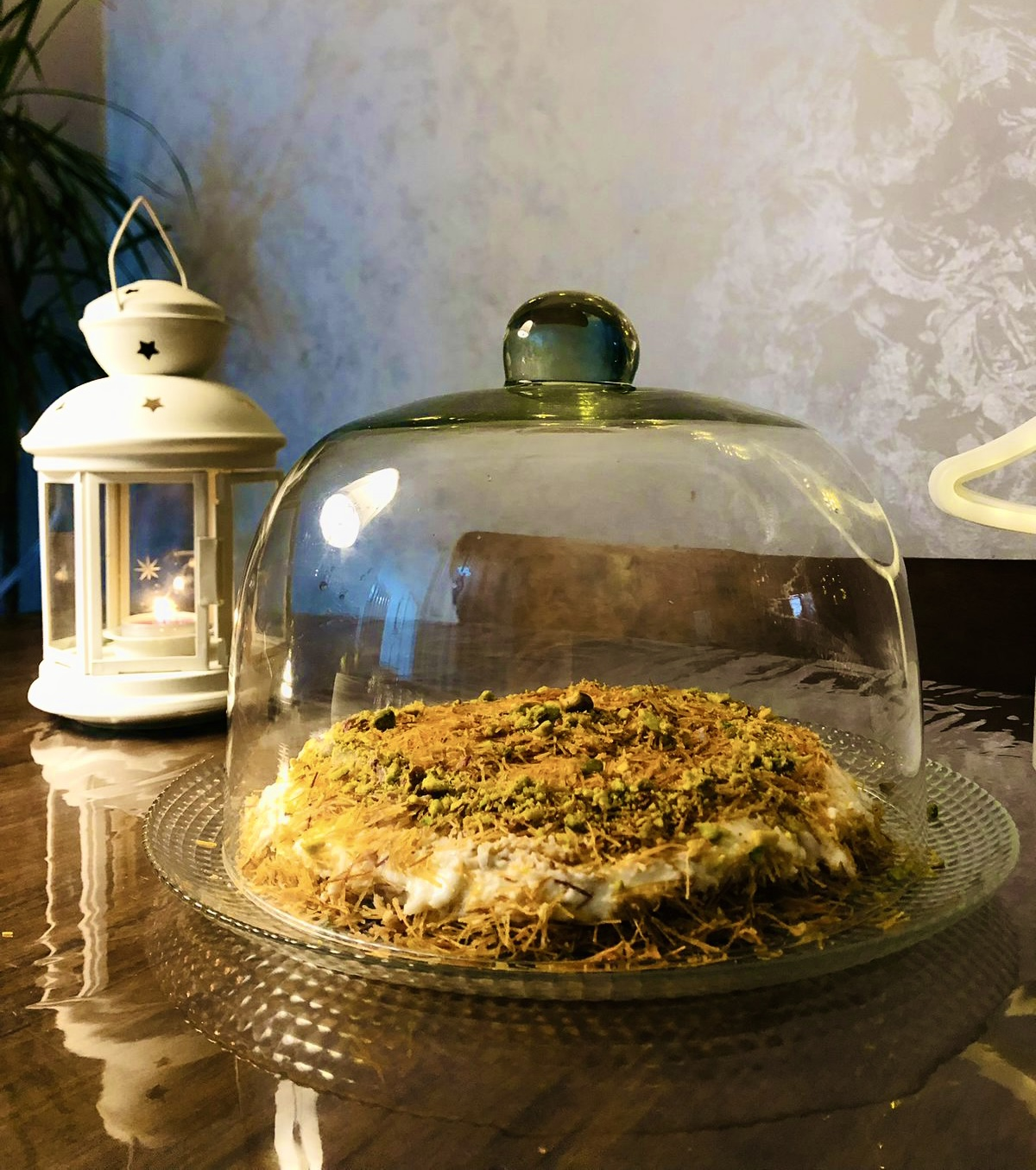
knafeh osmalieh

Osmalieh (عصملية, also spelled Othmaliye, Arabic: عثملية) is a variety found in Syria and Lebanon. It is made from two layers of kadayif with a layer of qishta sandwiched between them. It is traditionally prepared by pressing the dough into a cake pan before frying it in ghee or cooking oil. This is done for two layers. Qishta is then placed upon one layer, with the second layer placed over the qishta, forming a "sandwich"-like confection. It is garnished with ground pistachio, qatir, lemon or orange blossom, and flower petals. It can be served cold or hot. The dessert spread from the Levant region to the broader Arab world. It is commonly eaten during Ramadan. Contemporary variations of osmalieh use alternate fillings like ice cream or cream cheese.

The name is derived from the name Ottoman or Othman.

=== Künefe (Hatay, Turkey) ===
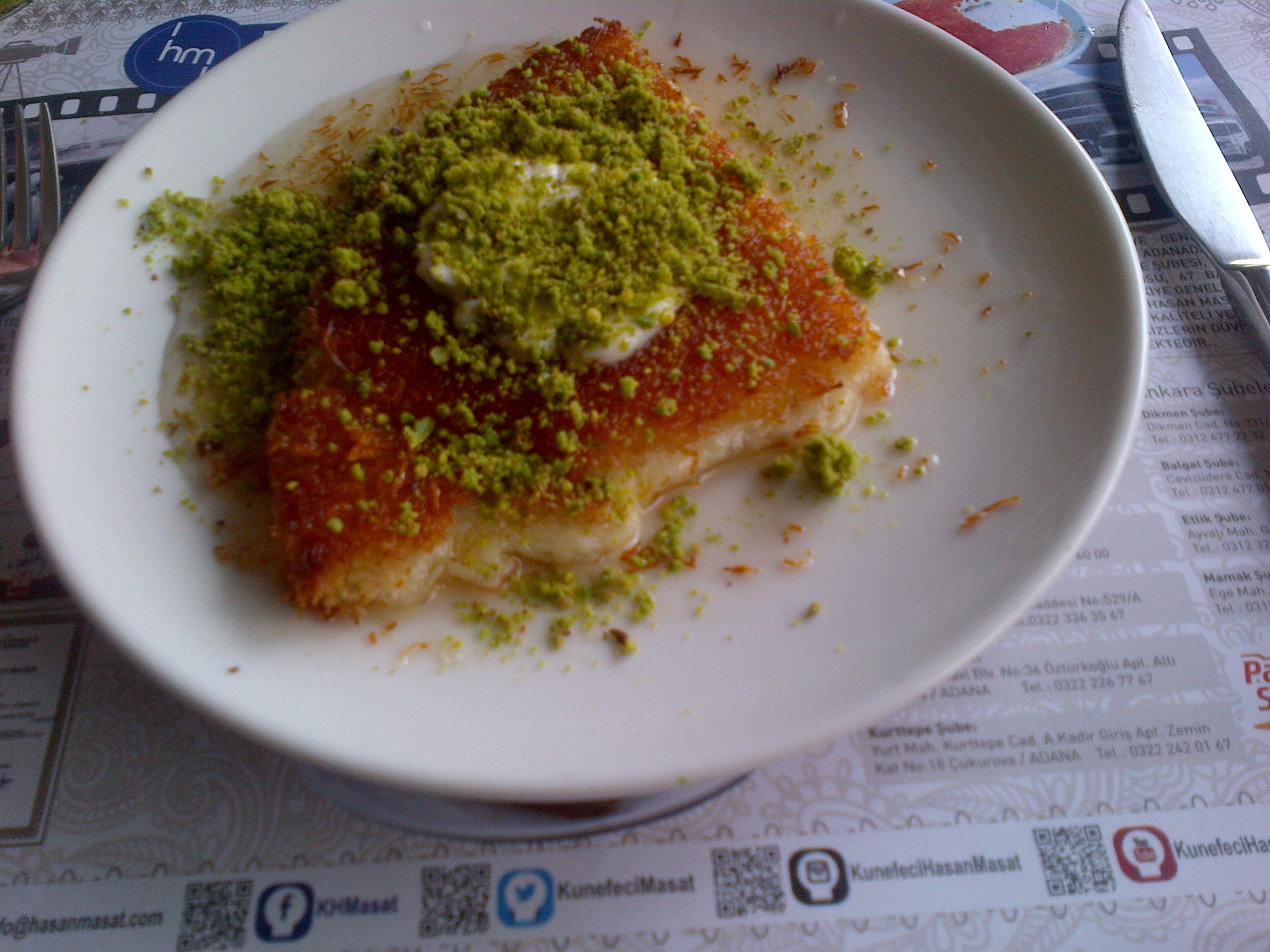
Künefe from Hatay, Turkey, garnished with kaymak and pistachios.

Künefe is a variant of knafeh believed to have originated in Hatay Province, Turkey. It is filled with a mozzarella-like local Hatay cheese and coated in "a syrup made of water, sugar and lemon juice." In 2012, the EU Commission approved Antakya Künefesi, a variant of both kadayif and künefe, as a Protected Geographical Indication (PGI). It also received a geographic indication by the Turkish Patent and Trademark Office. Both geographic indications specify that Hatay kunefe is made with two separately heated layers of pastry around the cheese.

=== Dubai chocolate ===
Dubai chocolate are chocolate bars with kadayif and pistachio filling. It was first produced by Fix Dessert in Dubai, but versions are now sold worldwide. While originally inspired by knafeh and first sold under the name "Can't Get Knafeh Of It".

=== Knafah Ramlawiyyah ===
Knafah Ramlawiyyah (كنافة رملاوية) is a variety of knafeh common in Amman, Jordan. It is made by mixing pine nuts, walnuts, knafeh pastry or semolina, and samneh on a sheet pan before baking it and soaking it in syrup. Its name is attributed to the city of Ramleh, where it is thought to have originated before spreading to Jordan.

=== Knafeh basma ===
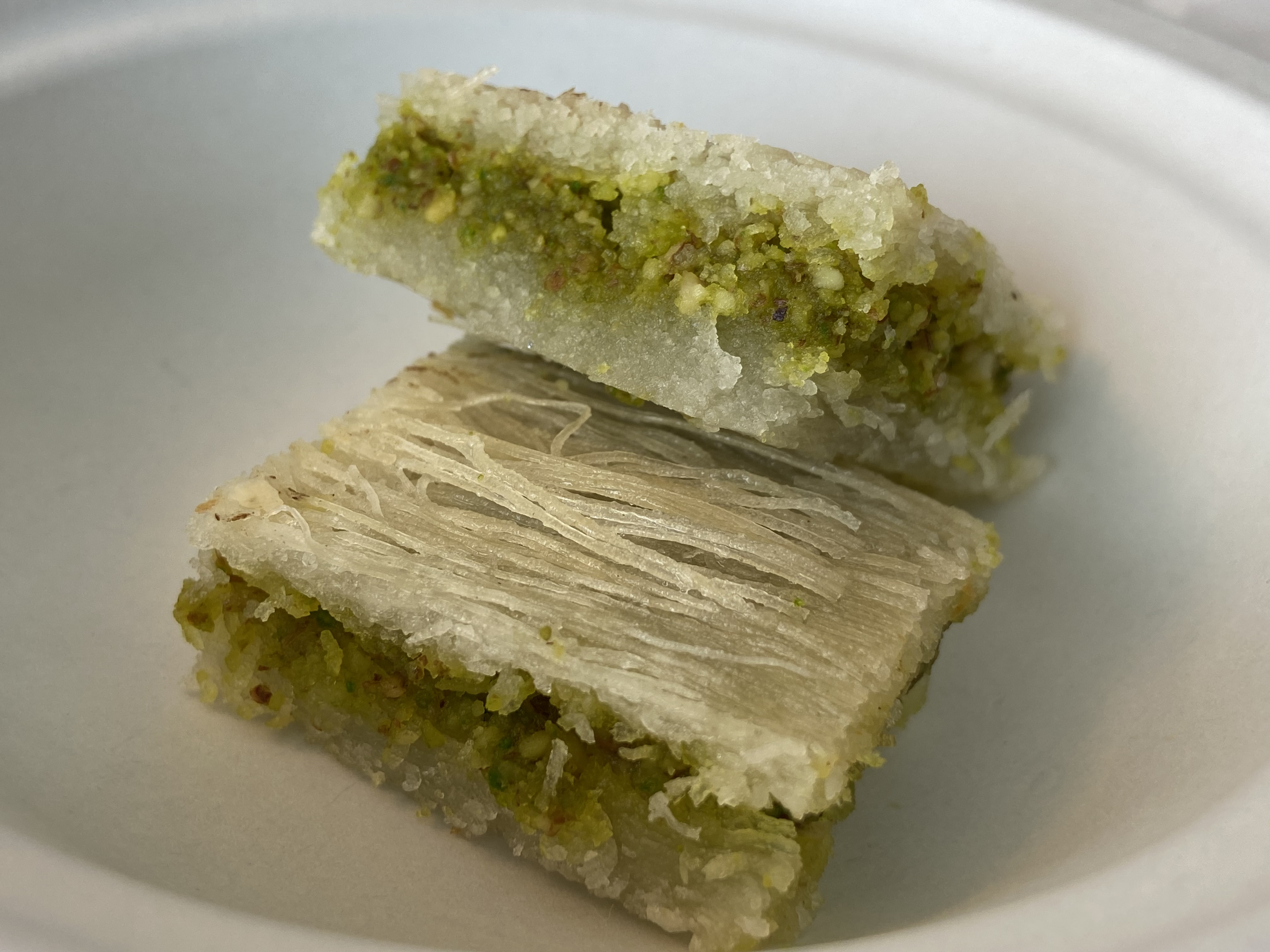
Ballorieh, made with qadaif (knafeh dough) and pistachio filling.

Knafeh basma (Arabic: كنافة بصمة, derived from the Turkish word for "pressed") is a "baklava-like cake" made by pressing a layer of filling between two layers of kadayif pastry. This variety is attested as early as 1885.

Balluriyeh (Arabic: بلورية, lit. 'crystalline', named for its light-colored pastry) is a variety of knafeh basma that is dense and made with white strands of kadayif and filled with pistachios, sometimes flavored with rose water of milk. It is sometimes considered a variety of baklava, and sometimes considered a variety of knafeh.

=== Sandwiched knafeh ===
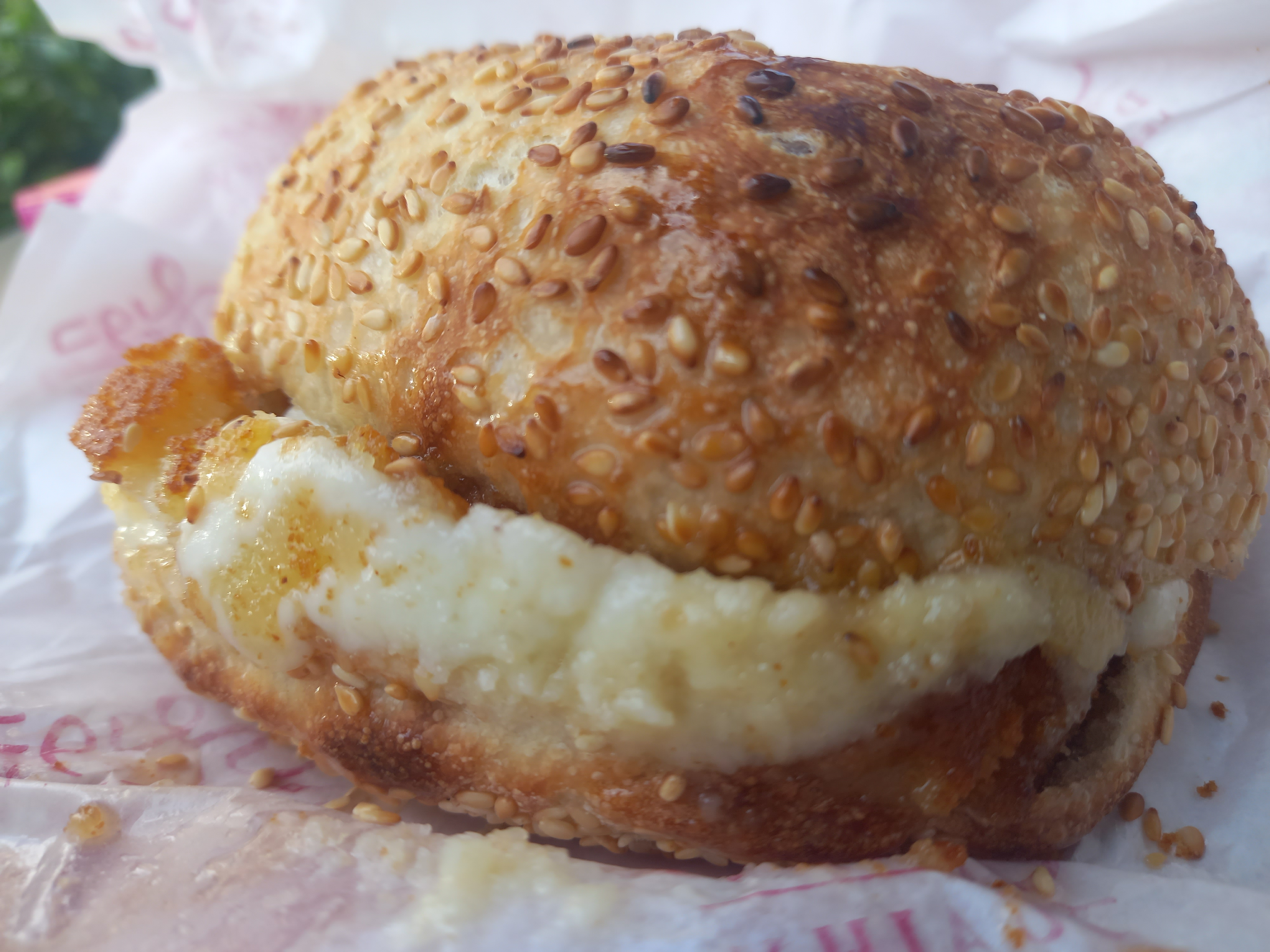
Lebanese ka'ak with knafeh

In Lebanon, kaak knafeh is a popular street food, its made of a knafeh sandwiched in sesame-coated bread.

In Nablus, knafeh is sandwiched in pita bread and eaten for breakfast.

=== Knafeh madlouqa ===
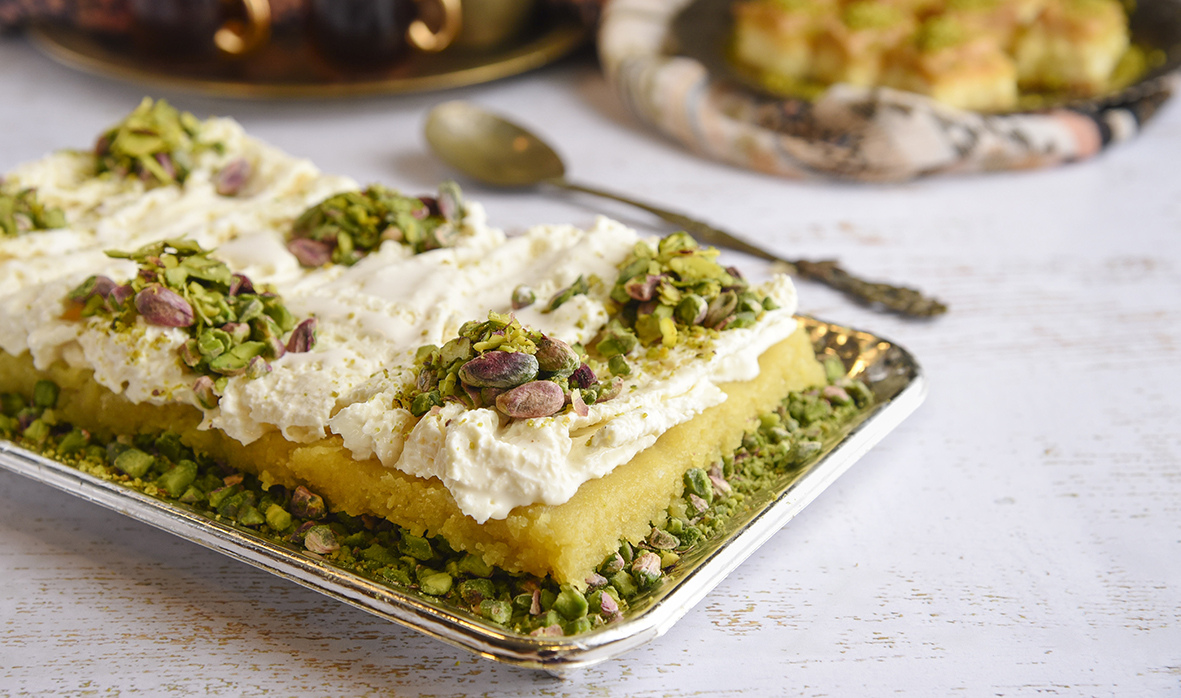
Levantine madlouqa

Knafeh madlouqa (Arabic: كنافة مدلوقة) is a Levantine dessert made of a layer of finely-shredded knafeh dough that is cooked in samneh and topped with qishta or kaymak. The knafeh pastry in the bottom layer is sometimes replaced with semolina.

It is attested as early as 1936 in the journal of The Palestine Oriental Society, which stated "Madlüqah is knafeh with cream (qashtah) and ground pistachios (fustuq)."

== Preparation ==
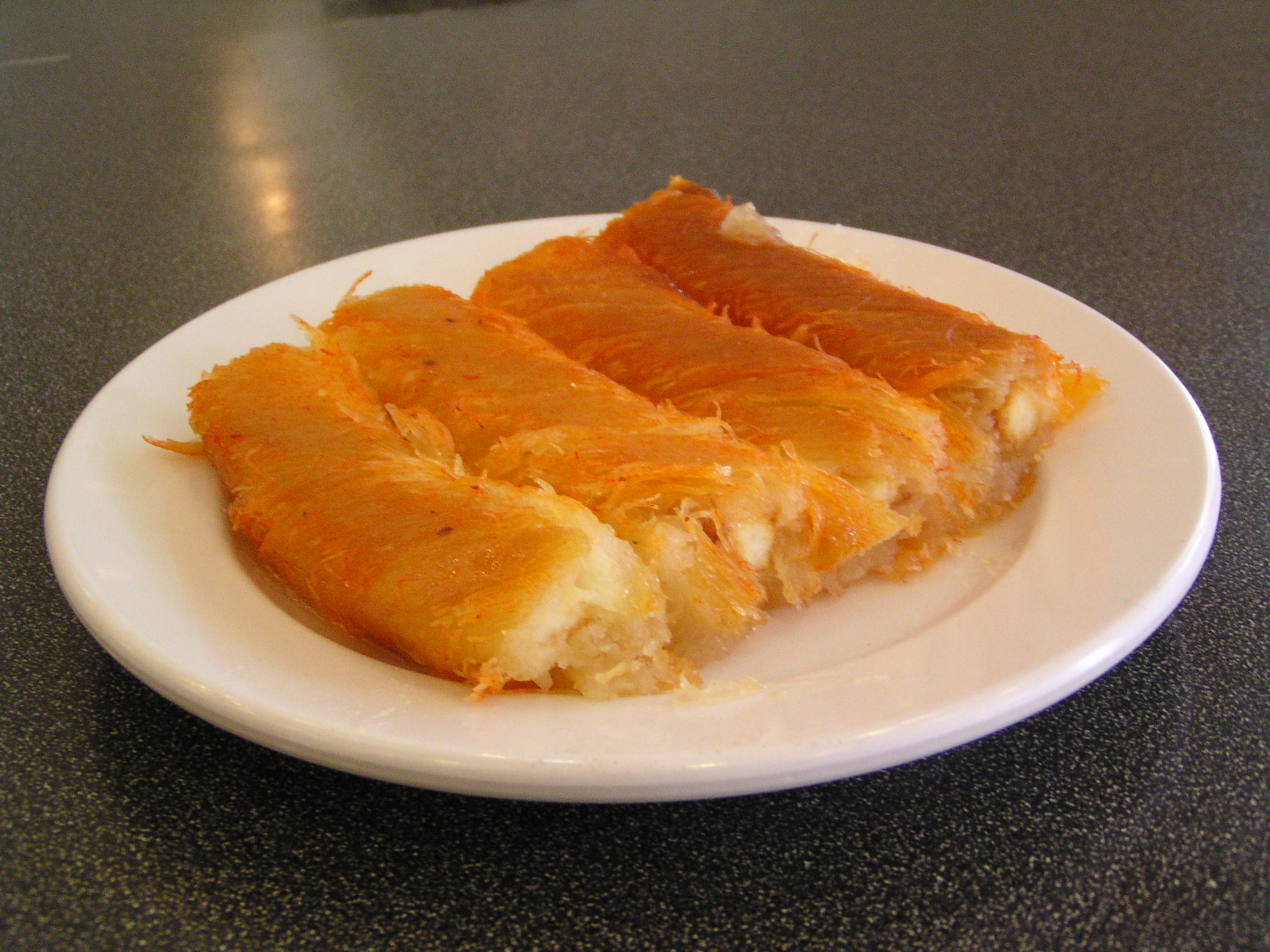
Mabruma (twined) knafeh

There are several types of knafeh pastry:

- khishnah (Arabic: خشنة, rough): a crust made from long thin noodle threads.
- nāʿimah (Arabic: ناعمة, fine): a semolina dough.
- muhayara (Arabic: محيرة, mixed): a mixture of khishnah and na'ama.
- mabruma (Arabic: مبرومة, twined): a noodle pastry

The knafeh pastry is heated in butter, margarine, palm oil, or traditional semneh, spread with soft sweet cheese, such as Nabulsi cheese, and topped with additional pastry. In khishnah knafeh the cheese is rolled in the pastry. During the final minutes of cooking, thick sweet sugar syrup, water, and a few drops of rose water or orange blossom water are poured on the pastry. The top layer of pastry is sometimes tinted red or orange, and crushed pistachios are often sprinkled as a garnish.

Besides cheese, common fillings include nuts or cream, such as qishta which is used in osmalieh.

== Politics ==
=== Israel-Palestine ===
Today, knafeh is served throughout the Middle East, although it is "particularly associated with Nablus" and considered a "cultural touchstone for Palestinian identity".

Knafeh is popular in Israel and prepared by many Israeli eateries and chefs. Some Palestinians have criticized the presentation of knafeh as an Israeli food without reference to its Arab origins as cultural appropriation.

== Culture ==
=== World record ===
The Guinness world record for largest knafeh was set in 2009 in Nablus. It contained 600 kg of Nabulsi cheese, 300 kg of sugar and 35 kg of pistachios. It measured 74 meters in length and weighed 1,765 kg.

== Gallery ==
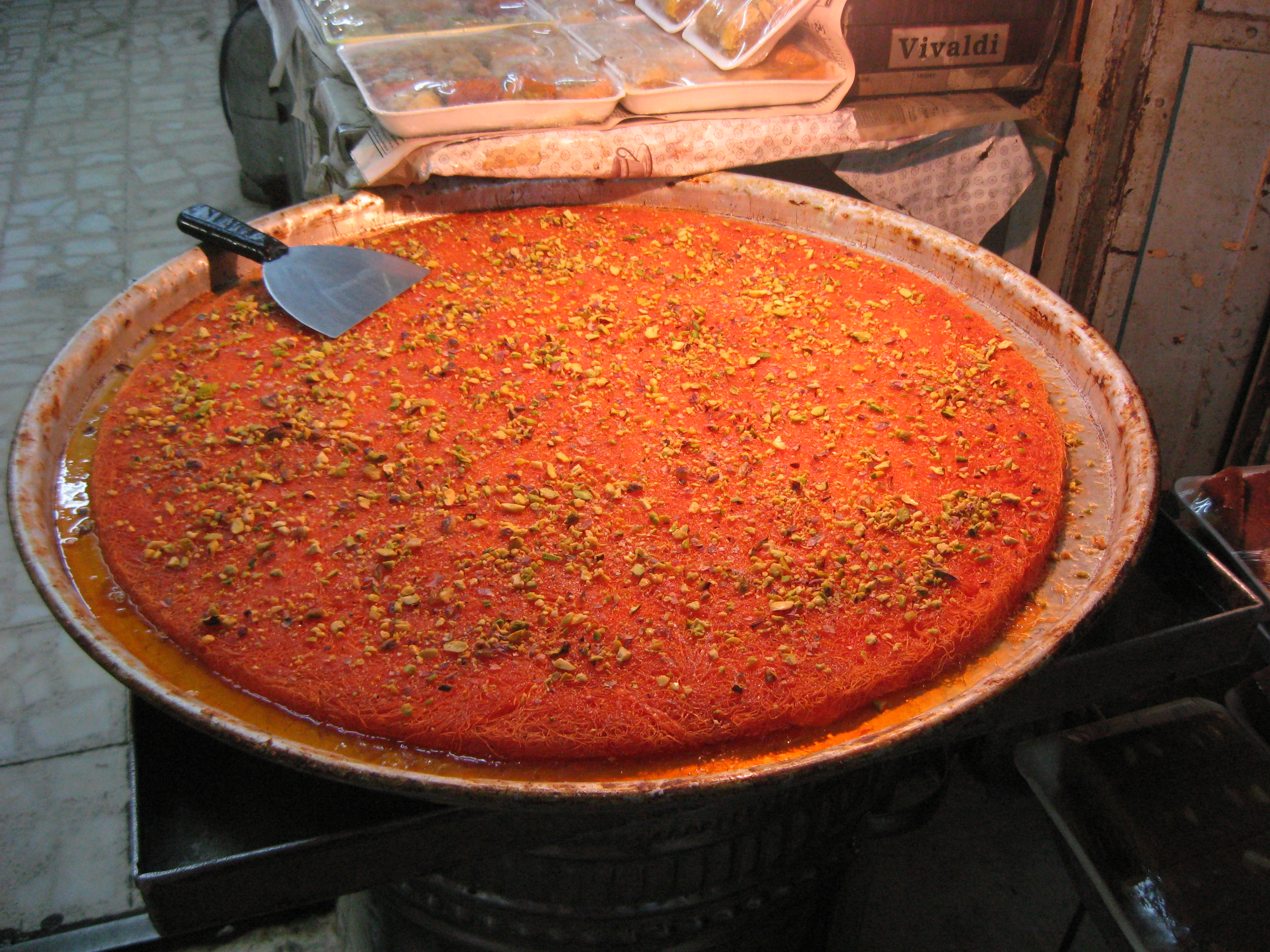
Knafeh served in Jerusalem

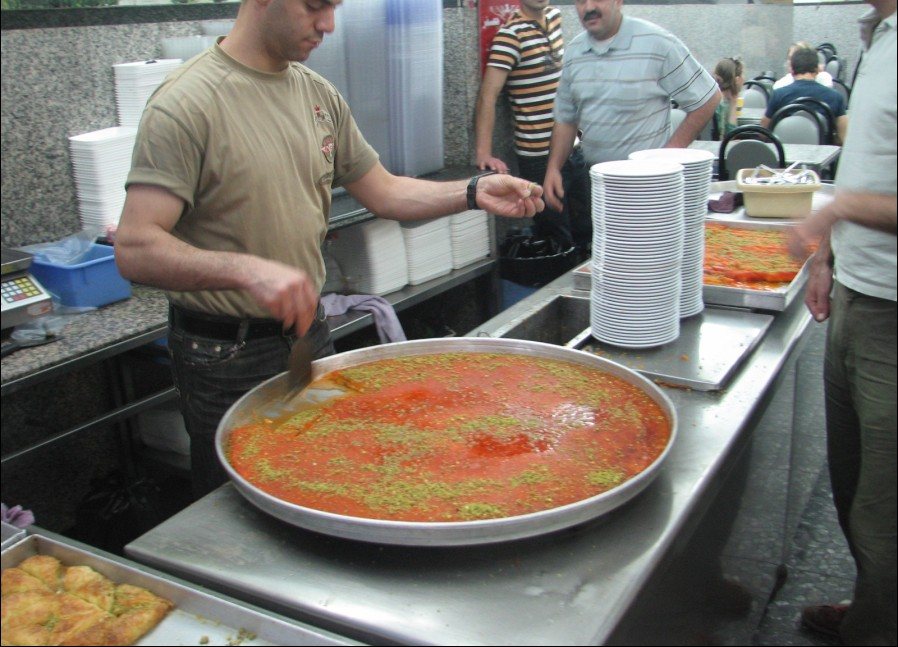
Knafeh shop, old city of Jerusalem

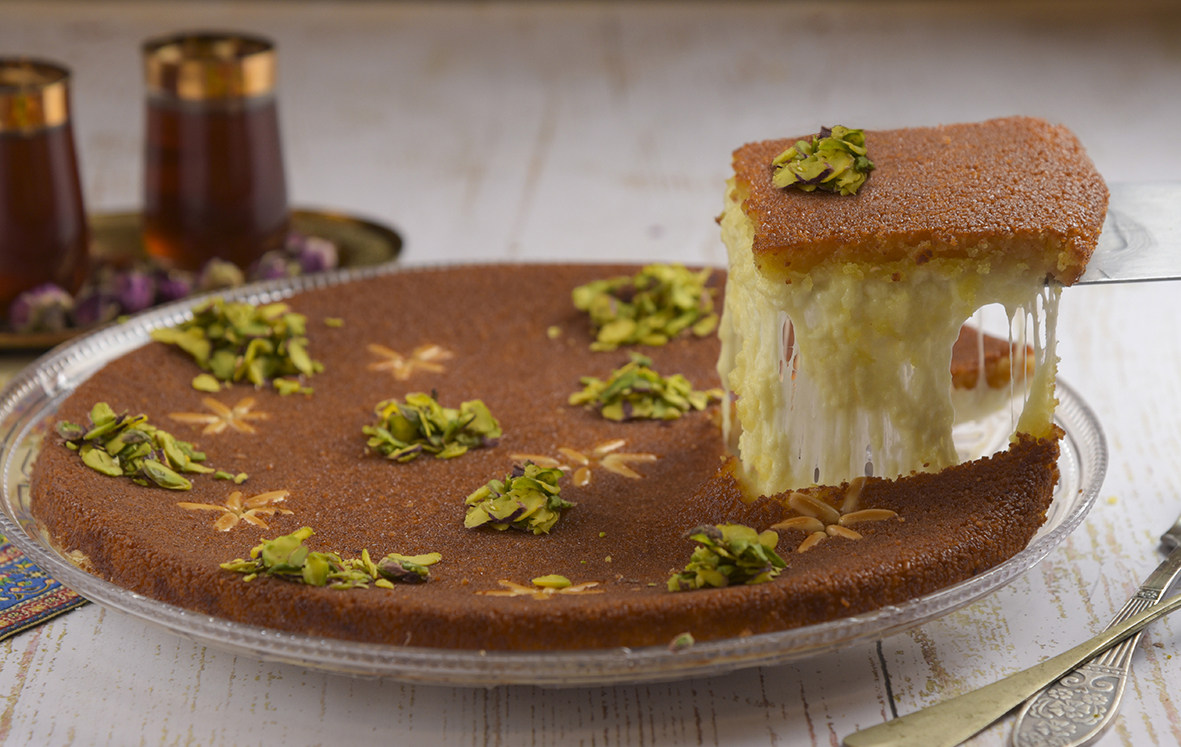
Soft Knafeh filled with Nabulsi cheese

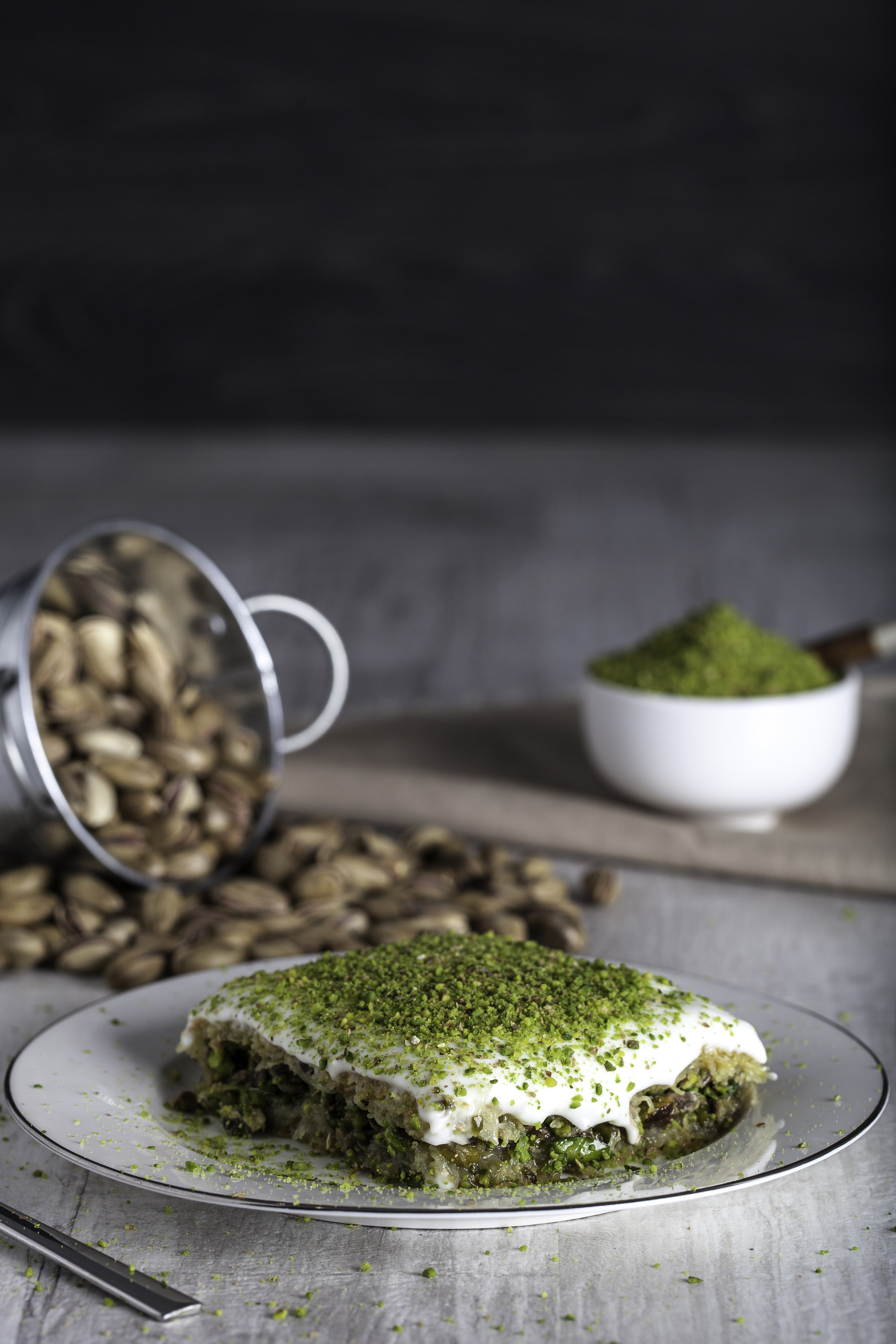
Knafeh coated with pistachio and cream

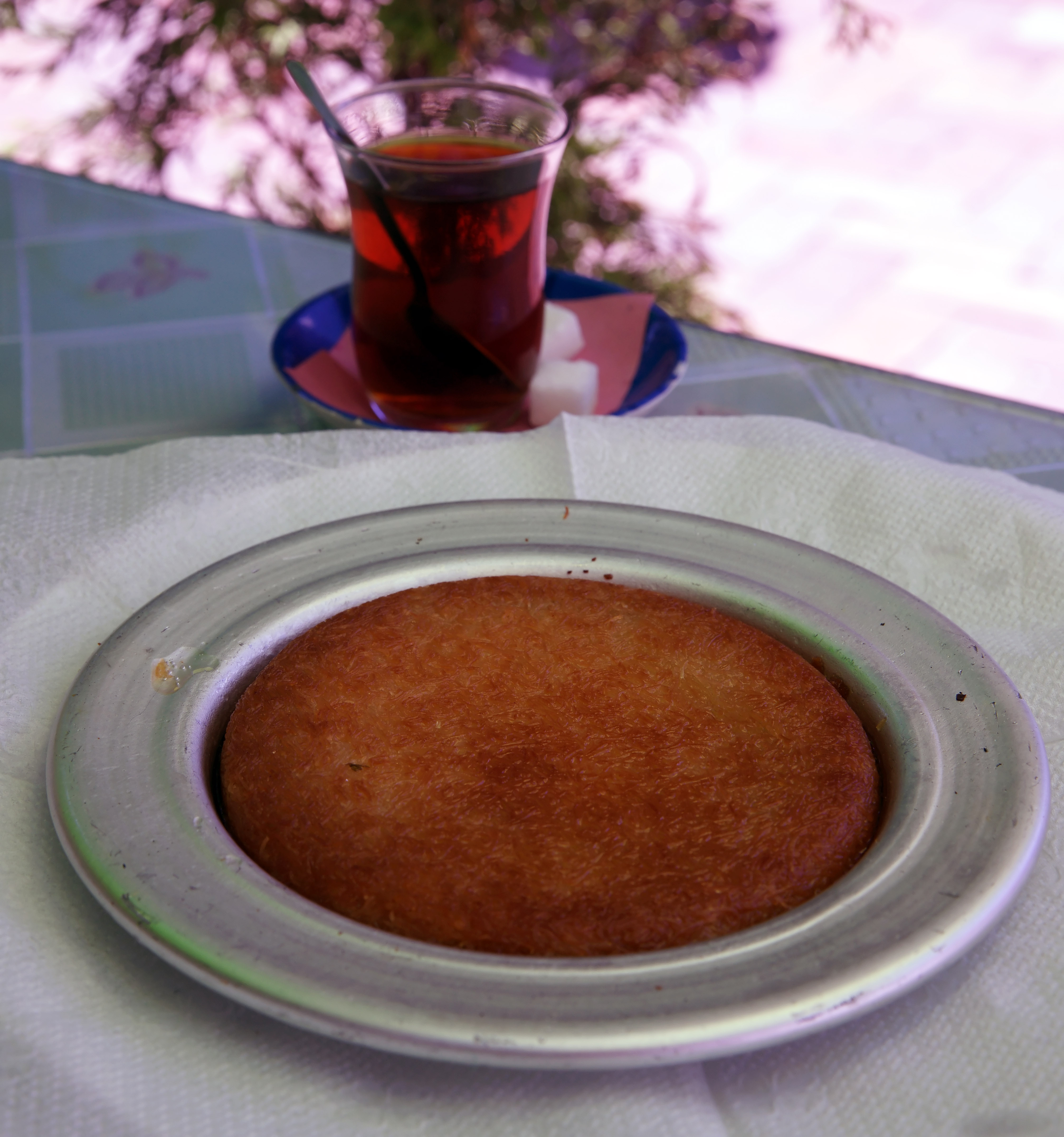
Turkish künefe

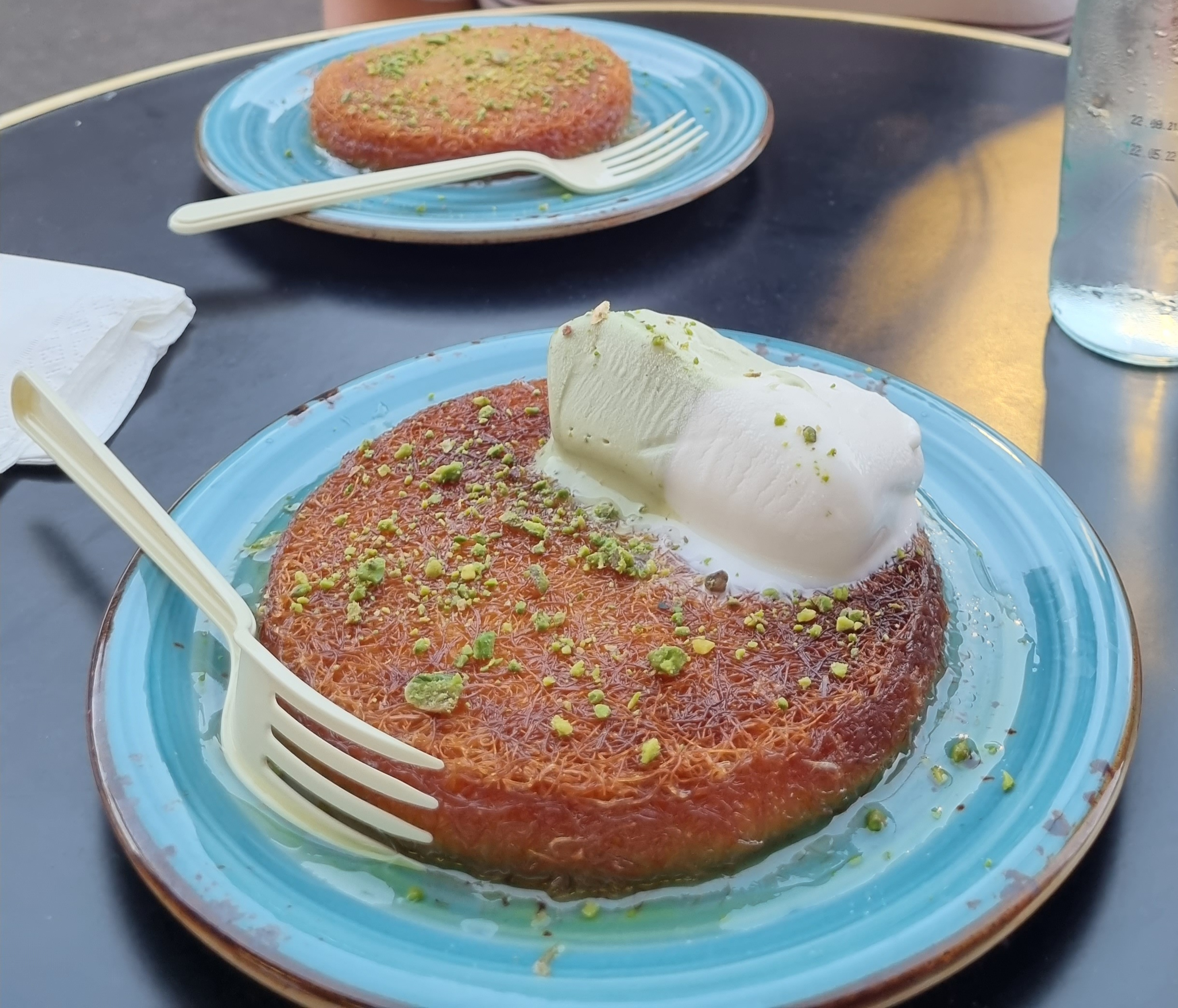
Knafeh served with ice cream

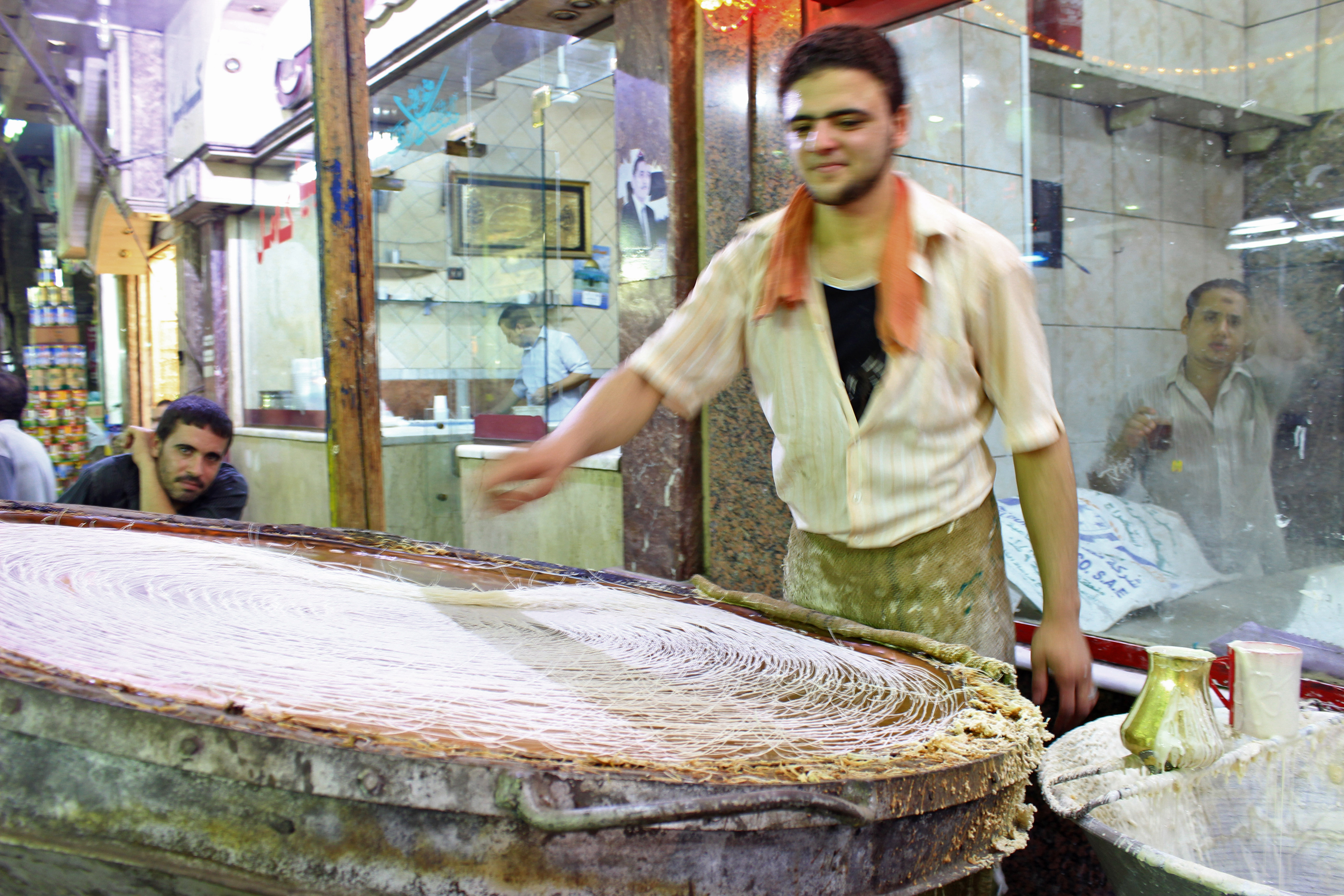
A traditional knafeh maker in Cairo

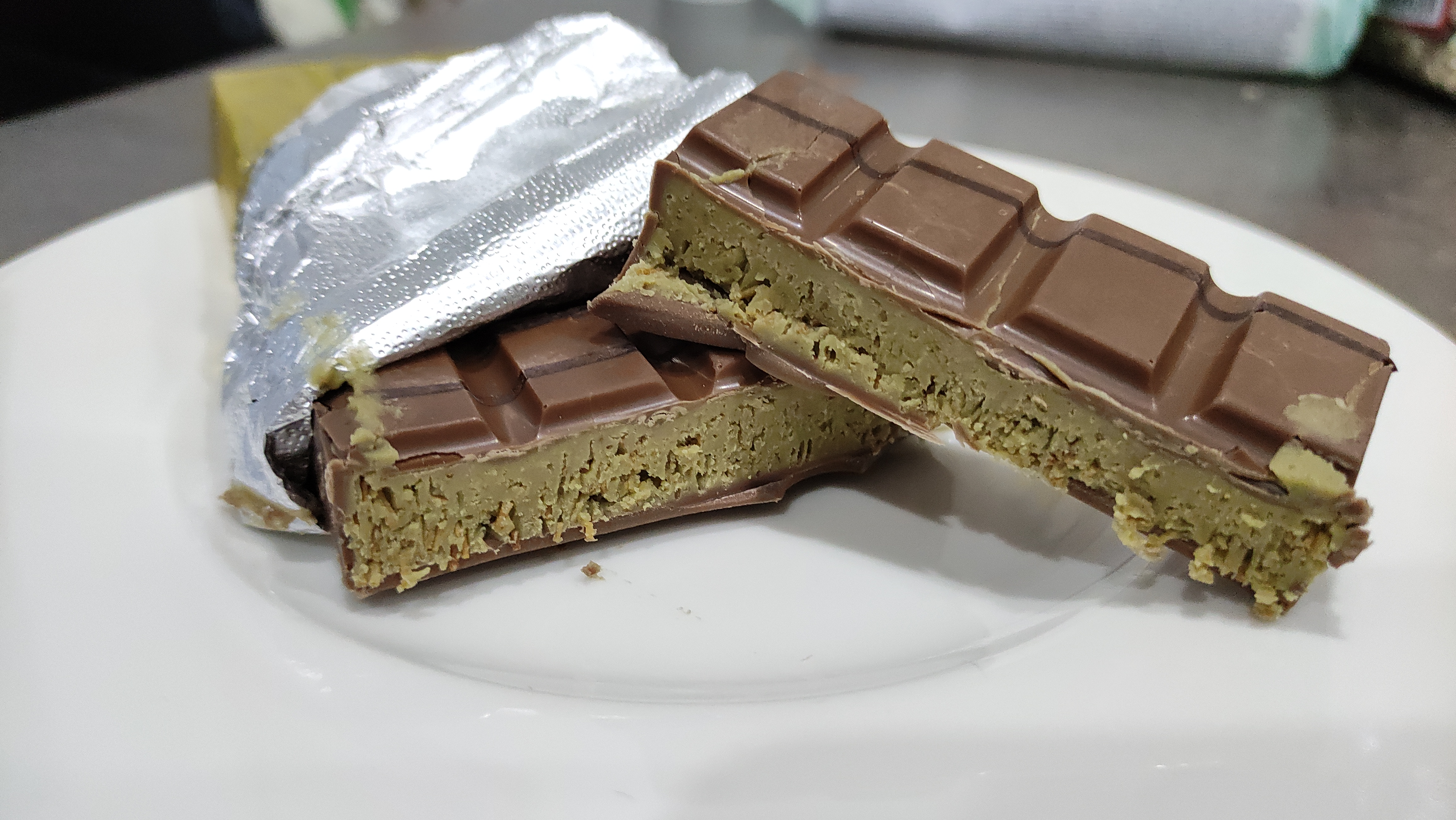
A bar of Dubai chocolate, filled with knafeh and ground pistachios

== See also ==
- List of pastries
- Palestinian cuisine
- Filo
- Qatayef, a dumpling-like confection involving some of the same ingredients
- Kadayif (pastry)
- Outline of kadayif
