= Kadayif =

Middle Eastern pastry dough

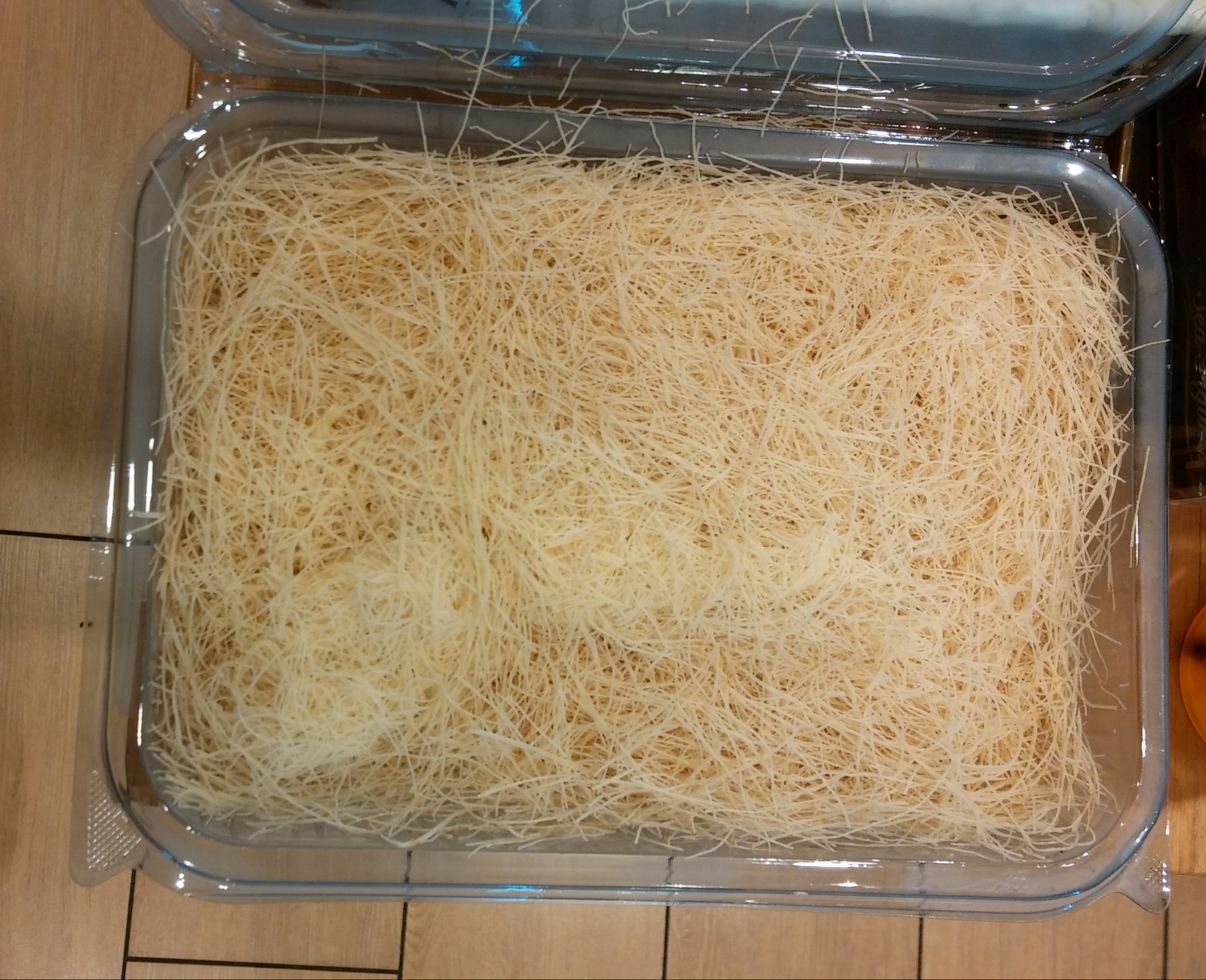
Kadayif strands, used for preparing different desserts, including knafeh and tel kadayıf

Kadaif, kadayif, kadayıf, kataifi, kadaifi, katayef or kataïf (Arabic: قطايف) is a family of Middle Eastern pastry products. In modern usage, kadayif often refers specifically to fine shredded pastry dough used in desserts such as knafeh and tel kadayıf. Depending on context, the term may refer either to the dough itself or to finished desserts made from it.

== Etymology ==
The Turkish word kadayıf derives from Ottoman Turkish قطائف (ḳaṭāyıf / ḳaṭaʿif), from Arabic قطايف (qaṭāʾif). In Arabic culinary usage, qaṭāʾif referred to an older family of pastries, while in Turkish the term later came to denote both the shredded dough and the desserts prepared from it.

== History ==
Kadayif is of Middle Eastern origin. Medieval Arabic qaṭāʾif is generally regarded as an antecedent of Ottoman and Turkish kadayıf forms, which developed into a broader category of pastries and desserts. In Turkish cuisine, kadayıf came to include several distinct preparations, including tel kadayıf and other regional or finished dessert forms.

According to The Oxford Companion to Sugar and Sweets, the oldest known qaṭāʾif appear in a tenth-century Abbasid cookbook. Mary Işın writes that kadayif originated as a griddle cake in medieval Arab cuisine and was transformed in early Ottoman times into pastry threads cooked on a griddle, a form that later spread widely in the Near East. Turkish scholarship likewise treats kadayıf as an Arabic-derived sweet that later developed multiple forms in Seljuk, Ottoman, and modern Turkish cuisine.

== Preparation and usage ==
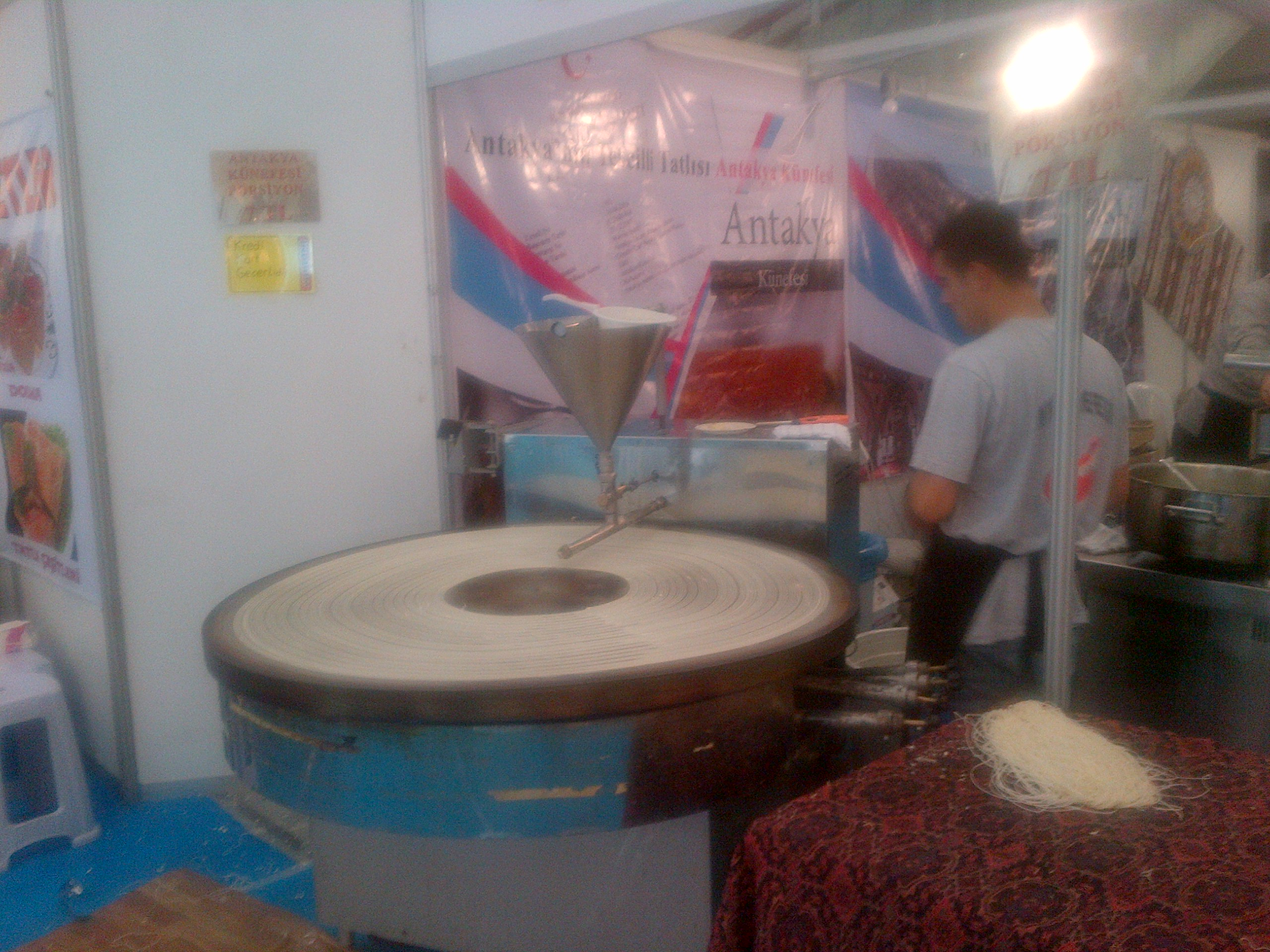
Production of tel kadayıf

Modern tel kadayıf consists of very fine strands resembling vermicelli. It is produced from a thin batter made with special-purpose kadayıf flour, poured through fine openings onto a heated rotating griddle, where it cooks into hair-like strands. These strands may be sold fresh, refrigerated, or frozen as an intermediate product, or used in finished desserts. In Turkey, tel kadayıf is covered by standard 10344/T3 as a semi-processed flour-and-water product.

Finished desserts made from kadayıf strands are typically baked or fried and then soaked in sugar syrup. The strands are also known as kadayif noodles, string kadayif, wire kadayif, tray kadayif, and tel kadayıf, although some of these names are also used for finished desserts.

== Sources ==
- Eckhardt, R. (2017). "Kadayif". Istanbul and Beyond: Exploring the Diverse Cuisines of Turkey. Houghton Mifflin Harcourt. ISBN 978-0-544-44431-7.
- Walczak-Mikołajczakowa, Mariola (2023-04-23). "Turkish Borrowings in Bulgarian Lexis Related to Cuisine and Cooking" (PDF). Przegląd Humanistyczny (66/4): 93–101. doi:10.31338/2657-599X.ph.2022-4.7.
- Krondl, M. (2011). Sweet Invention: A History of Dessert. Chicago Review Press. ISBN 978-1-56976-954-6.
- Seyyedcheraghi, K; Kotancilar, H G; Karaoglu, M M (2019). "Determination of acrylamide and hydroxymethylfurfural (HMF) values as affected by frying duration and temperature levels during the preparation of tray kadayif dessert". Applied Ecology and Environmental Research. 17 (2): 4007–4017. Bibcode:2019ApEER..17.4007S. doi:10.15666/aeer/1702_40074017.
- Bezirgan, Muammer (2024-06-06), Turkish Desserts and the Place of Desserts in Turkish Cuisine (PDF), doi:10.5281/ZENODO.11509656, ISBN 978-2-38236-680-6
- Başar, Burak; Boz, Hüseyin (2023-05-04). "Effect of different oils and sugar syrups on the properties of tray kadayif (traditional Turkish dessert)". Journal of Ethnic Foods. 10 (1) 13. doi:10.1186/s42779-023-00178-3. ISSN 2352-6181.
- Savlak, Nazlı Yeyinli; Köse, Ergun (2013). "Bazı Özel Amaçlı Unların Kalite Özellikleri" [Quality Characteristics of Some Special Purpose Flours]. Akademik Gıda (in Turkish). 11 (2): 125–130.
