= Kahi (food) =

Iraqi sweet breakfast dish

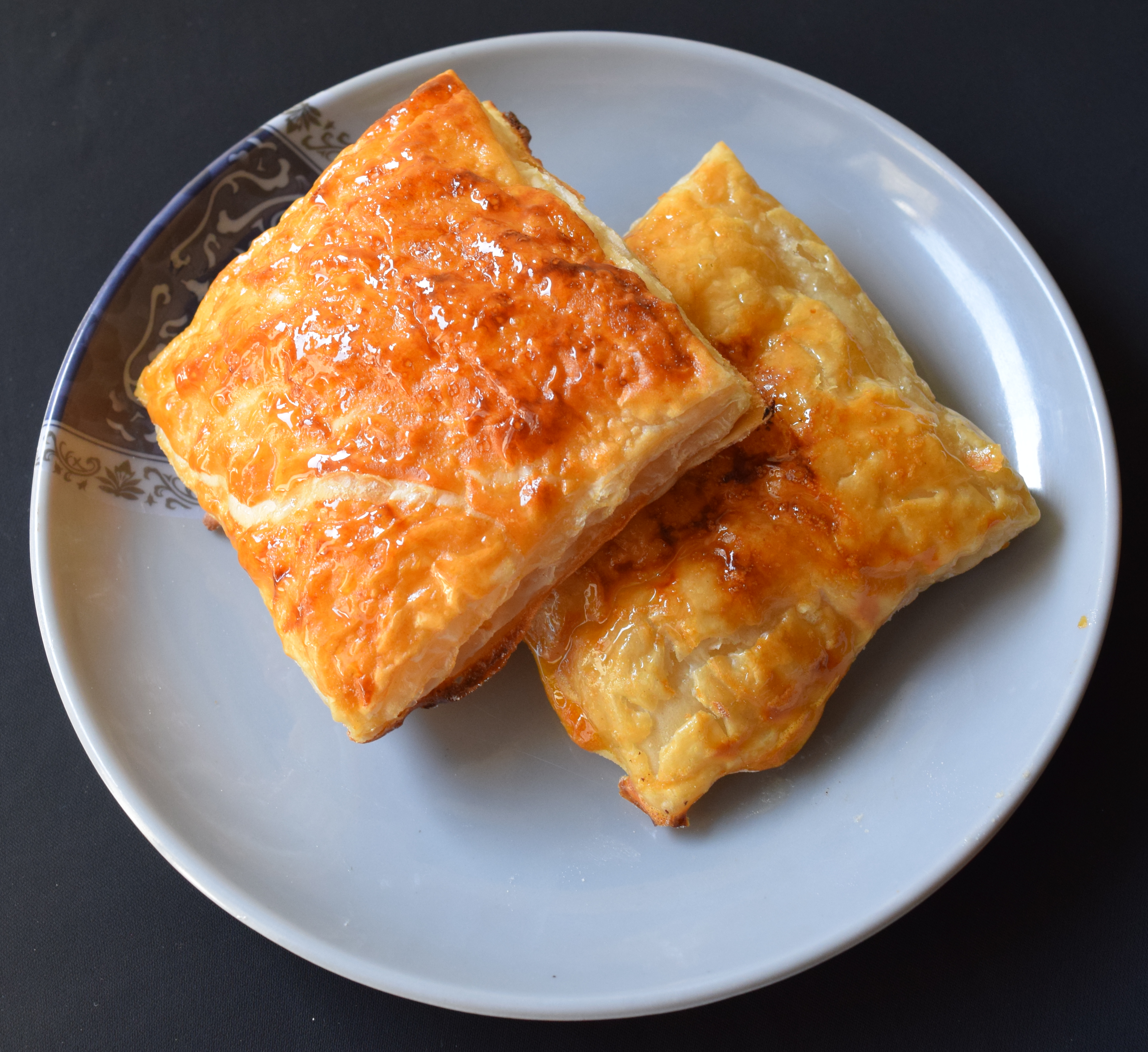
- Kahi without geymar
- Type: Sweet pastry
- Place of origin: Iraq
- Region or state: Iraq
- Associated cuisine: Iraqi cuisine
- Main ingredients: Filo, geymar
- Ingredients generally used: Syrup or honey

Kahi (Arabic: كاهي) is an Iraqi breakfast dish made from layered flaky filo pastry often served for breakfast with a type of clotted cream called geymar (Arabic: قيمر), which is made from water buffalo milk. It is eaten on religious holidays, it's traditionally eaten in shops specialising in selling kahi, but also sometimes made at home.

== Preparation ==
The pastry is made by covering dough with oil or butter and stretching it thin to create filo pastry, then folding it to create a layered, square-shaped pastry, then frying it, or baking it in a gas oven. After it is taken out of the oven, syrup and geymar are added. Kahi shops begin preparing the pastry after the Fajr prayer. Kahi is traditionally only eaten with geymar. The syrup may also be replaced with honey or dibs (fruit syrup). It is typically sliced before being served. The geymar is prepared overnight using high-fat locall produced water buffalo cream.

== History ==
According to Iraqi food historian Nawal Nasrallah, Kahi has been consumed in Iraq for centuries. Many recipes for desserts made by folding and layering thin dough, baking or frying it, then drenching it in syrup can be found in medieval Arabic cookbooks.

The name "kahi" is attested in Ottoman sources by the 17th century, referring to a multi-layered pastry sold in markets and served at the Ottoman court. Ottoman sources also describe an Egyptian pastry called yağlı kâhı ("buttered kahi"), identified by Evliya Çelebi as a form of mutabbaq.

In Baghdad in the 20s, Iraqi historian Abbas Baghdadi describes bakers making kahi with geymar in 1920s Baghdad, as well as making savory varieties filled with meat and vegetables. The New Arab reported that during the 1940s, there were only 5 kahi shops in the entirety of Baghdad. An early mention of kahi can be found in Iraqi historian Jalal al-Hanafi's 1966 "Dictionary of Baghdadi Industries and crafts". Al-Hanafi described it as a common morning dish in Baghdad that was also served to newly wed couples.

Kahi is similar to the feteer meshaltet, found in Egyptian cuisine.

== Culture ==
Kahi and geymar is eaten by Iraqis regardless of religion or ethnicity. The consumption of kahi is treated as a social event. Iraqi Muslims eat kahi on breakfast to celebrate Eid al-Fitr typically after the Eid prayers on the first day, as well as on Fridays, and other official holidays. Baghdadi Jews and the Iraqi Jewish diaspora celebrate Shavuot by preparing kahi at home eating it with geymar. Kahi is also served during some wedding festivities.

Beside being prepared in specialized shops, it is also traditionally prepared by women at home. Kahi is an especially common breakfast during winter.

It is particularly associated with the city of Baghdad, but is found in other cities like Kirkuk, Erbil, and Kut. Kahi is generally only served during the morning, and is not found in shops after 12pm. Iraqi diplomat Amin al-Mumayyiz likens it to Mille-feuille.

== Health concerns ==
The high fat and calorie contents of kahi have prompted health concerns among some health professionals.

== Gallery ==
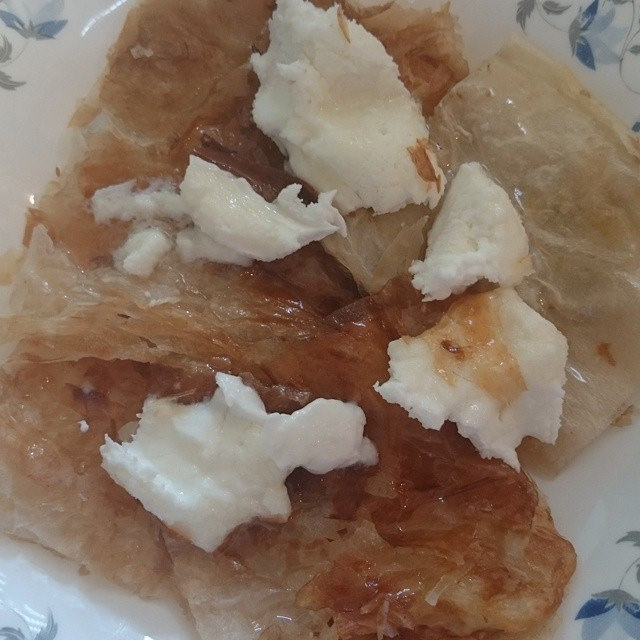
Kahi topped with geymar.

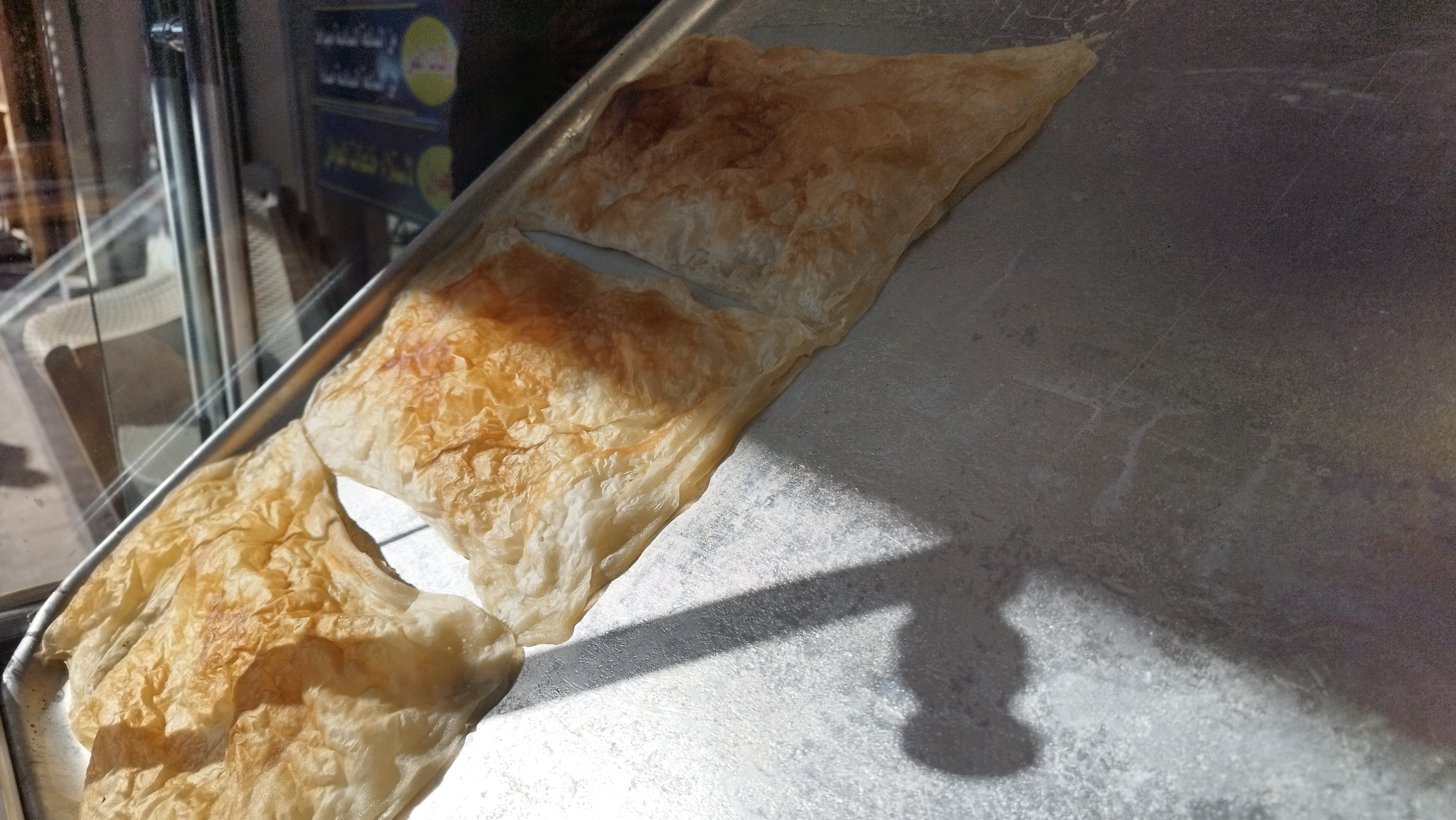
A sheet pan of baked kahi.

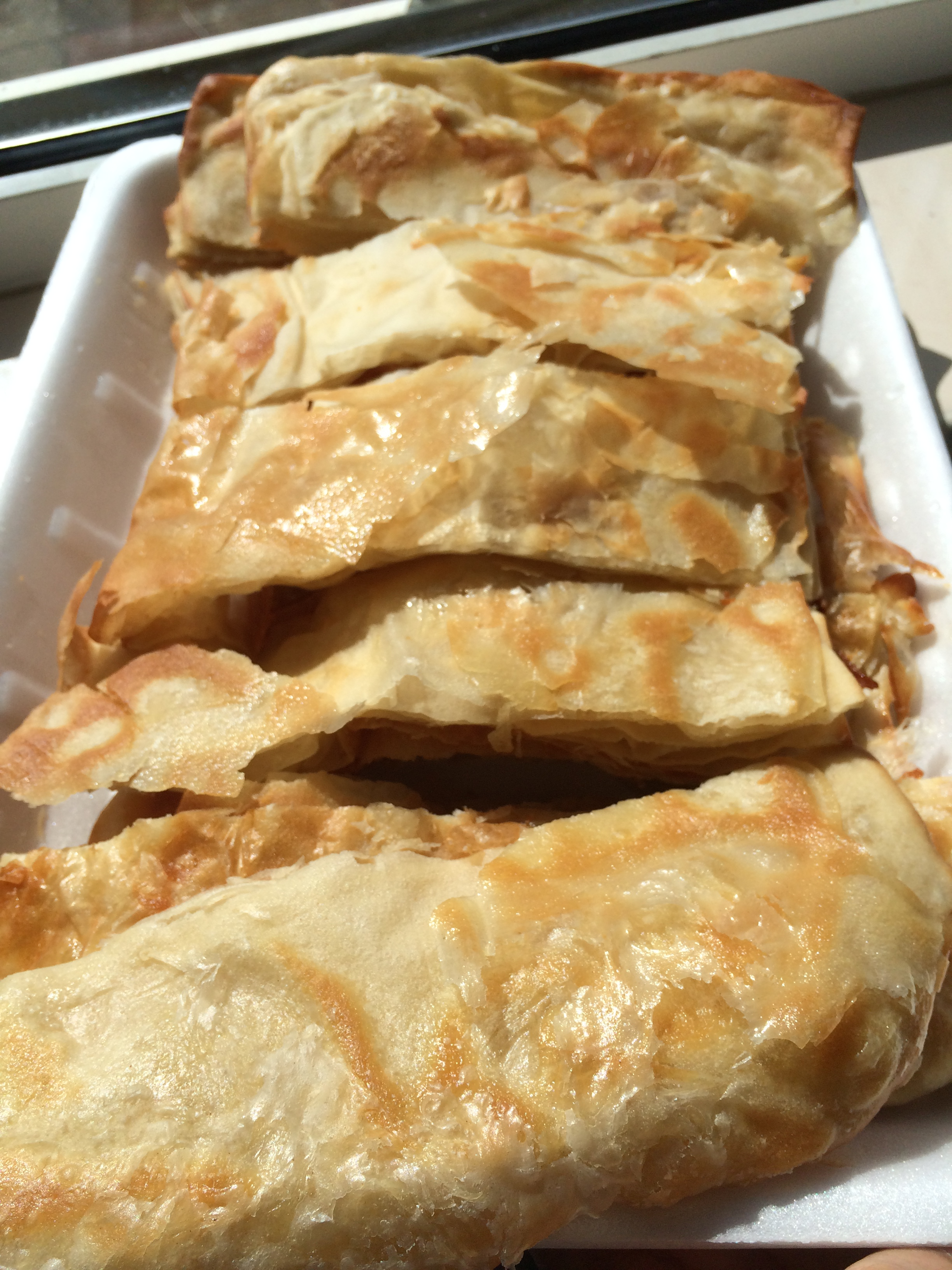
Sliced kahi.

== See also ==
- List of breakfast foods
- Mutabbaq, a sweet Arab dish made of layered pastry
- Tamriyeh, fried cream-filled filo pastry sometimes served for breakfast
- Warbat, a middle eastern dish of filo pastry and cream
- Znoud el-sit, a fried dessert of filo stuffed with cream, common in Iraq
