= Goulash (disambiguation) =

Goulash is a Hungarian stew dish.

Goulash may also refer to:

- American goulash, an American casserole dish
- Goulash (bridge), a style of playing the card game of bridge
- Goulash Communism, a form of communism that existed in Hungary

== See also ==
- Gollash, an Egyptian dish consisting of layers of flaky phyllo dough filled with a savory spiced meat mixture
