= Shamishi =

Traditional Cypriot dessert

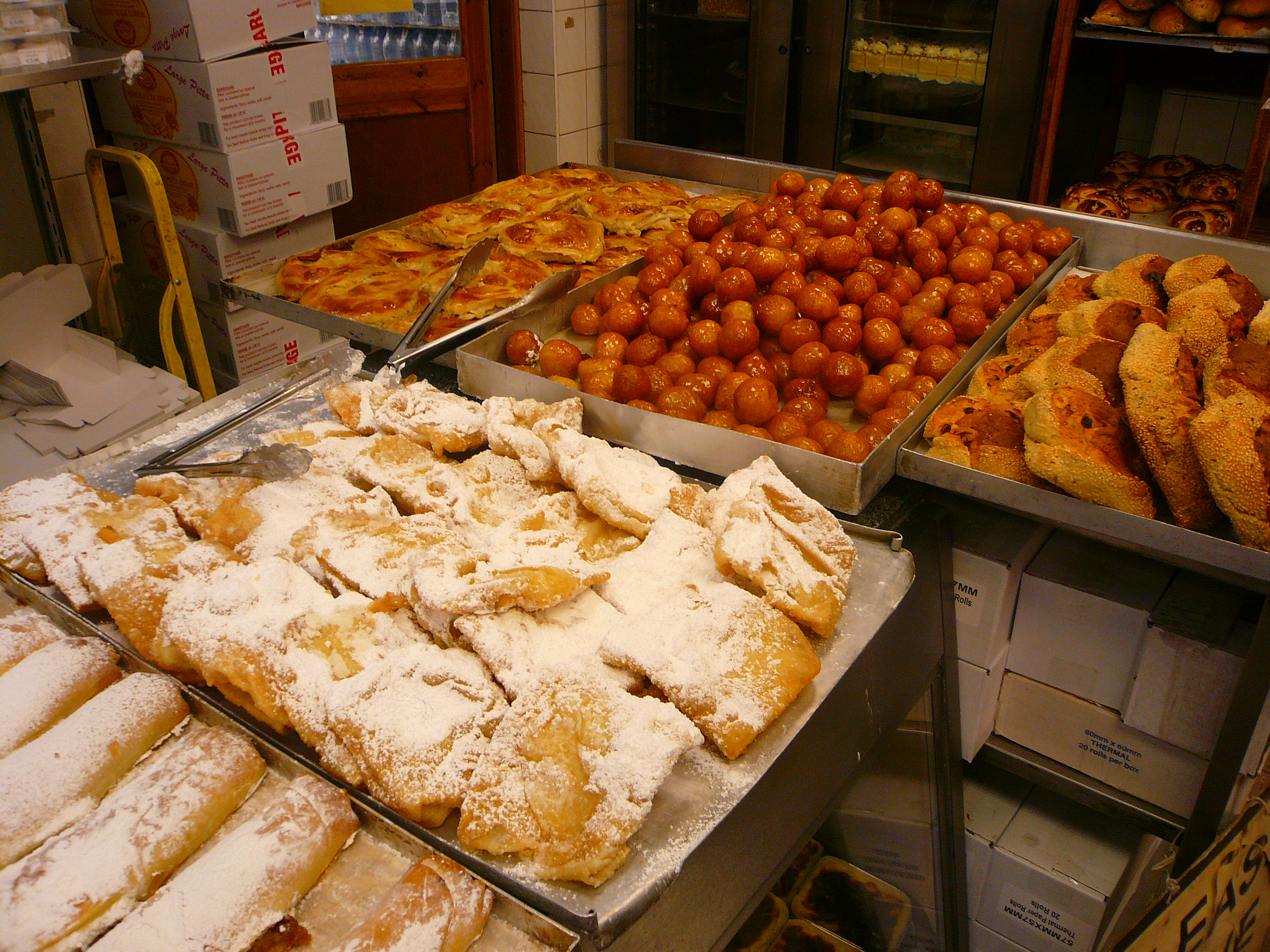
- Shamishi in the middle, dusted with sugar
- Type: Fried dessert
- Course: Dessert

Shamishi (Greek: σιάμισιη, Turkish: Şamişi) is a traditional Cypriot delicacy, which is served usually during name days.

== Etymology ==
The name shamishi (Şamişi) means "work of Damascus."

== Origin ==
Shamishi dates back to Ottoman Cyprus. It is thought to have been influenced by Middle Eastern cuisine, or specficially, Levantine cuisine.

== Information ==
Shamishi are semolina fried pies that have been produced in Cyprus since at least the 19th century and they are considered a traditional delicacy of the cuisine of Cyprus. Shamishi are known as a dessert that is served hot in special occasions such as weddings and local religious feasts usually along with loukoumades and water and it is a variety of fried pastry filled with halva and semolina. In addition to halva and semolina, shamishi includes ingredients like flour, water, sugar, mastic, oil (corn or groundnut oil), salt, among others. The filling is typically semolina pudding.

== Similar dishes ==
=== Tamriyeh ===
Similar desserts like tamriyeh can be found in the Levant region, tamriyeh is a dessert made enveloping thin dough around a semolina pudding filling and then frying it, typically topped with powdered sugar. It is made by Christians on holidays and by Muslims during Ramadan.

== See also ==
- Beignet
- Znoud el-sit
- Levantine cuisine
