= Feteer meshaltet =

Egyptian pastry

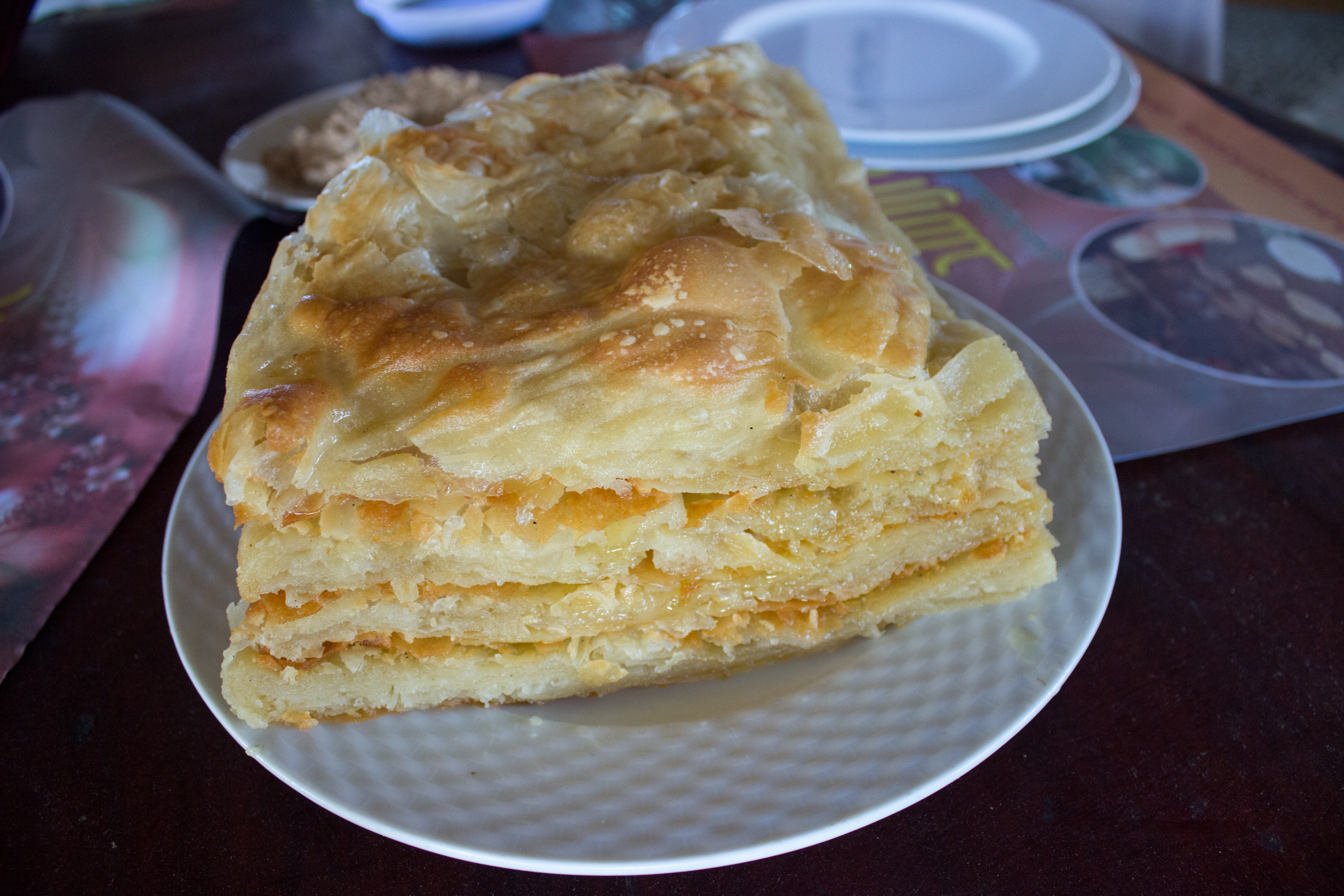
- Place of origin: Egypt
- Serving temperature: Hot or cold
- Main ingredients: Flour, ghee
- Variations: Feteer
- Similar dishes: Filo

Feteer meshaltet (Egyptian Arabic: فطير مشلتت, lit. 'cushioned pie or cushion-like pie', IPA: [fɪˈtˤiːr meˈʃæltet]), often simply referred to as meshaltet (مشلتت), is a traditional Egyptian flaky layered pastry. It is composed of numerous thin layers of dough and ghee. Feteer meshaltet is typically served with sweet or savory accompaniments. Sweet versions are commonly dipped in honey or molasses, or spread with jam, while savory pairings include cheeses such as mish, as well as olives and torshi. Pies made from the same type of dough but prepared with various fillings instead of multiple layers of dough are generally referred to as feteer, distinguishing them from the plain feteer meshaltet.

Feteer meshaltet is considered a symbol of hospitality in Egypt. It was notably served to U.S. President Barack Obama along with Egyptian falafel during his visit to Egypt in June 2009. It is traditionally offered to guests and is commonly prepared for holidays, weddings, and other celebrations.

== Etymology ==
Meshaltet means "thin and flat" in Egyptian Arabic.

== History ==
Feteer meshaltet dates back to ancient Egypt, where it was known as maltoot (Arabic: ملتوت). It was placed in temples as an offering to the gods.

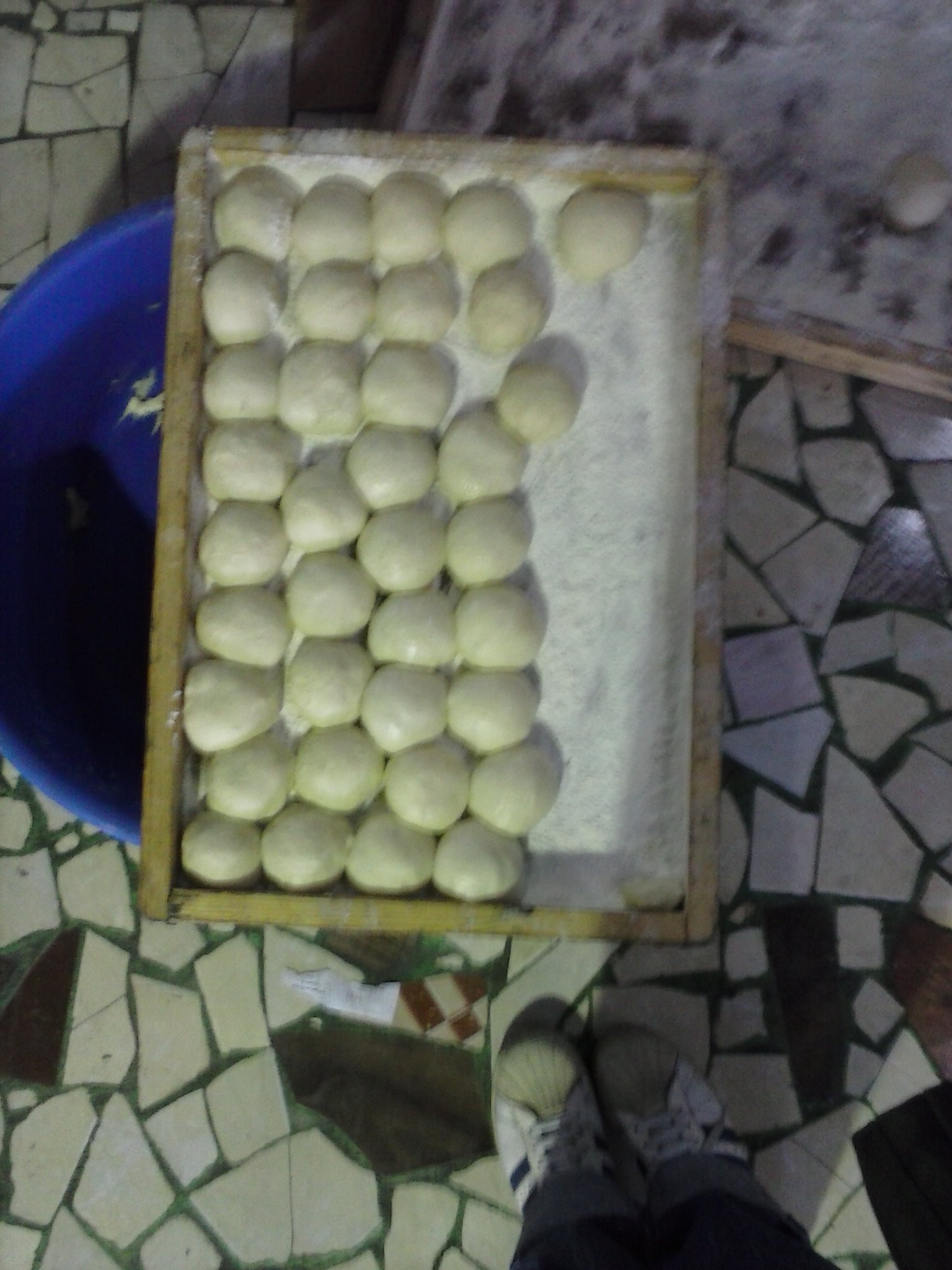
Dough balls prepared for making feteer meshaltet

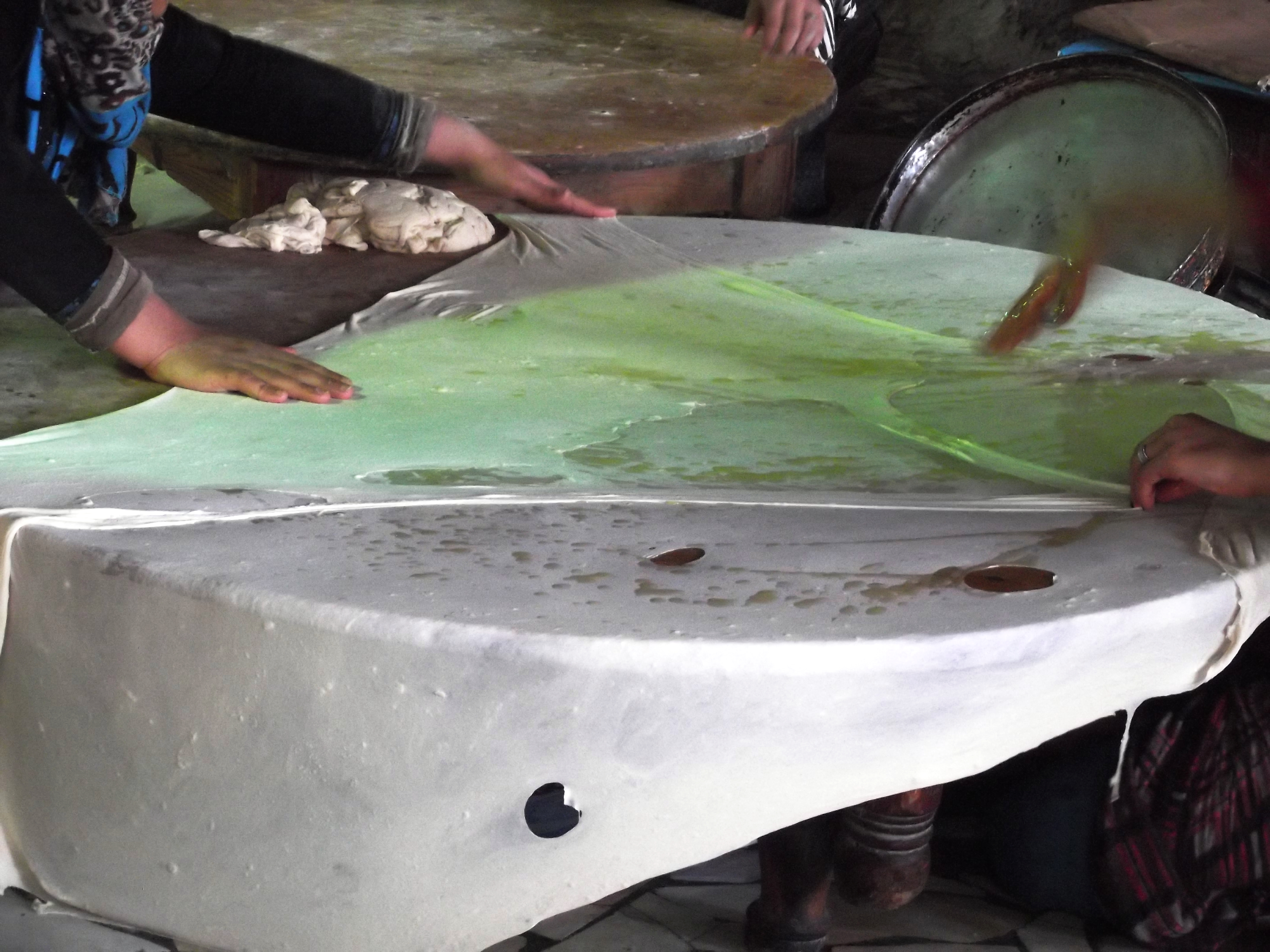
Stretching and layering the dough

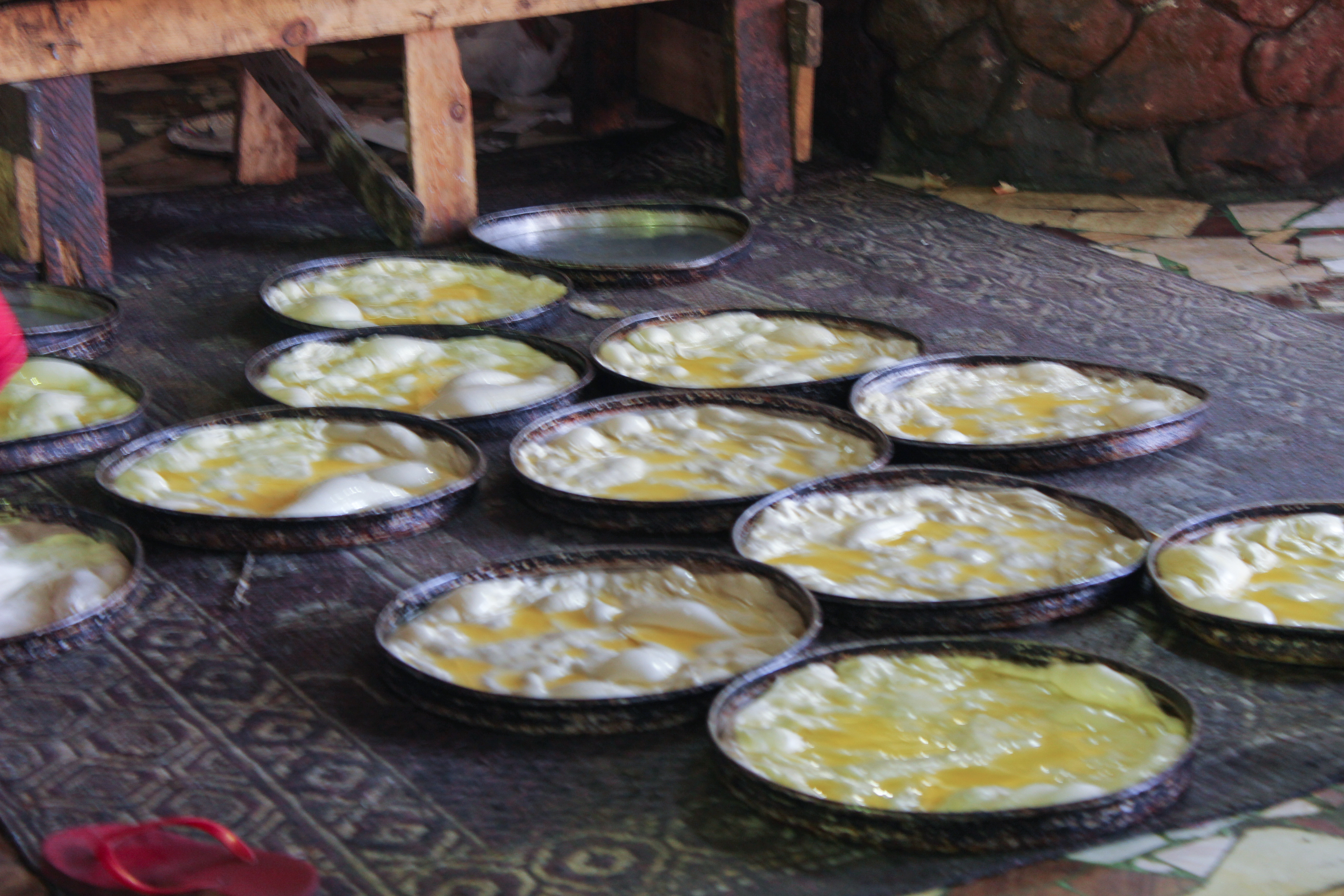
Trays of feteer meshaltet before baking

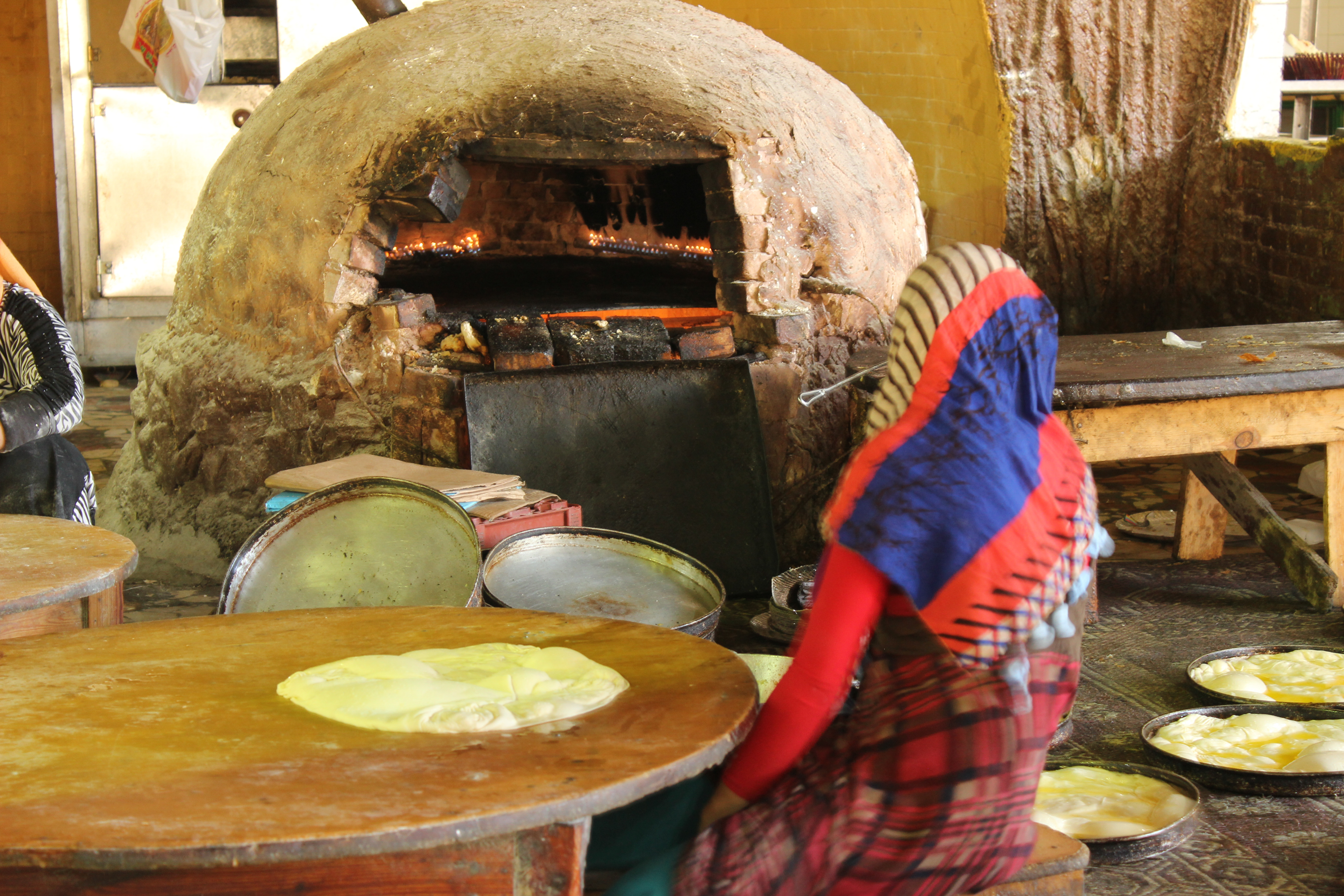
A traditional oven used to bake it

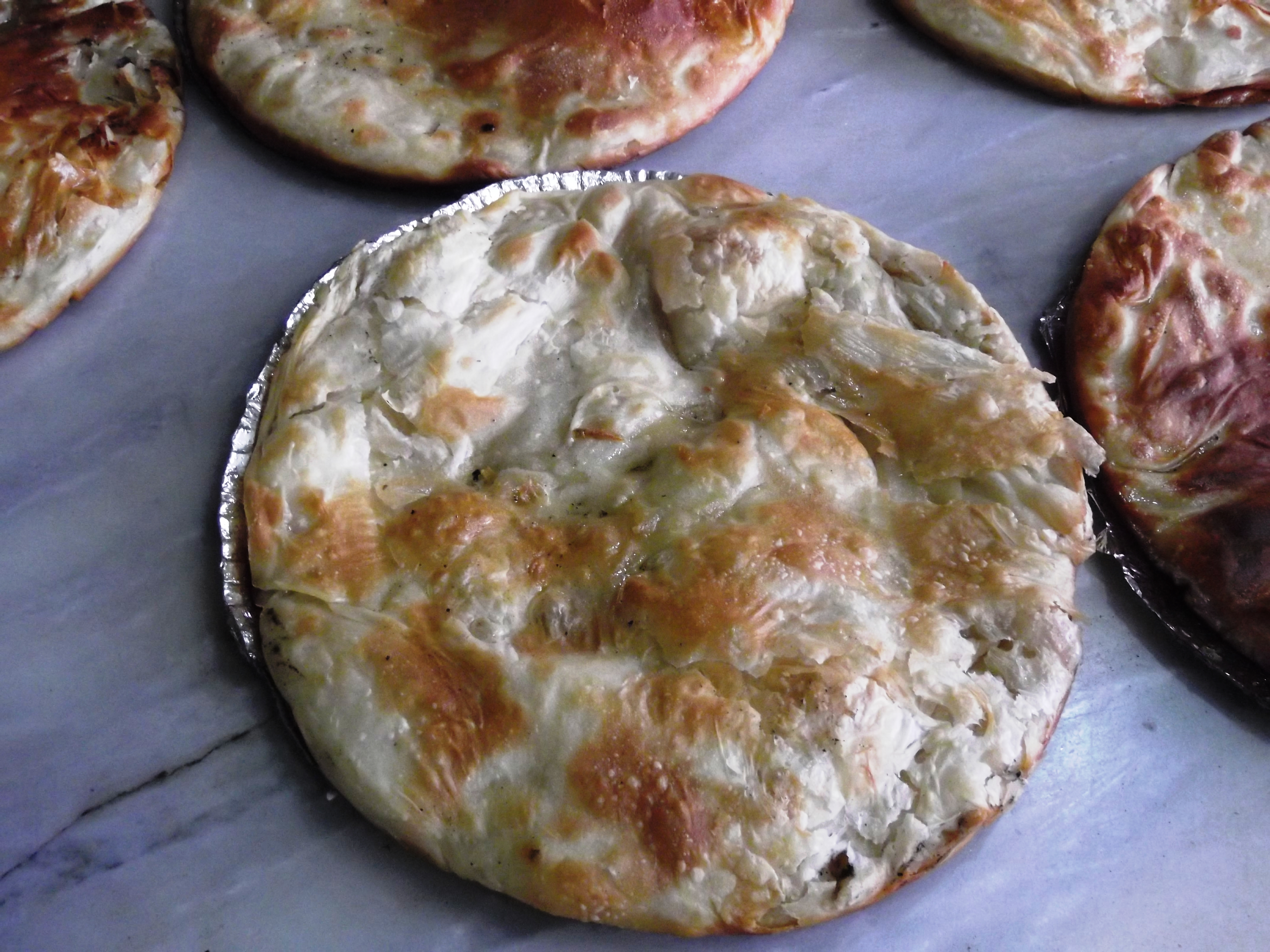
Freshly baked feteer meshaltet

== Related foods ==
=== Palestine ===
A similar baked good called maltoot is traditional in Palestinian cuisine, where it is made using olive oil in rural areas during olive harvest season.

== See also ==
- Egyptian cuisine
- Murtabak
- Fatayer
- Kahi (food), similar Iraqi dish
- Gollash
