= Feteer =

Egyptian pie

Feteer فطير
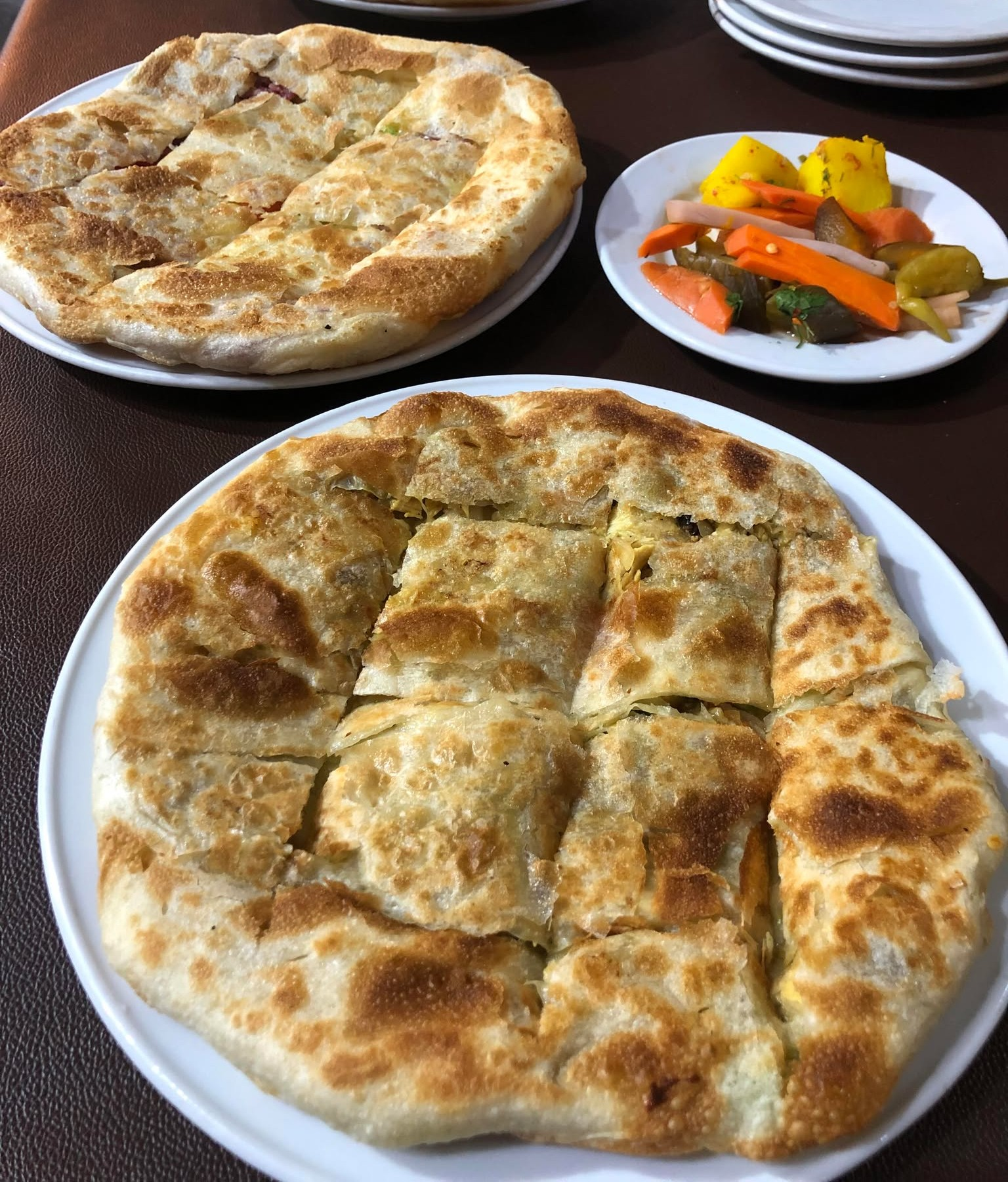
- Savory feteer served with a side of mekhalel
- Type: Pie
- Place of origin: Egypt
- Serving temperature: Savory: Hot; Sweet: Typically cold but may also be served hot
- Main ingredients: Flour, ghee, and various fillings
- Variations: Feteer meshaltet

Feteer (Egyptian Arabic: فطير, lit. 'pie', IPA: [fɪˈtˤiːr]) is a traditional Egyptian pie known for its flaky, layered texture and variety of fillings. It is distinct from feteer meshaltet, a plain, layered pastry typically served without fillings. Feteer is always filled or topped, and due to its adaptability in ingredients and presentation, it is sometimes referred to as an Egyptian version of pizza.

Savory fillings commonly include meats such as ground beef, sausage, Egyptian sogoq or bastirma, as well as shawarma-style seasoned meats. Cheese-based fillings are also popular, often using blends of mozzarella, cheddar, feta, or creamy cheeses such as kiri. Other variations include combinations with vegetables, mushrooms, olives, and peppers.

Sweet varieties are typically filled with ingredients such as chocolate spreads, qishta, nuts, bananas, honey, or sweetened condensed milk, and may be dusted with powdered sugar or drizzled with syrup.

== Preparation ==
Preparation involves stretching dough until extremely thin, then folding it repeatedly, layering it generously with ghee. This creates a delicate, crispy, and flaky texture after baking. Fillings are introduced between the thin layers or placed atop the pastry before baking, depending on the desired outcome.

== Abroad ==
Internationally, Egyptian feteer has become increasingly known, particularly in the United States due to the presence of Egyptian expatriate communities. Some restaurants in New York City and Orlando serve the dish. In California, an establishment offers both traditional Egyptian fillings, such as sojok, and American-inspired toppings like barbecue chicken or spicy chicken with kiri cheese.

== See also ==
- Egyptian cuisine
- Murtabak
- Börek
