= Tamriyeh =

Levantine fried dessert

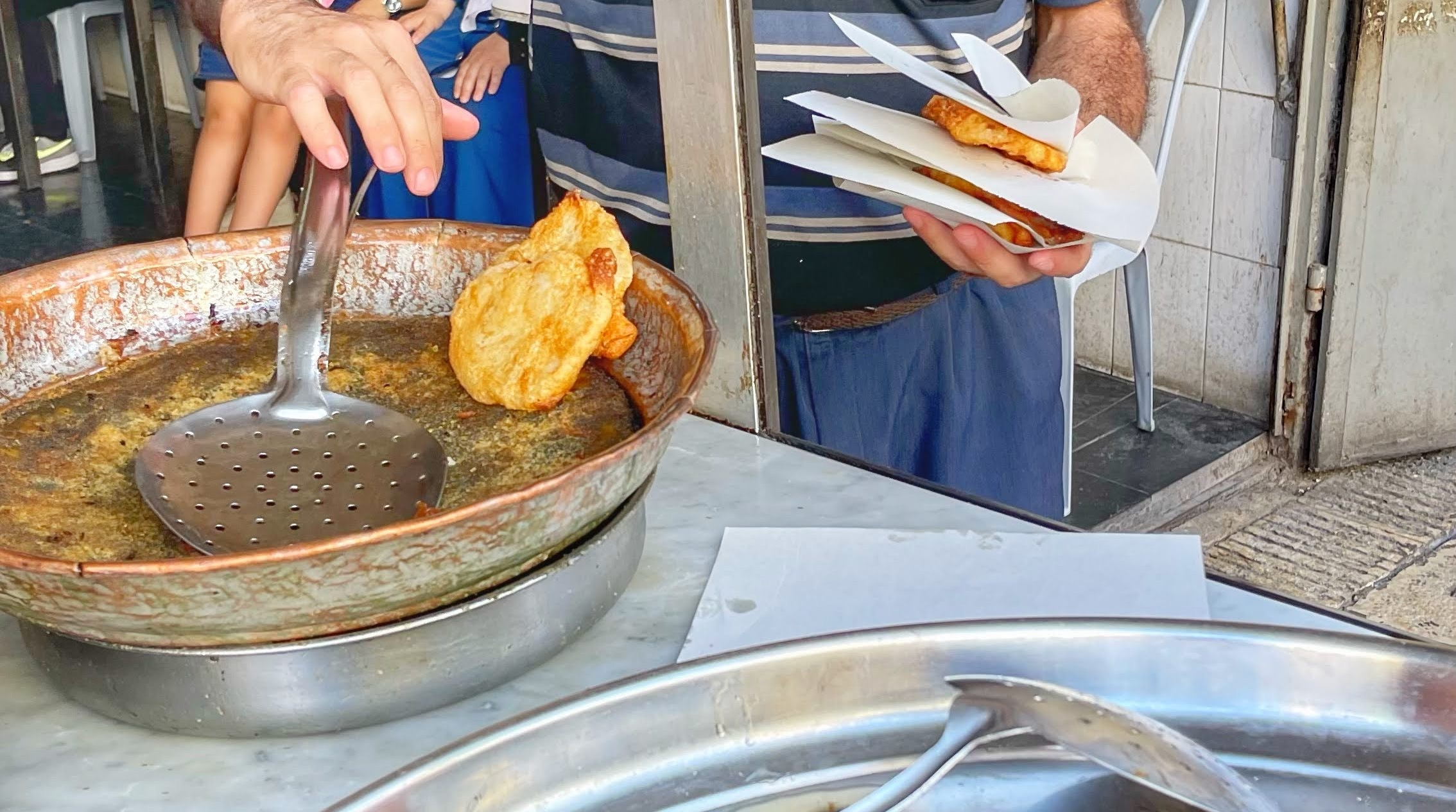
- Tamriyeh in a sweet shop, Nablus
- Type: Fried sweet
- Course: Dessert
- Associated cuisine: Levantine cuisine
- Main ingredients: Filo dough, cream filling, powered sugar or syrup
- Similar dishes: Shamishi, Beignet

Tamriyeh (Arabic: تمرية, romanized: tamriyyah) is a sweet made by enveloping a cream filling (typically semolina pudding) with filo dough then frying it, it is common in cities on the eastern Mediterranean like Nablus in the West Bank, Homs in Syria, Sidon in Lebanon, and Port Said in Egypt. It's exact city of origin is debated.

== Preparation ==
Tamriyeh is made by stretching dough very thin, and then cutting it into smaller squares, which are used to envelope the filling. The filling is typically mastic-flavored semolina pudding, it is topped with crushed pistachio powdered sugar or qatir syrup.

== History ==
The exact origin of the dessert is disputed. It is often said to have originated from the Palestinian city of Nablus, but some tamriyeh vendors in Nablus attribute its origin to Tamra, a village east of Acre. It is believed that tamriyeh spread from Nablus in the West Bank to Port Said in Egypt after the inhabitants of the Suez Canal where displaced during the 1967 Six-Day War.

An early mention of tamriyeh can be found in German Orientalist Gustaf Dalman's 1935 Arbeit und Sitte in Palaestina ("Work and customs in Palestine"), which documented common foods in Palestine at the time. Dalman described a dessert called timriye made by boiling semolina and sugar, cutting the resulting pudding into squares, enveloping it with unleavened rolled out dough, then frying it in sesame oil.

== Etymology ==
The name tamriyeh means "made with dates", despite the fact that some versions of the dessert do not contain dates, the origin of this name is unknown.

In Nablus, it may be called ṭamriyyah (طمرية) instead, the origin of this name is disputed, some state its derived from the Arabic word for "cover" (tamara, طمر), while others associate it with the city of Tamra, near Nablus.

The name tamriyeh is also used to refer to date-filled sweets, like makrouta.

Literary mentions of vendors selling fried sweet donuts called tamriyeh in Lebanon date back to at least 1956.

== Regional varieties ==
Semolina pudding-filled tamriyeh is popular in Jordan, Lebanon, and Palestine.

=== Lebanon ===
In Lebanon, kallaj is a similar related sweet to tamriyeh, it is traditionally made during Ramadan, and is made by frying parcels made of qishta-filled güllaç wafers. Tamriyeh is also common in the city of Sidon.

=== Egypt ===
In Egypt, a distinct variety of tamriyeh is associated with Port Said, where it is regarded as a local popular sweet and a culinary tradition. Egyptian newspapers describe it as having been introduced to the city during the displacement of residents of the Suez Canal cities in 1967, and as originating in Nablus. The sweet is traditionally sold by street vendors, and is most common during winter.

=== Syria ===
In Homs, Syria, tamriyeh is made with a date or qishta filling, or no filling at all (سادة), and is dripped in sugar syrup shortly after its fried. It is primarily associated with the month of Ramadan. The dough is typically prepared a day in advance, generally by mixing flour, butter (or samneh), and water with the aim of creating an elastic dough.

=== Palestine ===
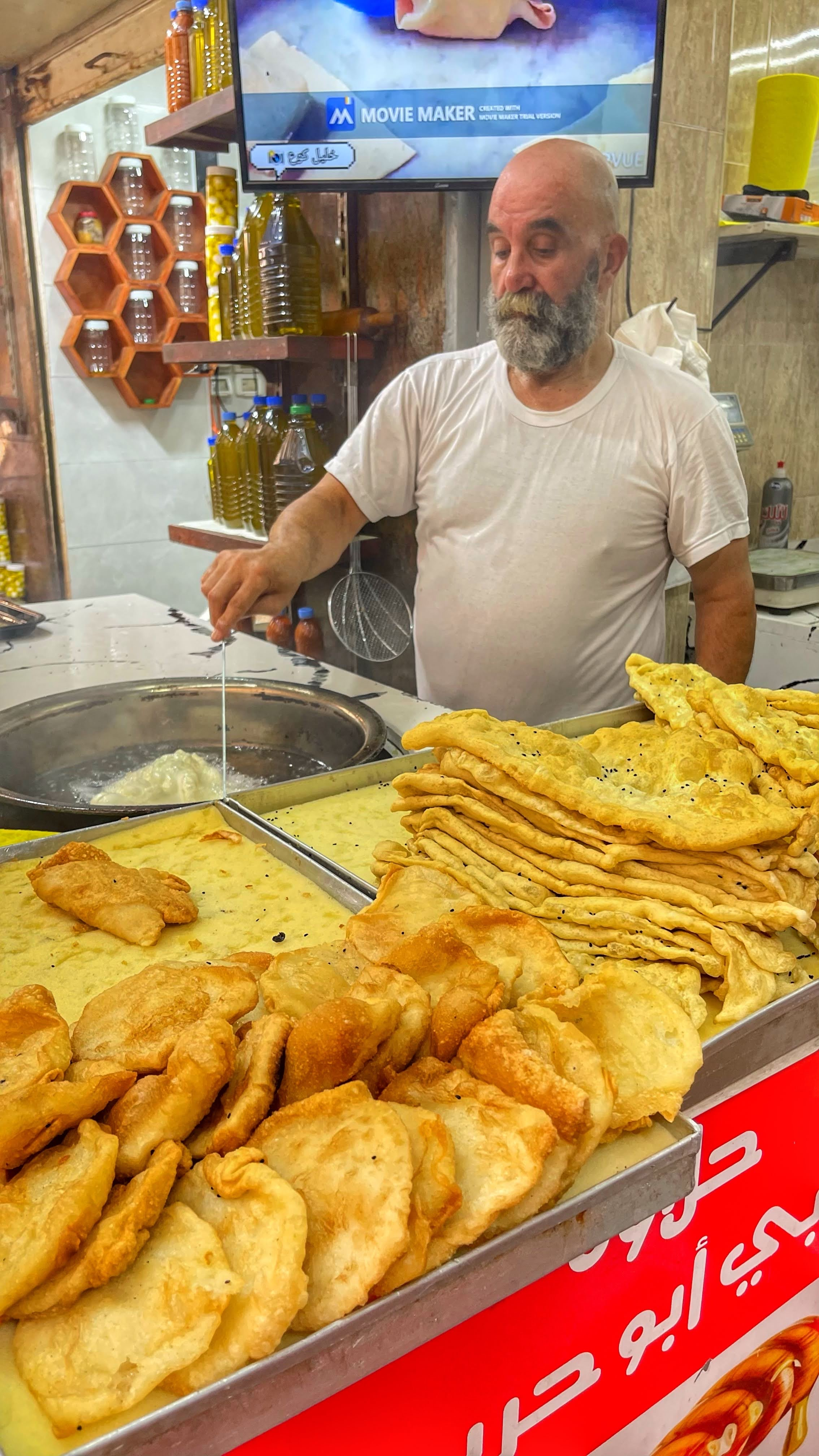
Tamriyeh in Nablus, seen in the bottom left

In Palestine, tamriyeh is primarily associated with the city of Nablus, where it was traditionally made during Ramadan or in winter or in the month of Sha'ban during family gatherings (Arabic: شعبونية). It is popular as a breakfast item. The Nabulsi variety (Arabic: تمرية نابلسية, romanized: Tamriyyah Nabulsiyyah) of tamriyeh spread to Jordan and Lebanon by immigration. As of 2022, there were at least 15 shops selling tamriyeh in Nablus, a number that has decreased over time. Tamriyeh shops are concentrated in the old City of Nablus. In Nablusi tamriyeh, the semolina pudding is typically left to cool down overnight before its used, and it served hot after its fried. The dessert is also common in Tulkarm.

== Culture ==
Tamriyeh is made by Christians to celebrate holidays and by Muslims during Ramadan.

Tamriyeh dubbed a "poor man's dessert" because of its inexpensive ingredients.

== See also ==
- List of fried dough foods
- Znoud el-sit, Arab sweet of filo pastry filled with cream and fried
- Zalabiyeh, fried Arab sweet
