= Asabe Zainab =

Arab dessert made from fried dough

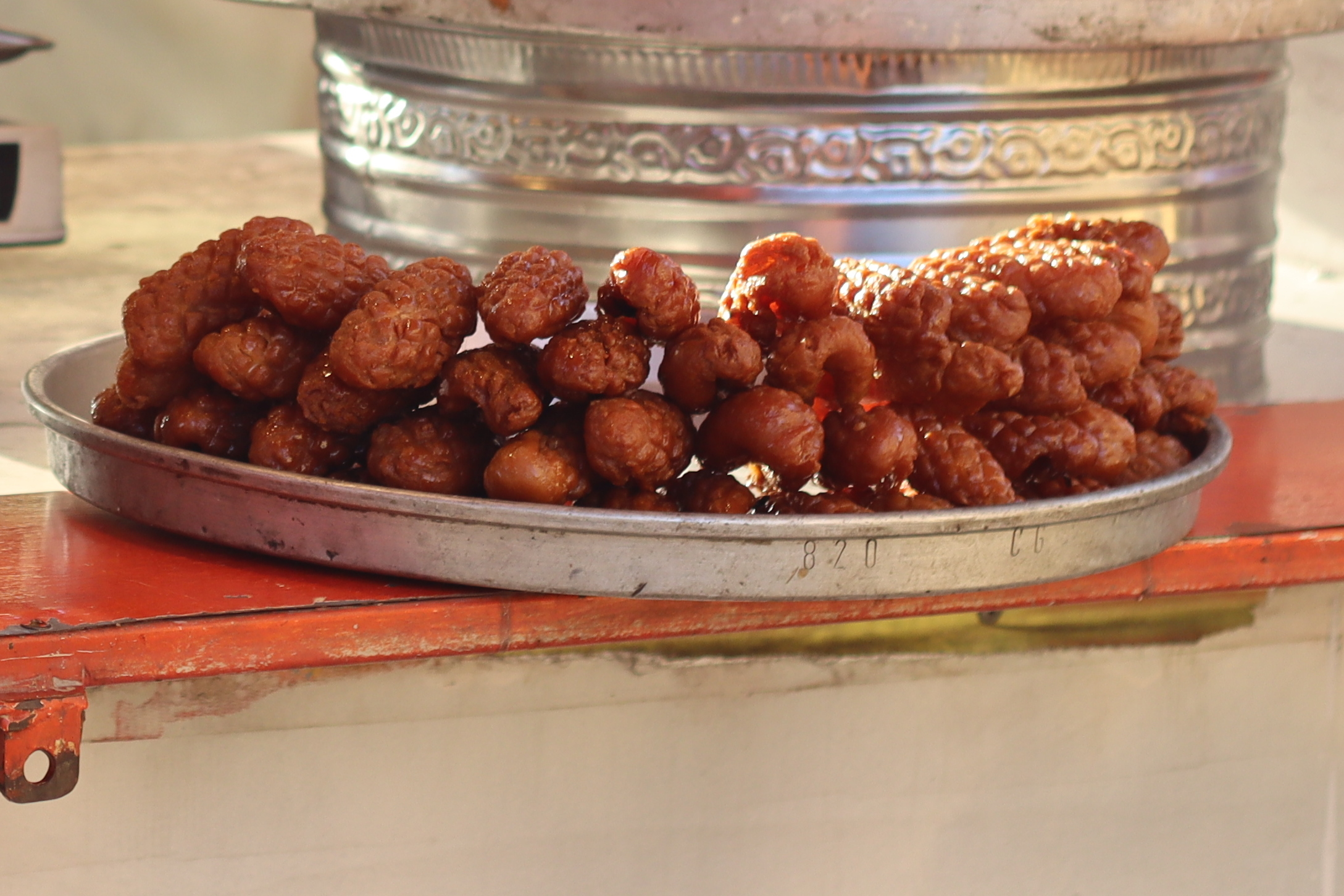
- Asabe Zainab in Syria
- Course: Dessert
- Region or state: Arab world
- Main ingredients: Fried dough, sugar

Asabe‘ Zainab (Arabic: أصابع زينب, lit. 'Zainab's fingers'), also Sawabe‘ Zeinab (Egyptian Arabic: صوابع زينب), are a cannoli-like dessert popular in the Arab world typically made from fried dough with many variations.

== History ==
A recipe for cannoli-like "stuffed tubes" or qananeet mahshuwwa (Arabic: قنانيط محشوة, lit. 'stuffed tubes') appears in a 13th-Century Andalusian cookbook, the recipe calls for frying unleavened dough then stuffing it with sugar and nuts. They appear later in a Mamluk Egyptian cookbook as "Zaynab's fingers". It is believed by some historians that these medieval recipes might have influenced modern day cannoli through their presence in Muslim Sicily.

Zaynab's fingers also make an appearance in Muhammad bin Hasan al-Baghdadi's Kitab al-Tabikh, another 13th-Century cookbook from the Abbasid Caliphate.

"Zaynab's fingers" were also mentioned as a dessert in a poem by Al-Tha'alibi in his work Thimar al-Qulub.

The 1936 volume of the journal of The Palestine Oriental Society, described a variety of Asabe Zainab:

'Asabi' zenab are small cakes made of plain dough with sesame oil, syrup, anise and hilbeh (fenugreek). The surface is rolled on the ghurbal to give it a ridged appearance.

== Names ==
The origin of the name Zainab's fingers is debated, and there are multiple competing stories with explanations for the name, some stories claim that "Zainab" refers to Zaynab bint Ali, the granddaughter of Prophet Muhammed, other stories claim that Zaynab was a famous queen, other popular stories claim that Zainab was the cook who invented the dish.

== By region ==
In Egypt, Zainab's fingers (or sawabe Zeinab, Egyptian Arabic: صوابع زينب) is an anise-flavored fried pastry that is flavored with orange flower water, the same dessert is referred to as maakaroun (Arabic: معكرون) in Lebanon.

In Omani cuisine, asabe Zainab are a fried filo pastry roll stuffed with cream cheese analogous to znoud el-sit that are popular in Iraq and the Levant. "Balah al-Sham" are sometimes referred to as "Zaynab's fingers" as well.

In Nablus, asabe Zaynab resemble lokma but are made with semolina flour and are shaped into fingers rather than balls.

== In culture ==
"Cannoli-like" asabi Zaynab were mentioned in the story "The Porter and the Three Ladies of Baghdad" in Arabian Nights.

== See also ==
- Fatima's fingers, savory Tunisian fried roll with thin dough with similar name
- Brik
- Tulumba
- Lokma
