= Kaymak =

Creamy dairy food similar to clotted cream

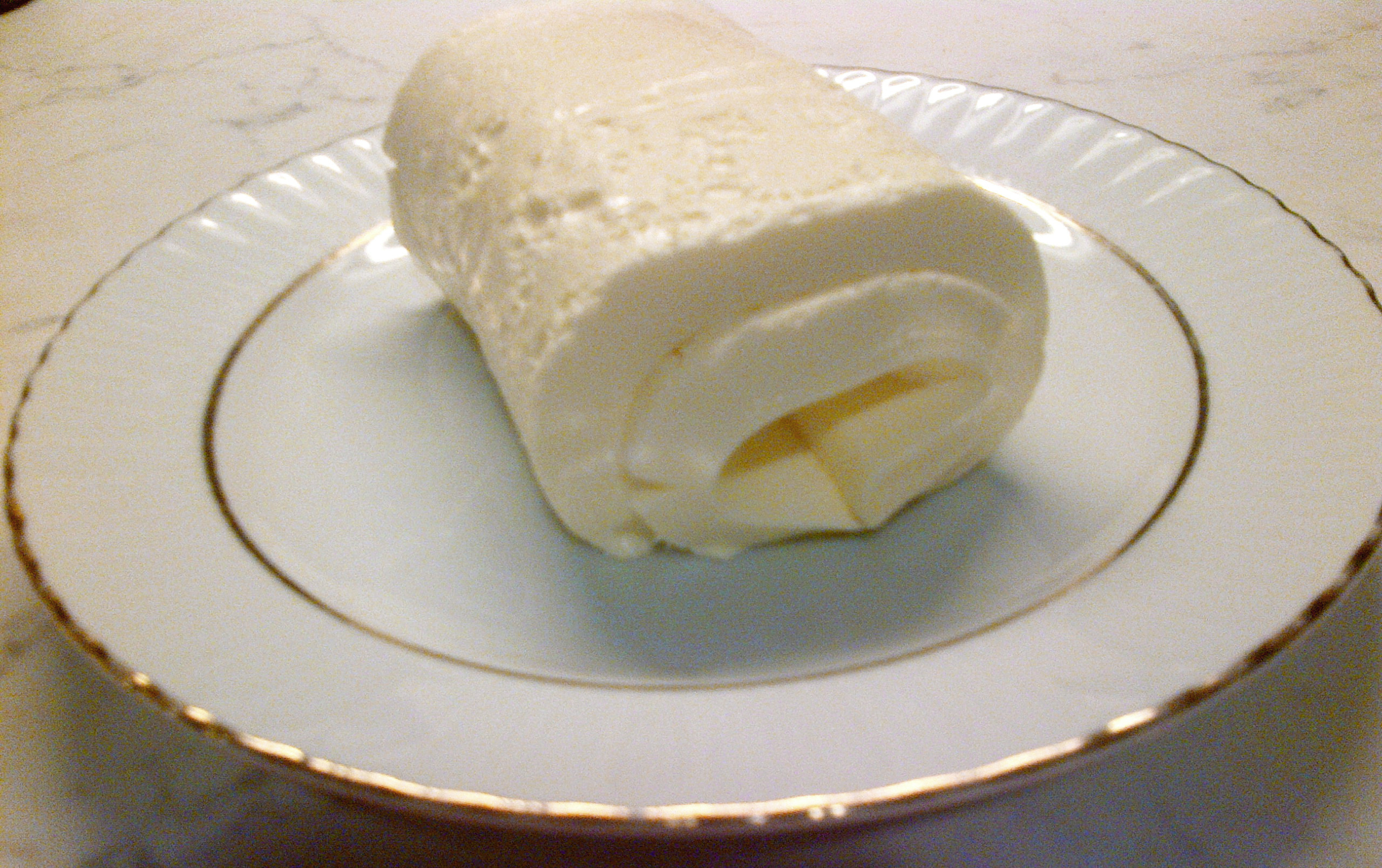
- Kaymak from Turkey
- Alternative names: Qishta, sarshir, ser, ajkë
- Course: Breakfast and dessert
- Place of origin: Central Asia
- Region or state: Armenia, Iraq, Syria, Iran, India, Mongolia, Georgia, Albania, Greece, Lebanon, North Macedonia, Serbia, Romania, Turkey, Bulgaria, Egypt, Montenegro, Bosnia and Herzegovina, Afghanistan, Azerbaijan, Kyrgyzstan, Uzbekistan, Kazakhstan, Pakistan, India, Croatia, Tajikistan
- Main ingredients: Milk
- Similar dishes: Malai, clotted cream

Kaymak (Turkish: [kaj.mak]), also known as qishta (Arabic: قشدة) or sarshir (Persian: سَرشیر), is a creamy dairy food similar to clotted cream, made from the milk of water buffalo, cows, sheep, or goats in Central Asia, most Turkic regions on the Eurasian Steppe, the Caucasus, Turkey, most Balkan countries, the Levant, Iran and Iraq.

The traditional method of making kaymak is to boil the raw milk slowly, then simmer it for two hours over a very low heat. After the heat source is shut off, the cream is skimmed and left to chill (and mildly ferment) for several hours or days. Kaymak has a high percentage of milk fat, typically about 60%. It has a thick, creamy consistency (not entirely compact, because of milk protein fibers) and a rich taste.

In the Balkans, kaymak is sometimes salted and left to ripen up to a year, becoming стари кајмак stari kajmak 'old kajmak', скоруп skorup, or зрели кајмак zreli kajmak 'ripened/mature kajmak', with a taste and texture between butter and cream cheese.

== Etymology ==
The word kaymak is of Turkish origin and means "cream". It derives from Old Turkic kanak 'the skin on milk, clotted milk'. The earliest known attestation is in an 11th-century Turkic dictionary.

Related forms occur widely among Turkic languages: qaymaq in Azerbaijani, қаймақ in Kazakh (qaymaq), каймак (kaymak) in Kyrgyz, каймак (qaymaq) in Tatar, gaýmak in Turkmen, قايماق (qaymaq) in Uyghur, and qaymoq in Uzbek. The word has entered neighboring languages: καϊμάκι (kaïmáki) in Greek, კაიმაღი (kaimaghi) in Georgian, قيمق (qaymaq) or قيمر (geymar) in Gulf and Iraqi Arabic, qeymax in Kurdish (Kurmanji), فايق (ḳáymaḳ) in Persian, кајмак (kajmak) in Macedonian, kajmak in Albanian, кајмак (kajmak) in Serbo-Croatian, каймак (kajmak) in Bulgarian, caimac in Romanian, and kajmak in Hungarian.

In Iran, kaymak is also known as سَرشیر (sarshir), which translates to "top of the milk", and likewise as սեր (ser) in Armenia. In the Levant and Egypt, the dish is called قشدة (qishta) (or its regional variations ashta and eshta). In Albanian: ajkë, it is also called ajkë.

== History ==
Early Chinese historical sources during the first century BCE record the preparation of a skimmed cream called sū (酥) made from cow and sheep milk, noting that it was adopted from Central Asian pastoralists that lived along the northern and northwestern frontiers of modern-day China. During the Qing dynasty, Chinese imperial texts reveal the preparation of sū: repeatedly boiling milk, stirring it, allowing it to cool, and lifting the dense skin off the top to make sū.

Preserved clotted cream has been recovered from Mongol-period burials dating to around the 13th century. In modern Mongolian cuisine, there is a clotted cream product called öröm.

== By region ==
=== Afghanistan ===
In Afghanistan, qaimak or qaymaq is thinner and is eaten for breakfast meals usually with bread. People typically top qaimak with honey, sugar, or mix it with jam. It can be spread on pastries or added to milk tea. Qaimak can be purchased at grocery stores in Afghanistan or made at home. Afghan qaimak can be made from cow or buffalo milk.

=== Balkans ===
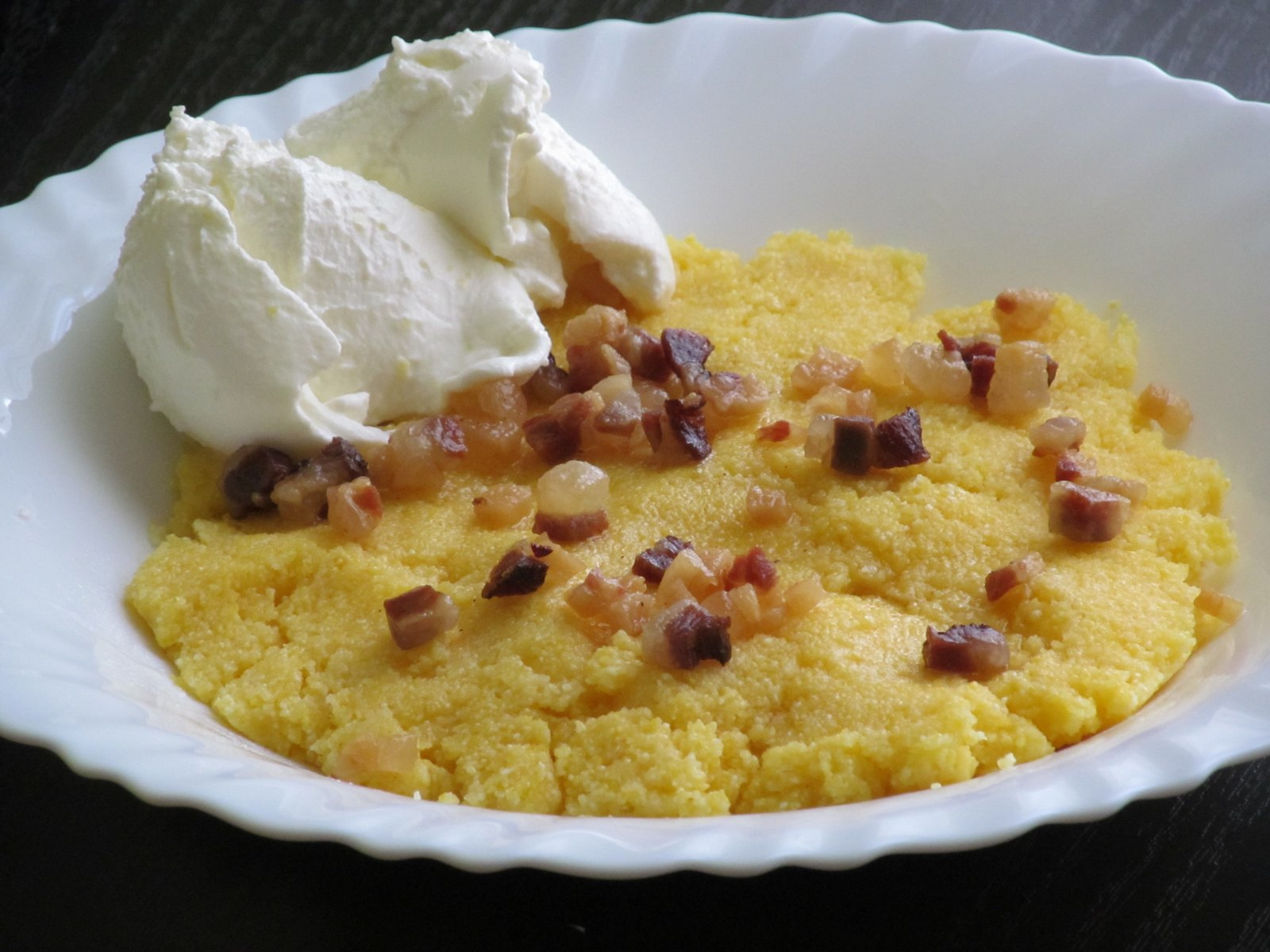
Palenta, cornmeal mush with kajmak and bacon

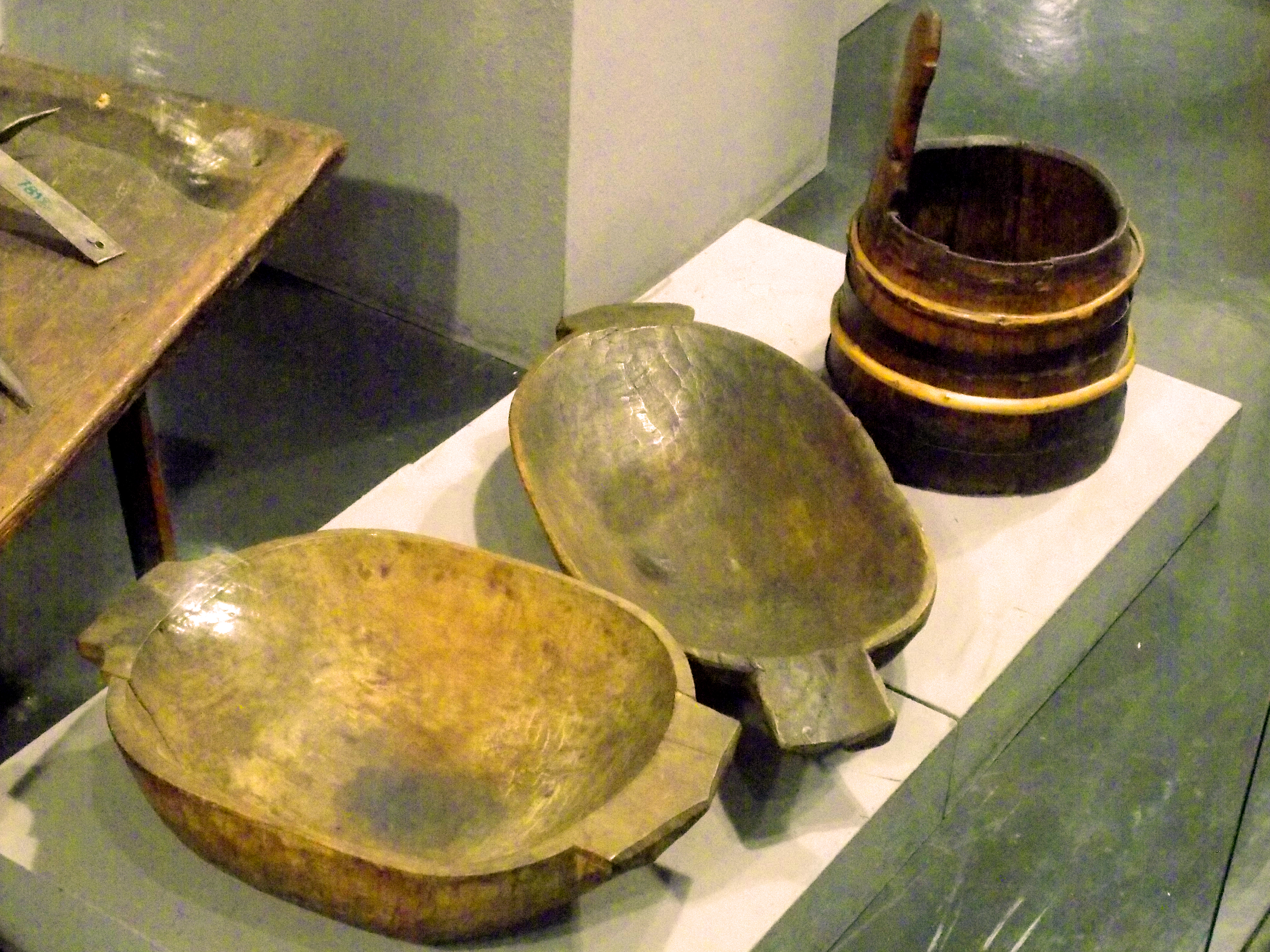
Traditional wooden bowls for making and storing kaymak (Ethnographic Museum, Belgrade)

Known as kajmak, it is almost always made at home, though commercial production has increased. Kajmak is most expensive when at its freshest—only a day or two old. It can keep for weeks in the refrigerator but becomes harder and loses quality. Kajmak can also be matured in dried animal-skin sacks; one variation is called skorup. The term kajmak is also used for the creamy foam in Turkish coffee, and many other coffees in the Balkans.

Kajmak is usually enjoyed as an appetizer or for Saturday morning breakfast (as Saturdays are market days when the best kajmak can be bought), and also as a condiment. The simplest recipe is lepinja s kajmakom (white bread shaped in a circle and shorter than regular bread filled with kajmak), consumed for breakfast or as fast food.

Bulgarians, Bosnians, Montenegrins, Serbs, and Albanians consider it a national meal.

In Serbia, it is stuffed inside a chicken or other meat cutlet, breaded, and fried into a dish called Karađorđeva šnicla, similar to a stuffed schnitzel.

Other (Serbian) traditional dishes with kajmak (sold in restaurants) include pljeskavica s kajmakom (the Balkan hamburger patty topped with melted kajmak), as well as ribić u kajmaku (beef shank simmered with kajmak).

=== Armenia ===
In Armenia, kaymak is mostly called sar (սար) or seruts’k (սերուցք). It is mostly popular in Western Armenia communities, but not a really commercialized product and mostly a product found in villages. It is a creamy dairy product made by simmering fresh buffalo, sheep, or cow milk, then cooling it slowly, during which a thick layer of cream forms on top. This cream is then skimmed off and sometimes lightly fermented. It is often served with honey, bread, or fruit, especially at breakfast or during special occasions. It is also used for desserts, like with gata, kadaif, or baklava, but some eat it fresh. It can also be used as a filling for pancakes.

=== Georgia ===
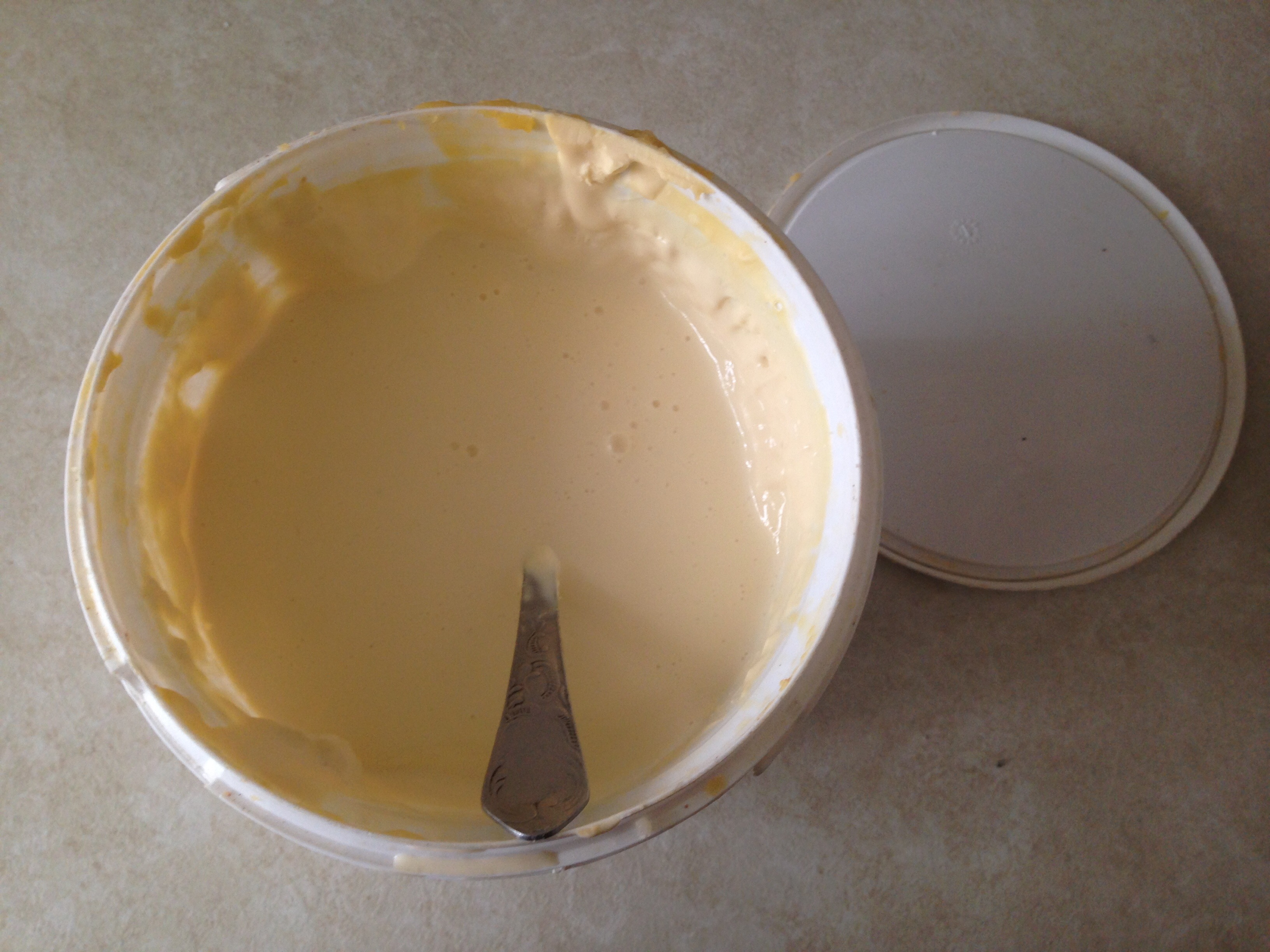
A bucket containing kaimaghi in a home in Keda, Georgia

In the Adjara region of Georgia, bordering Turkey, კაიმაღი (kaimaghi) is made from cow's milk in homes in the mountainous municipalities of Keda, Shuakhevi, and Khulo. It is typically eaten with Georgian cheese and/or bread, and is only rarely served in restaurants.

=== Greece ===
Kaïmaki (καϊμάκι) is a soft cream cheese that can be spread on bread or used in cooking as a filling in food and for desserts.

The word kaïmaki is also used for a chewy ice cream flavoured with mastic.

=== Iraq ===
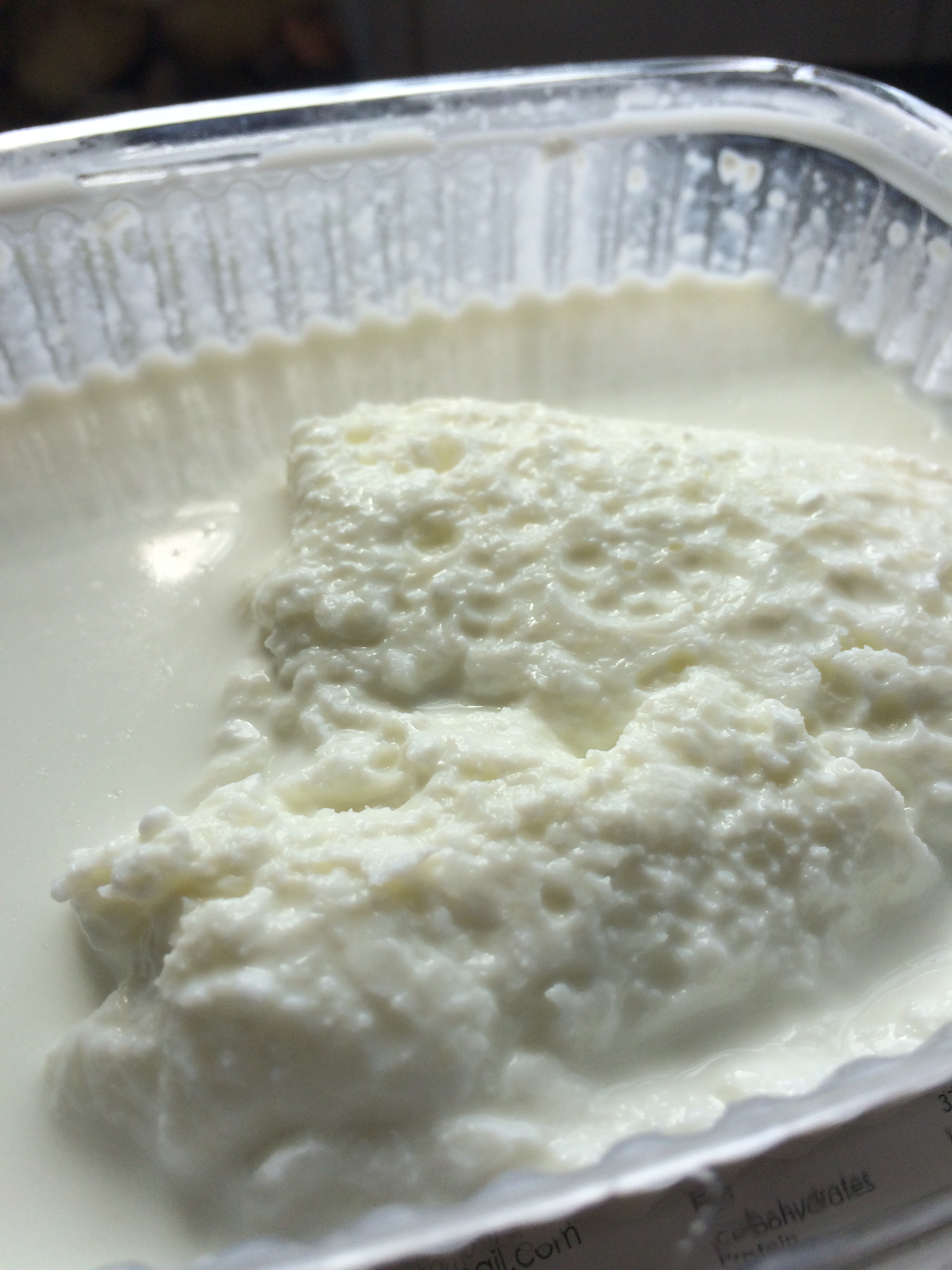
Iraqi geymar (qeimar)

In Iraq, it is called geymar or qeimar (قيمر) and is very popular. Iraqi geymar is usually made from the rich fatty milk of cows or buffaloes, which are prevalent in the marshes of southern Iraq. It is available both factory-produced and from local vendors or farmers as geymar Arab.

Iraqis tend to serve geymar for breakfast with bread, honey or jam. The most popular way is to spread it on an Iraqi pastry bread called kahi and cover it with date honey. Qeymar on kahi with date syrup or honey is a long-standing traditional breakfast in Baghdad and throughout southern and northern Iraq.

=== Iran ===
In Iran, sarsheer (سرشیر) or geymar is a common breakfast food. The word sarsheer can also mean cream separated without heating.

=== Turkey ===
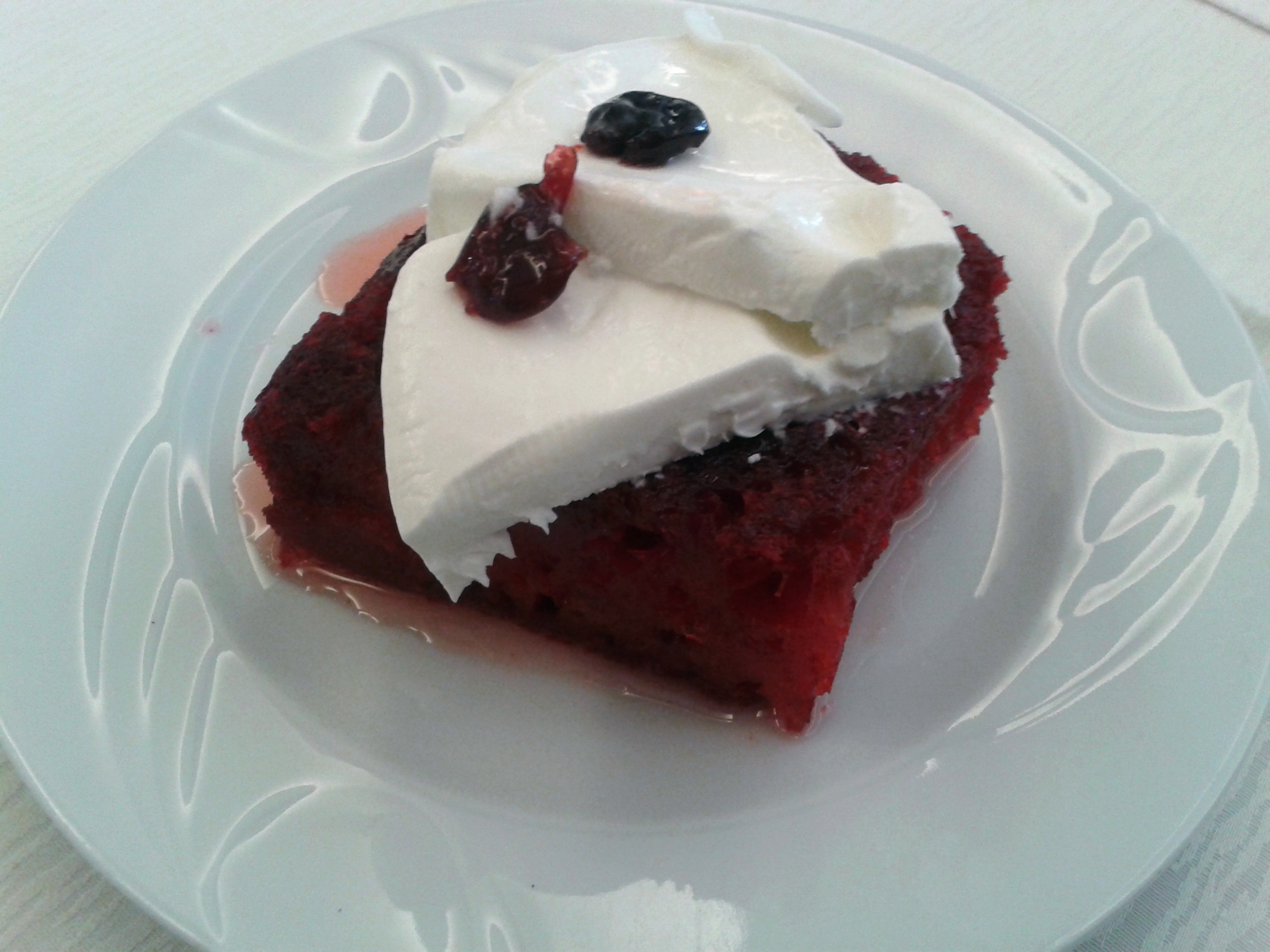
Turkish ekmek kadayıfı topped with kaymak

Shops in Turkey have been devoted to kaymak production and consumption for centuries. Kaymak is mainly consumed today as part of a Turkish breakfast. One type is found in the Afyonkarahisar region where the water buffalo are fed from the residue of poppy seeds pressed for oil. Kaymak is often eaten with baklava and other Turkish desserts, fruit preserve and honey (bal kaymak) or as a filling in pancakes.

== See also ==
- Cream cheese
- Creole cream cheese
- Malai
- Qishta
- Mascarpone
