= Turkish breakfast =

Breakfast served in Turkey

- Traditional breakfast from Çeşme, İzmir
- Alternative names: Kahvaltı
- Type: Breakfast
- Place of origin: Turkey
- Associated cuisine: Turkish cuisine
- Main ingredients: Eggs (e.g. menemen), cheese, olives, fresh vegetables, bread (e.g. simit), pastries (e.g. börek), spreads (e.g. kaymak), black tea.

Turkish breakfast (Turkish: kahvaltı, lit. 'before coffee') refers to the traditional breakfast of Turkey, characterized by a wide variety of small dishes served together, typically blending a multitude of flavors, textures, and food categories. The table is adorned with both sweet and savory items, spanning cheeses, olives, vegetables, local breads, eggs, börek, baklava or other sweet pastries, and more, accompanied by hot beverages such as Turkish tea (çay).

A prominent feature of Turkish culinary culture, kahvaltı is considered one of the most elaborate and social breakfast traditions in the world, celebrated for its diversity, abundance, and the act of bringing individuals together, often extending for several hours during weekends and holidays. In the 21st century, Turkish breakfast has also gained widespread global popularity through tourism in Turkey, social media, Turkish diaspora, and international restaurants.

== Etymology ==
The word kahvaltı is derived from two words: kahve ("coffee") and altı ("under" or "before"), which translates to "before coffee." It is a meal that traditionally happens before coffee is consumed, as in the Ottoman times, coffee was considered a beverage to be enjoyed after meals rather than during or before them.

== History ==
Breakfast culture during the Ottoman Empire began sometime in the 18th century, but became widespread in the late 19th century. The term kahvaltı originated from tahte'l-kahve ("under coffee"), initially functioning as a medicinal snack to coat the stomach before consuming coffee. Nevertheless, the Ottomans used to consume two meals on a daily basis: a mid-morning meal and an early evening meal.

By the late Ottoman period, urban breakfast culture expanded, incorporating jams, butters, cured meats, and pastries. During the Republican era (20th century), cafés, çay bahçeleri (tea gardens), and later breakfast-focused restaurants standardized and popularized the modern, multi-dish format.

Since the 2000s, Turkish breakfast has become a significant cultural and tourism attraction. Regions such as Van, the Black Sea, and the Aegean have developed localized breakfast specialties, contributing to its national and international identity.
