= Güllaç =

Ottoman palace dessert

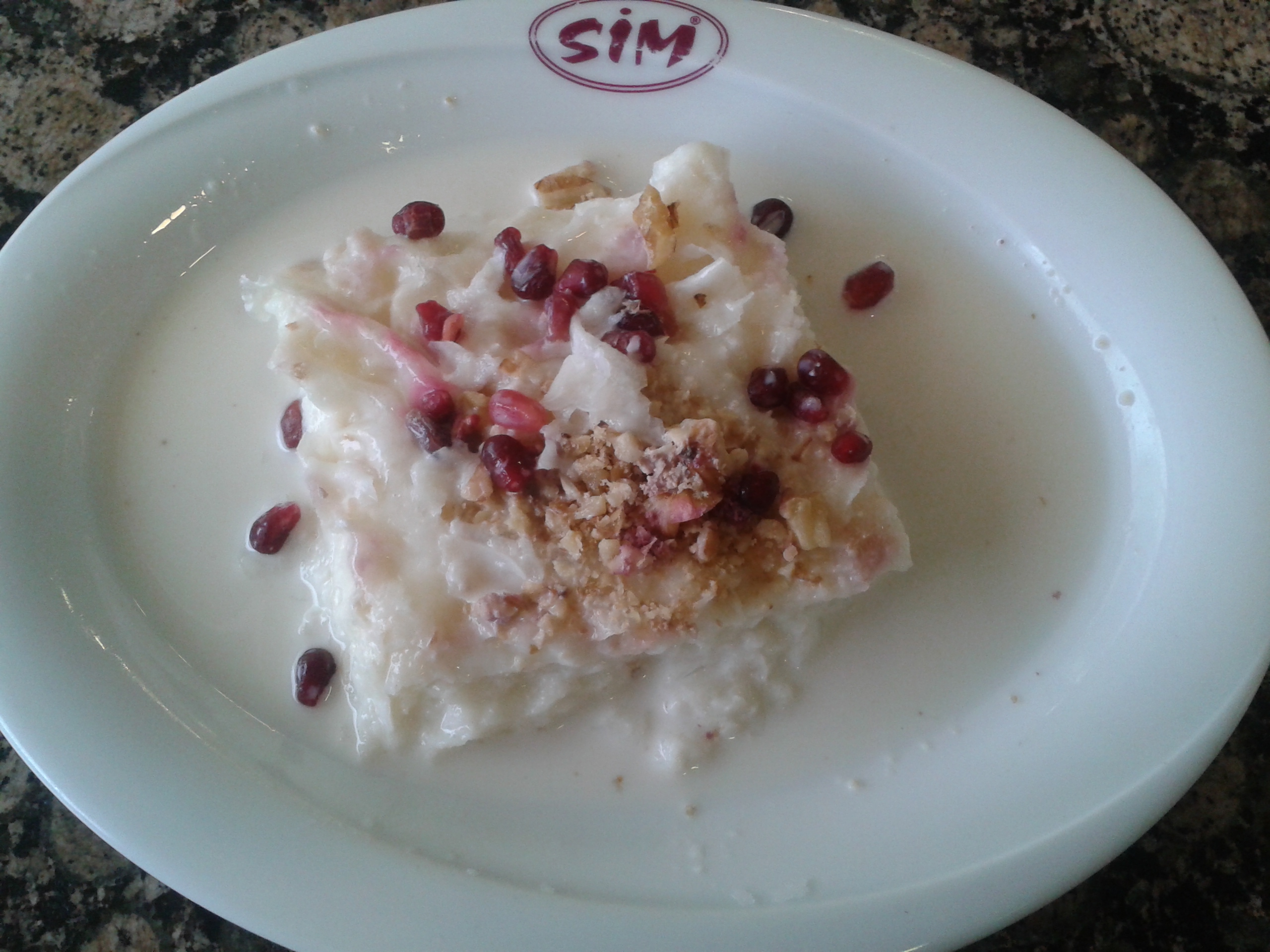
- Course: Dessert
- Place of origin: Turkey
- Main ingredients: corn starch, wheat flour, walnuts, milk, pomegranate

Güllaç (pronounced [ɟylˈlatʃ]) is a Turkish dessert made with milk, rose water, pomegranate and a special kind of pastry. It is consumed especially during Ramadan.

Güllaç dough is prepared with corn starch and wheat flour, although originally it was made only with wheat starch. Güllaç contains walnuts between the layers that are put in milk.

== History ==
Its first known mention is in a 14th-century book, Yinshan Zhenyao (飮膳正要), a food and health manual written by Hu Sihui (忽思慧), a physician to the Mongol court of the Yuan dynasty. The book documents primarily Mongol and Turkic dishes that exhibit a limited amount of Chinese influence.

Recipes for güllaç wafers made by cooking batter made from egg whites and starch on a hot pan appeared in Ottoman Turkish cookbooks, such as Kitâb-ı Me’kûlât. An Ottoman Turkish to English dictionary published in 1890 by British lexicographer James Redhouse described gulaj (كلاج) as "A sweet dish made with thin starch wafers, filled with clotted cream flavored with rosewater."

Güllaç was used for making Güllaç Lokması and Güllaç Baklavası, old Turkish desserts made during the Ottoman period in Turkey.

As of 2019, güllaç wafer production remains present in Turkey; one manufacturer was reported to sell 230 tons during Ramadan, which made up ~65% of the market in Turkey then.

== Etymology ==
Turkish "güllaç" is loaned from the Persian word گلانج (golanc). The earliest record of the word in a Turkic language dates back to 1477. It is first attested in the Persian-Turkish dictionary Lügat-i Halîmî.

Güllaç refers to both the thin pastry used to make the dessert as well as the dessert itself.

In Egypt, gollash pies are named after güllaç pastry, although the Egyptian version is baked, savoury and contains meat.

== Güllaç wafers ==
Güllaç wafers, which are also referred as simply güllaç, are the pastry used to make güllaç, they are made by pouring batter onto a hot saj, the wafers are very thin and dry, and are traditionally only made during Ramadan.

The batter is typically made from starch, flour, and milk. They are circular in shape.

=== Use ===
In Lebanon, güllaç wafers are folded to envelope a cream filling and then deep fried, vendors initially imported the wafers from Syria and Turkey, but eventually began domestic production of alternatives.

In Palestinian cuisine, güllaç (Arabic: قلاج, كلاج) is cooked on a saj, but is filled with nuts or cheese.

In Tartus, Syria, the wafers are made similarly to brik sheets by cooking a semolina-based batter on a hot pan, the wafers are filled with nuts or qishta and are then baked in samneh.
