= Znoud el-sit =

Fried Arab dessert

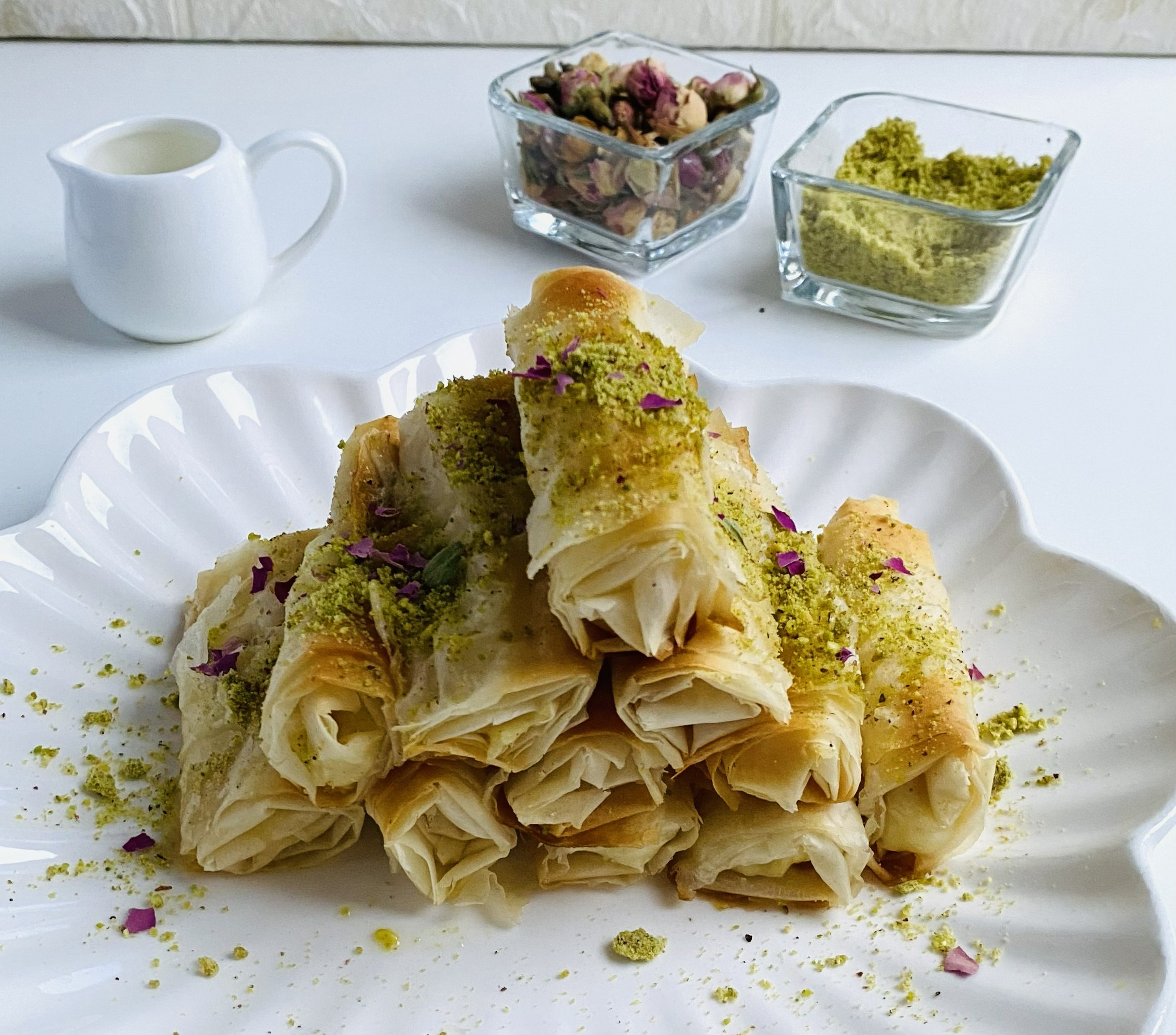
- Znoud el-sit, decorated with pistachios and dried rose petals
- Alternative names: Asabe Zainab
- Course: Dessert
- Main ingredients: Filo, cream

Znoud el-sit (Arabic: زنود الست, lit. 'Lady's forearms') is an Arab dessert, made from stuffed filo pastry that is shaped into a "finger", fried, and topped with syrup and crushed nuts. Qishta, cream cheese, and muhallebi are common stuffings. It is often likened to a cannoli. It is found in Levantine, Iraqi, and Omani cuisines.

== Preparation ==
The dessert is prepared by rolling the filling into baklava (filo) pastry sheets, shaping it into a rectangle or tube, it is then fried, and then soaked in a syrup called qatir, and finally garnished with pistachios and dried rose petals. The syrup is traditionally flavored with orange blossom water.

== Etymology ==
The origin of the name znoud el-sit is uncertain, with folk tales claiming it originated from Ottoman Syria, it is commonly believed that the name is derived from its shape. The name asabe Zainab (Arabic: أصابع زينب, lit. 'Zainab's fingers') is sometimes used instead, but it may also refer to a separate dessert similar to lokma. Both names follow a pattern in Arab cuisine where desserts are given feminine names, other such desserts include swar el-sit ("Lady's bracelet") and ghazl al-banat ("The girls' spinning"), a tahini-based candy floss. The name znoud el sit is attested in English texts as early 1965.

== History ==
A common folk legend credits the name of the dessert to Ottoman statesman Mustafa Agha Barbar, then governor of Tripoli, Lebanon, while assigning its origin to Kirkuk, Iraq.

== By region ==
In Lebanon, and the greater Levant, as well as Iraq, znoud el-sit are a common dessert. They are typically made with layers of rolled phyllo sheets, stuffed with qishta, which are then fried and coated in syrup. They are traditionally served for Iftar during the month of Ramadan.

Znoud es-sit was traditionally fried in samneh.

Znoud el-sit were popularized in Egypt by refugees of the Syrian civil war.

In Omani cuisine, they are known as asabe Zainab and are filled with cheese instead of qishta.

== Customs ==
Znoud el-sit are often served with coffee. They are also common during holidays or celebrations.

== In pop culture ==
A comedy show named znoud el-sit after the sweet aired in 2013, every episode of the show showcased a different dish from Damascene cuisine.

== See also ==
- List of fried dough foods
- List of doughnut varieties
- List of desserts
- Arab cuisine
- Tamriyeh, Levantine sweet of fried cream-filled filo pastry
