= Cannoli =

Italian ricotta-filled pastry

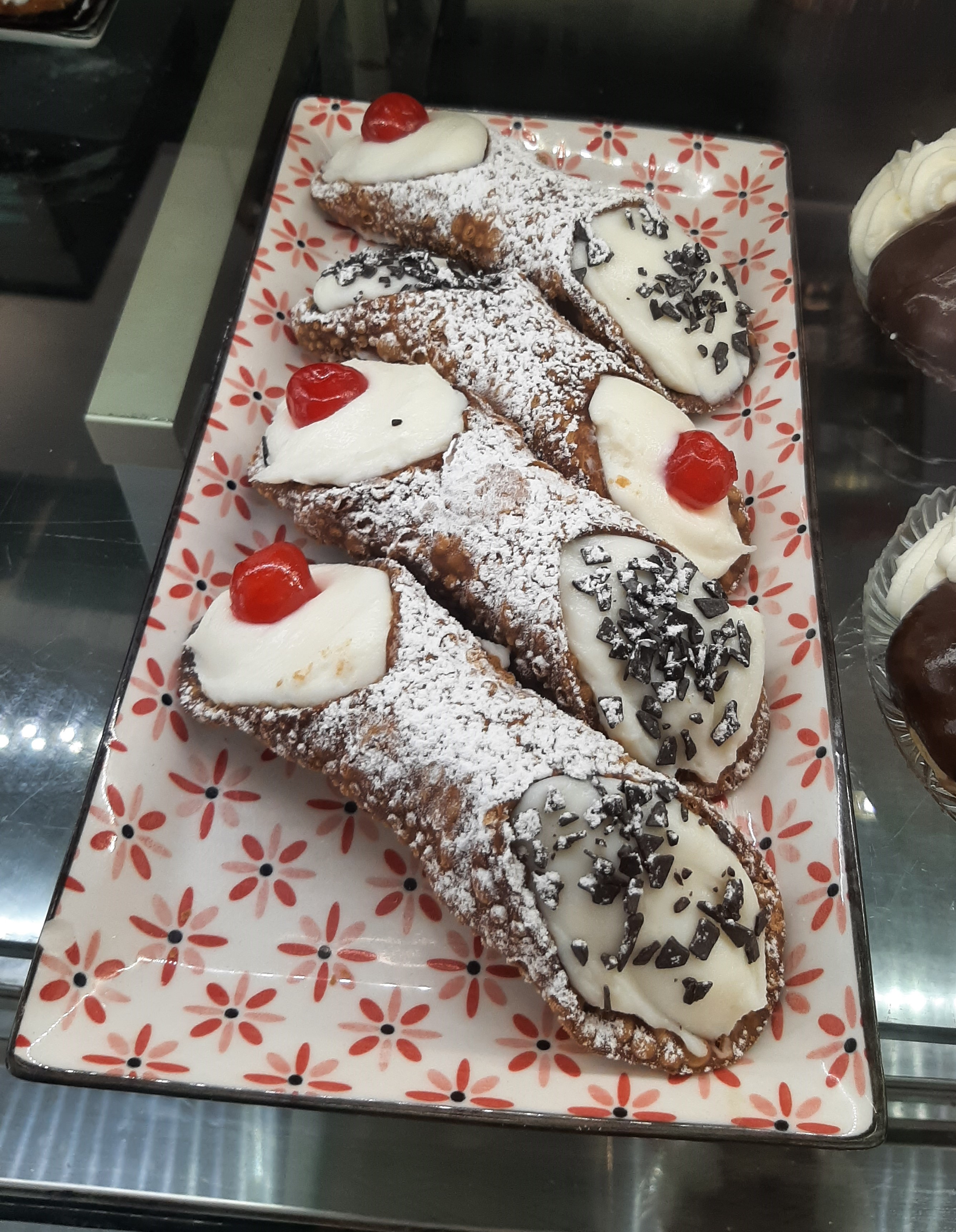
- Cannoli topped with candied fruit and chocolate chips sprinkled with confectioners' sugar
- Alternative names: Cannolo (Italian singular form), cannolo siciliano (Italian singular form)
- Type: Pastry
- Place of origin: Italy
- Region or state: Sicily
- Main ingredients: Fried pastry dough, ricotta filling
- Variations: Kannoli (Malta), kanojët (Albania)

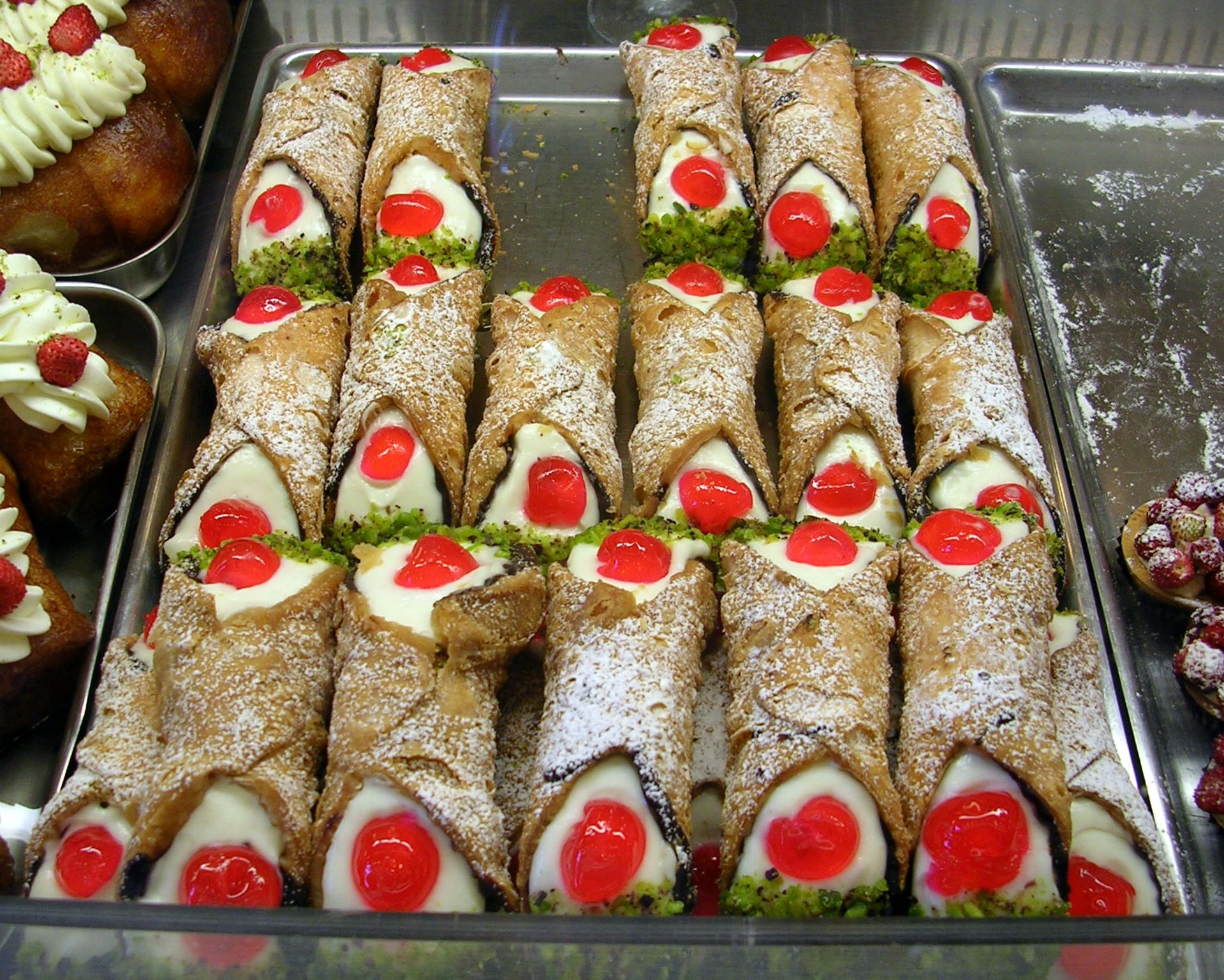
Cannoli with chopped pistachios and candied cherries

Cannoli (Note: English: /kəˈnoʊli/ kə-NOH-lee; Italian: cannolo [kanˈnɔːlo], pl.: cannoli [kanˈnɔːli]; Sicilian: cannolu [kanˈnɔːlʊ], pl.: cannola [kanˈnɔːla].) are Sicilian pastries consisting of a tube-shaped shell of pastry dough, filled with a sweet and creamy filling containing ricotta cheese. Their size ranges from 9 to 20 centimetres (3 1/2 to 8 in). In mainland Italy, the food is commonly known as cannolo siciliano (lit. 'Sicilian cannoli').

In culinary traditions across Sicily, regional variations in cannoli fillings reflect local preferences and ingredient availability. In Palermo, cannoli are decorated with candied orange zest, adding a citrusy sweetness to the ricotta filling. In Catania, chopped pistachios are favored, adding a distinctive nutty flavor and texture. Ramacca is known for its purple artichokes, which also feature as filling in some cannoli recipes.

== Etymology ==
Italian cannolo and Sicilian cannolu is originally a diminutive noun meaning 'little tube', from canna, 'cane' or 'tube'.

== History ==
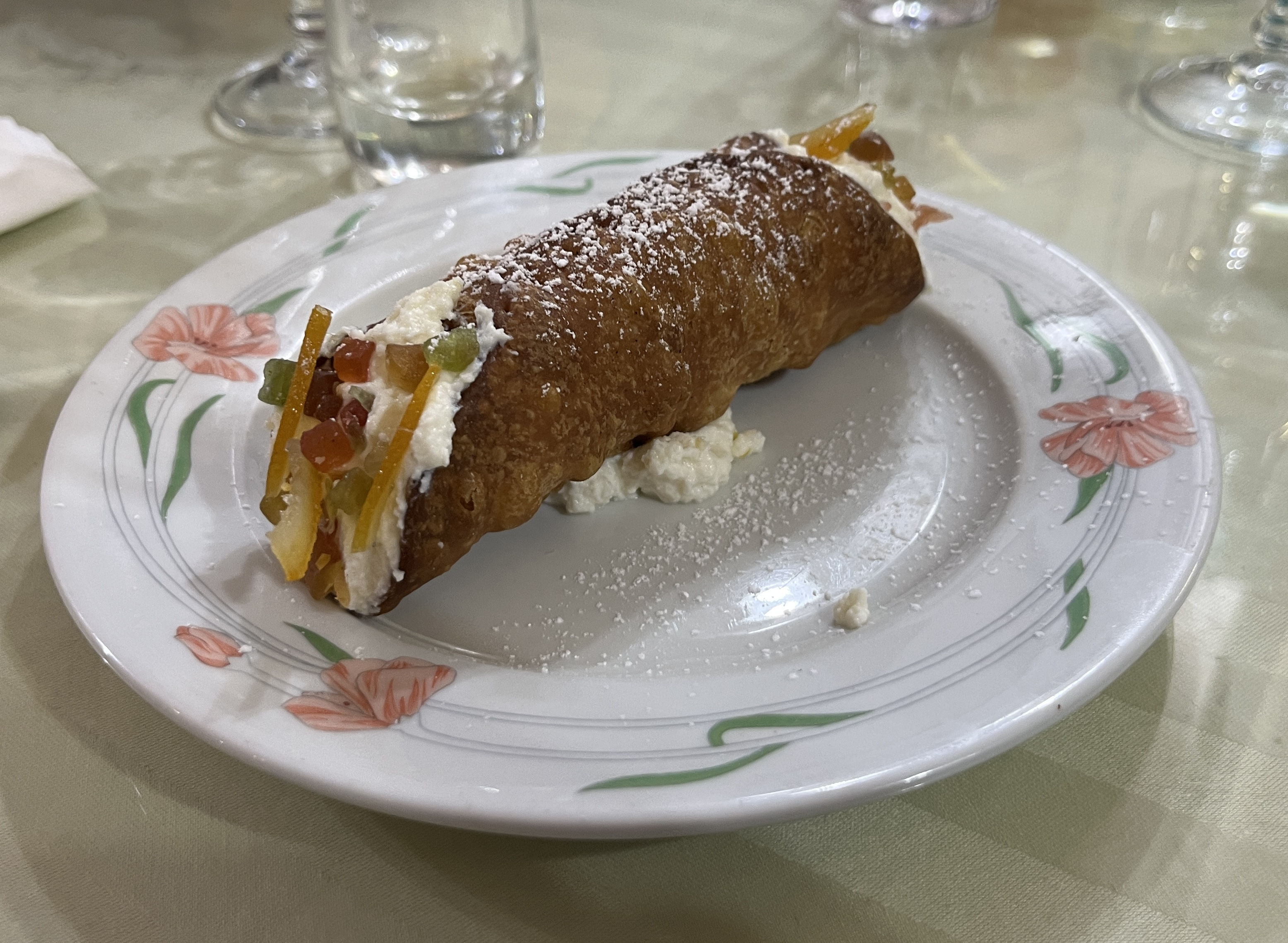
Cannoli

Some food historians place the origins of cannoli in 827–1091 in Caltanissetta, Sicily, by the concubines of princes looking to capture their attention. This period marks the Arab rule of the island, known then as the Emirate of Sicily, giving rise to the theory that the etymology stemmed from the Arabic word qanawāt, 'tubes', in reference to their tube-shaped shells. During this time, the Arabs influenced Sicilian baking with the introduction of candied fruits, pistachios, and cinnamon. They also introduced the technique of combining nuts and fruits with sugar and honey.

Gaetano Basile claims that cannoli come from the Palermo and Messina areas and were historically prepared as a treat during Carnival season. The dessert eventually became a year-round staple in Sicily.

Salvatore Farina argues, that, "cannolo is a word of Latin origin – canneolus – and means the joint of a reed or cane, the artisan instrument used to roll the dough that was fried to make the characteristic shell, later filled with ricotta cream." Farina continues, "Probably, long ago, in the wild days of the Saturnali and the old style Carnival, street sellers prepared cannoli in the noisy and crowded public squares, filling the shell with a ricotta and honey cream. This is a confection that comes in natural portions, ideal for eating outside just as one does today with an ice cream cone."

Some similar desserts in Middle Eastern tradition include "Zaynab's fingers" (أصابع زينب), which are filled with nuts, and qanawāt (قنوات), deep-fried dough tubes filled with various sweets, which were a popular pastry.

== See also ==
Media related to Cannoli at Wikimedia Commons Cannoli at the Wikibooks Cookbook subproject

- List of Italian desserts and pastries
