= Gollash =

Egyptian meat pie made from phyllo dough

Gollash جلاش
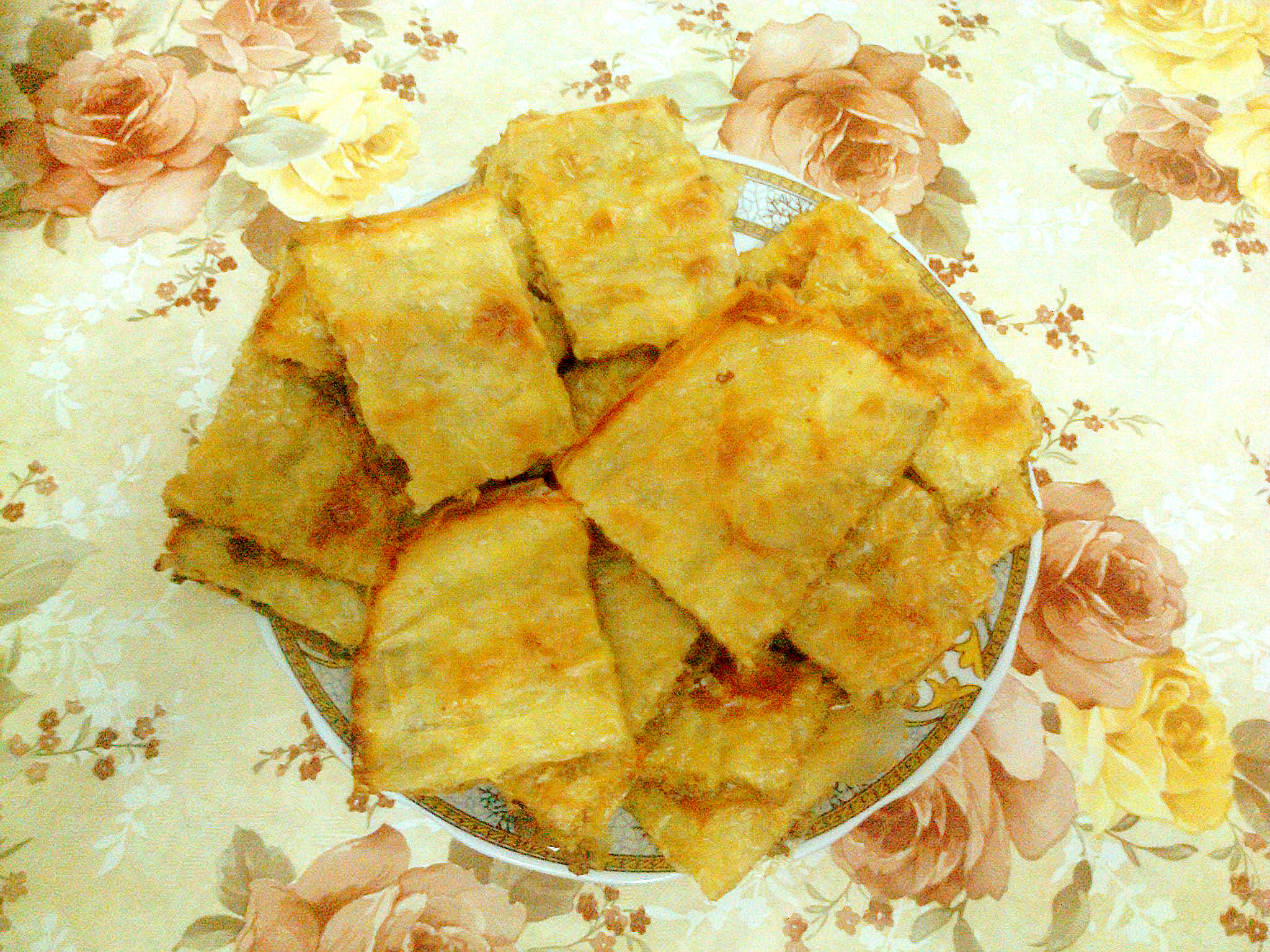
- Type: Savoury pie
- Place of origin: Egypt
- Main ingredients: Phyllo dough, minced beef, lamb
- Similar dishes: Börek

Gollash (Egyptian Arabic: جلاش) is an Egyptian dish consisting of layers of flaky phyllo dough filled with a savory spiced meat mixture, typically ground beef or lamb, and baked until golden brown. This meat pie is a staple in Egyptian cuisine and is often served during gatherings and special occasions.

== Etymology ==
The word gullāš refers to thin phyllo pastry used to prepare the dish. It is related to the Ottoman güllaç.

== Preparation ==
The preparation of gollash begins with creating a flavorful filling by sautéing finely chopped onions until translucent, then adding ground meat seasoned with warm spices such as allspice and cinnamon. Once the meat is browned and cooked through, it is set aside to cool slightly.

To assemble the pie, layers of phyllo dough are brushed with melted butter or ghee and placed into a baking dish. After layering several sheets, the meat filling is spread evenly over the dough. Additional phyllo sheets are layered on top, each brushed with butter or ghee. The assembled pie is then cut into squares or diamonds before baking.

A mixture of milk and beaten eggs, seasoned with salt and pepper, is poured over the cut pie to provide moisture and richness. The pie is then baked in a preheated oven until the phyllo turns crispy and golden brown.

== See also ==
- Egyptian cuisine
- List of Middle Eastern dishes
- List of African dishes
