= Layali lubnan =

Lebanese dessert

Layali Lubnan
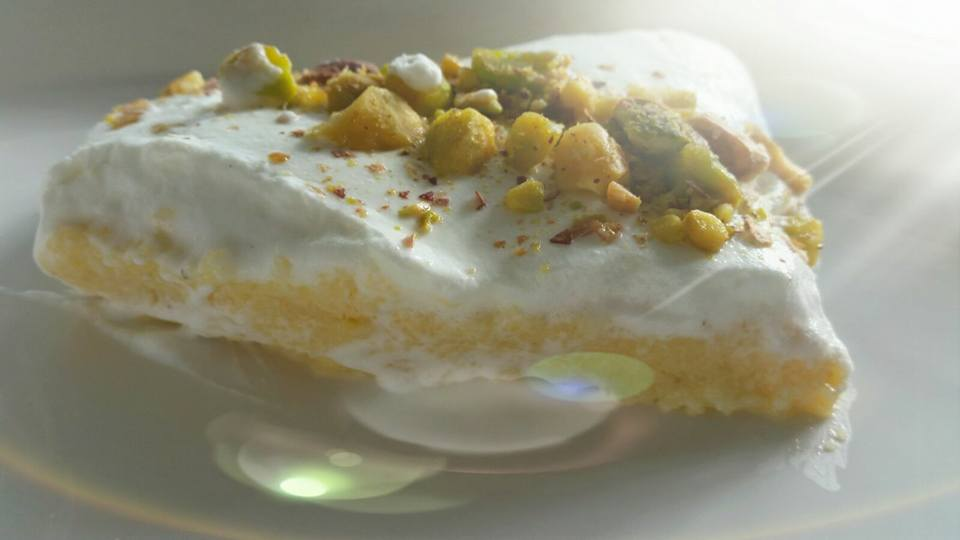
- Piece of 2-layer Layali Lubnan
- Alternative names: Beirut nights
- Course: Dessert
- Place of origin: Lebanon
- Region or state: Levant
- Associated cuisine: Lebanese cuisine
- Serving temperature: Cold
- Main ingredients: Semolina, milk, sugar, rose water, orange blossom water, cream
- Variations: Garnished with nuts, banana slices, or whipped cream

Layali Lubnan (Arabic: ليالي لبنان, lit. 'Nights of Lebanon'), also called Qashtalia (Arabic: قشطلية), is a Lebanese dessert. It is made from a layer of semolina pudding that is scented with orange blossom water and rose water, a second layer on top made from qishta, and topped with ground pistachios, honey or qatir.

== Name ==
The origin of the name "Lebanese nights" is unknown.

Different names for the dish are used, such as Beirut nights. Different spellings and pronunciations are also common, like Layali Libnan, Ashtalieh, or Qashtaliyeh (Arabic: قشطلية).

In Syrian Arabic, qashtaliya refers to a dessert made from qishta and starch that is topped with syrup and nuts.

== Preparation ==
The dish consists of a layer of semolina pudding, usually prepared by boiling milk, semolina, and rose water together in a pan, sometimes gum arabic is added, the mixture is poured into a tray and left to cool, a second layer of qishta is then prepared and added on top of the first layer after it had cooled.

After the pudding is done, the dessert is topped with nuts, pistachios, qatir, and sometimes rose petals.

The dish is refrigerated before serving.

== Consumption ==
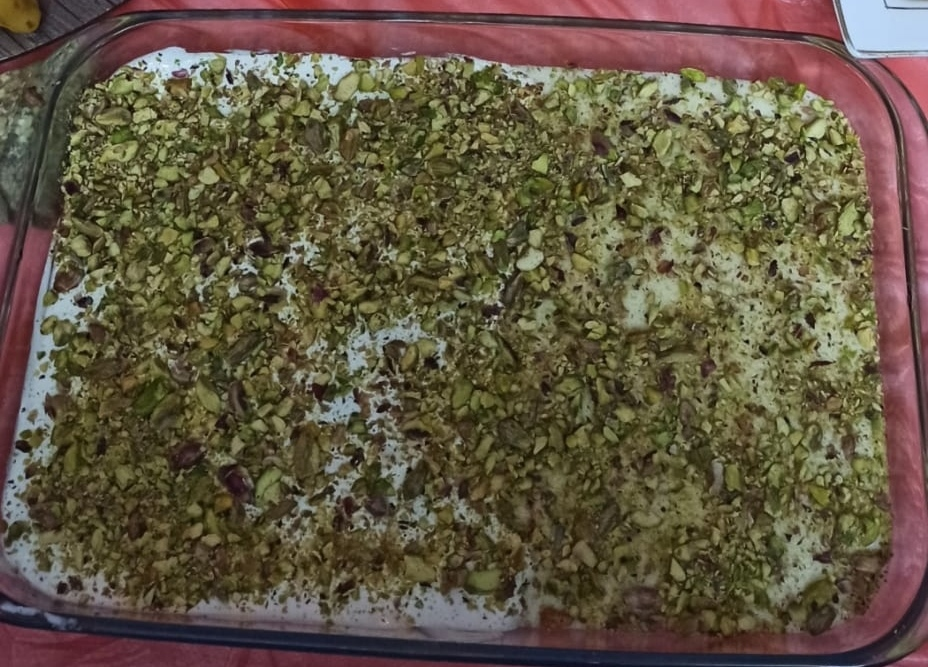
A tray of Layali Lubnan topped with pistachios

Layali Lubnan is one of the most common made-at-home desserts in Lebanon, its often made to celebrate holidays and special occasions. It is also considered a simple and cheap dessert compared to other traditional desserts. Outside of Lebanon, layali Lubnan is also common among Palestinians living in the Galilee.

== See also ==
- Muhallebi
- Zerde
- Halawet el Jibn
- Meghli
- Madlouqa
- Aish as-Saraya
