= Aish as-Saraya =

Arab dessert

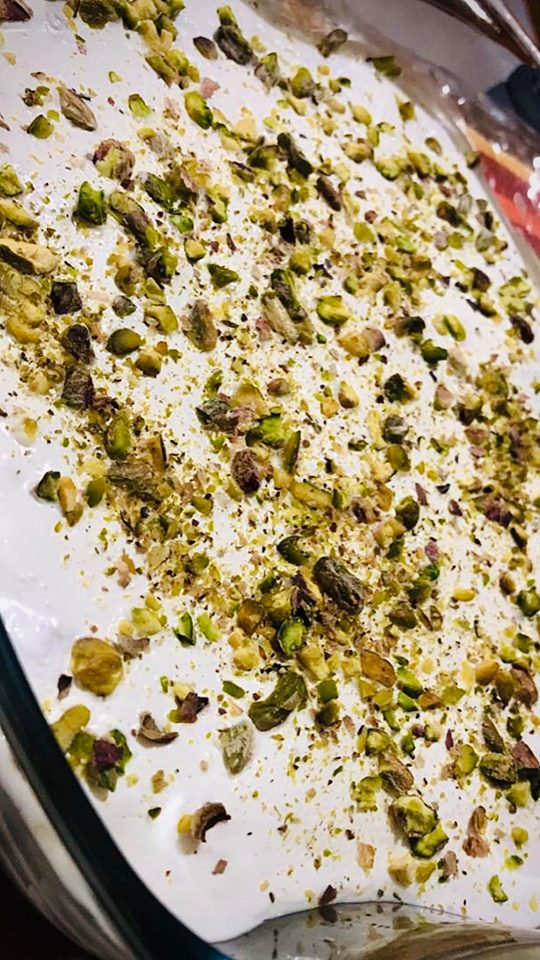
- Type: Dessert
- Place of origin: Arab world
- Main ingredients: bread, sugar, qishta, rosewater, orange blossom water, lemon juice, water

Aish as-Saraya (Arabic: عيش السرايا, lit. 'palace bread', in Egypt it is shortened "عيش" "bread") is an Arab dessert eaten regularly in the Levant and Egypt, consisting of syrup-soaked breadcrumbs topped with clotted cream and pistachios, and contains neither eggs nor butter. It is popular in the Arab world.

== Etymology ==
The name Aish as-Saraya translates to "bread of the royal palaces," the word saraya being of Turkish origin.

In Egyptian Arabic, Aish (Arabic: عيش, IPA: ʕayš) means bread, which is also the Arabic word for life.

== Preparation and Ingredients ==
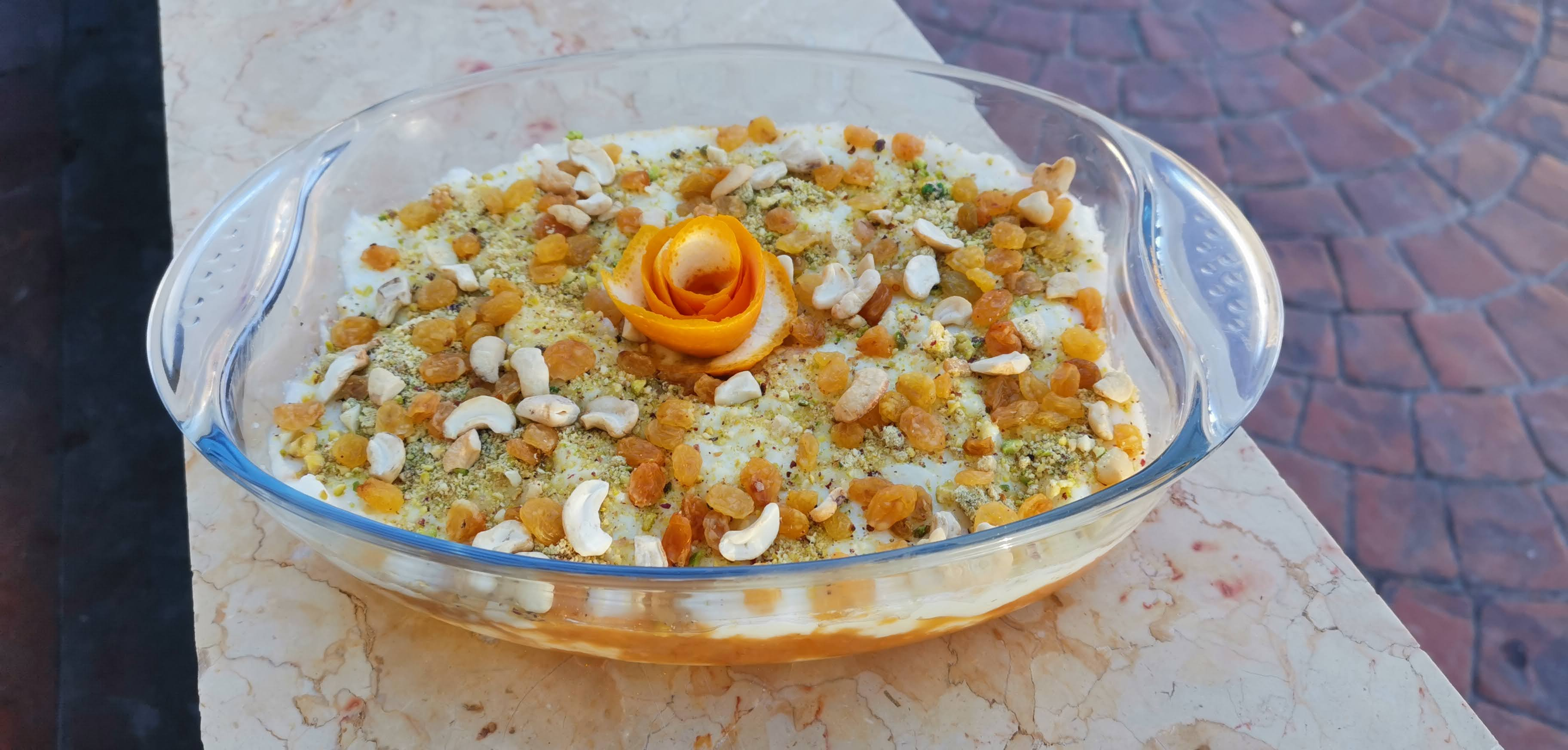
Aish as-Saraya, made with layers of toast bread and qishta, topped with nuts, fruits and qatir

Usually, Aish as-Saraya is made with a layer of finely shredded bread that is doused with syrup, with a second layer of cream on top of the bread layer, typically qishta, a type of clotted cream, is used, the dish is then topped with fruits and nuts.

Qatir is often mixed with the bread, and also used as garnish.

== History ==
The exact era and location from which the dessert originated is debated, with some attributing it to the Ottoman Empire, or even the much older Fatimid Caliphate.

The name Aish as-Saraya, meaning "bread of the palace", is said to have been given to the dish due to the fact that it originated from palaces which were plentiful in the region, in which ingredients like qishta, nuts, and bread, which were too expensive for the common man, were readily available.

According to historian Mary Isin, saray etmeği (meaning "palace bread") was a popular pudding in the Ottoman empire during the 19th century, it was made from kaymak (a form of clotted cream) and the crusts of fine white bread loaves that were baked in the Sultans kitchen, eventually, the bread was replaced by a form of rusk called a "Damascus rusk". An 1895 Arabic-English dictionary by author Socrates Spiro described aish as-saraya as a "kind of Turkish cake eaten with cream".

== In popular culture ==
A book titled "The Aish Al-Saraya Incident and Attendant, Amusing Events" (Arabic: حادثة عيش السرايا وما يتعلّق بها من وقائع مسلية) by Sudanese author Hammour Ziada was released in Arabic, its name directly referencing the dessert.

ِAnother Arabic book with a title referencing the dessert was written by Egyptian author Saeed Hajjaj, titled Aish as-Saraya..and other texts (Arabic: عيش السرايا.. ونصوص أخرى).

== Similar Dishes ==
Madlouqa (Arabic: مدلوقة) is a Levantine cold-served dessert made from a layer of semolina flour that is toasted with butter, similar to suji ka halwa, or a layer of knafeh (kadayif), which is then topped with a second layer made from qishta, and finally garnished with nuts and syrup.

Layali Lubnan (meaning "Lebanese nights") is another layered dessert with a base layer of semolina pudding, a second layer of qishta, which is then garnished with syrup, nuts and rose petals.

== See also ==
- List of desserts
- Bread pudding
- Layali Lubnan
