= Rozz me'ammar =

Egyptian baked rice casserole

Rozz meʻammar Egyptian Arabic: رُزْ مَعَمّرْ Arabic: أرْزْ مَعَمّرْ
- Place of origin: Egypt
- Main ingredients: Rice, milk, and butter
- Ingredients generally used: Salt, pepper, eshta, and cardamom

Rozz meʻammar (Egyptian Arabic: رُزْ مَعَمّرْ Arabic: أرْزْ مَعَمّرْ) is an Egyptian baked rice dish that combines rice with dairy products such as milk, butter, and sometimes eshta, resulting in a rich and creamy casserole. This dish is often prepared for special occasions and family gatherings due to its indulgent nature.

== Preparation ==
To prepare rozz meʻammar, short-grain rice is thoroughly washed and soaked to remove excess starch. The rice is then combined with milk, butter, and sometimes eshta in a baking dish, normally in a traditional clay pot known as a "beram" or a "bram". Salt and pepper are added for seasoning. The mixture is baked in the oven until the rice absorbs the liquids and develops a golden-brown crust on top. Some variations of the dish include adding chicken or meat to make it a more substantial meal.

Another version involves heating milk with spices such as cardamom and mastic to infuse it with additional flavors before combining it with the rice. The seasoned milk is then poured over the rice in a buttered baking dish, and the mixture is baked until the rice is tender and the top is bubbly and browned.

== See also ==
- Egyptian cuisine
- List of Middle Eastern dishes
- List of African dishes
