= Semolina pudding =

Porridge-type pudding made from semolina

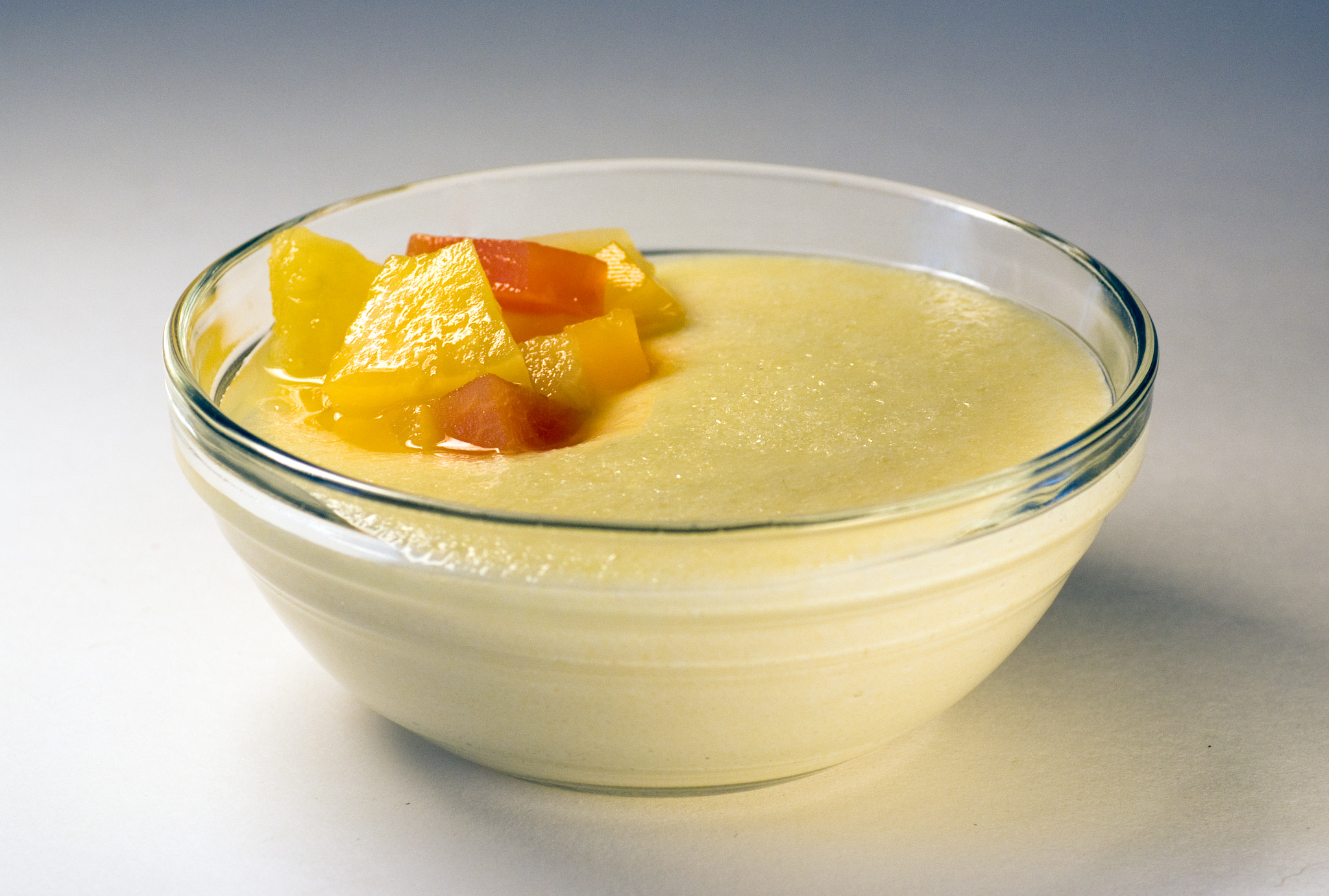
- Semolina pudding with fruits
- Alternative names: kasza manna, krupičná kaše, krupicová kaša, griș cu lapte, budincă de griş, tejbegríz, tejbedara, Grießbrei, Mamonia
- Type: Pudding, porridge
- Region or state: Central and Eastern Europe
- Serving temperature: Warm or chilled
- Main ingredients: Semolina, milk, sugar
- Variations: Water instead of milk

Semolina pudding or semolina porridge is a porridge-type pudding made from semolina, which is cooked with milk, or a mixture of milk and water, or just water. It is often served with sugar, cocoa powder, cinnamon, raisins, fruit, or syrup. It is similar to grain based halva or halawa. A similar consistency to rice pudding can also be made by using more semolina and by baking, rather than boiling.

Semolina pudding has been eaten in Europe since Roman times. The recipe book of Apicius (roughly dated 4th century AD) describes a semolina porridge made from farina mixed with almonds, raisins and raisin wine.

Semolina pudding is also for sale as an instant (powdered) or prepared convenience food. Cream, vanilla, fruit, spices or artificial flavouring is often added. Some of these products must be prepared with milk or water. If only water is necessary, then powdered milk is often an ingredient of the convenience food.

== By region ==
=== Czech Republic, Slovakia, Austria, Germany, Slovenia, Croatia ===
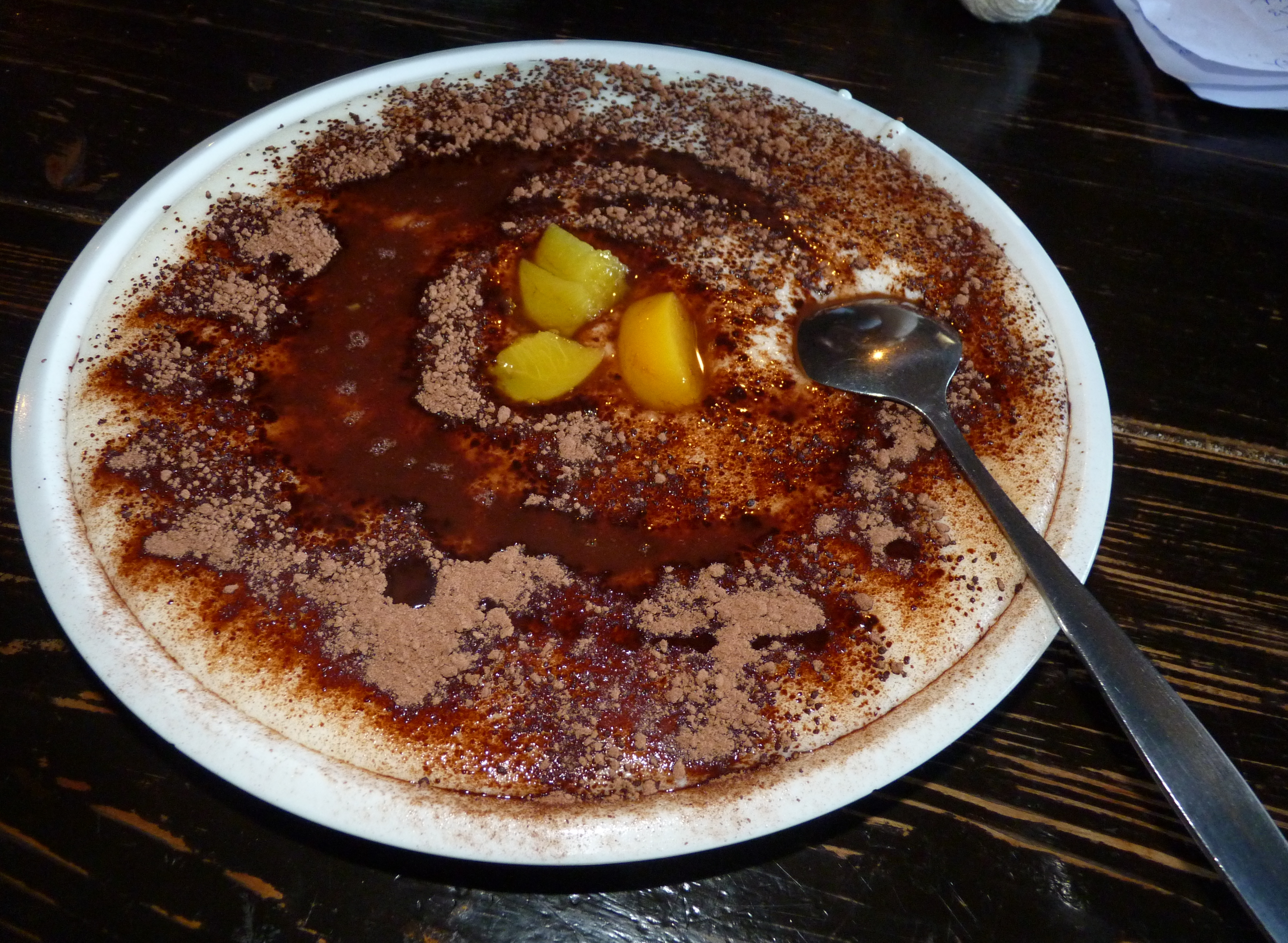
Semolina pudding with cocoa and butter

The Czechs call it krupičná kaše or krupicová kaše, the Slovaks krupicová kaša, the Austrians Grießkoch, the Germans Grießbrei, the Slovenians kaša iz pšeničnega zdroba, and the Croatians call it griz. It is served warm, sprinkled with cocoa and sugar, and doused with melted butter. Sometimes other variations and flavours may be used, such as cinnamon, honey, cherry compote, grated chocolate, tuzemák, etc.

=== Romania ===
In Romania it is called griș cu lapte. Jam, candied fruit, cinnamon and raisins may be added. Once cooked, the preparation is poured into a cake pan. It is served warm or cold. The word griș may come from German Grieß similar to the English grit.

=== Hungary ===
Hungarians call this dish tejbegríz or tejbedara, meaning "semolina in milk". Usually cooked with a generous amount of sugar, some butter, and a pinch of salt. It is served warm either plain or sprinkled with cocoa powder, cinnamon sugar, sometimes with fresh or canned fruits, jam, vanilla, choco bits; modern additions include ice cream, whipped cream, brown sugar, maple syrup, candied fruit, granola, pumpkin seeds etc. A similar but much thicker pudding-like product, precooked and packaged as a store-bought convenience food, is marketed under the name grízpuding (mirror translation for semolina pudding).

=== Lithuania ===
In Lithuania, this dish is called manų košė. Usually, it is cooked in a mixture of water, milk and sugar, and is always served warm, with a topping of cinnamon and sugar, or sometimes jam.

=== Levant ===
In the Levant, semolina pudding is used as a ingredient in making tamriyeh (Arabic: تمرية), a dessert made by cutting rose-water flavored semolina pudding into squares, wrapping it in filo pastry, frying it, and topping it with powdered sugar and syrup. It is often associated with the city of Nablus, and is popular elsewhere, like Lebanon and Egypt.

Nabulsi cheese is a component of some Levantine semolina puddings.

==== Palestine ====
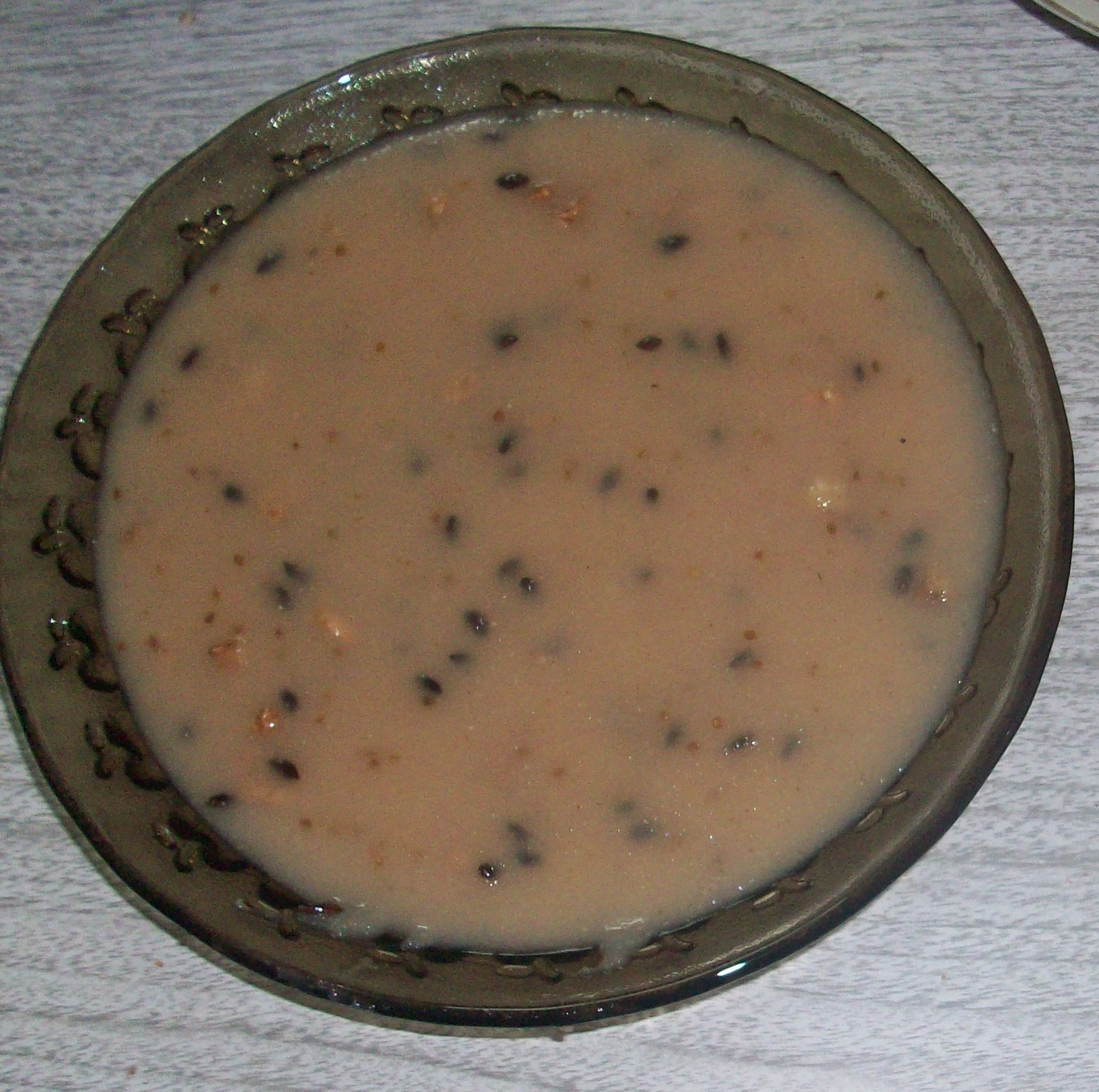
Khabeesa, from Hebron

Khabeesa (Arabic: خبيصة) is a traditional semolina pudding made using grape juice that is mixed with semolina flour and flavored with seeds, it is popular in the city of Hebron, in the West Bank.

==== Syria ====
This dish is well known in Damascus and Aleppo (as well as other parts of Syria) as Mamonia (Arabic: مأمونية), it is thought to have been named after Caliph al-Ma'mun, who ruled over medieval Syria. It is prepared by adding butter-toasted semolina into boiling water that is mixed with sugar and sometimes cinnamon pieces. It is then served with a variety of toppings including but not limited to white cheese, cinnamon powder and pistachios.

==== Lebanon ====
In Lebanon, semolina pudding is used as a component in making Layali Lubnan, where a layer of rose water-flavored semolina pudding is topped with a layer of qishta, and then various toppings like nuts and qatir.

=== United Kingdom ===
In British cuisine, semolina pudding is made with milk and sugar.

== See also ==
- Cream of Wheat
- Halva
- List of porridges
- Sago pudding
- Rice pudding
- Tapioca pudding
- Milk kissel
- Suji ka halwa
