= Fakhfakhina =

Fruit salad eaten in Egypt

Fakhfakhina فخفخينا
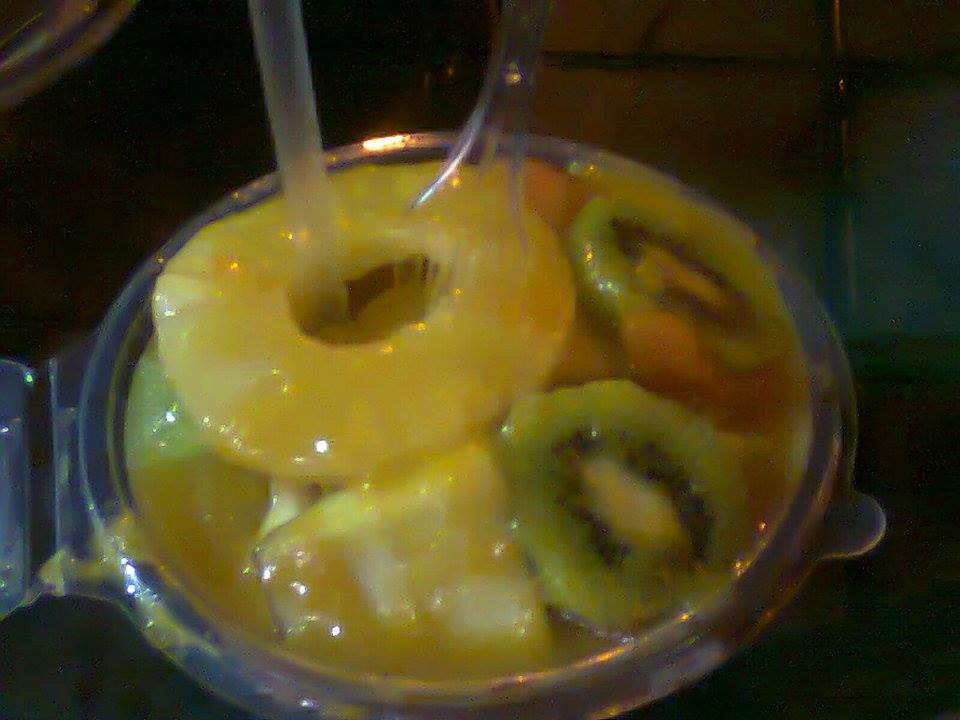
- Type: Fruit salad
- Place of origin: Egypt
- Main ingredients: Seasonal fruits

Fakhfakhina (Egyptian Arabic: فخفخينا) is an Egypt fruit salad that combines a variety of fresh seasonal fruits, fruit juices, and often a scoop of ice cream, making it a popular choice for Egyptians during hot summer months.

== Preparation ==
To prepare fakhfakhina, an assortment of fresh fruits such as mangoes, apples, peaches, bananas, and strawberries are chopped into bite-sized pieces. These mixed fruits are then combined in a bowl. In a separate bowl, pineapple juice and orange juice are mixed together. Each serving cup is filled with a portion of the mixed fruits and topped with the juice blend. A layer of eshta is spread evenly over each cup, and optional toppings like honey and crushed nuts can be added for extra flavor and texture. Some variations also include a scoop of vanilla ice cream on top, enhancing the dessert's richness and appeal.

== See also ==
- List of desserts
