= Qatayef =

Arab stuffed pancakes

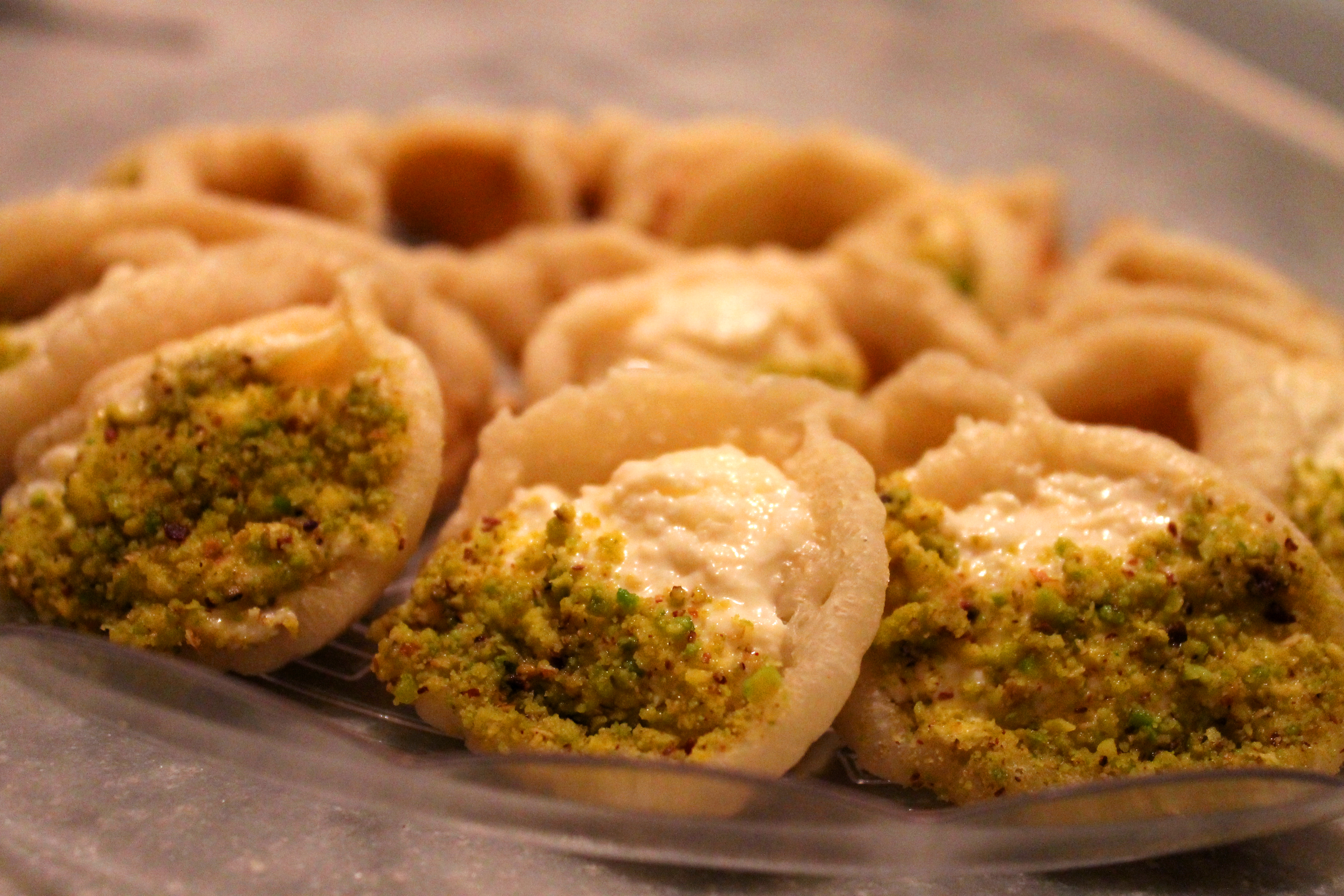
- Qatayef asafiri, with cream and nut filling
- Alternative names: Yassi kadayif
- Type: Dumpling, pancake
- Place of origin: Middle East
- Region or state: Egypt, Levant
- Main ingredients: Semolina flour, flour, sugar, yeast

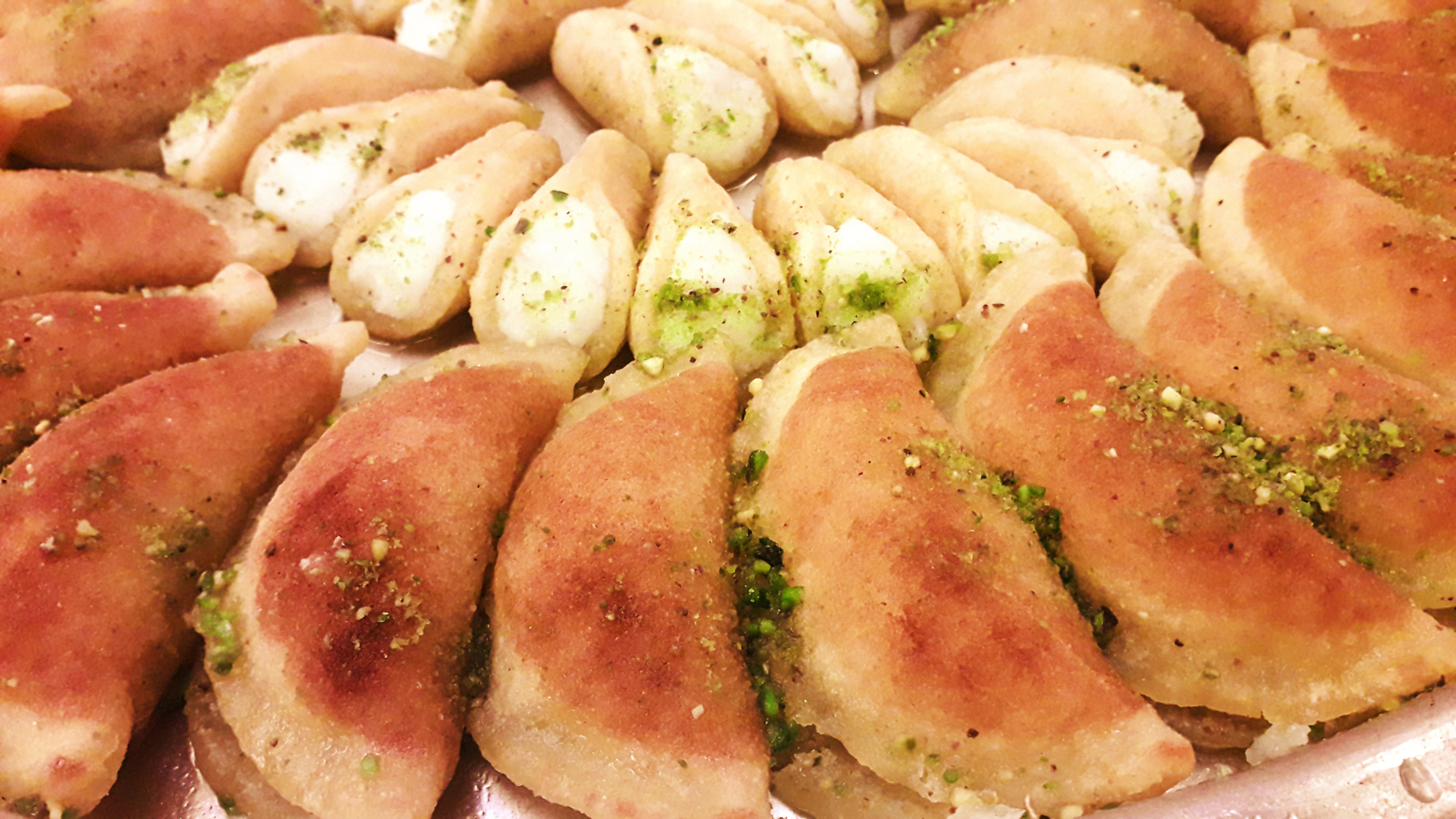
Assorted qatayef

Qatayef, katayef, atayef or qata'if (Arabic: قطايف [qɑˈtˤɑ:jɪf]) is an Arabic dessert. It is a type of sweet dumpling filled with cream and nuts, or a filled folded pancake with a thickness similar to a Scottish crumpet. It is prepared by pouring batter onto a hot surface, cooking it on one side, it is then stuffed, folded, and then fried, baked, or eaten fresh.

In many Middle Eastern countries such as Jordan and Egypt, qatayef is regarded as a seasonal specialty tied closely to Ramadan, appearing in markets and bakeries almost exclusively for the duration of that month. It is eaten daily after iftar and sometimes at suhoor, making it one of the most anticipated festive sweets of the Ramadan season.

== Etymology ==
The Arabic word qaṭaːyif (Arabic: قطايف) is derived from the Arabic root q-ṭ-f, meaning to pick up or to pluck. In Ottoman Turkish, the name yassi kadayif (lit. 'flat qatayif') came into use to differentiate between tel kadayıf (lit. 'hair qatayif', known as knafeh in Arabic) and the pancake known in Arabic as qatayef.

== History ==
Although some believe that qatayef originated in the Fatimid Caliphate (909–1171), their history dates back to the Abbasid Caliphate, 750–1258 CE. Qatayef was mentioned in a 10th century Arabic cookbook dating back to the Abbasid Caliphate by Ibn Sayyar al-Warraq called Kitab al-Ṭabīḫ (Arabic: كتاب الطبيخ, The Book of Dishes). The book also contained a recipe titled "Qatayef that were made for Harun al-Rashid"; an 8th century Caliph (786 – 809).

In Europe, qatayef is mentioned as cataif in the 13th-century Latin cookbook Liber de ferculis. During the 9th century, thin qatayef, then regarded as high quality, where used to wrap a type of marzipan to create lauzinaj. Medieval Arabic cookbooks typically used crushed almond as filling, one 13th century recipe provided Muhammad bin Hasan al-Baghdadi called for a filling of almond and sugar, and instructed to fry the qatayef in sesame oil after they are stuffed and folded.

Literary mentions of qatayef are plentiful in medieval Arabic literature, like the works of the poets Ibn al-Rumi, Ibn-Hussain al-Jazzar, and Ibn Nubata. 15th century Egyptian author Al-Suyuti wrote a letter titled Manhal al-laṭāyif fī alknāfh wāl qaṭāyif, with qatayef mentioned in the title, during a time in which the price of qatayef surged, which was protested by Egyptians.

Food historian Gil Marks noted that Ibn al-Qataifi (lit. 'son of the qatayef maker') was a surname of family of Jews in Egypt, highlighting qatayef's popularity.

An 1844 French-Syrian-and-Egyptian-Arabic by Swedish Orientalist Jacob Berggren described qatayef being made from a fine flour batter that is poured from a spoon into molds arranged on a pan, then eaten sweetened by honey or grape syrup. In 1935, German Orientalist Gustaf Dalman noted in his book Arbeit und Sitte in Palaestina ("Work and customs in Palestine") that Arabs in Palestine made kataif from flour, sourdough, and cold water, which were cooked on a pan and stuffed with nuts, and sometimes sent to a bakery to be baked in sesame oil. He compared them to European pancakes.

== Tradition ==
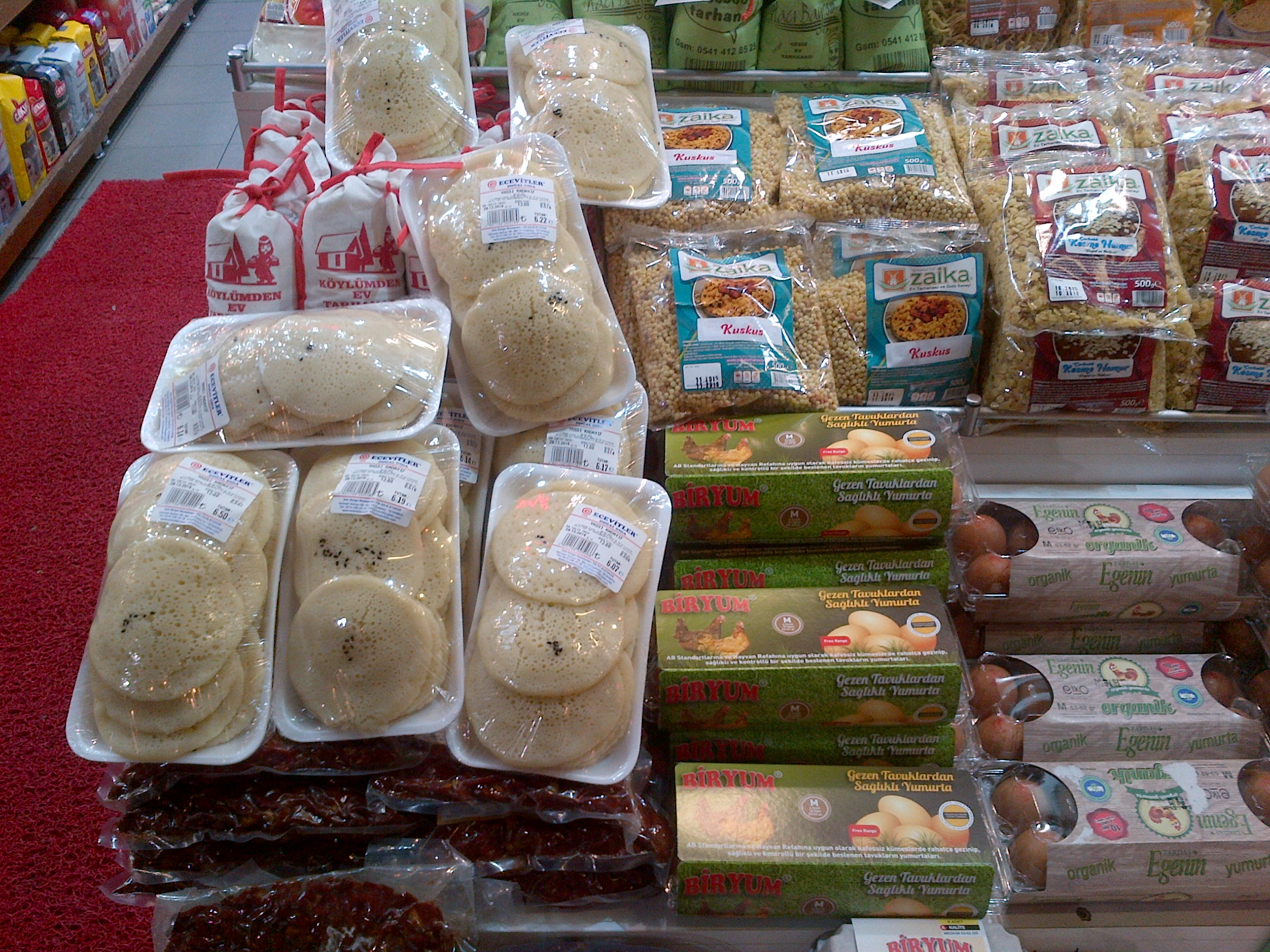
Yassı kadayıf, packaged for sale with nigella sativa seeds, Turkey

Arab Muslims commonly serve it during the month of Ramadan. Arab Christians, particularly in the Levant, also eat it during some celebrations, like Eid il-Burbara. Due to its ubiquity in Muslim communities during Ramadan, some Christians also consume qatayif during the Muslim holy month alongside Muslims. The ubiquity of qatayef is attributed to its ease of preparation and the affordability of its ingredients, making it available in areas like the Gaza Strip, or during the Lebanese liquidity crisis.

Outside the Arab world, qatayef are a Ramadan staple among Turkish Muslims, they are typically fried and eaten for iftar. Yassi kadayif ("Flat qatayef") are patented by the Turkish Patent and Trademark Office and have a geographic indication for the region of Malatya, the patent specifies that yassi kadayif is made from 3 different types of flour.

Qatayef is common during Ramadan in the regional cuisines of Egypt, Palestine, Lebanon, Jordan, Syria, and Turkey.

== Preparation ==
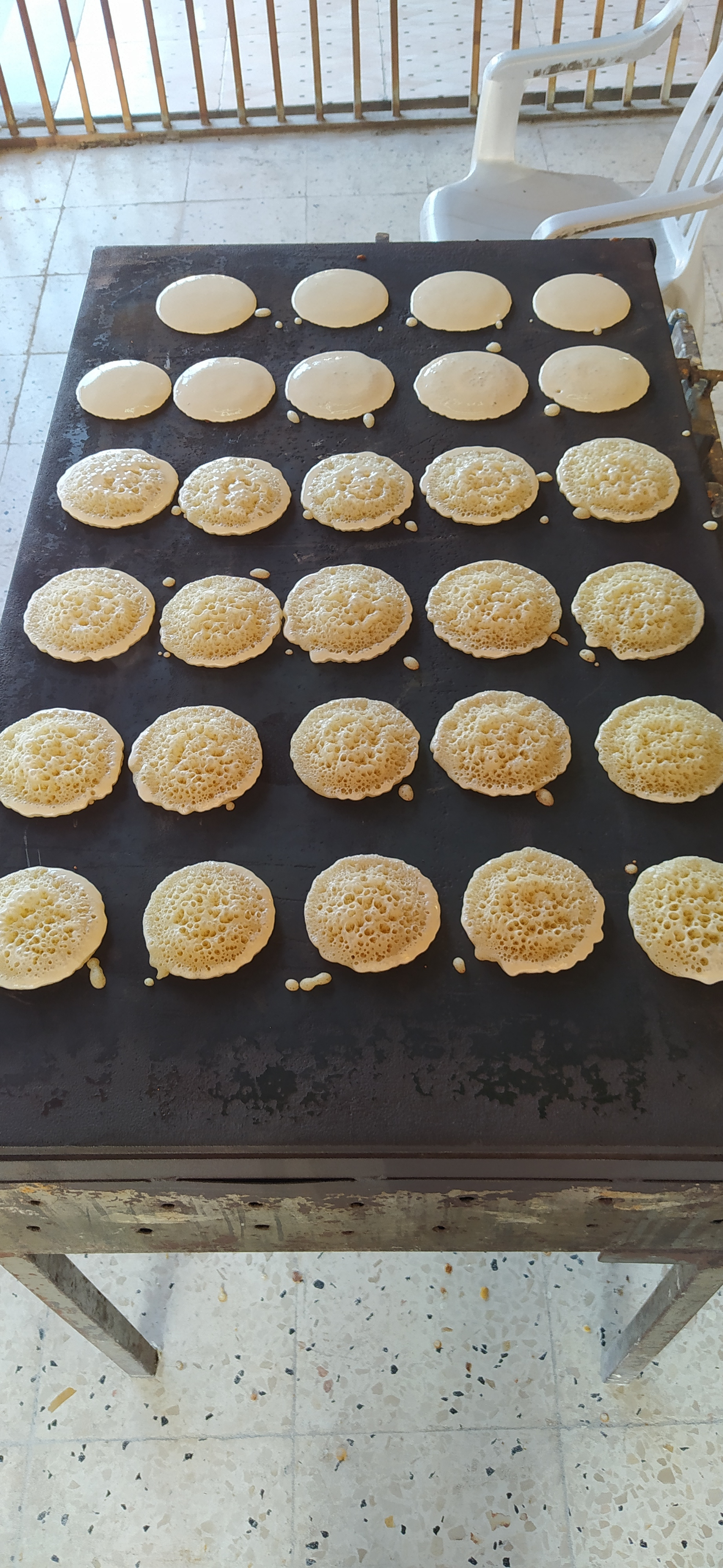
Qatayef being cooked on a hotplate, Salfit

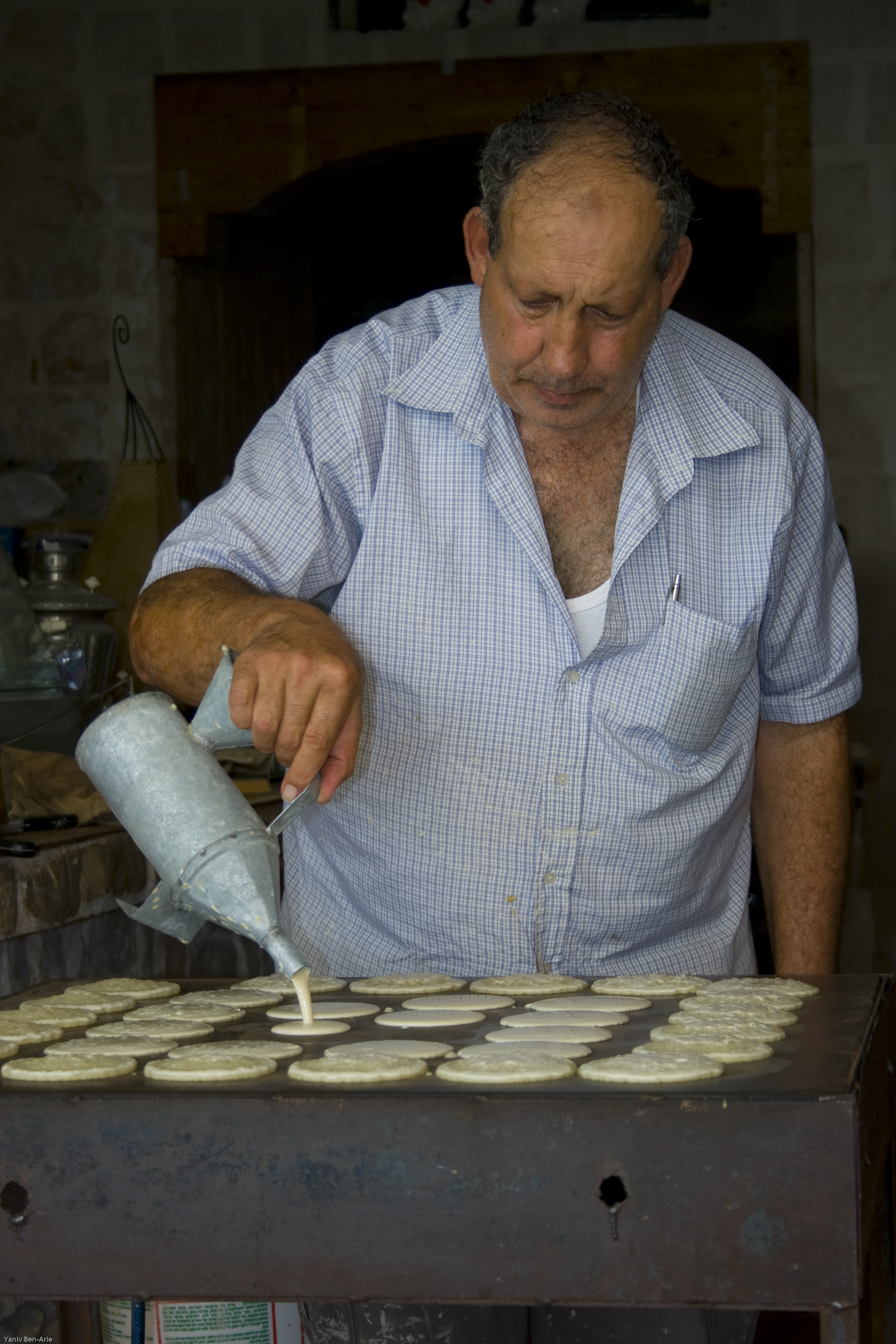
Qatayef is prepared manually by pouring batter onto a hot surface using a utensil. (Nazareth, 2007)

Qatayef is the general name of the dessert as a whole and, more specifically, the batter. It is usually made out of wheat or semolina flour, baking powder, water, yeast, and sometimes sugar. The result of the batter being poured onto a round hot plate appears similar to pancakes, except only one side is cooked, then stuffed and folded.

Although some vendors make qatayef manually, machines that automate automate the process exist. The machines work by automatically pouring the batter on a heated conveyor belt then passing them under a set of fans to cool down. Said machines can produce 50 kilograms of qatayef in under an hour.

Qatayef satati is deep fried (or baked) pastry filled with either unsalted sweet cheese a mixture of any of hazelnuts, walnuts, almonds, pistachios, raisins, powdered sugar, vanilla extract, rose extract, and cinnamon. It is served with a hot sweet syrup or sometimes honey. Assafiri qatayef (قطايف عصافيري) is filled with whipped cream or qishta (قشطة), folded halfway, and served it with scented syrup without frying or baking.

Qatayef was traditionally prepared by street vendors as well as households in Egypt and the Levant. Modern variations, with fillings such as Nutella, are also consumed.

== In pop culture ==
A 2025 Egyptian TV series by Sameh Hussein was named Qatayef, in reference to the sweet.

=== World records ===
The Guinness world record for largest piece of qatayef was set in Bethlehem, Palestine, in 2010, and had a mass of 104.75 kilograms (230.9 lb).

== Consumption ==
Qatayef are the most popular Ramadan dessert in several Arab countries; in Ramadan of 2015, Al Ghad reported that 120 million individual pieces of qatayef were consumed in Jordan, totaling 6 million kilograms, with other Ramadan desserts like asabe Zainab trailing behind. One store in Nazareth was reported to sell over 1 ton of qatayef per day in 2016.

=== Health concerns ===
The high sugar, fat, and calorie content of qatayef has been reported as a cause for health concerns, particularly when fried, in news outlets such as Al Jazeera Arabic, CNN Arabic, Al Arabiya, and Asharq Al-Awsat. These reports advise those with health issues to instead consume qatayef made of whole grain flour, use honey instead of qatir syrup, use a filling of nuts or low-fat cheese over the high-fat qishta, avoid deep-frying, or simply abstain.

== Gallery ==
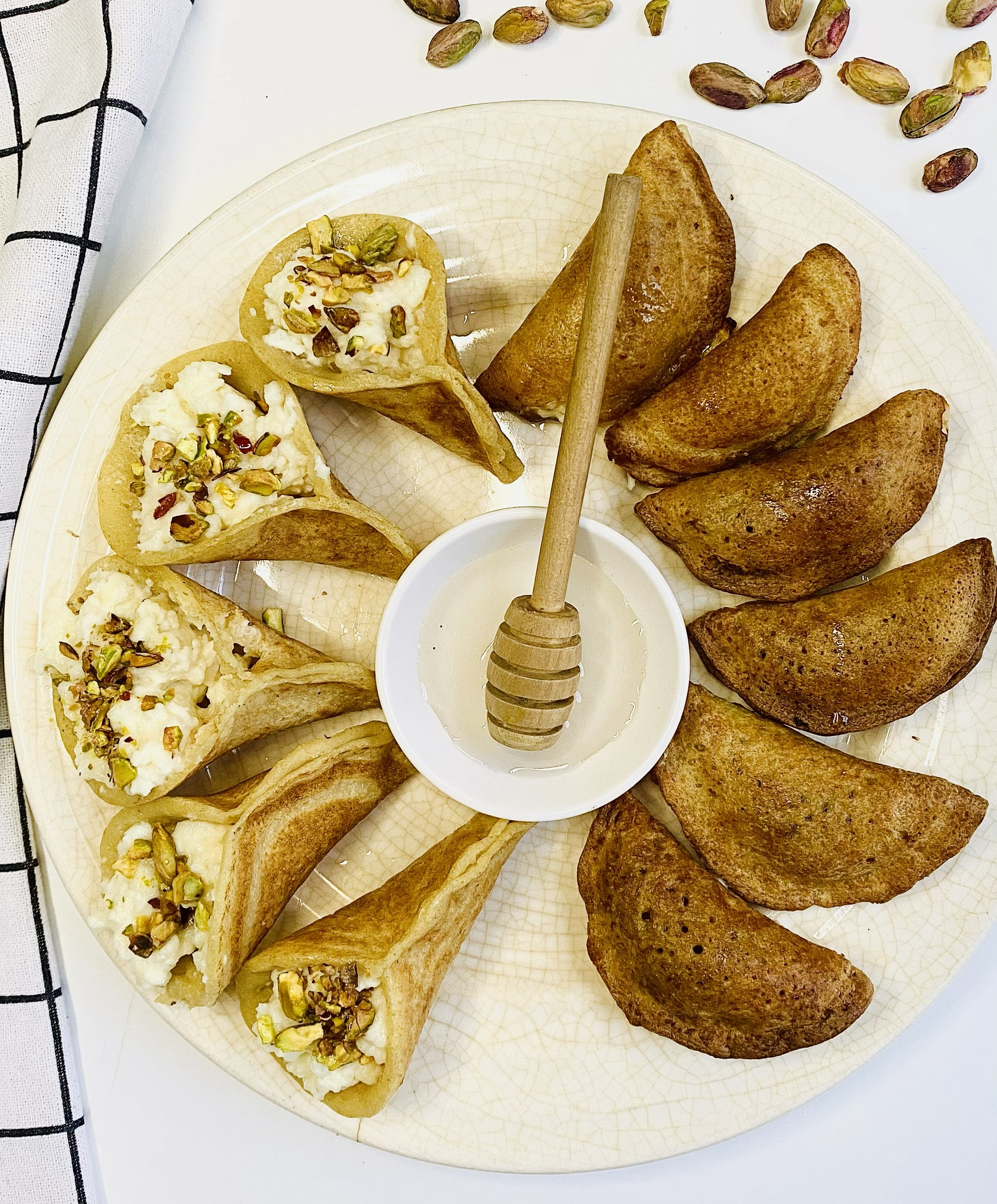
Levantine qatayef with syrup, served as a plain pancake or fried after being stuffed.

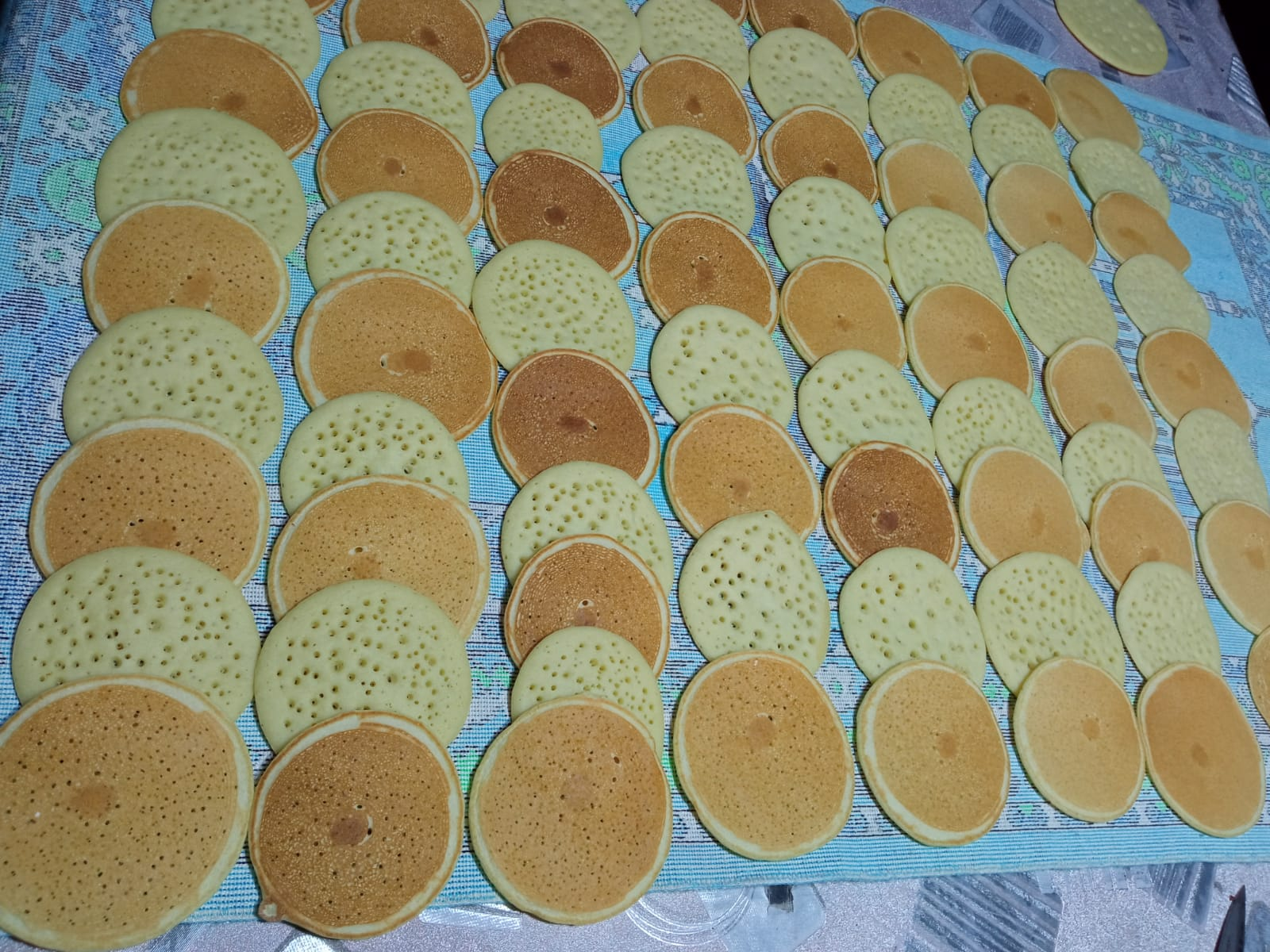
Home made qatayef, both sides visible.

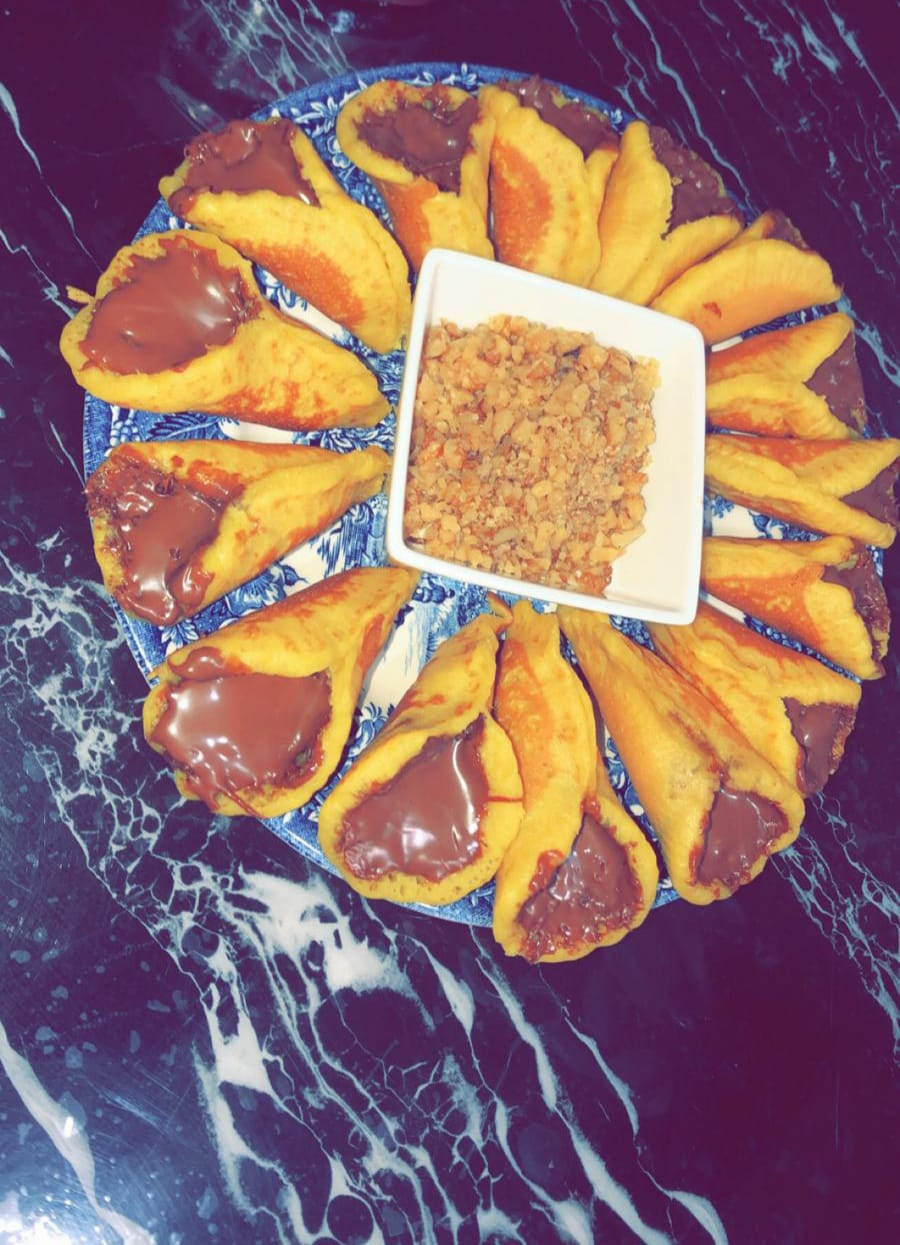
Contemporary qatayef with Nutella filling.

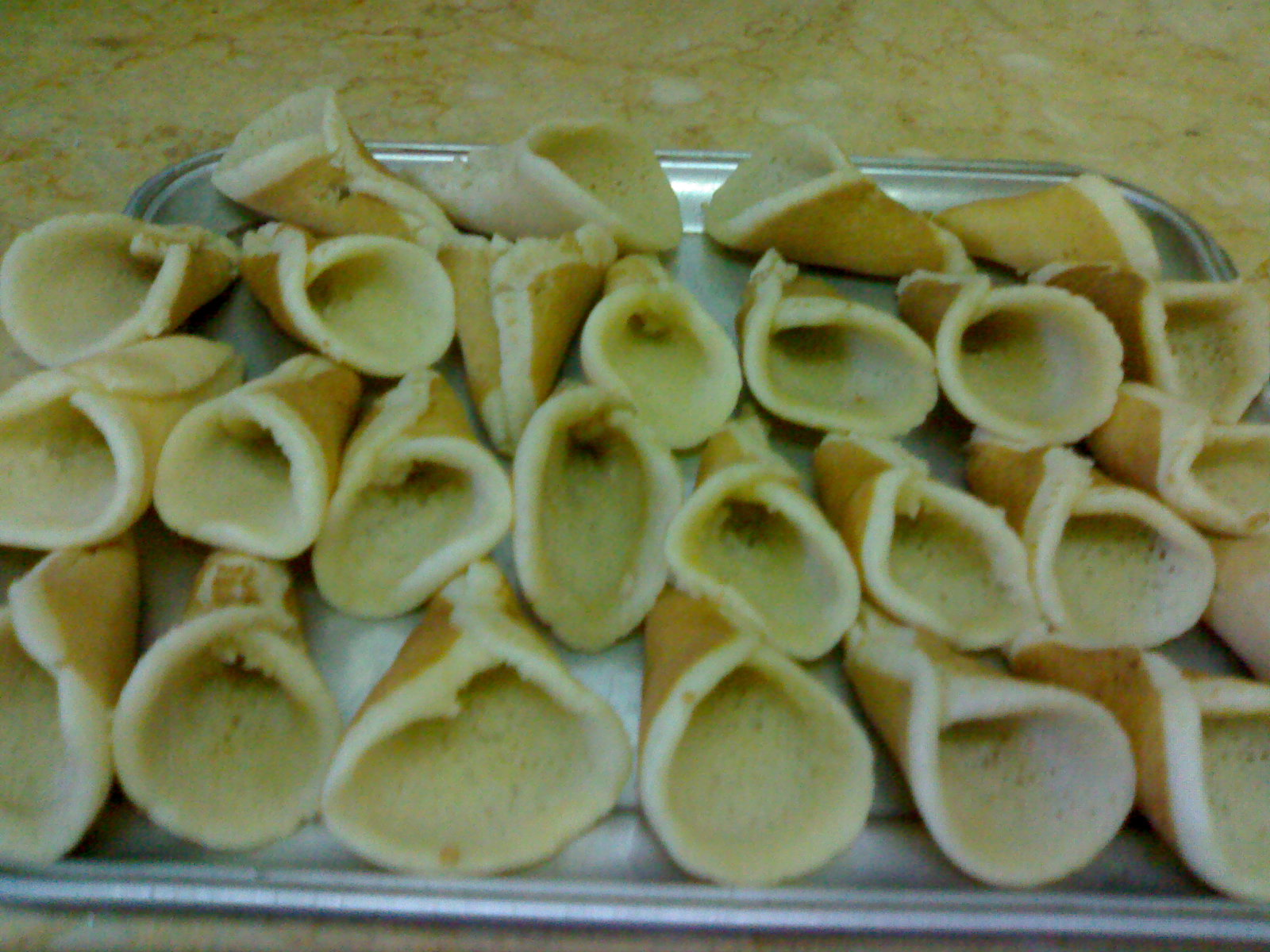
Folded qatayef, not yet stuffed or fried.

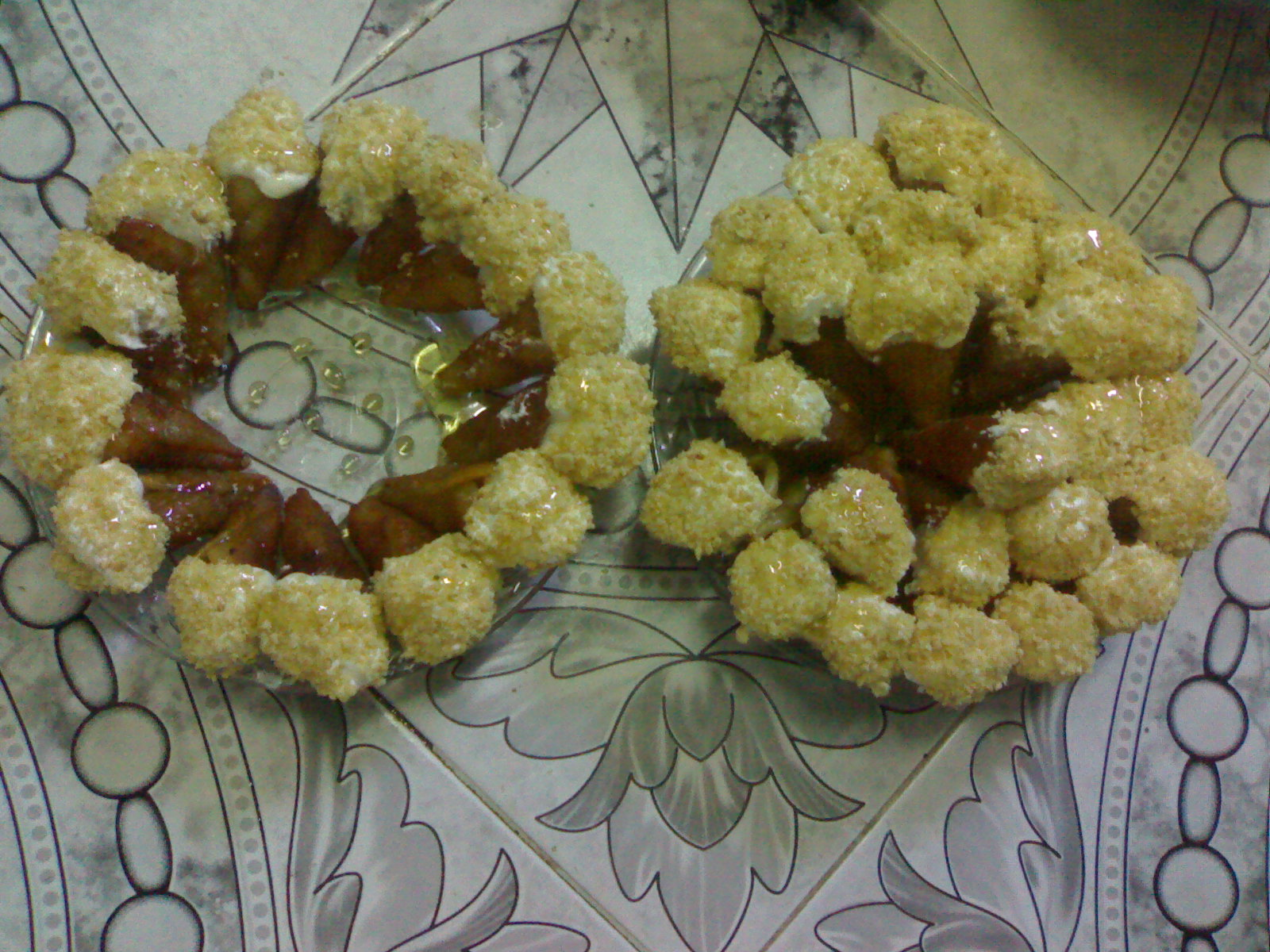
Qatayef, cone-shaped, fried, stuffed with qishta, topped with pistachios and qatir syrup.

== See also ==
- List of Middle Eastern dishes
- List of pancakes
- Mandugwa, a similar Korean dessert
- Knafeh
- Stuffed dates
