= Halawet el jibn =

Traditional Syrian dessert

Halawet el Jibn حلاوة الجبن
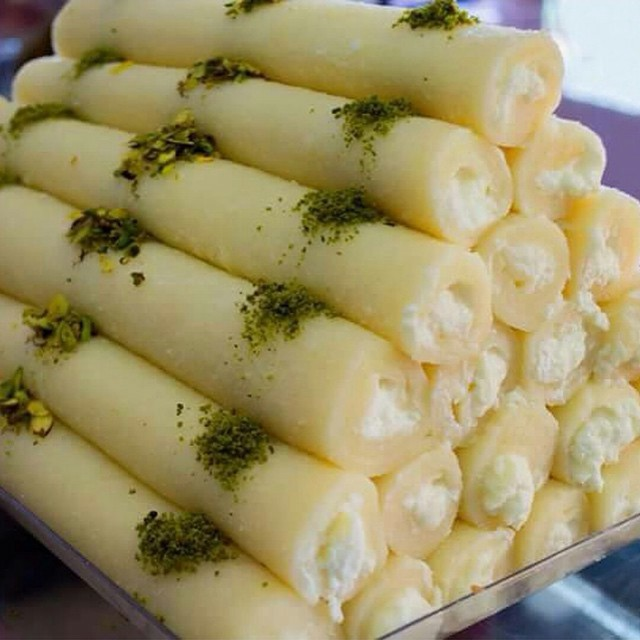
- Halawet jibn from Hama, Syria
- Type: Dessert
- Place of origin: Hama or Homs, Syria
- Associated cuisine: Levantine cuisine (especially Syria & Lebanon)
- Serving temperature: Room temperature
- Main ingredients: Semolina, Akkawi cheese, sugar, qishta, pistachio, rose water

Halawet el-jibn (Arabic: حلاوة الجبن, romanized: Ḥalāwat al-jibn, lit. 'cheese sweet') is a Syrian dessert made of a semolina and cheese dough, filled with qishta. Its origins are somewhere from central Syria. It is found in other regions in the Levant and the Middle East notably Tripoli, Lebanon, and has been brought by Syrian immigrants to other countries such as Turkey and Germany.

== History ==
The exact origin of the dessert is disputed. It is often claimed to have originated in the Syrian cities of Homs and Hama, and there is a long standing debated among the inhabitants of both cities over which city invented it. Some folk tales identify Tripoli, Lebanon as the origin.

The time period of its invention is also debated, its commonly believed to have been invented during the 19th or 20th centuries.

Syrian author Khayr al-Din al-Asadi described halawet el-jibn in his book "Comparative Encyclopedia of Aleppo", which was completed in 1971 and published posthumously in 1981. Al-Asadi described the dessert as a sweet made from sweet cheese, semolina, and samneh, and noted that it was popular during spring, when cheese was in season.

== Ingredients and preparation ==
The confection is made by toasting flour with butter while stirring syrup into the mix, making a type of roux, after it thickens, cheese is added and then the mix is kneaded. It is then eaten as is or rolled around a filling.

This dessert is primarily made of a semolina and cheese dough (containing traditionally Akkawi or Majdoola cheese, but also mozzarella or some mix of cheeses as alternatives), a sugar syrup locally called ʾaṭər (Levantine Arabic: قَطْر), and orange flower water or rose water. It is normally filled with cream or clotted cream (Levantine Arabic: قشطة, romanized: ʼəshṭa) and decorated with pistachio. Rose petal jam can be used as a garnish as well.

Arabic ice cream (booza) is a common topping for halawet el-jibn during summer.

== Variations ==
Maʻjūqah (معجوقة) is a dessert native to Hama made similarly to halawet el-jibn, where the semolina-cheese dough is spread on a plate rather than rolled, and then topped with qishta.

== Culture ==
The disputed origin of the dessert has become the subject of a longstanding, humorous rivalry between the Syrian cities of Hama and Homs, whose residents both claim the dessert as their own. In 2026, residents of Hama created a halawet-jibn roll over 100 meters long at a festival, which was reported to be the "longest ever". The purpose of the feat was to highlight the dessert as a symbol of the city's local culture.

== Gallery ==
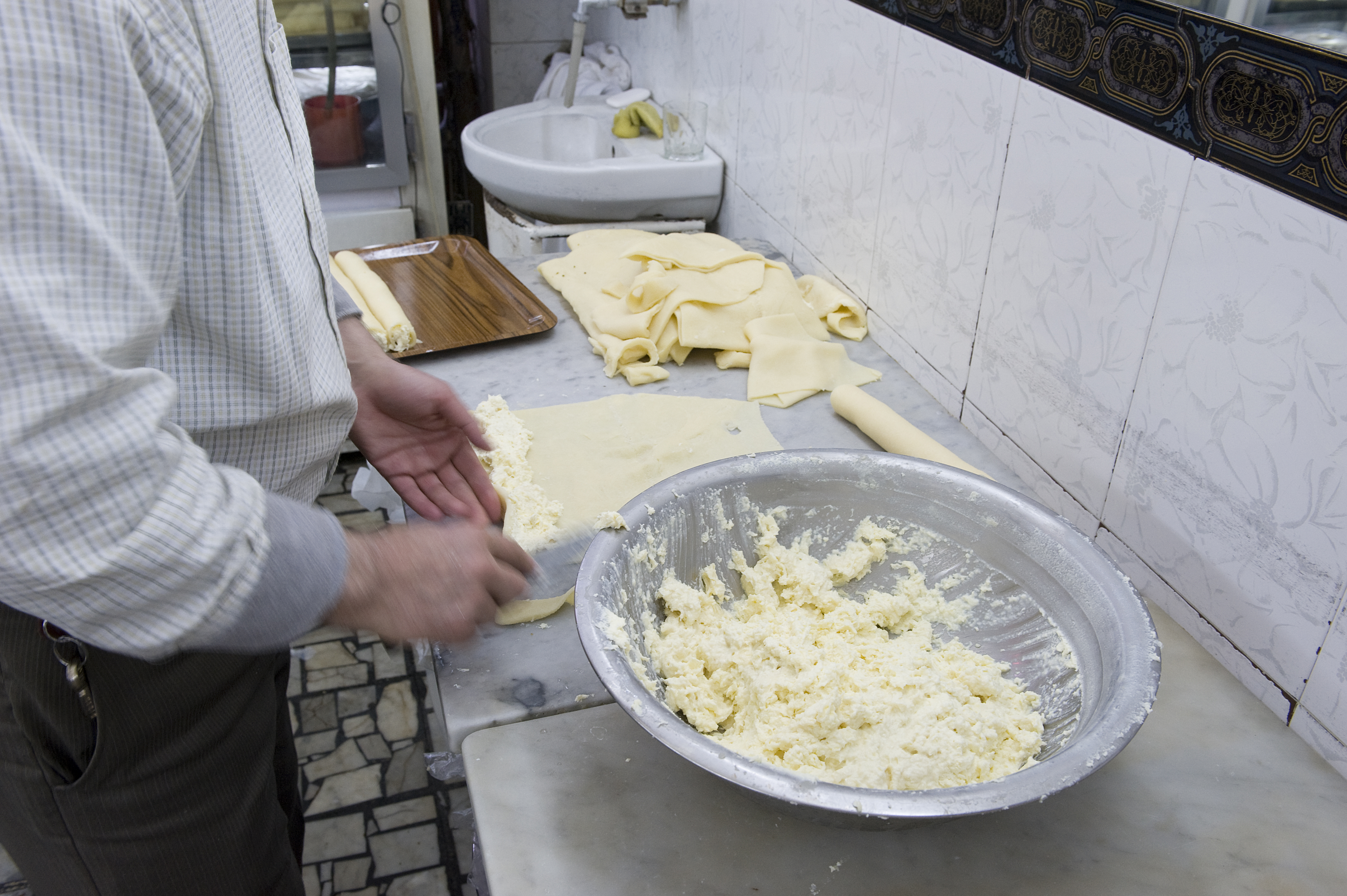
Halawet al-jibn being prepared in Hama, with cream filling

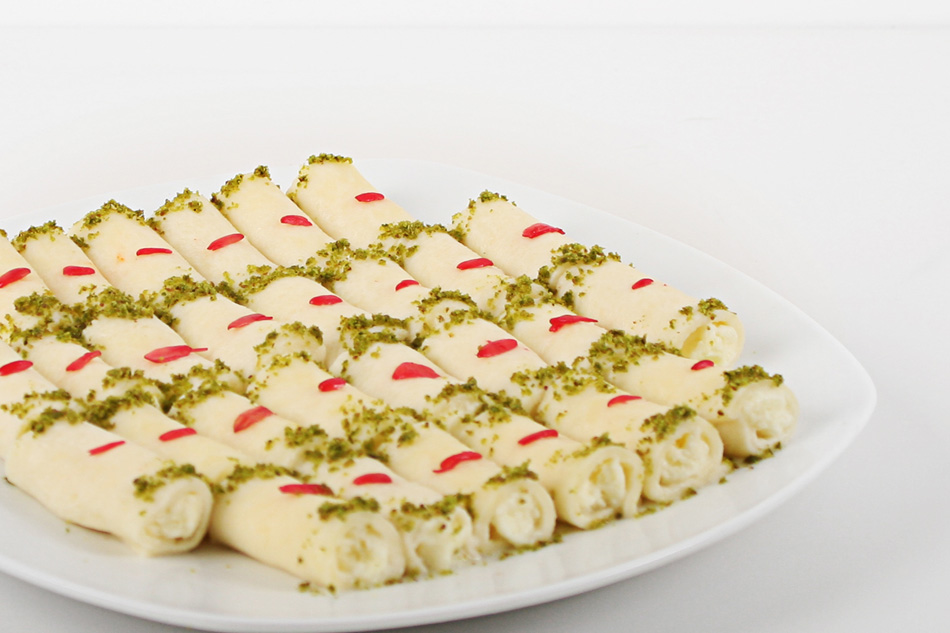
One variety of Halawat Al jibun

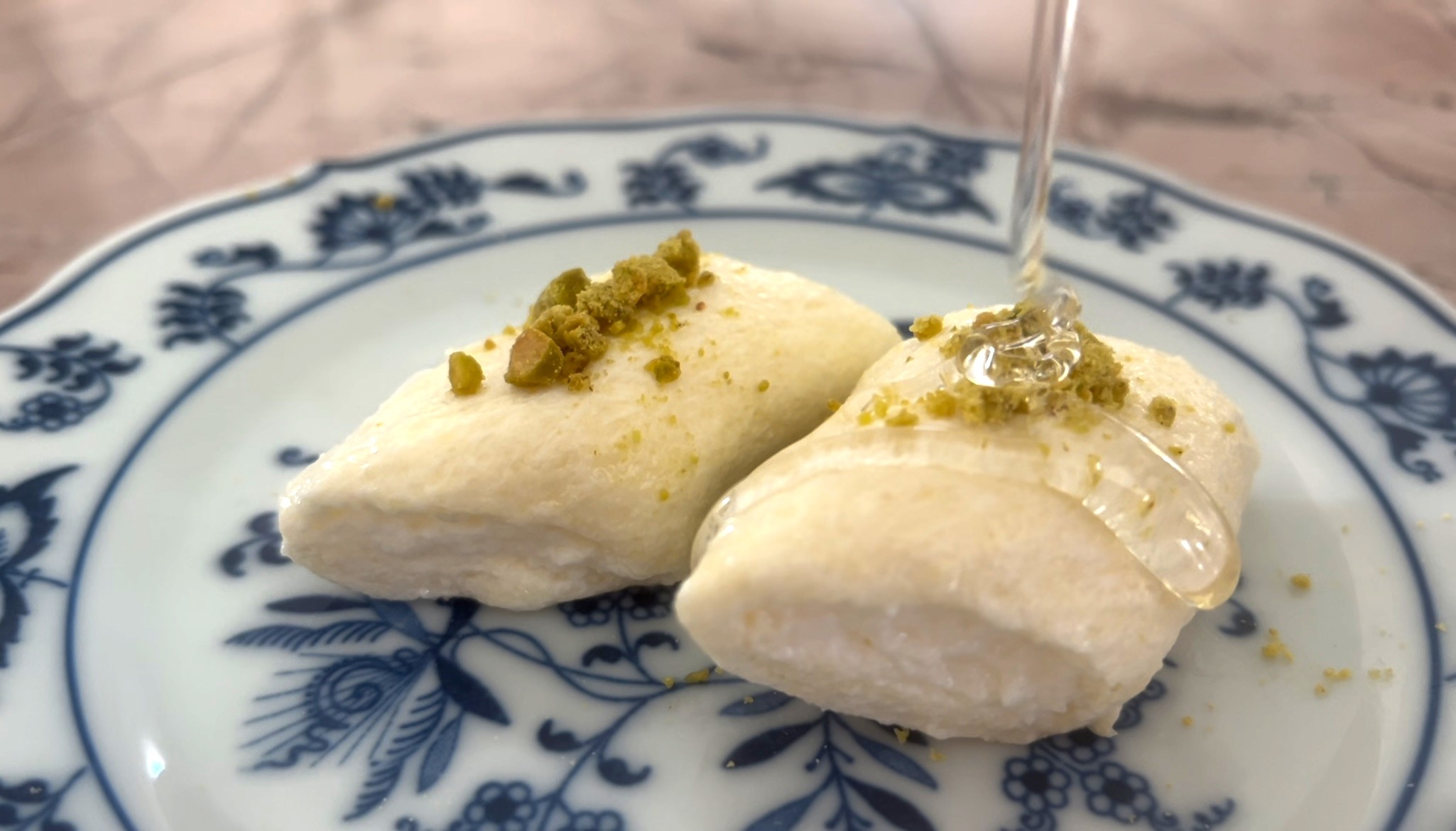
Qatir syrup being added to halawet el-jibn

== See also ==
- Blintz
- Barquillo
