= Qatir (syrup) =

Middle Eastern syrup

Qatir / Attar قَطْر
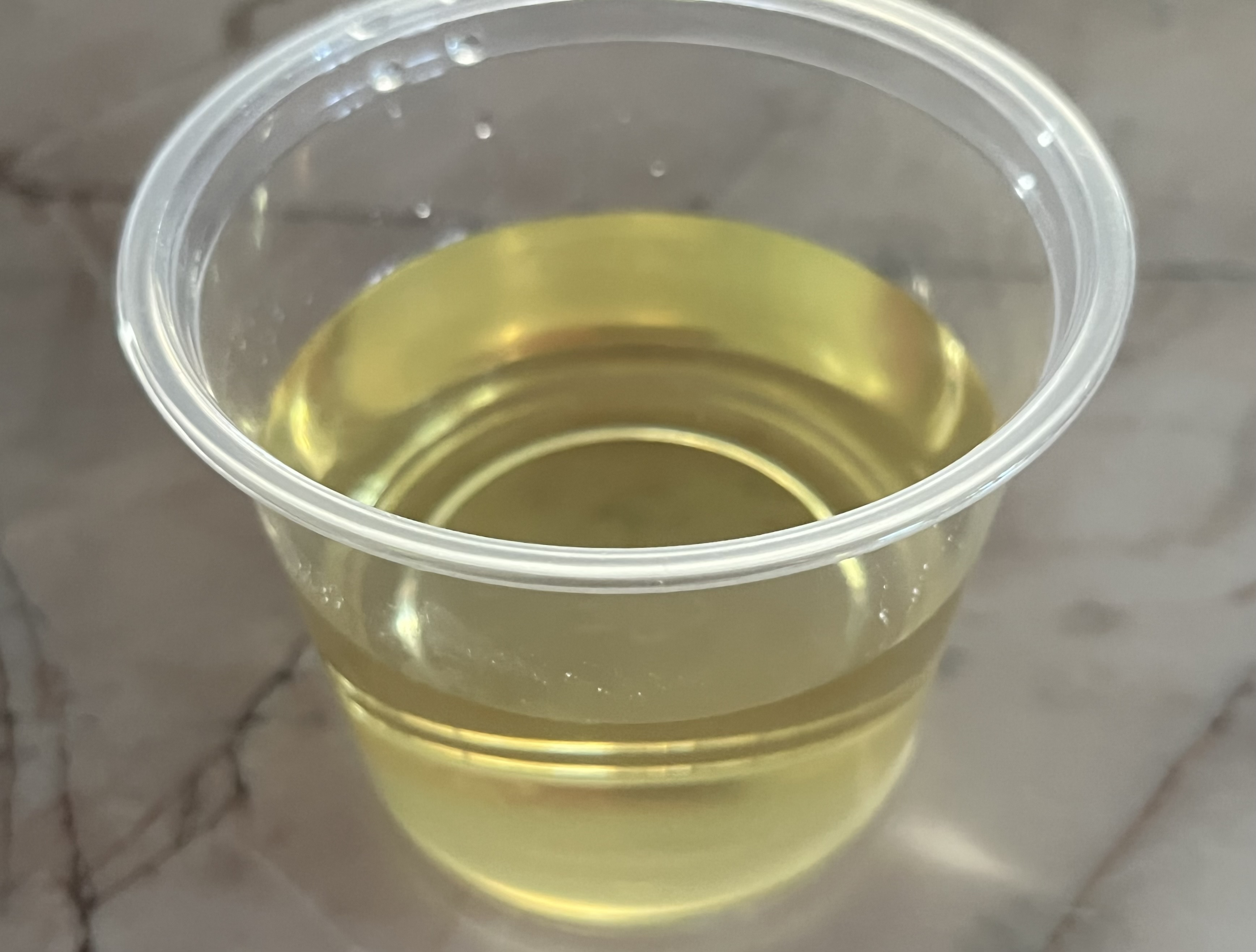
- Attar with rose water and orange flower water.
- Alternative names: Qattar / Qatr / Attar / Shħūr / Sheera
- Type: Syrup
- Main ingredients: Sugar, water

Qatir, qatr, sheera or attar (Arabic: قَطْر) is a type of sweet syrup used in the preparation of Middle Eastern desserts. It is made of primarily sugar and water, and is reduced slightly until somewhat golden and thicker. It is sometimes accented by steeping additional flavorings such as lemon juice, rose water or oil, or attar (a rose-hinted plant of similar name). It is an essential addition to many Arab desserts, and is added cold or at room temperature to a hot dessert after it is baked.

== Name ==
Qatir is also referred to as sheera (Arabic: شيرة), or as sharbat (sometimes sherbet) (Arabic: شربات) in Egyptian Arabic.

The name qatir is derived from the Arabic ʿutur (عطور) meaning "aromas".

== History ==
According to historian Gil Marks, the practice of adding sweet syrup to unsweetened desserts dates back to late antiquity, when honey was used in place of sugar in Persian cooking.

The 15th Century book Kanz al-fawāʾid contained a recipe for a syrup made by boiling honey and lemon juice in water, it also contains recipes for jullāb sugar-syrup, made by boiling sugar in water.

== Ingredients and Preparation ==
Qatir is usually prepared by boiling sugar in water, lemon juice is added to prevent sugar from crystalizing, lemon juice can accelerate breaking down sucrose into fructose and glucose.

The syrup is ordinarily scented with rose water or orange flower water, the exact ingredients and quantities may vary depending on the dish.

Some recipes may call for different sweeteners, such as honey as a "healthier" option.

== Usage ==
Qatir is used in a wide array of desserts, including but not limited to knafeh, baklava, qatayef, mutabbaq, and harisseh, it can be used hot or cold, and the desserts it can be added to can be hot or cold. The syrup may also be added while still boiling to some desserts, or be used when cold as a dip for some others. Qatir can be stored in a refrigerator for an extended period of time.

Arab cooks often forgo baking with sugar directly in the desserts and instead add sweetness by drizzling qatir onto the dessert after it is cooked, or even drenching it in qatir. Knafeh-dough based pastries, semolina cakes like basbousa, and baklava are typically not sweet on their own.

Such syrups are also used in Balkan cuisine, as many Balkan desserts are not sweet on their own, Greek or Balkan desserts that are soaked in syrup are called siropiasta.

== Gallery ==
Qatir is poured over knafeh.

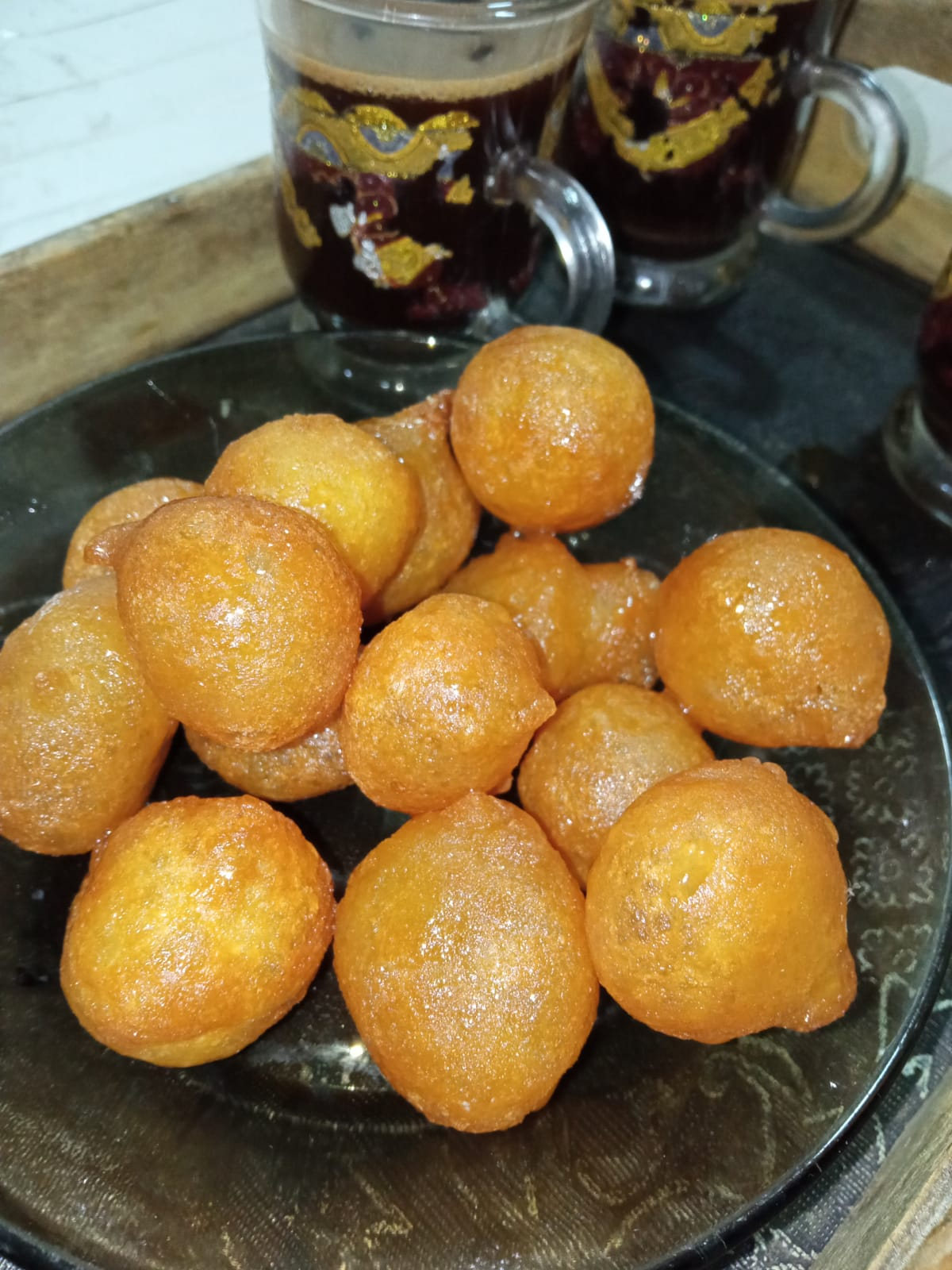
Lokma or awameh pieces are dipped in qatir.

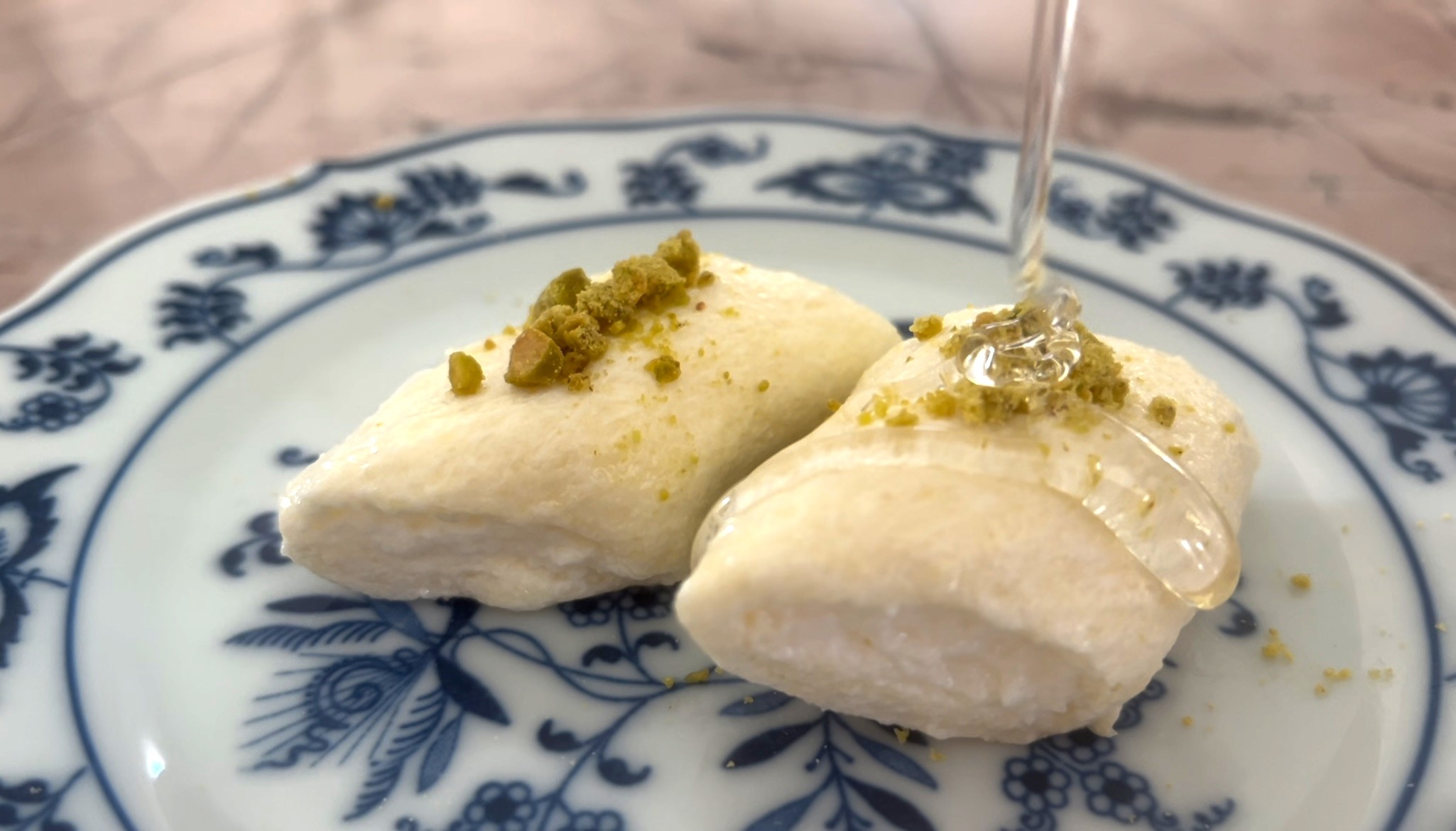
Qatir with a honey-like consistency is drizzled over halawet el Jibn

== See also ==
- List of syrups
