= Qishta =

Dairy coagulated milk product

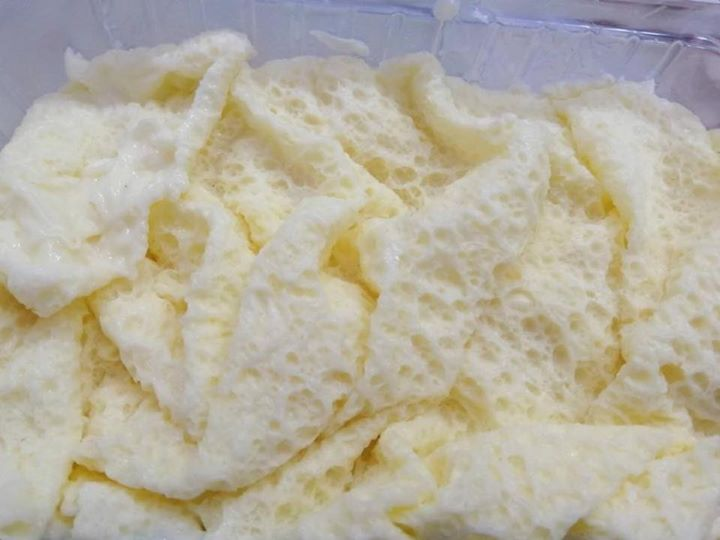
- Qishta
- Alternative names: Kashta, Ashta
- Type: Dairy
- Place of origin: Levant, Arab world
- Region or state: Arab world
- Main ingredients: Milk
- Similar dishes: Clotted cream, kaymak

Qishta (Arabic: قِشْطَة, romanized: qišṭa, pronounced [qiʃ.tˤa]), also known as kishta, kashta, ghishta, ashta or eshta, is a dairy coagulated milk product prepared from heated fresh milk used in different dishes and consumed as a dessert. It is found in Southern Mediterranean cuisines, including Levantine and Egyptian cuisines. It is sometimes scented with orange flower water. Qishta may be served with fruit, used to fill crêpes and pastries, or served with pistachios and sweet syrups. Qishta is "highly perishable" and, if improperly prepared or stored, may be a source of foodborne illness such as Listeria. It is similar to other heat-prepared dairy dishes such as kaymak and khoa.

== Preparation ==
Qishta is traditionally made by heating milk in wide, shallow pans until proteins coagulate and trap fat, forming a thick layer on the surface. The process takes several hours and is done without fermentation or added coagulants. Qishta is typically prepared in small dairies or bakeries. It has a short shelf life, lasting only a few days even if refrigerated.

The milk needs to be stabilized at a specific temperature (typically around 60 celsius) during the cooking process.

Unlike some other coagulated dairy products, the preparation process remains traditional for qishta, so it is neither fermented nor coagulated through chemical or microbial means.

Some cooks may add cornstarch of flour to thicken the cream to make qishta pudding (Arabic: قشطة مطبوخة), as opposed to fresh qishta.

== History ==
Heat-prepared creams similar to modern day qishta and kaymak were mentioned in medieval Arabic cookbooks. An Egyptian 13-14th Century cookbook titled Kanz al-fawāʾid provides a recipe for it, it calls for heating milk, letting it cool so that the cream accumulates, then collecting the cream.

An 1895 Egyptian Arabic-English dictionary by author Socrates Spiro translated qishta (قشطة) "cream".

== Uses ==
Qishta is used in a wide array of desserts. It can be incorporated into puddings, juices, pastries, and cocktails, or just eaten fresh as-is. It is also used as a topping or filling. Dishes which incorporate it as an ingredient include Layali Lubnan, qatayef, othmalliyya, and rice pudding.

== Gallery ==
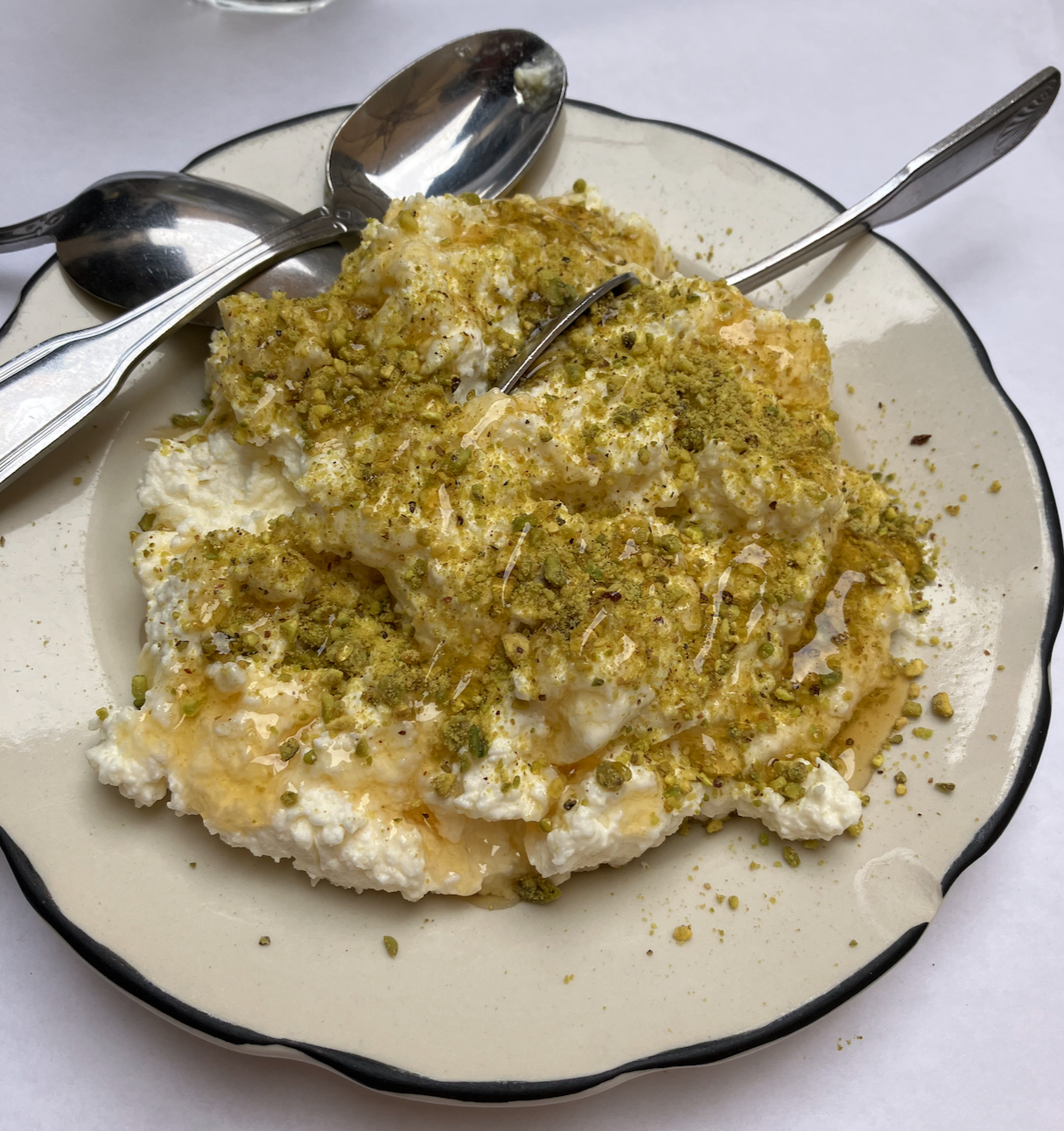
Qishta topped with pistachios and honey

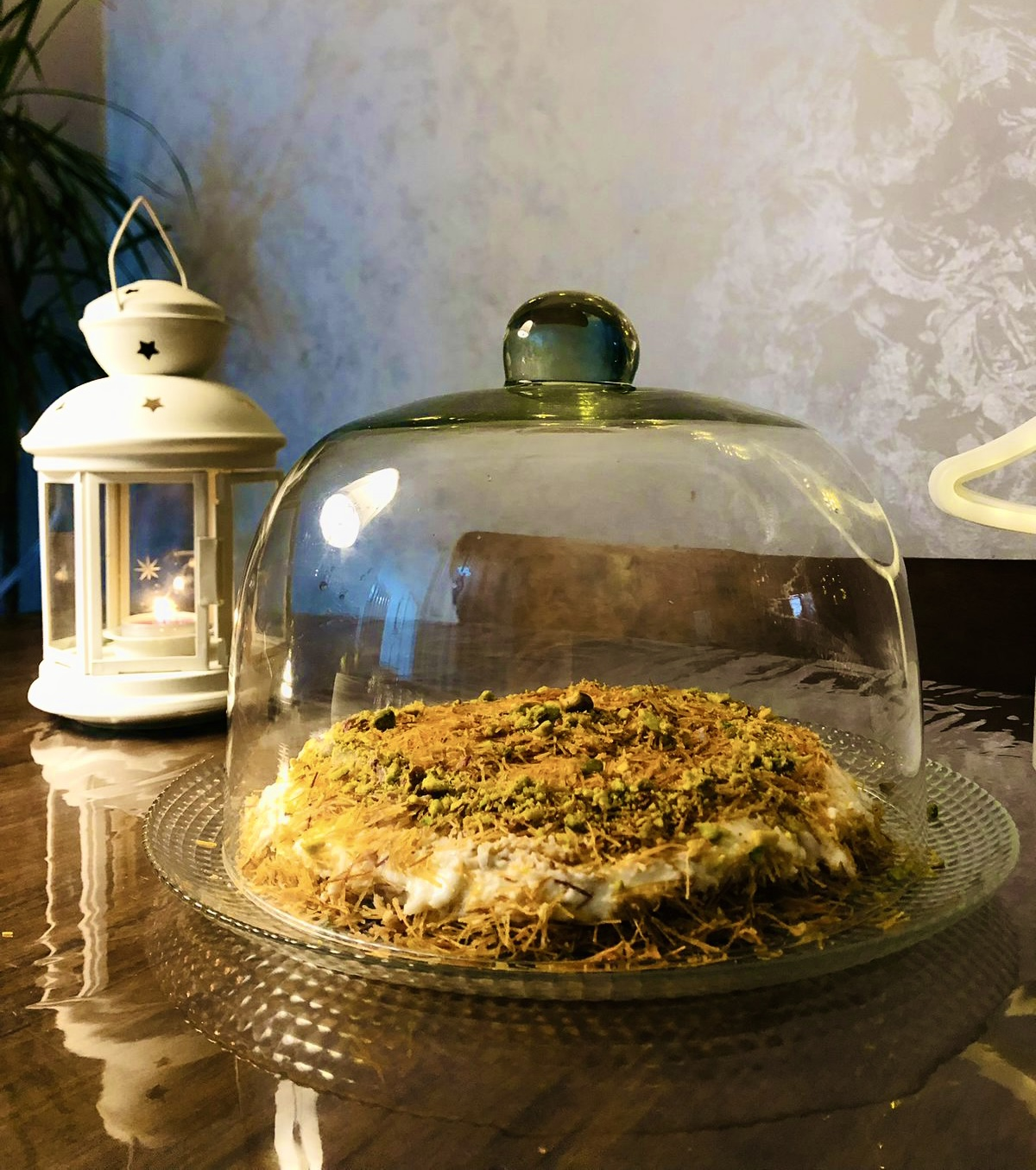
Othmalliyya

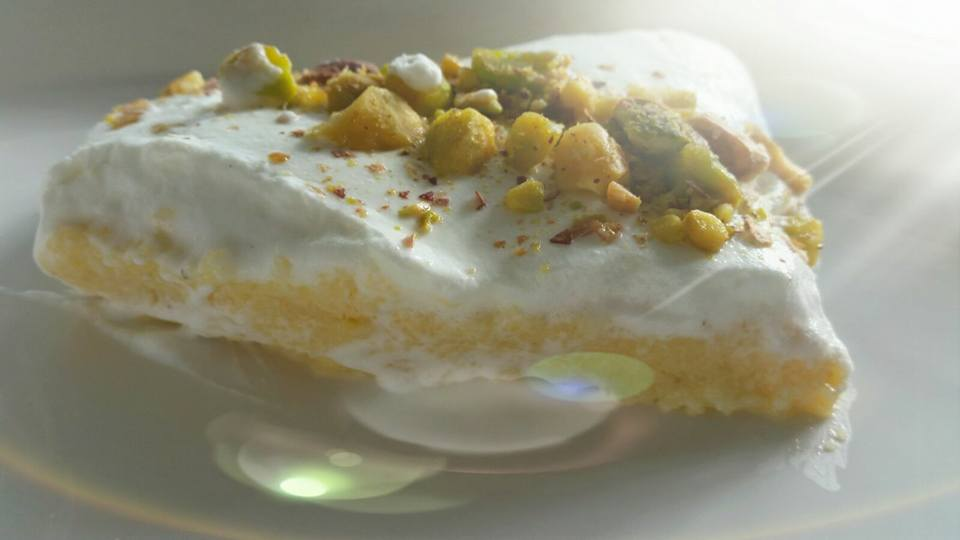
Layali lubnan, also called qashtalia

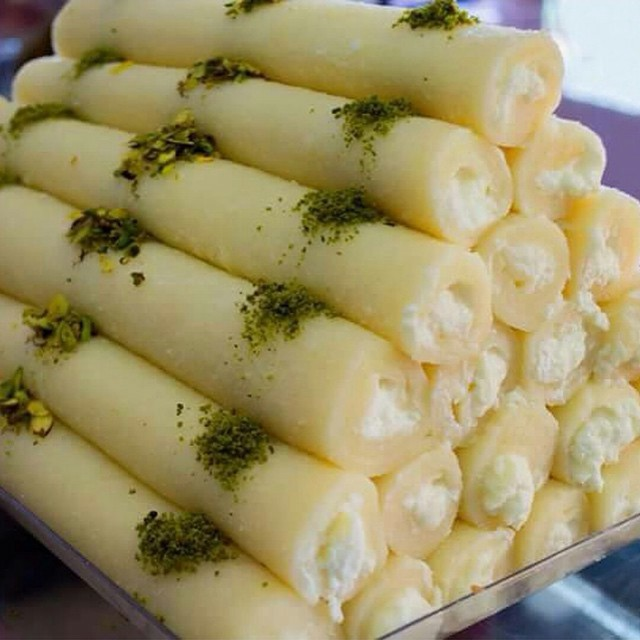
Halawet el Jibn

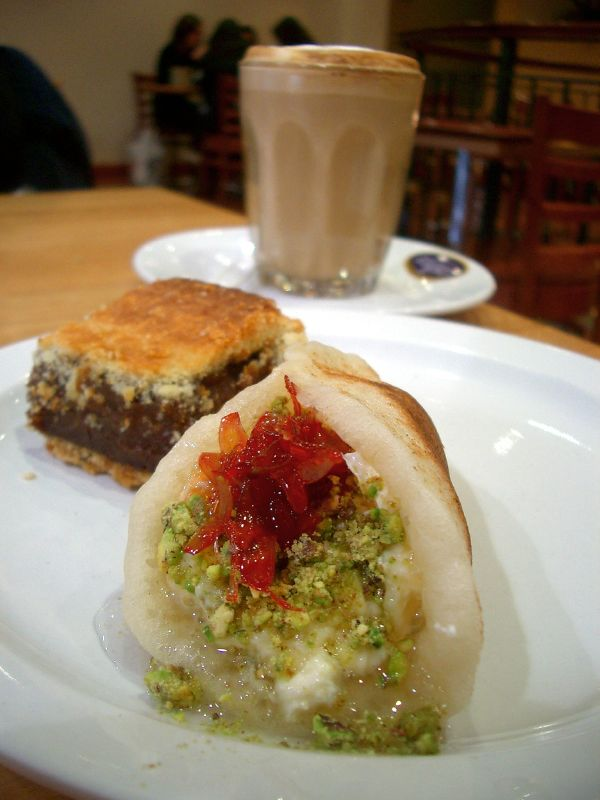
Atayef asafiri with ashta (front) and ma'amoul

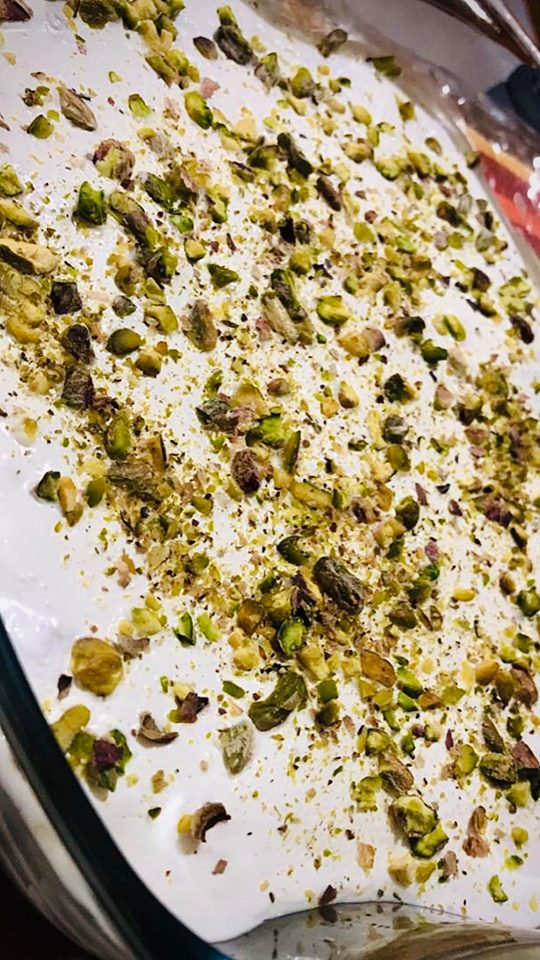
Aish as-Saraya

== See also ==
- Clotted cream
- Malai
- List of cheeses
- List of dairy products
