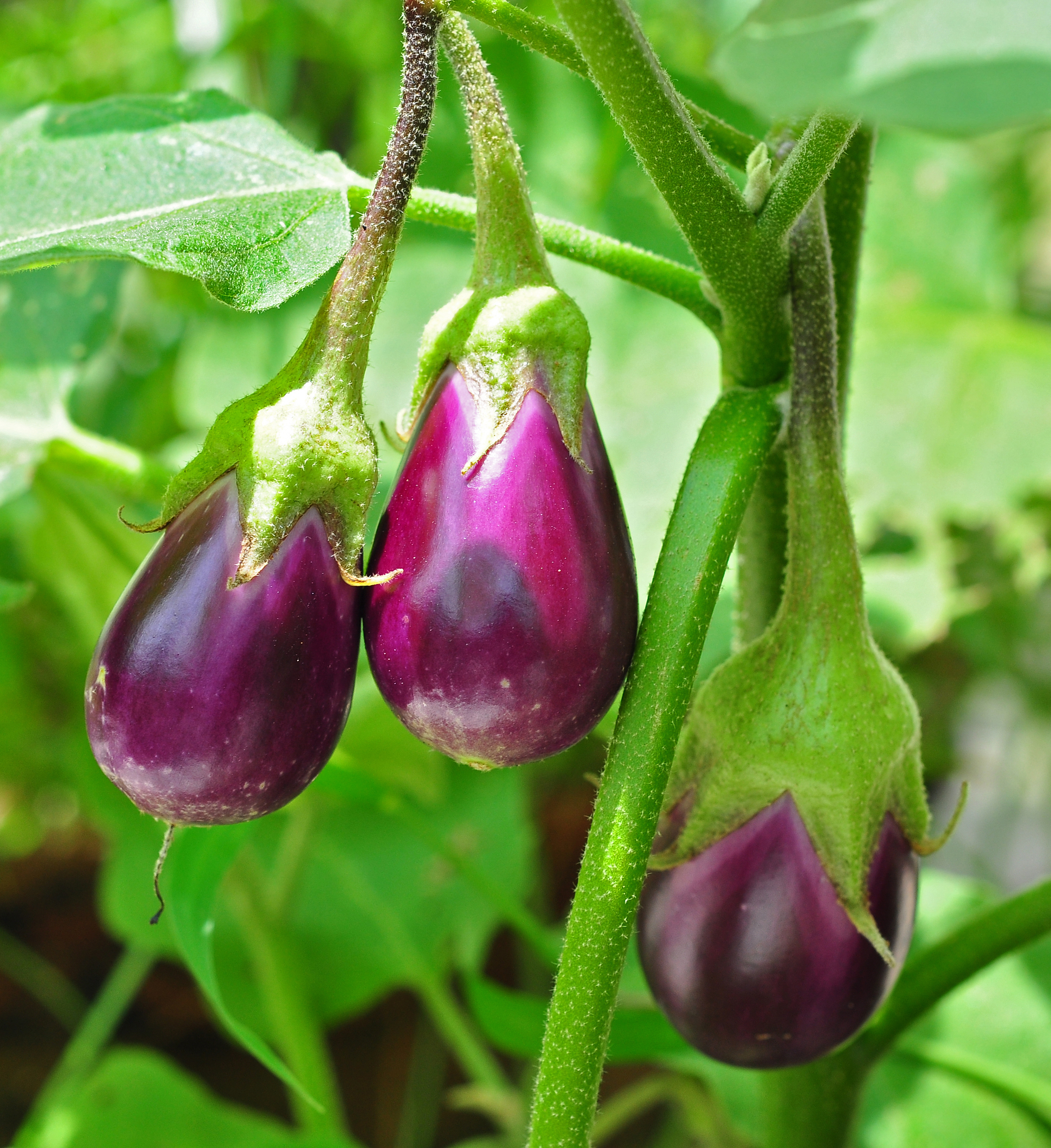
- Fruits growing on the plant

Scientific classification
- Kingdom: Plantae
- Clade: Tracheophytes
- Clade: Angiosperms
- Clade: Eudicots
- Clade: Asterids
- Order: Solanales
- Family: Solanaceae
- Genus: Solanum
- Subgenus: Solanum subg. Leptostemonum
- Section: Solanum sect. Melongena
- Species: S. melongena

Binomial name
- Solanum melongena L.

Synonyms
- Solanum ovigerum Dunal; Solanum trongum Poir. and see text

= Eggplant =

Plant species

Solanum melongena is a plant species in the nightshade family Solanaceae, grown worldwide for its edible fruit, typically used as a vegetable in cooking. It is known by a number of names, including eggplant, aubergine, and brinjal.

Most commonly purple, the spongy, absorbent fruit is used in several cuisines. It is a berry by botanical definition. As a member of the genus Solanum, it is related to the tomato, chili pepper, and potato, although those are of the Americas region while the eggplant is of the Eurasia region. Like the tomato, its skin and seeds can be eaten, but it is usually eaten cooked. Eggplant is nutritionally low in macronutrient and micronutrient content, but the capability of the fruit to absorb oils and flavors into its flesh through cooking expands its use in the culinary arts.

It was originally domesticated from the wild nightshade species thorn or bitter apple, S. incanum, probably with two independent domestications: one in South Asia, and one in East Asia. In 2023, world production of eggplants was 61 million tonnes (130 billion pounds), with China and India combining for 85% of the total.

== Description ==
The eggplant is a delicate, tropical perennial plant often cultivated as a tender or half-hardy annual in temperate climates. The stem is often spiny. It grows 40 to 150 cm (1 ft 4 in to 4 ft 11 in) tall, with large, coarsely lobed leaves that are 10 to 20 cm (4 to 8 in) long and 5 to 10 cm (2 to 4 in) broad. Semiwild types can grow much larger, to 225 cm (7 ft 5 in), with large leaves over 30 cm (12 in) long and 15 cm (6 in) broad.

The flowers are white to purple in color, with a five-lobed corolla and yellow stamens.

Botanically classified as a berry, the fruit contains numerous small, soft, edible seeds that taste bitter because they contain or are covered in nicotinoid alkaloids, like the related tobacco. Some common cultivars have fruit that is egg-shaped, glossy, and purple with white flesh and a spongy, "meaty" texture. Some other cultivars are white and longer in shape. Wild eggplant fruits measure less than 3 cm (1 1/4 in) in diameter. The fruit flesh rapidly turns brown when in contact with the oxygen in the air.

=== Genetics ===
The eggplant genome has 12 chromosomes.

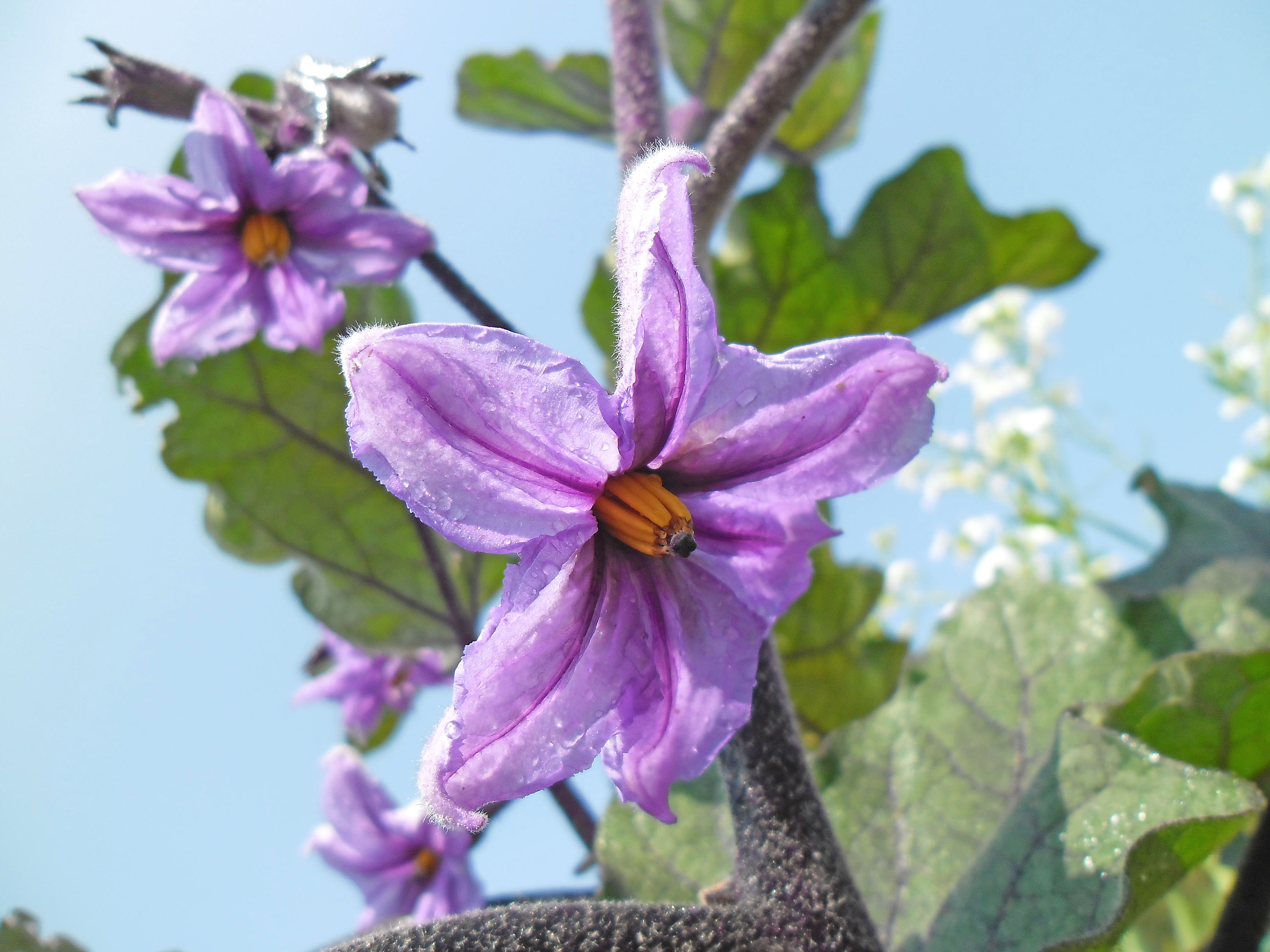
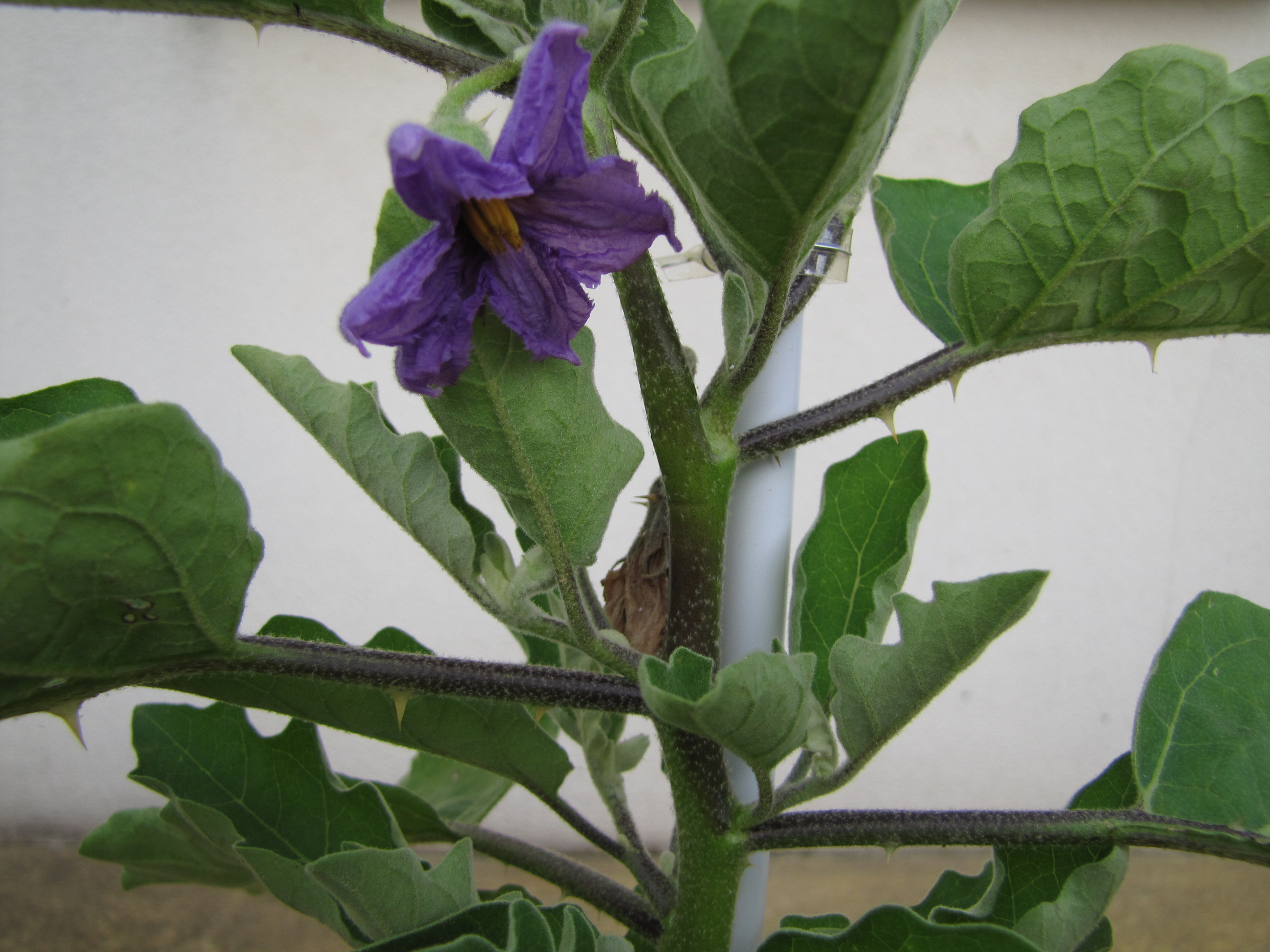
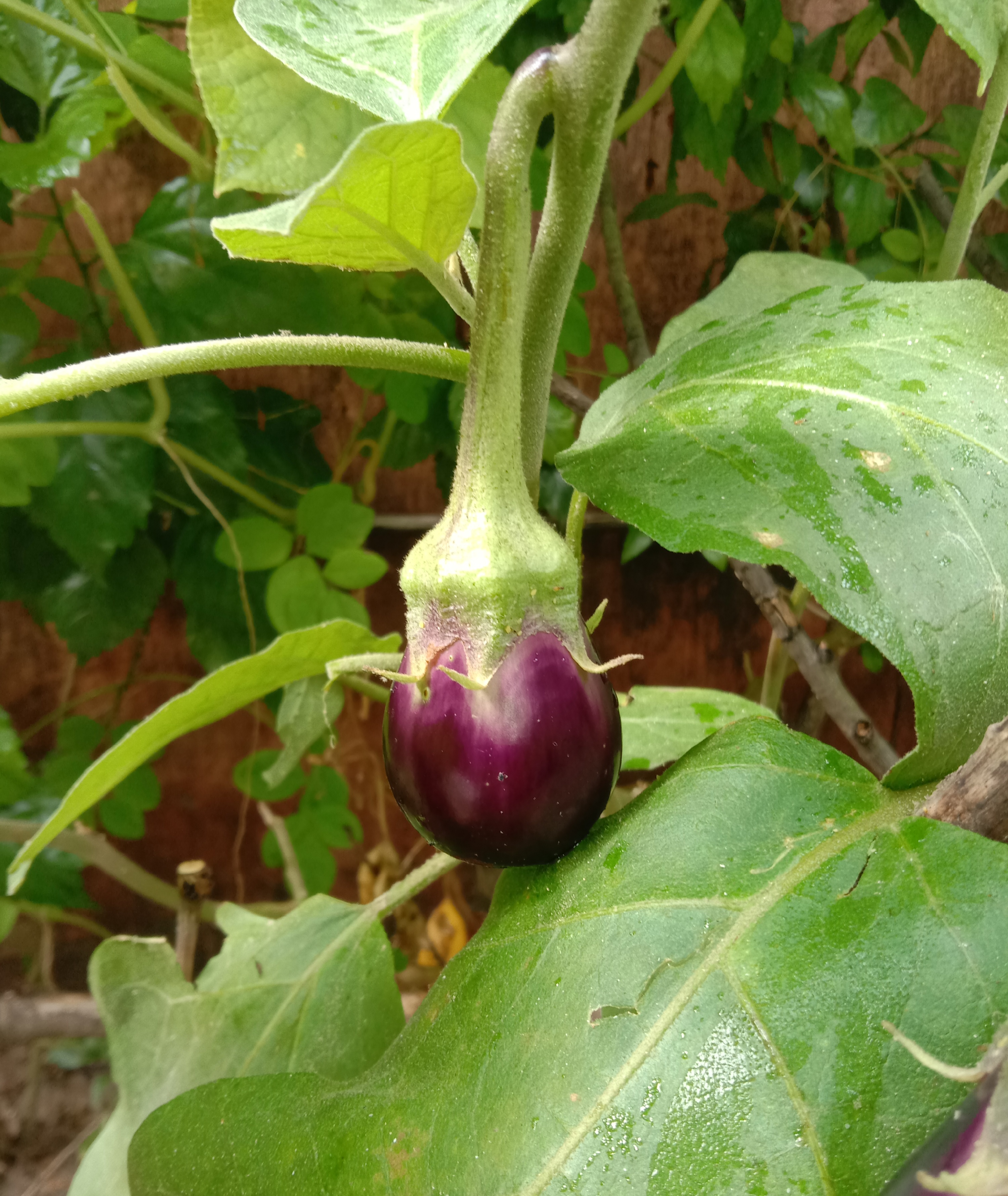
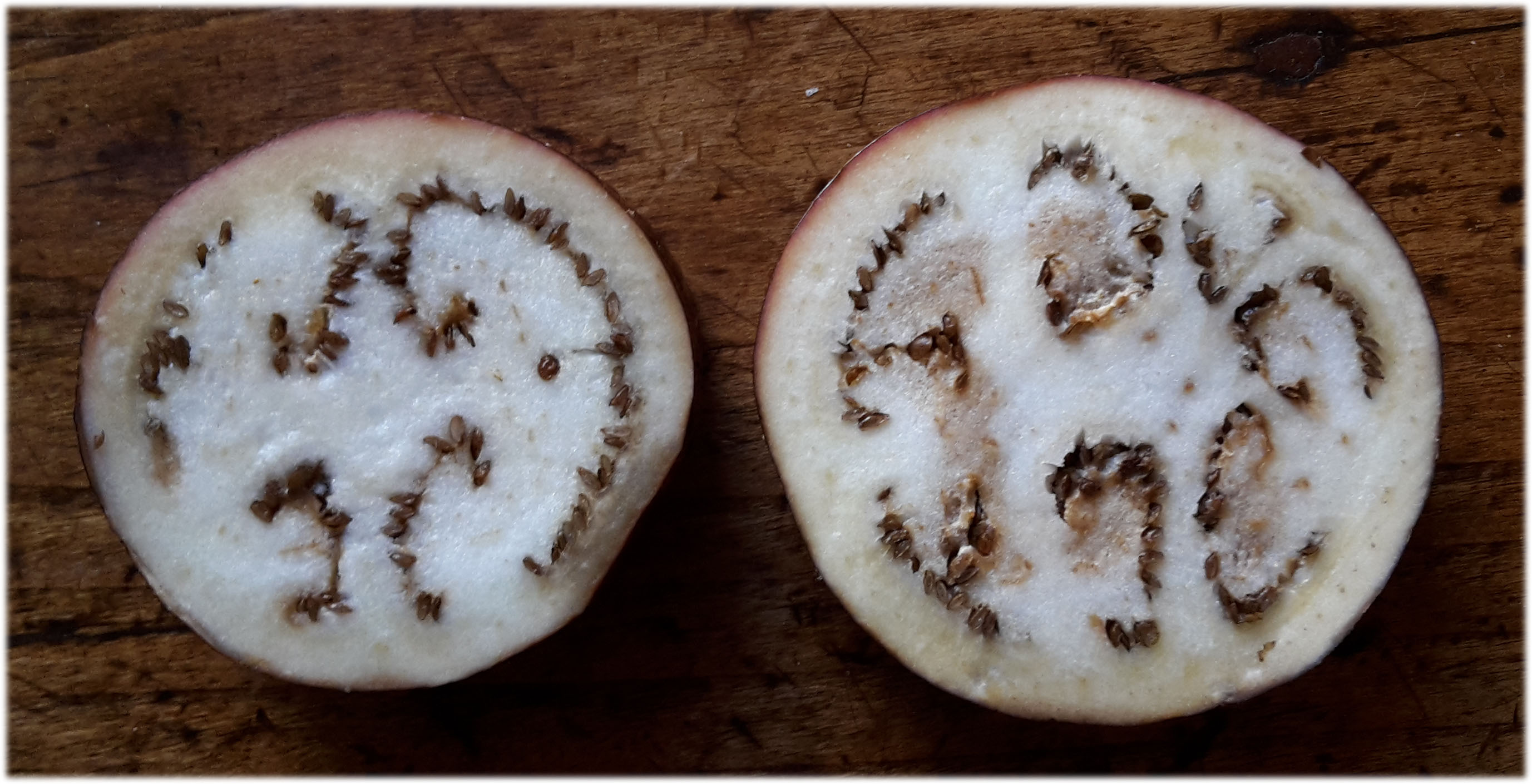
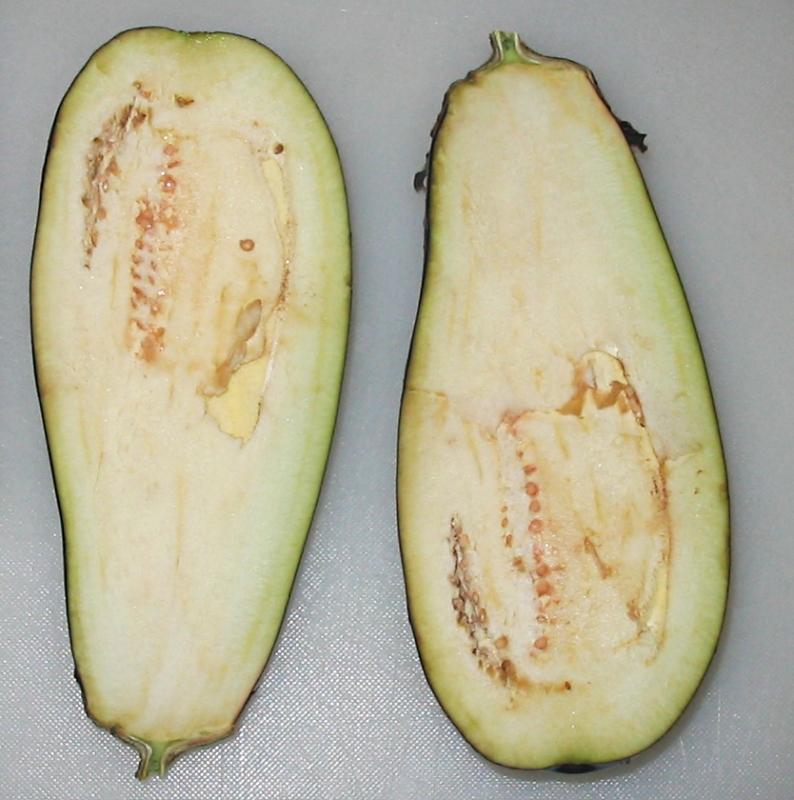
Left to right: a) Closeup of eggplant flower; b) Thorns and leaves of the plant; c) A developing fruit; d) Transversal section of the fruit showcasing the arrangement of seeds; e) Longitudinal section of eggplant. There are almost no seeds at the top but they become plentiful at the bottom. Although the photograph was taken just a few moments after slicing, the flesh of the eggplant has already begun to oxidize.

== Etymology and regional names ==
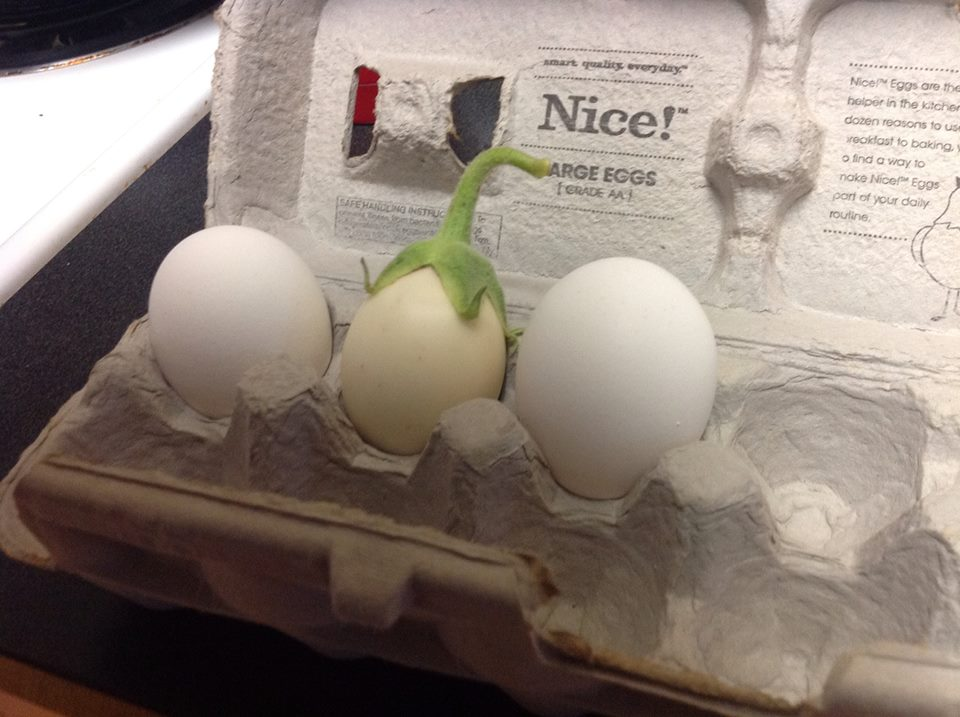
White eggplant compared to two chicken eggs

The plant and fruit have a profusion of English names.

=== Eggplant-type names ===
The name eggplant is usual in North American English, Australian English, and Philippine English. First recorded in 1763, the word "eggplant" was originally applied to white cultivars, which look very much like hen's eggs (see image). Similar names are widespread in other languages, such as the Icelandic term eggaldin or the Welsh planhigyn ŵy.

The white, egg-shaped varieties of the eggplant's fruits are also known as garden eggs, a term first attested in 1811. The Oxford English Dictionary records that between 1797 and 1888, the name vegetable egg was also used.

=== Aubergine-type names ===
Whereas eggplant was coined in some variations of English, any other European names for the plant derive from the Arabic باذنجان (romanized bāḏinjān, pronounced [bæːðɪnˈd͡ʒæːn]). Bāḏinjān is itself a loan-word in Arabic, whose earliest traceable origins lie in the Dravidian languages. The Hobson-Jobson dictionary comments that "probably there is no word of the kind which has undergone such extraordinary variety of modifications, whilst retaining the same meaning, as this".

In English usage, modern names deriving from Arabic bāḏinjān include:

- Aubergine, usual in British English, Irish English, and New Zealand English (as well as German, French and Dutch)
- Brinjal or brinjaul, usual in Indian English and South African English, as well as Pakistani, Bangladeshi, Sri Lankan, Singaporean, and Malaysian English
- Solanum melongena, the Linnaean name
- Caribbean English baigan or melongene

==== From Dravidian to Arabic ====
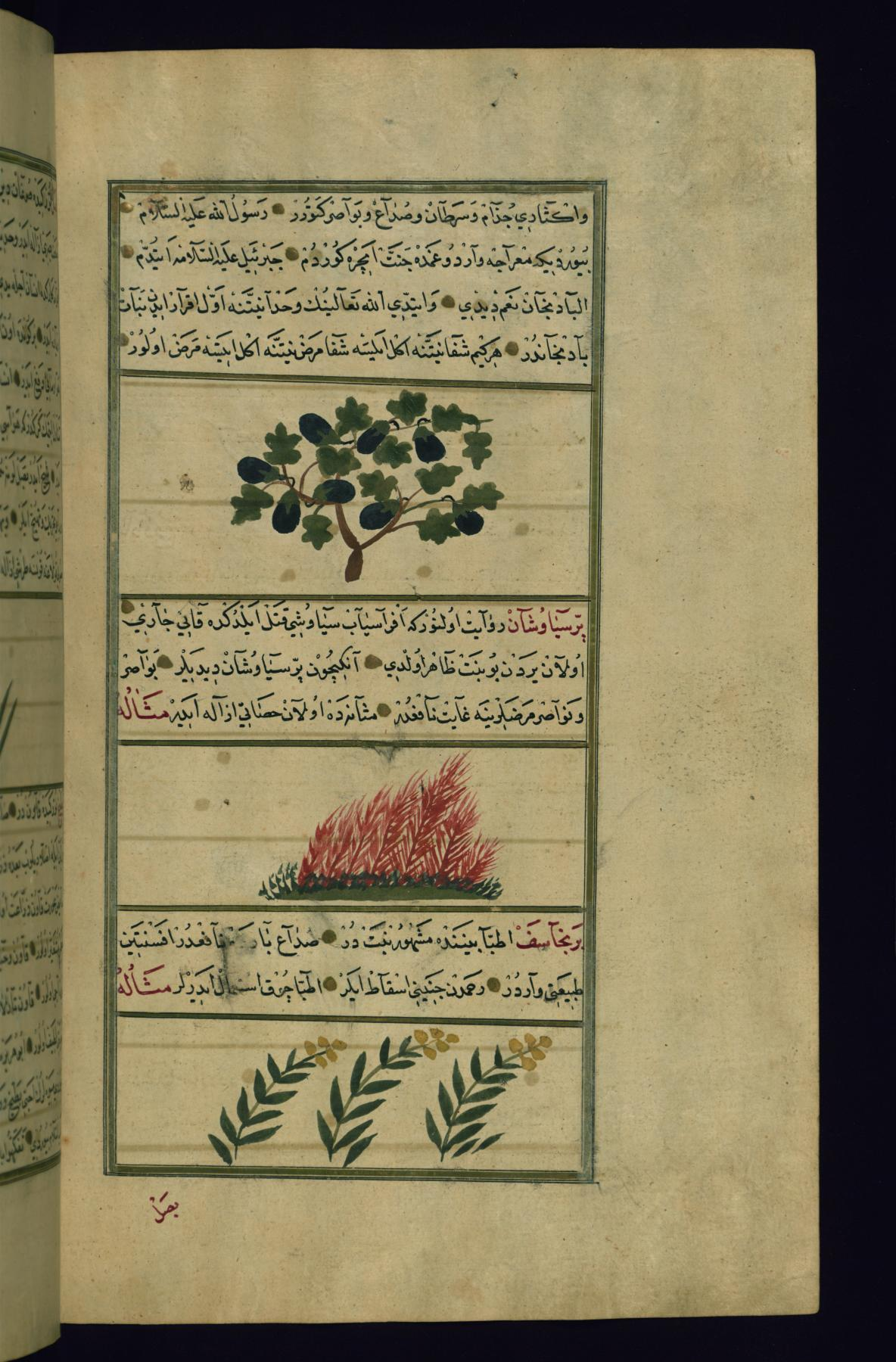
Illustration of an eggplant (upper picture) in a 1717 manuscript of a work by the thirteenth-century Persian Zakariya al-Qazwini

All the aubergine-type names have the same origin, in the Dravidian languages. Modern descendants of this ancient Dravidian word include Malayalam vaṟutina and Tamil vaṟutuṇai.

The Dravidian word was borrowed into the Indo-Aryan languages, giving ancient forms such as Sanskrit and Pali vātiṅ-gaṇa (alongside Sanskrit vātigama) and Prakrit vāiṃaṇa. According to the entry brinjal in the Oxford English Dictionary, the Sanskrit word vātin-gāna denoted 'the class (that removes) the wind-disorder (windy humour)': that is, it came to be the name for eggplants because they were thought to cure flatulence. The modern Hindustani word descending directly from the Sanskrit name is baingan.

The Indic word vātiṅ-gaṇa was then borrowed into Persian as bādingān, which was borrowed in turn into Arabic as bāḏinjān (or, with the definite article, al-bāḏinjān). From Arabic, the word was borrowed into European languages.

==== From Arabic into Iberia and beyond ====
In al-Andalus, the Arabic word (al-)bāḏinjān was borrowed into the Romance languages in forms beginning with b- or, with the definite article included, alb-:

- Portuguese bringella, bringiela, beringela
- Spanish berenjena, alberenjena

The Spanish word alberenjena was then borrowed into French, giving aubergine (along with French dialectal forms like albergine, albergaine, albergame, and belingèle). The French name was then borrowed into British English, appearing there first in the late eighteenth century.

Through the colonial expansion of Portugal, the Portuguese form bringella was borrowed into a variety of other languages:

- Indian, Malaysian, Singaporean and South African English brinjal, brinjaul (first attested in the seventeenth century)
- West Indian English brinjalle and (through folk-etymology) brown-jolly
- French bringelle in La Réunion

Thus although Indian English brinjal ultimately originates in languages of the Indian subcontinent, it actually came into Indian English via Portuguese.

==== From Arabic into Greek and beyond ====
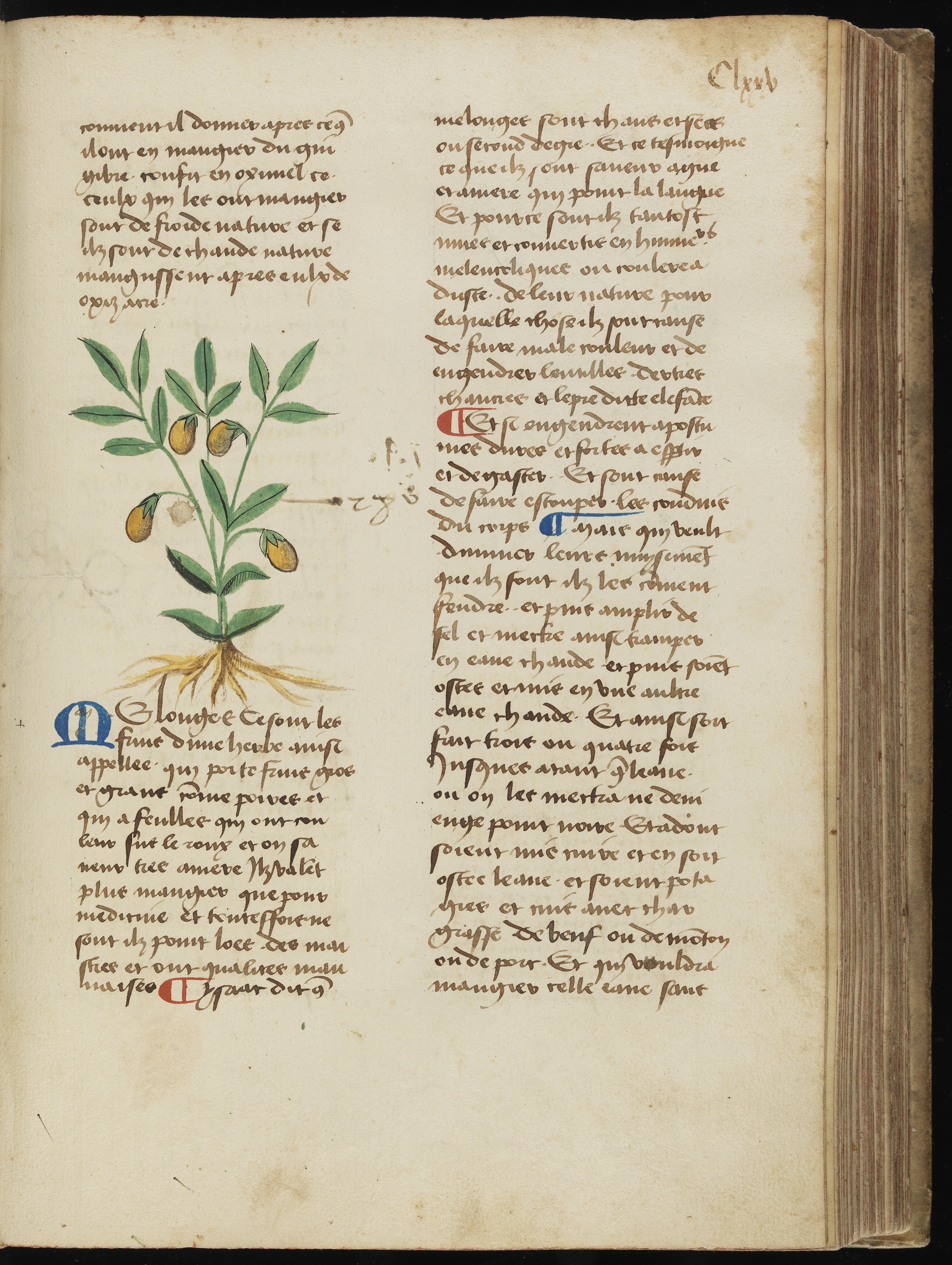
Illustrations of an eggplant from a possibly fifteenth-century French manuscript of a work by Matthaeus Platearius. The word melonge, below the illustration, has a blue initial M-.

The Arabic word bāḏinjān was borrowed into Greek by the eleventh century CE. The Greek loans took a variety of forms, but crucially they began with m-, partly because Greek lacked the initial b- sound and partly through folk-etymological association with the Greek word μέλας (mélas), 'black'. Attested Greek forms include ματιζάνιον (matizánion, eleventh-century), μελιντζάνα (melintzána, fourteenth-century), and μελιντζάνιον (melintzánion, seventeenth-century).

From Greek, the word was borrowed into Italian and medieval Latin, and onwards into French. Early forms include:

- Melanzāna, recorded in Sicilian in the twelfth century
- Melongena, recorded in Latin in the thirteenth century
- Melongiana, recorded in Veronese in the fourteenth century
- Melanjan, recorded in Old French

From these forms came the botanical Latin melongēna. This was used by Tournefort as a genus name in 1700, then by Linnaeus as a species name in 1753. It remains in scientific use.

These forms also gave rise to the Caribbean English melongene.

The Italian melanzana, through folk-etymology, was adapted to mela insana ('mad apple'): already by the thirteenth century, this name had given rise to a tradition that eggplants could cause insanity. Translated into English as 'mad-apple', 'rage-apple', or 'raging apple', this name for eggplants is attested from 1578 and the form 'mad-apple' may still be found in Southern American English.

=== Other English names ===
The plant is also known as guinea squash in Southern American English. The term guinea in the name originally denoted the fact that the fruits were associated with West Africa, specifically the region that is now the modern day country Guinea.

It has been known as Jew's apple, apparently in relation to a belief that the fruit was first imported to the West Indies by Jewish people.

== History ==
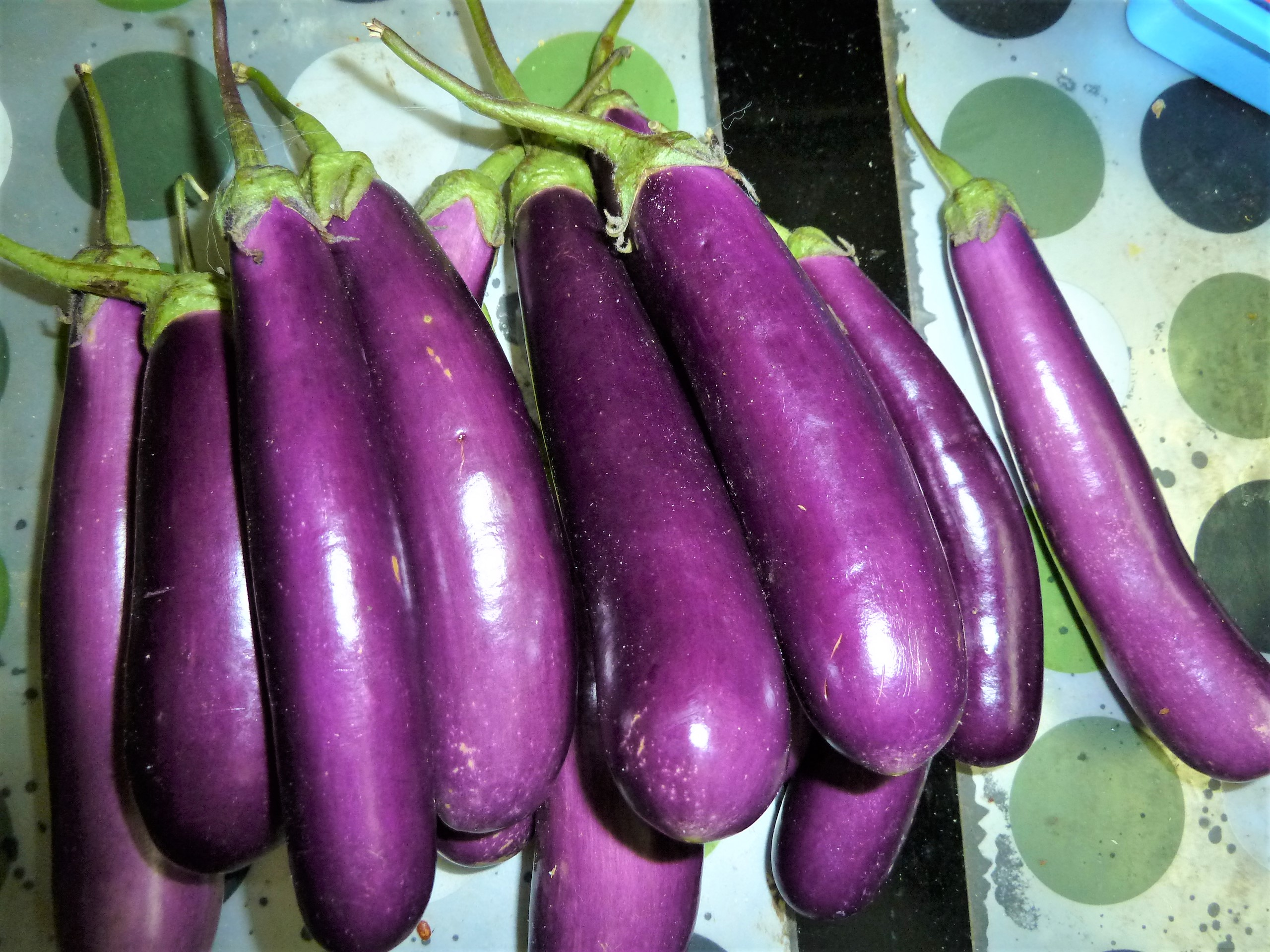
Long purple eggplants

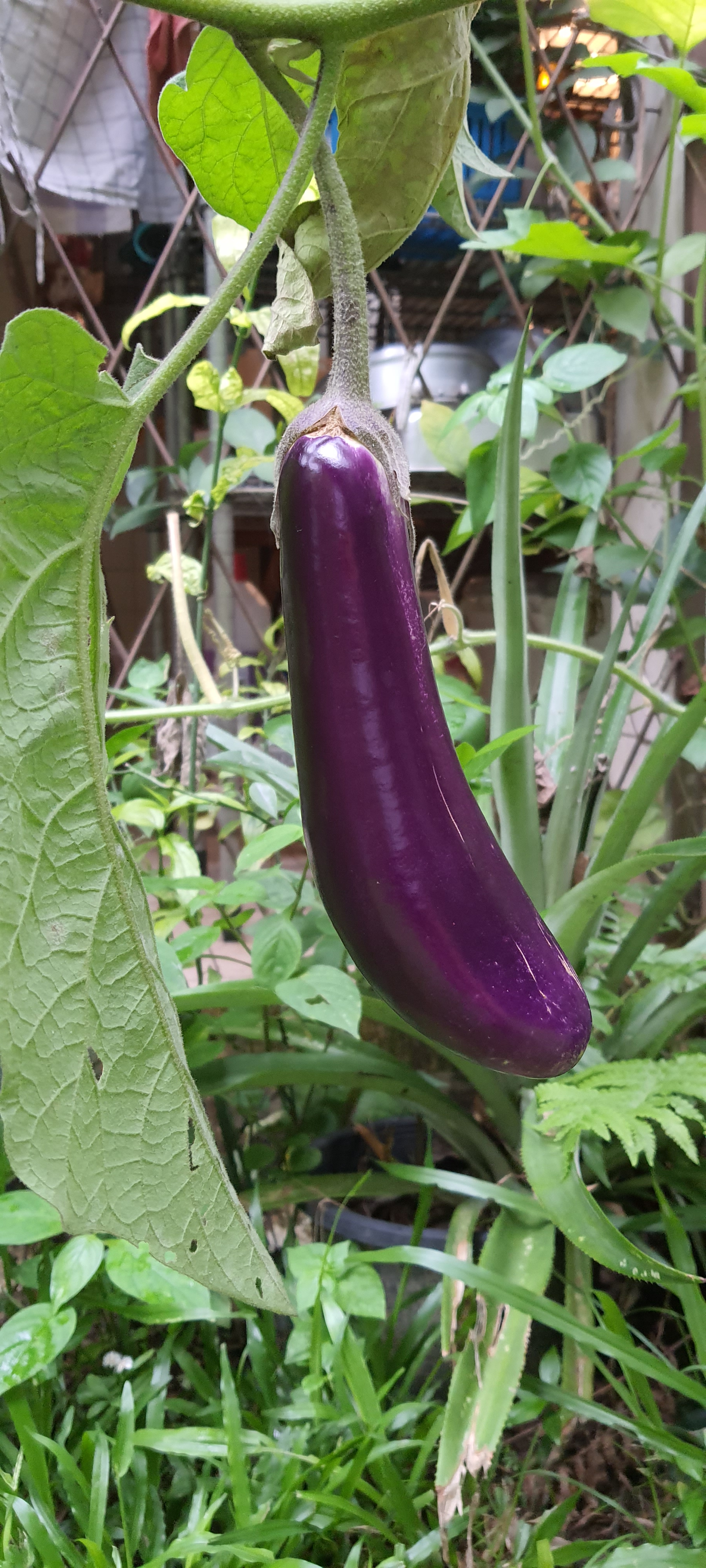
Purple eggplant, ready for harvesting.

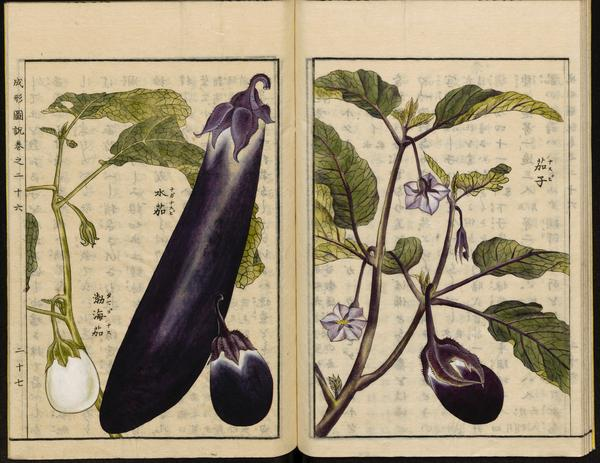
Varieties of Solanum melongena from the Japanese Seikei Zusetsu agricultural encyclopedia

There is no consensus about the place of origin of eggplant; the plant species has been described as native to South Asia, where it continues to grow wild, or Africa. It has been cultivated in southern and eastern Asia since prehistory. The earliest known mention of the eggplant is in the 59 BCE "Slave's Contract" (僮約; tóng yuē) by Chinese poet Wang Bao (王褒); subsequently, the plant was mentioned in other later sources such as Qimin Yaoshu, an agricultural treatise completed in 544 CE. It appears to have been unknown in ancient Greek and Roman cuisines. The presence of numerous Arabic and North African names for the vegetable suggests that it was cultivated in the Mediterranean area by Arabs during the early Middle Ages.

Eggplant arrived in Muslim Spain in the 8th century. A book on agriculture by Ibn Al-Awwam in 12th-century Muslim Spain described how to grow aubergines. Records exist from later medieval Catalan and Spanish, as well as from 14th-century Italy.

Eggplant was present in Muslim Sicily in the 10th century.

It was introduced into Byzantine Greek cuisine in the late 11th century.

The eggplant remained unknown in northern Europe until the 17th century. It is unrecorded in England until the 16th century, with an English botany book of 1597 describing the "madde or raging Apple":

This plant groweth in Egypt almost everywhere... bringing foorth fruite of the bignes of a great Cucumber.... We have had the same in our London gardens, where it hath borne flowers, but the winter approching before the time of ripening, it perished: notwithstanding it came to beare fruite of the bignes of a goose egge one extraordinarie temperate yeere... but never to the full ripenesse.

Europeans brought it to the Americas.

Because of the plant's relationship with various other nightshades, the fruit was at one time believed to be extremely poisonous. The flowers and leaves can be poisonous if consumed in large quantities due to the presence of solanine.

The eggplant has a special place in folklore. In 13th-century Italian traditional folklore, the eggplant can cause insanity. In 19th-century Egypt, insanity was said to be "more common and more violent" when the eggplant is in season in the summer.

== Cultivars ==
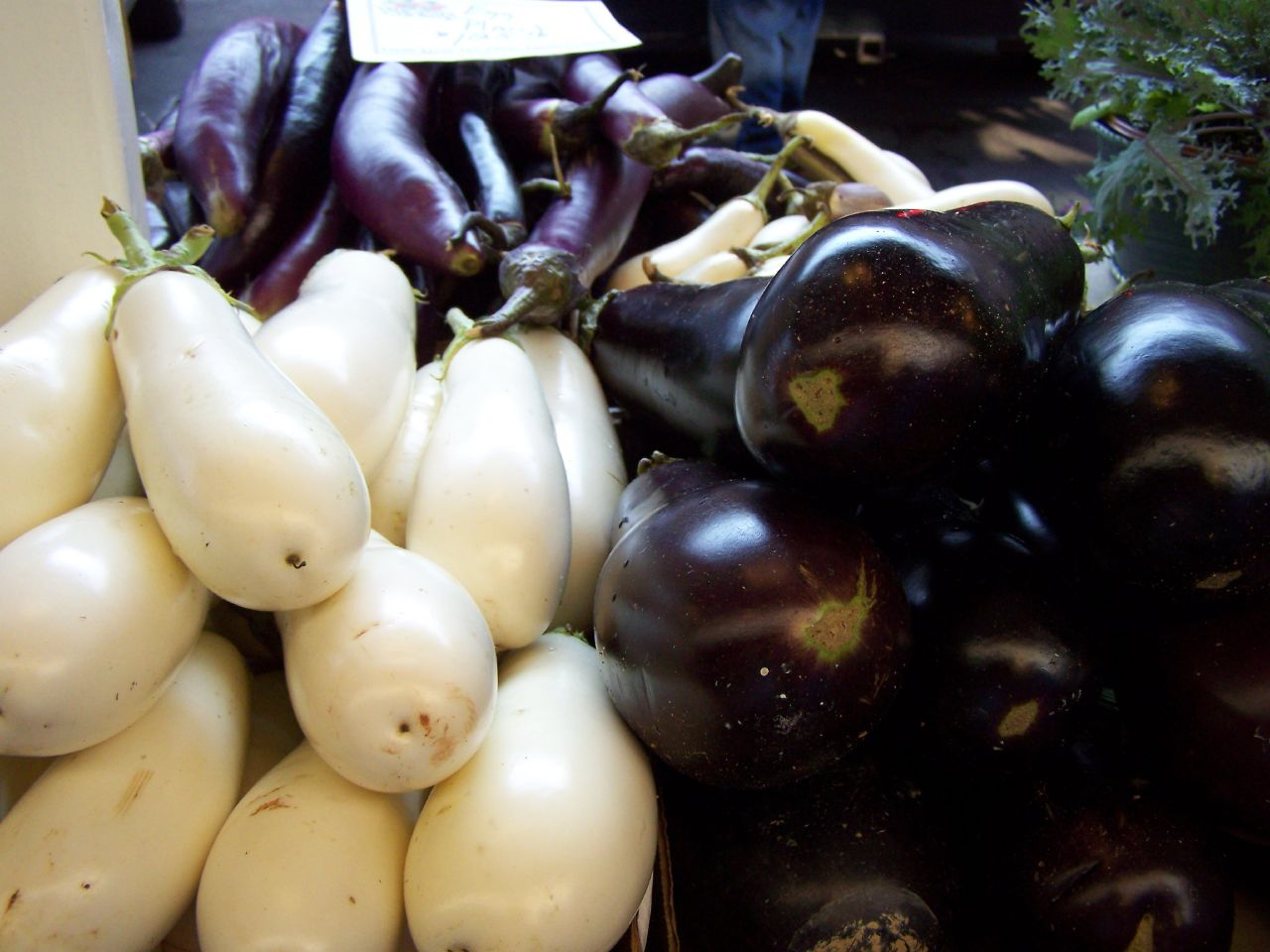
Three cultivars of eggplant, showing size, shape, and color differences

Different cultivars of the plant produce fruit of different size, shape, and color, though typically purple. The less common white varieties of eggplant are also known as Easter white eggplants, garden eggs, Casper or white eggplant. The most widely cultivated varieties—cultivars—in Europe and North America today are elongated ovoid, 12–25 cm (4 1/2–10 in) long and 6–9 cm (2 1/2–3 1/2 in) broad with a dark purple skin.

A much wider range of shapes, sizes, and colors is grown in India and elsewhere in Asia. Larger cultivars weighing up to a kilogram (2.2 pounds) grow in the region between the Ganges and Yamuna Rivers, while smaller ones are found elsewhere. Colors vary from white to yellow or green, as well as reddish-purple and dark purple. Some cultivars have a color gradient—white at the stem, to bright pink, deep purple or even black. Green or purple cultivars with white striping also exist. Chinese cultivars are commonly shaped like a narrower, slightly pendulous cucumber. Also, Asian cultivars of Japanese breeding are grown.

- Oval or elongated oval-shaped and black-skinned cultivars include 'Harris Special Hibush', 'Burpee Hybrid', 'Bringal Bloom', 'Black Magic', 'Classic', 'Dusky', and 'Black Beauty'.
- Slim cultivars in purple-black skin include 'Little Fingers', 'Ichiban', 'Pingtung Long', and 'Tycoon'
  - In green skin, 'Louisiana Long Green' and 'Thai (Long) Green'
  - In white skin, 'Dourga'.
- Traditional, white-skinned, egg-shaped cultivars include 'Casper' and 'Easter Egg'.
- Bicolored cultivars with color gradient include 'Rosa Bianca', 'Violetta di Firenze', 'Bianca Sfumata di Rosa' (heirloom), and 'Prosperosa' (heirloom).
- Bicolored cultivars with striping include 'Listada de Gandia' and 'Udumalapet'.
- In some parts of India, miniature cultivars, most commonly called baigan, are popular.

=== Varieties ===
- S. m. var. esculentum – common aubergine, including white varieties, with many cultivars
- S. m. var. depressum – dwarf aubergine
- S. m. var. serpentium – snake aubergine

==== Genetically engineered eggplant ====
Bt brinjal is a transgenic eggplant that contains a gene from the soil bacterium Bacillus thuringiensis. This variety was designed to give the plant resistance to lepidopteran insects such as the brinjal fruit and shoot borer (Leucinodes orbonalis) and fruit borer (Helicoverpa armigera).

On 9 February 2010, the Environment Ministry of India imposed a moratorium on the cultivation of Bt brinjal after protests against regulatory approval of cultivated Bt brinjal in 2009, stating the moratorium would last "for as long as it is needed to establish public trust and confidence". This decision was deemed controversial, as it deviated from previous practices with other genetically modified crops in India. Bt brinjal was approved for commercial cultivation in Bangladesh in 2013.

== Uses ==
=== Food ===
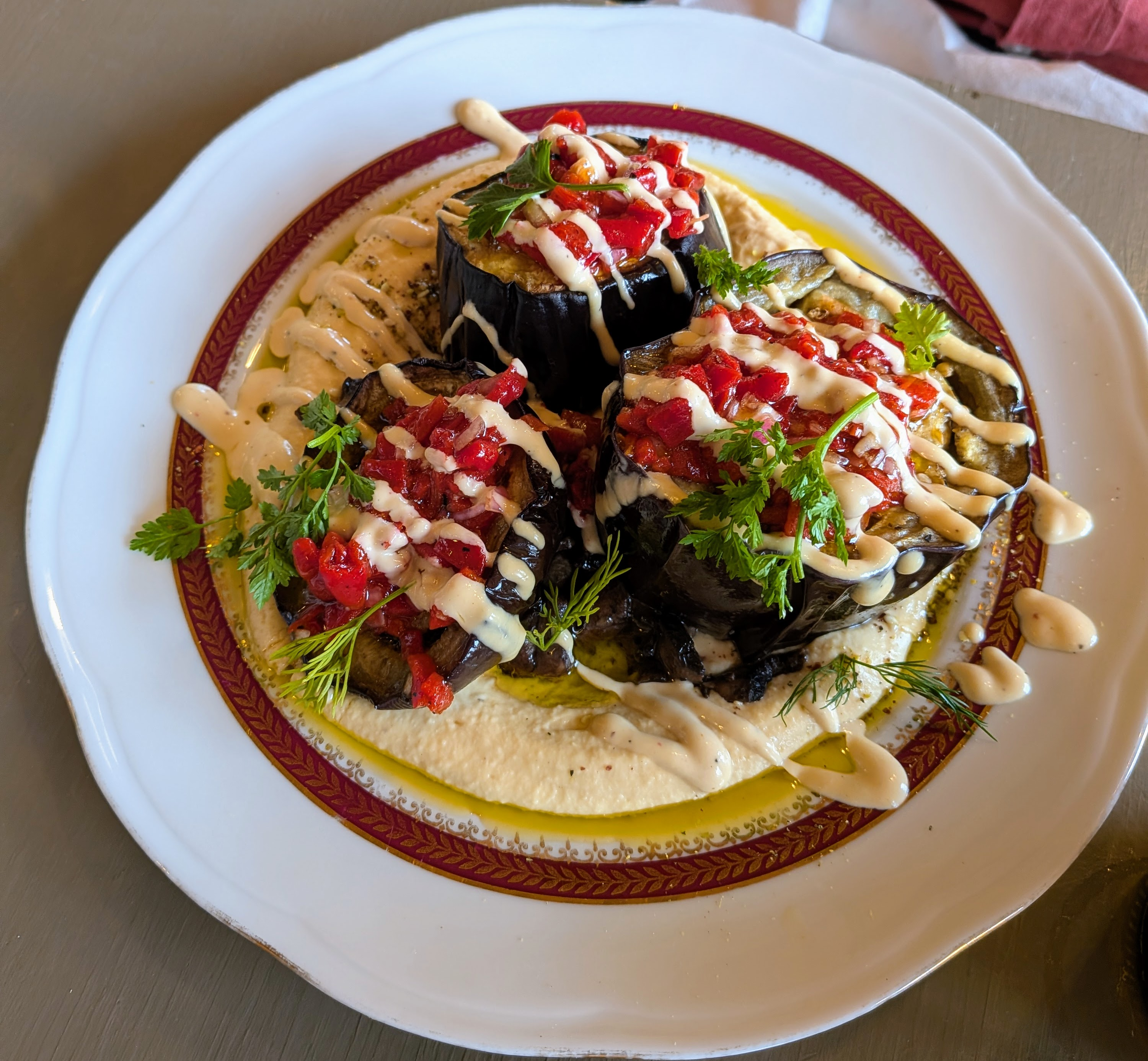
Baked aubergine with grilled red peppers and humus in a Paris bistro

Raw eggplant can have a bitter taste, with an astringent quality, but it becomes tender when cooked and develops a rich, complex flavor. Rinsing, draining, and salting the sliced fruit before cooking may remove the bitterness. The fruit is capable of absorbing cooking fats and sauces, which may enhance the flavor of eggplant dishes.

Eggplant is used in the cuisines of many countries. Due to its texture and bulk, it is sometimes used as a meat substitute in vegan and vegetarian cuisines. Eggplant flesh is smooth. Its numerous seeds are small, soft and edible, along with the rest of the fruit, and do not have to be removed. Its thin skin is also edible, and so it does not have to be peeled. However, the green part at the top, the calyx, does have to be removed when preparing an eggplant for cooking.

Eggplant can be steamed, stir-fried, pan fried, deep fried, barbecued, roasted, stewed, curried, or pickled. Many eggplant dishes are sauces made by mashing the cooked fruit. It can be stuffed. It is frequently, but not always, cooked with oil or fat.

==== East Asia ====
Korean and Japanese eggplant varieties are typically thin-skinned.

In Chinese cuisine, eggplants are known as qiézi (茄子). They are often deep fried and made into dishes such as yúxiāng-qiézi ("fish fragrance eggplant") or di sān xiān ("three earthen treasures"). Elsewhere in China, such as in Yunnan cuisine (in particular the cuisine of the Dai people) they are barbecued or roasted, then split and either eaten directly with garlic, chilli, oil and coriander, or the flesh is removed and pounded to a mash (typically with a wooden pestle and mortar) before being eaten with rice or other dishes.

In Japanese cuisine, eggplants are known as nasu or nasubi and use the same characters as Chinese (茄子). An example of its use is in the dish hasamiyaki (挟み焼き) in which slices of eggplant are grilled and filled with a meat stuffing. Eggplants also feature in several Japanese expression and proverbs, such as "Don't feed autumn eggplant to your wife" (秋茄子は嫁に食わすな, akinasu wa yome ni kuwasuna) (because their lack of seeds will reduce her fertility) and "Always listen to your parents" (親の意見と茄子の花は千に一つも無駄はない, oya no iken to nasu no hana wa sen ni hitotsu mo muda wa nai; literally: "not even one in a thousand of one's parents' opinions or the eggplant flowers is in vain").

In Korean cuisine, eggplants are known as gaji (가지). They are steamed, stir-fried, or pan-fried and eaten as banchan (side dishes), such as namul, bokkeum, and jeon.

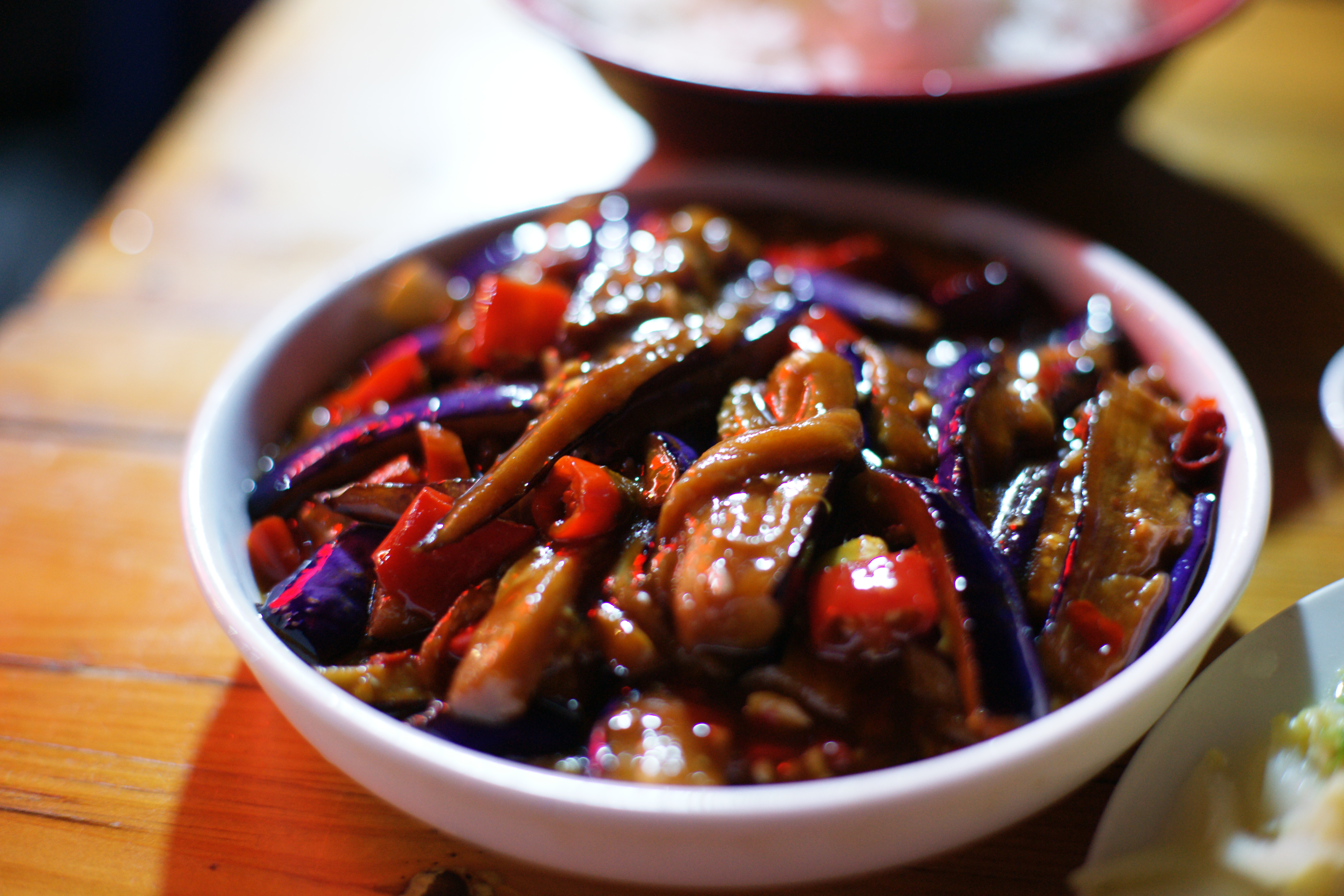
Chinese yúxiāng-qiézi (fish-fragrance eggplants)

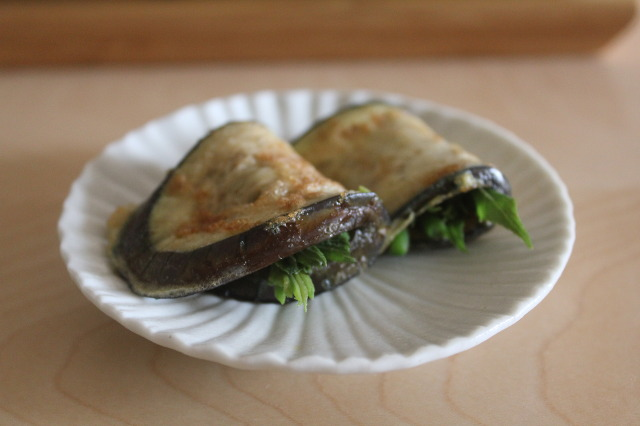
Korean dureup-gaji-jeon (pan-fried eggplants and angelica tree shoots)

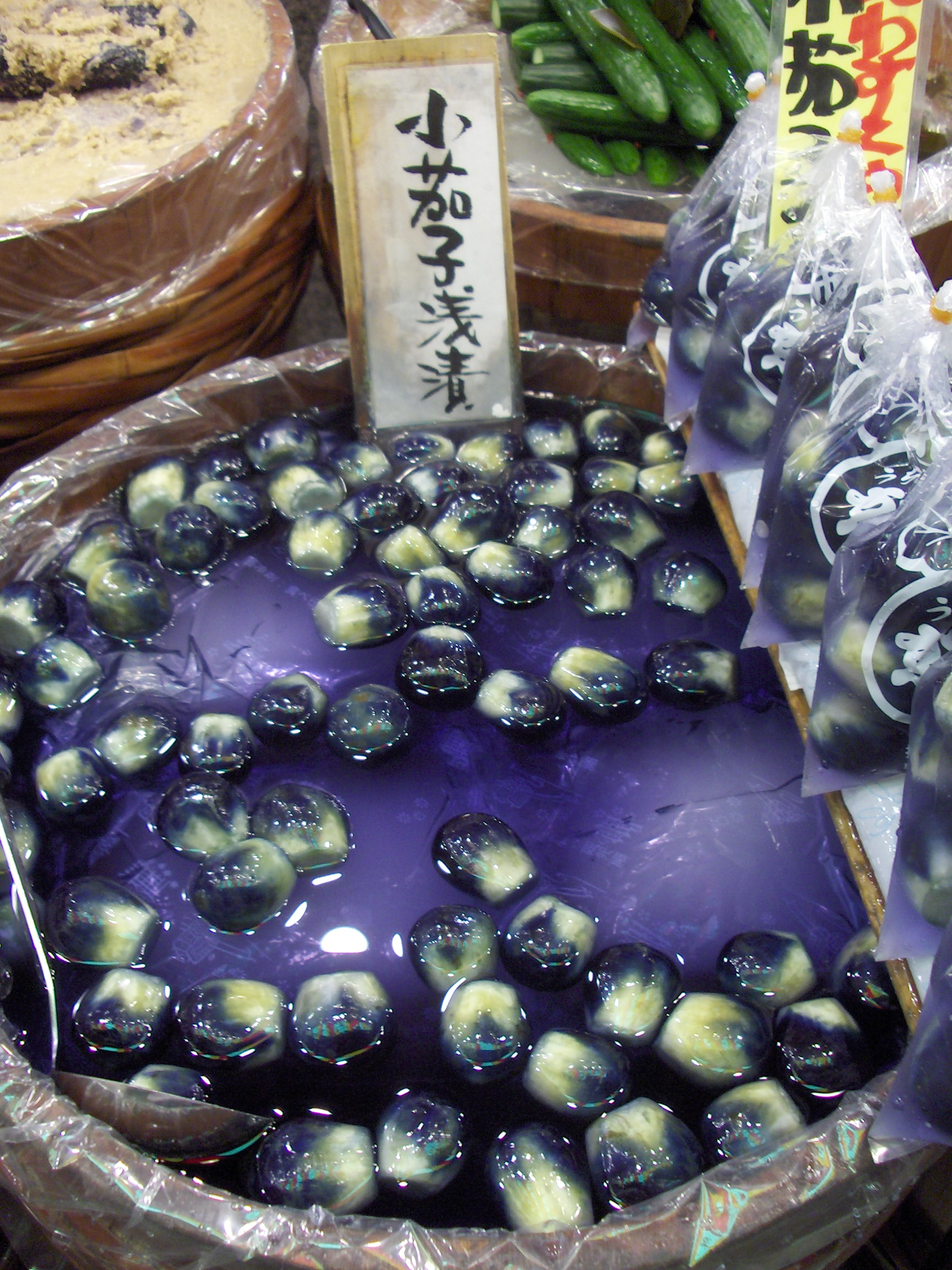
Japanese asazuke pickles with baby eggplants

==== Southeast Asia ====
In the Philippines, eggplants are of the long and slender purple variety. They are known as talong and is widely used in many stew and soup dishes, like pinakbet. However the most popular eggplant dish is tortang talong, an omelette made from grilling an eggplant, dipping it into beaten eggs, and pan-frying the mixture. The dish is characteristically served with the stalk attached. The dish has several variants, including rellenong talong which is stuffed with meat and vegetables. Eggplant can also be grilled, skinned and eaten as a salad called ensaladang talong. Another popular dish is adobong talong, which is diced eggplant prepared with vinegar, soy sauce, and garlic as an adobo.

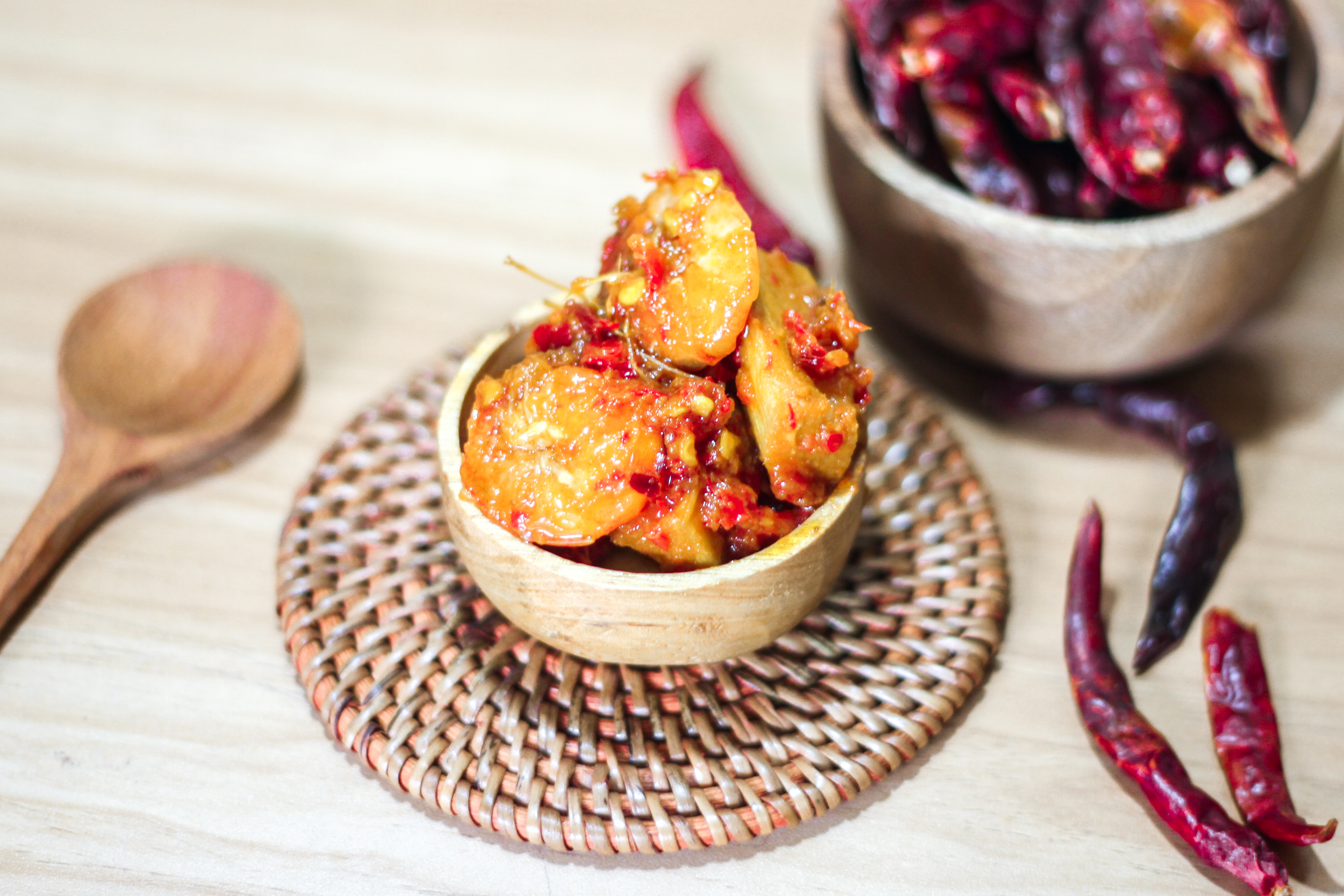
Indonesian chili terong sauce with shrimp

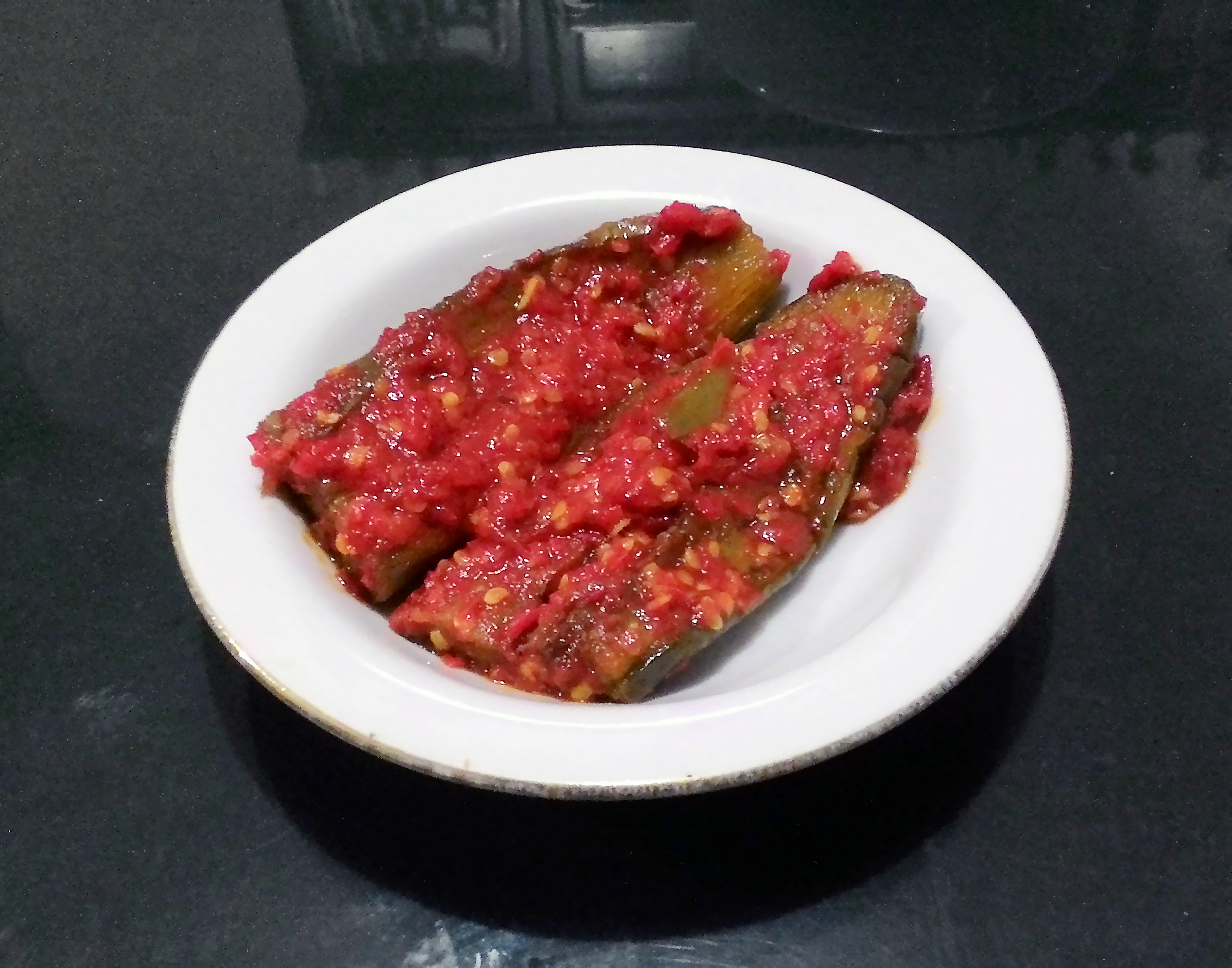
Minang (West Sumatra) balado terong

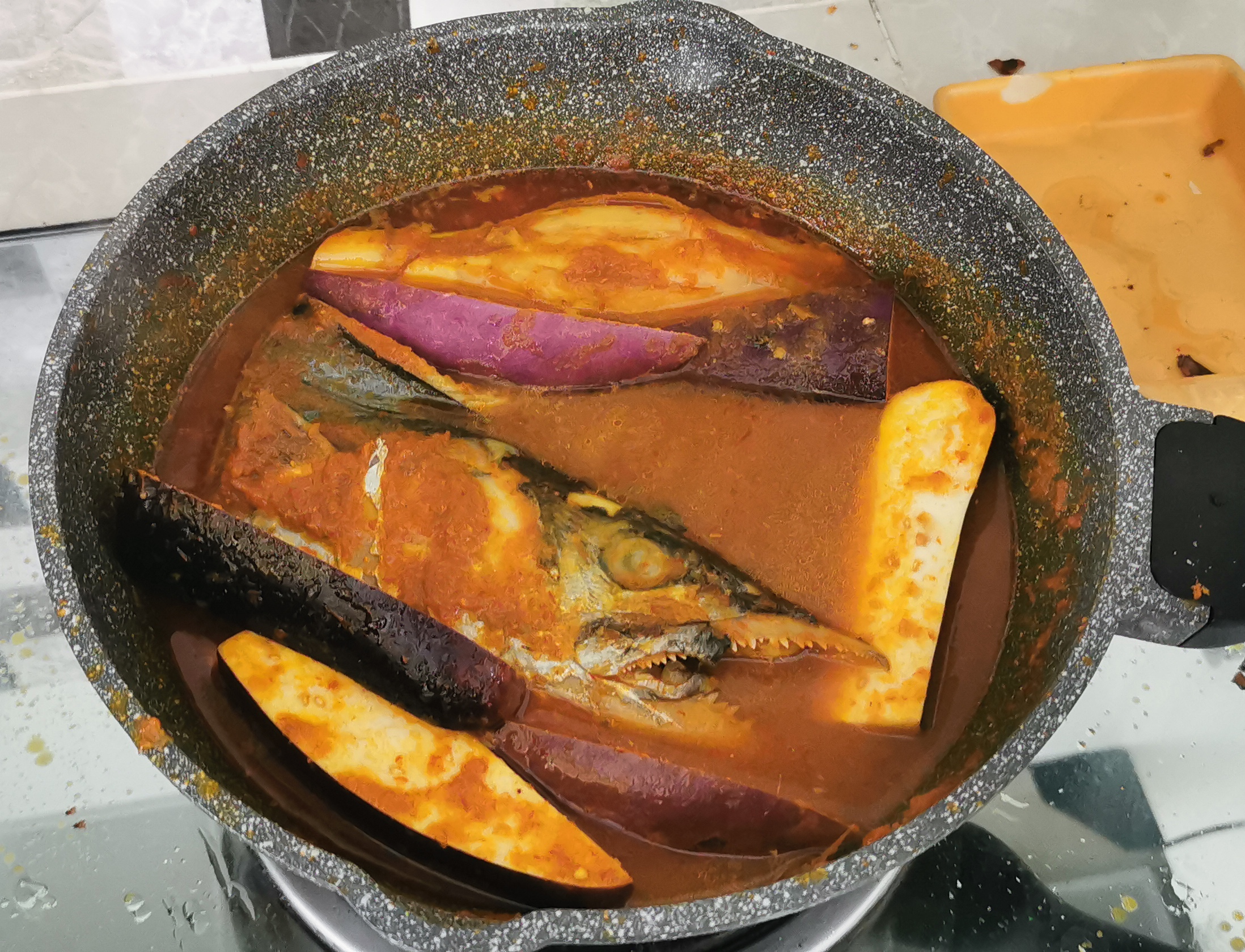
Sweet and sour fish head with terong

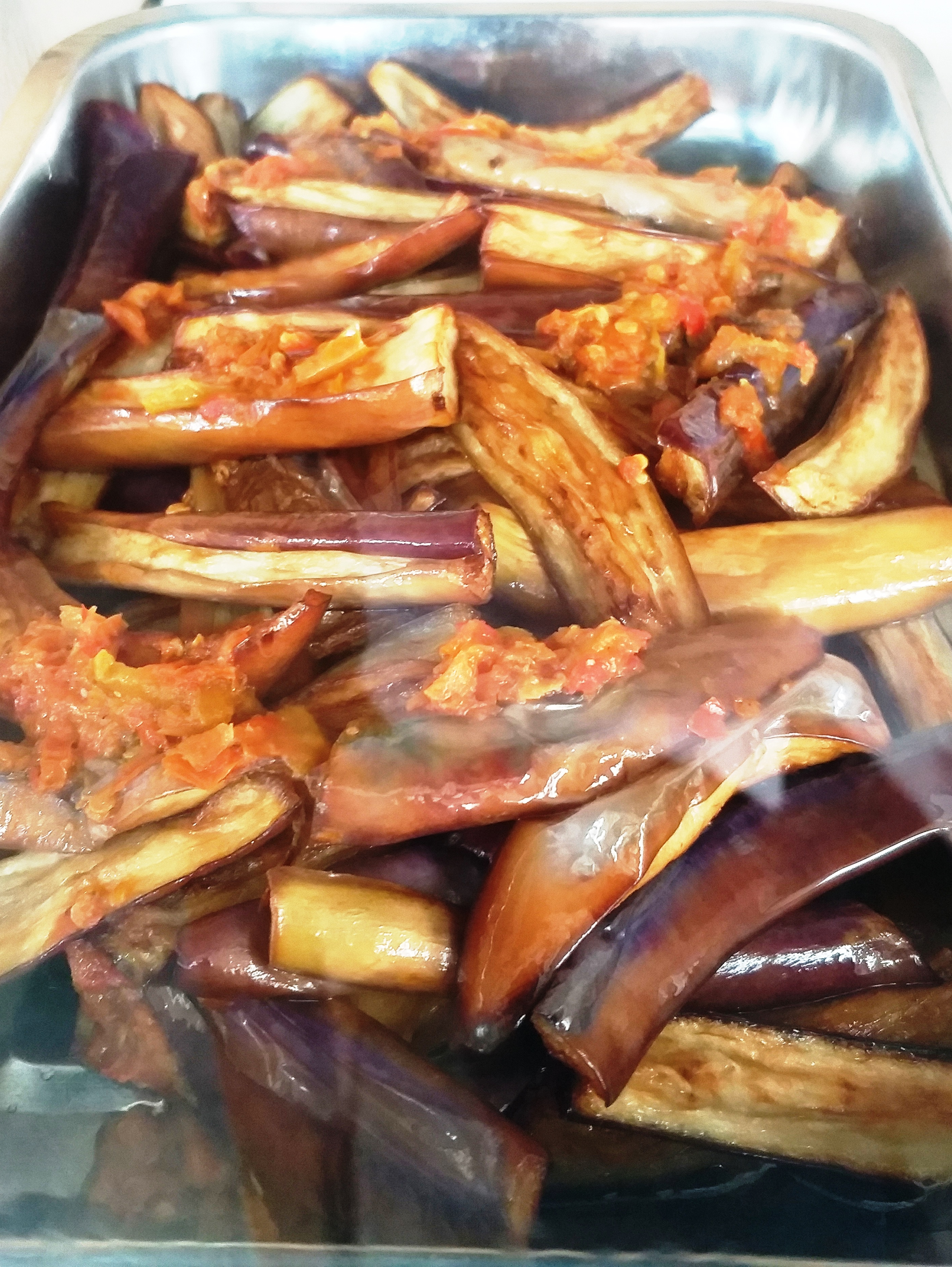
Simple fried terong from Gorontalo (Sulawesi)

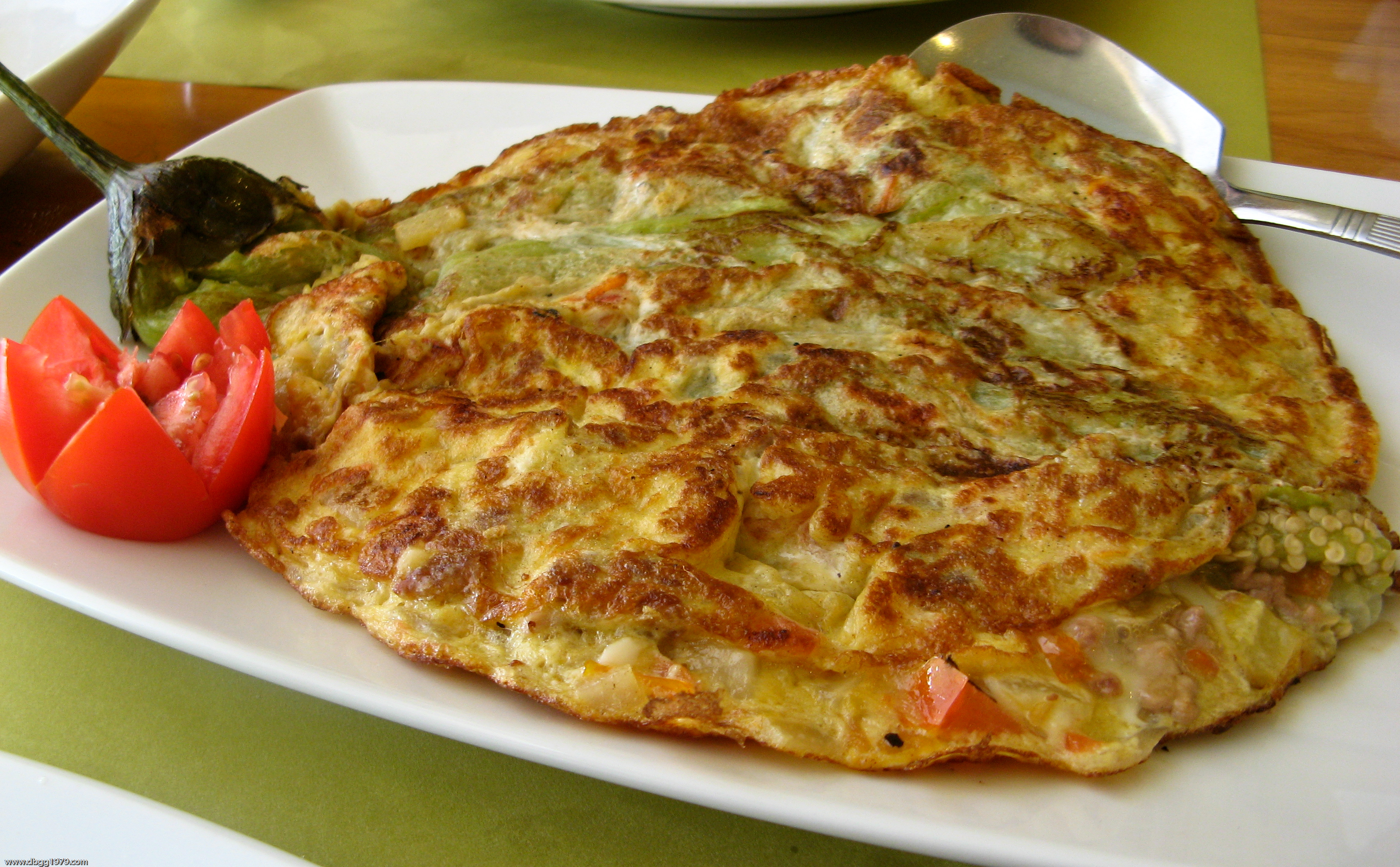
Philippine rellenong talong, an eggplant omelette stuffed with ground meat and vegetables

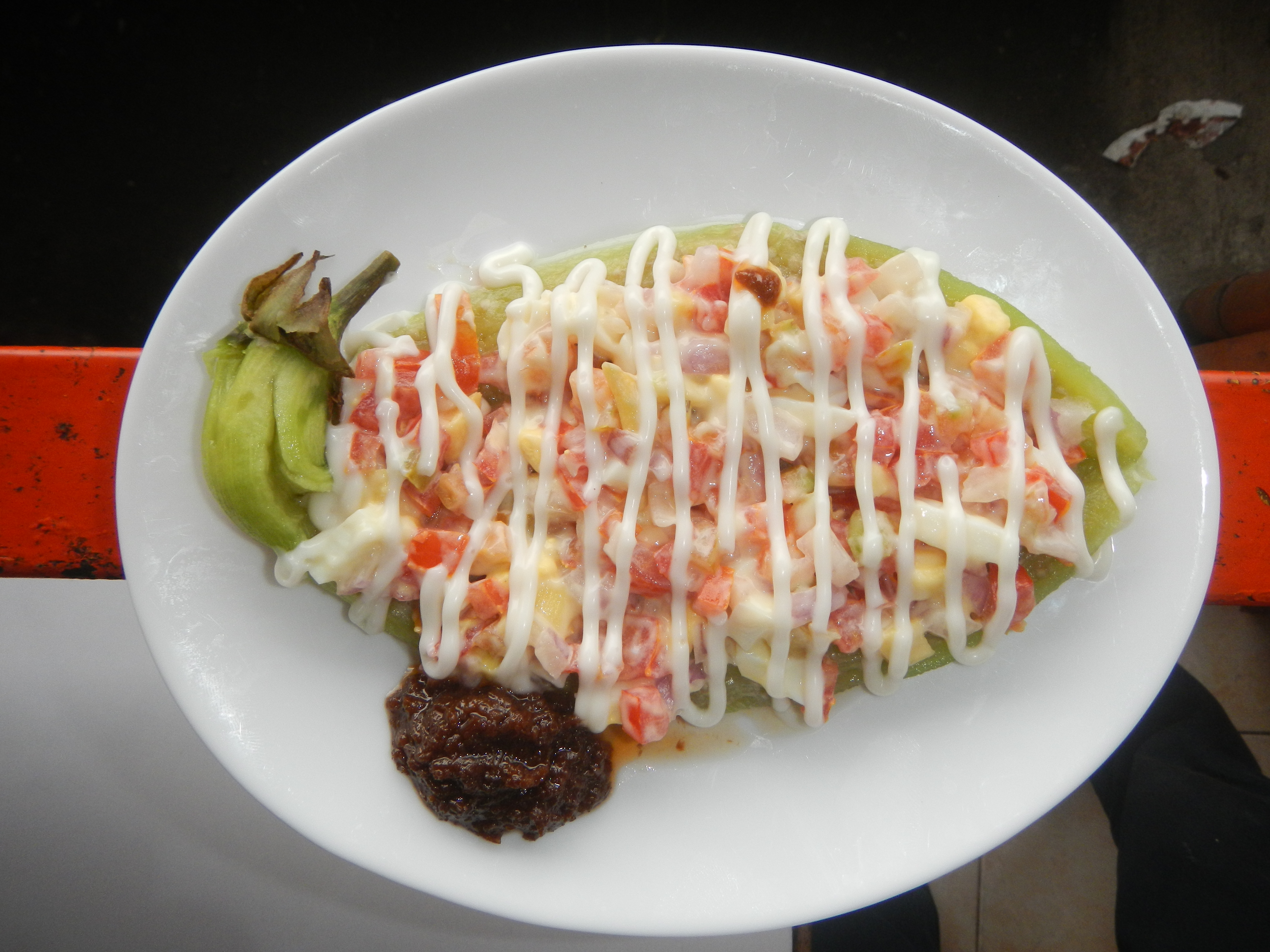
Philippine ensaladang talong, a salad on grilled and skinned green eggplant

==== South Asia ====
Eggplant is widely used in its native India, for example in sambar (a tamarind lentil stew), dalma (a dal preparation with vegetables, native to Odisha), chutney, curry (vankai), and achaar (a pickled dish). Owing to its versatile nature and wide use in both everyday and festive Indian food, it is often described as the "king of vegetables". Roasted, skinned, mashed, mixed with onions, tomatoes, and spices, and then slow cooked gives the South Asian dish baingan bharta or gojju, similar to salată de vinete in Romania. Another version of the dish, begun-pora (eggplant charred or burnt), is very popular in east Indian states of Odisha and West Bengal as well as Bangladesh, where the pulp of the vegetable is mixed with raw chopped shallot, green chilies, salt, fresh coriander, and mustard oil. Sometimes fried tomatoes and deep-fried potatoes are also added, creating a dish called begun bhorta. In a dish from Maharashtra called bharli vangi, small brinjals are stuffed with ground coconut, peanuts, onions, tamarind, jaggery and masala spices, and then cooked in oil. Maharashtra and the adjacent state of Karnataka also have an eggplant-based vegetarian pilaf called 'vangi bhat'.

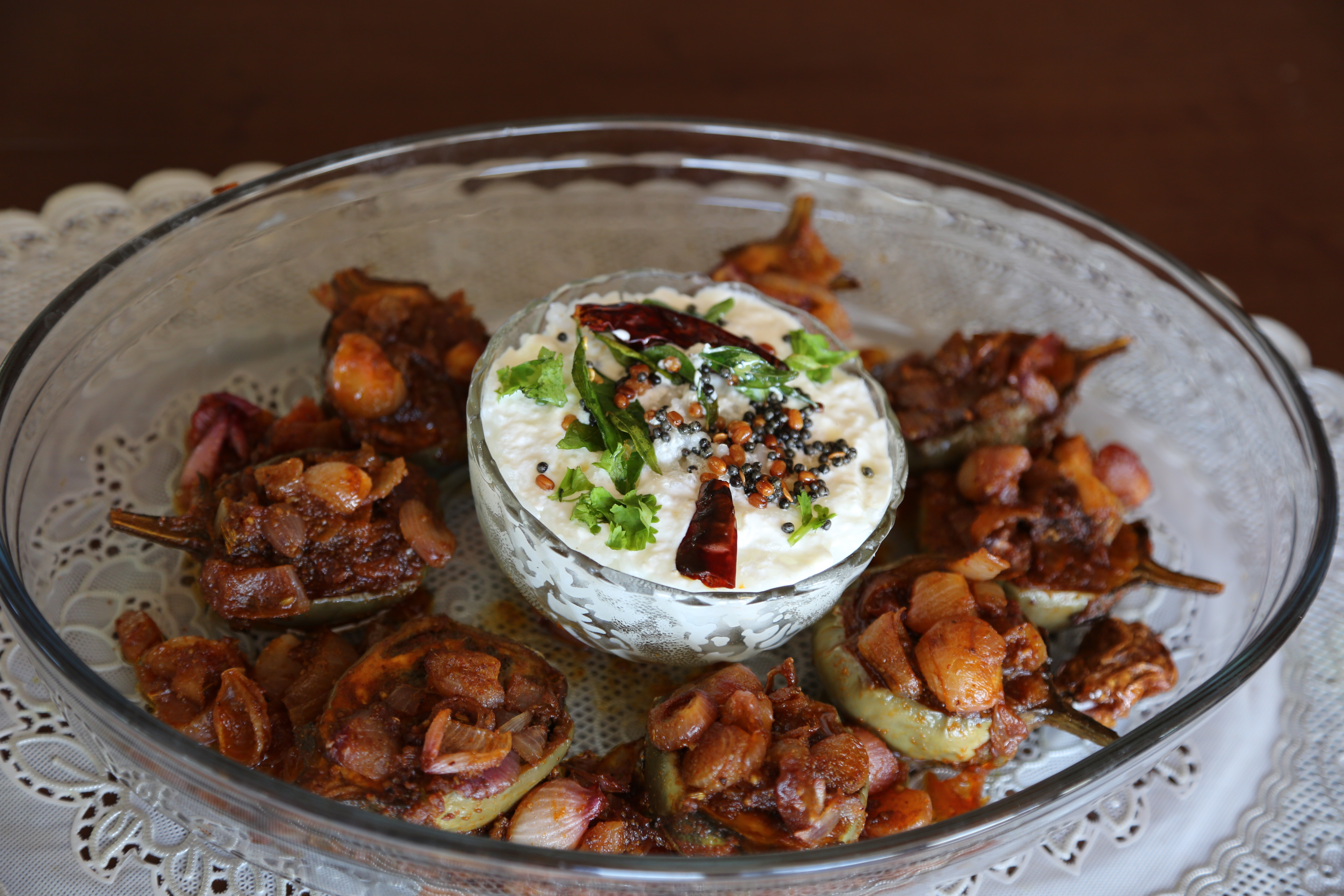
Brinjal masala fry

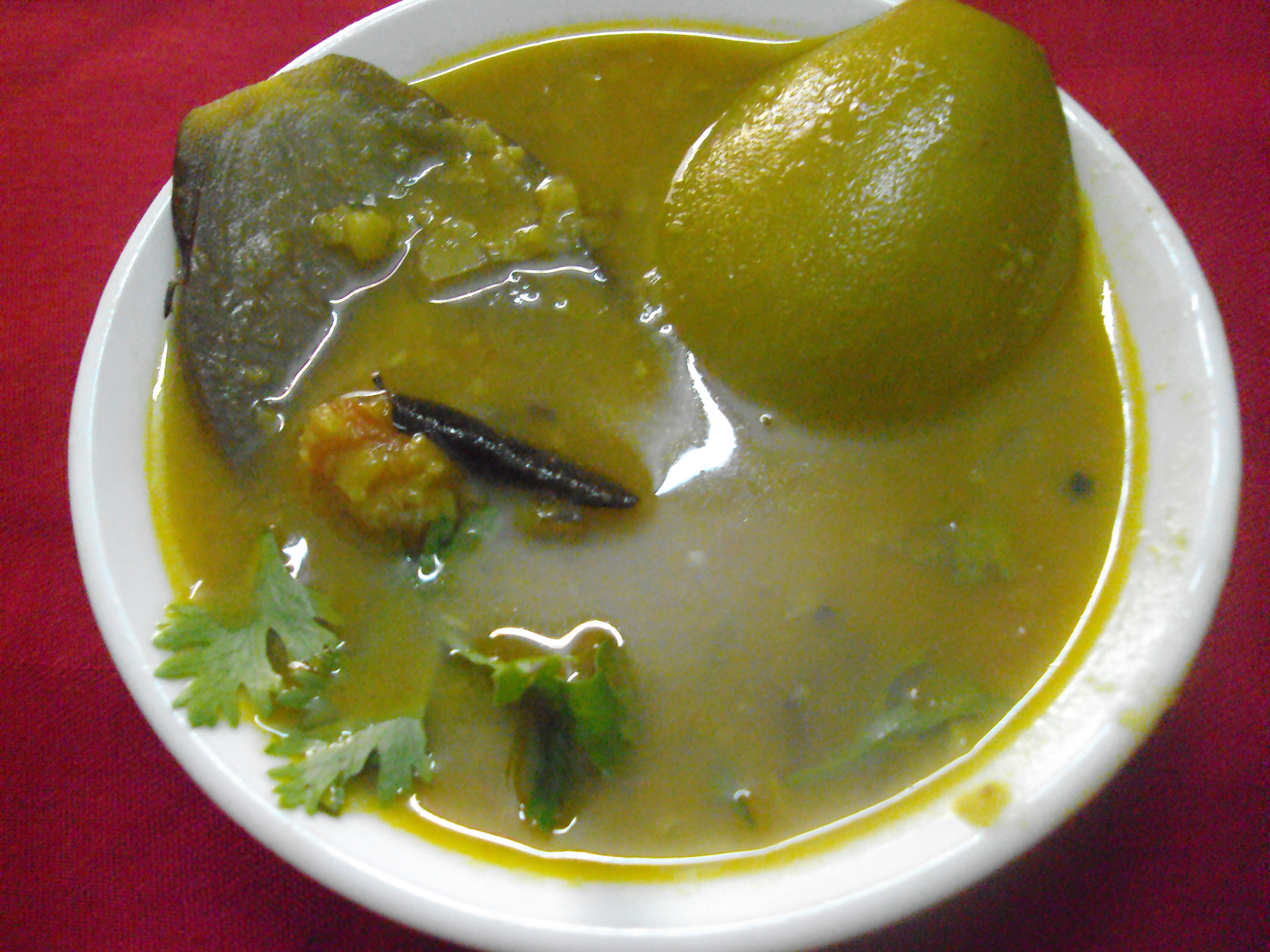
Brinjal and mango sambar

==== Middle East and the Mediterranean ====
Eggplant is often stewed, as in the French ratatouille, or deep-fried as in the Italian parmigiana di melanzane, the Turkish karnıyarık, or Turkish, Greek, and Levantine musakka/moussaka, and Middle Eastern and South Asian dishes. Eggplants can also be battered before deep-frying and served with a sauce made of tahini and tamarind. In Iranian cuisine, it is blended with whey as kashk e bademjan, tomatoes as mirza ghassemi, or made into stew as khoresht-e-bademjan. It can be sliced and deep-fried, then served with plain yogurt (optionally topped with a tomato and garlic sauce), such as in the Turkish dish patlıcan kızartması (meaning fried aubergines), or without yogurt, as in patlıcan şakşuka. Perhaps the best-known Turkish eggplant dishes are imam bayıldı (vegetarian) and karnıyarık (with minced meat). It may also be roasted in its skin until charred, so the pulp can be removed and blended with other ingredients, such as lemon, tahini, and garlic, as in the Levantine baba ghanoush, Greek melitzanosalata, Moroccan zaalouk and Romanian salată de vinete. A mix of roasted eggplant, roasted red peppers, chopped onions, tomatoes, mushrooms, carrots, celery, and spices is called zacuscă in Romania, and ajvar or pinjur in the Balkans.

A Spanish dish called escalivada in Catalonia calls for strips of roasted aubergine, sweet pepper, onion, and tomato. In Andalusia, eggplant is mostly cooked thinly sliced, deep-fried in olive oil and served hot with honey (berenjenas a la Cordobesa). In the La Mancha region of central Spain, a small eggplant is pickled in vinegar, paprika, olive oil, and red peppers. The result is berenjena of Almagro, Ciudad Real.

In the Eastern Mediterranean (including the Balkans), eggplant is prepared as dolma, i.e. hollowed out and stuffed with meat, rice, or other fillings, and then baked or braised. A Levantine specialty is makdous, another pickling of eggplants, stuffed with red peppers and walnuts in olive oil. In Georgia, eggplant is fried and stuffed with walnut paste to make nigvziani badrijani.

In medieval Spain, eggplant, along with ingredients such as Swiss chard and chickpeas, was closely associated with Jewish cuisine. The Kitāb al-Ṭabikh, a 13th-century Andalusian cookbook, features eggplant as the main ingredient in fifteen out of its nineteen vegetable dishes, indicating its significance in the local cuisine at the time. Jewish communities in Spain prepared eggplant in various ways, including in dishes like almodrote, a casserole of eggplant and cheese. This dish and others became identifiers for Jews during their expulsion from Spain and the Inquisition, and they were carried by the expelled Jews to their new homes in the Ottoman Empire. The classic Judaeo-Spanish song "Siete modos de gizar la berendgena" lists various methods of preparing eggplant that persisted among Jews in the Ottoman Empire. Today, eggplant remains a defining ingredient of Sephardic Jewish cuisine.

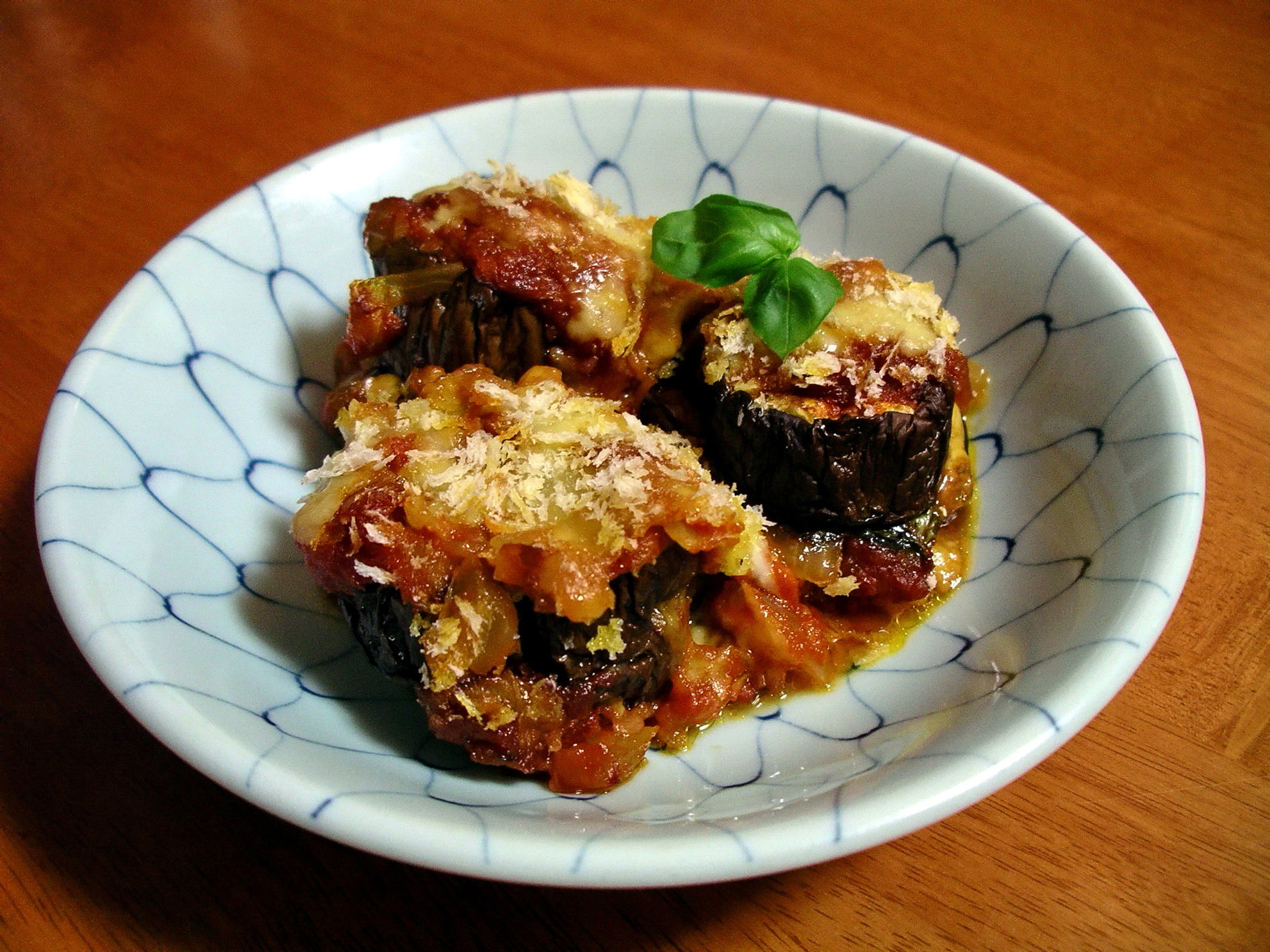
Parmigiana di melanzane (eggplant Parmesan)

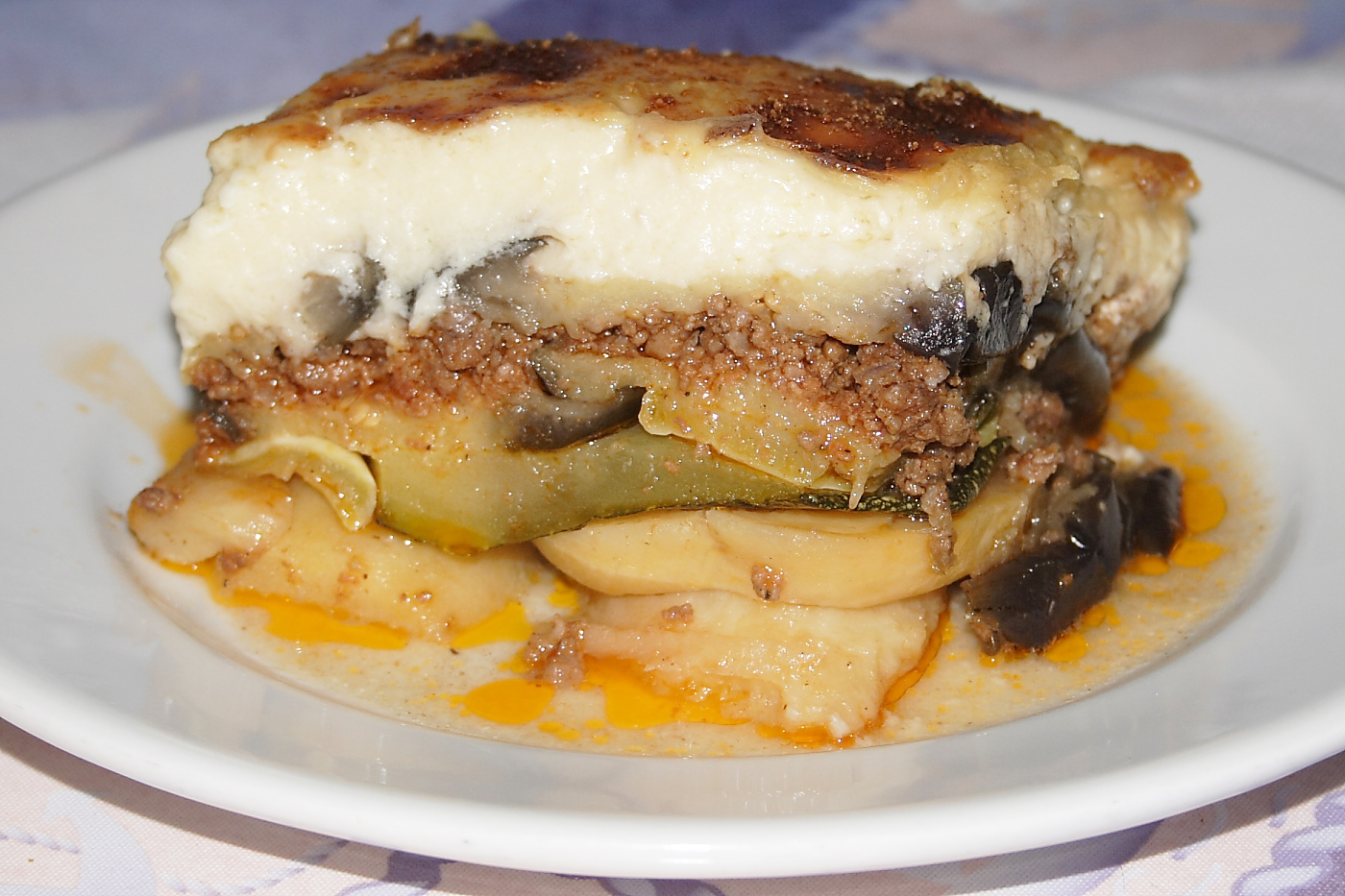
Greek moussaka

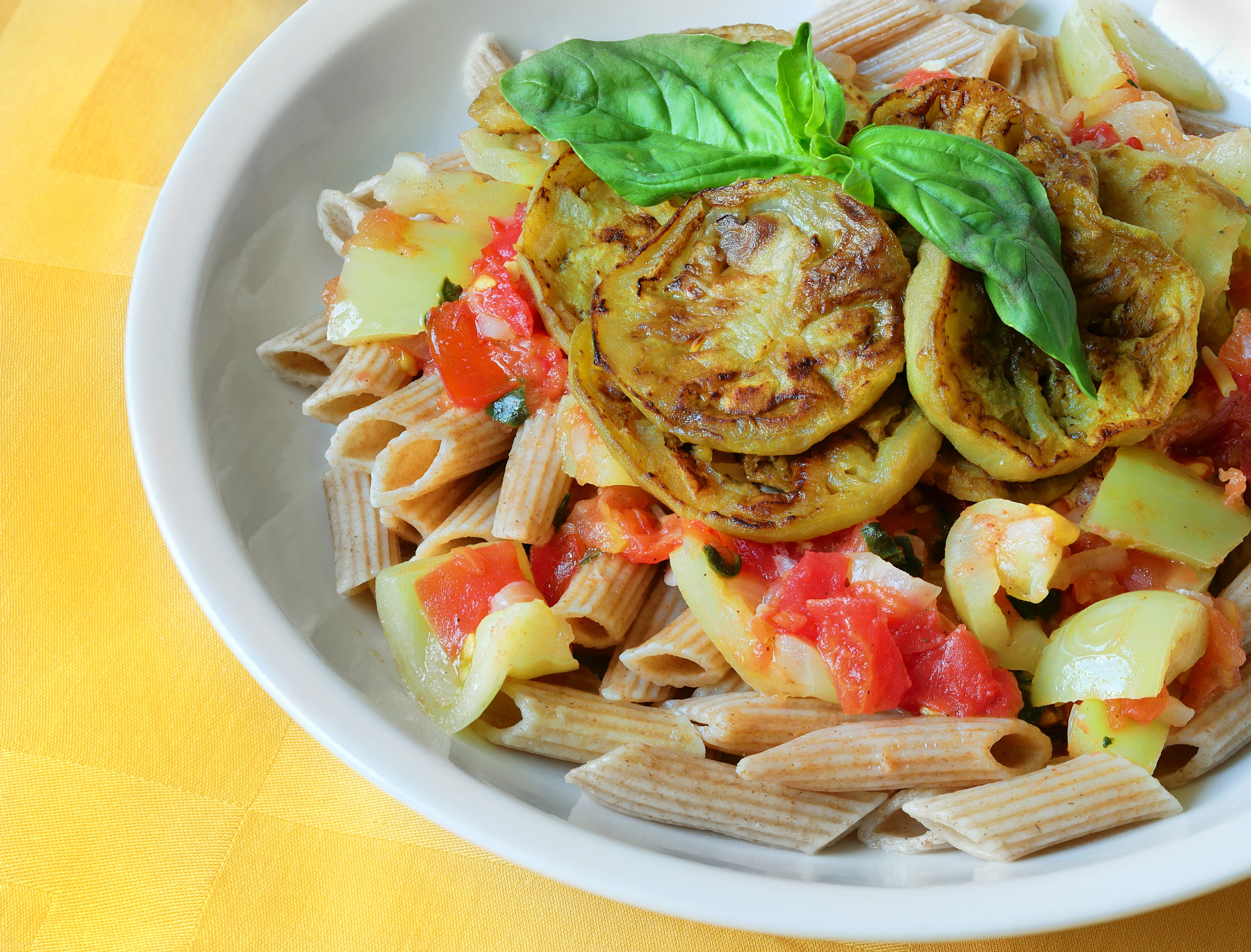
Penne with eggplant and basil in yogurt-tomato sauce

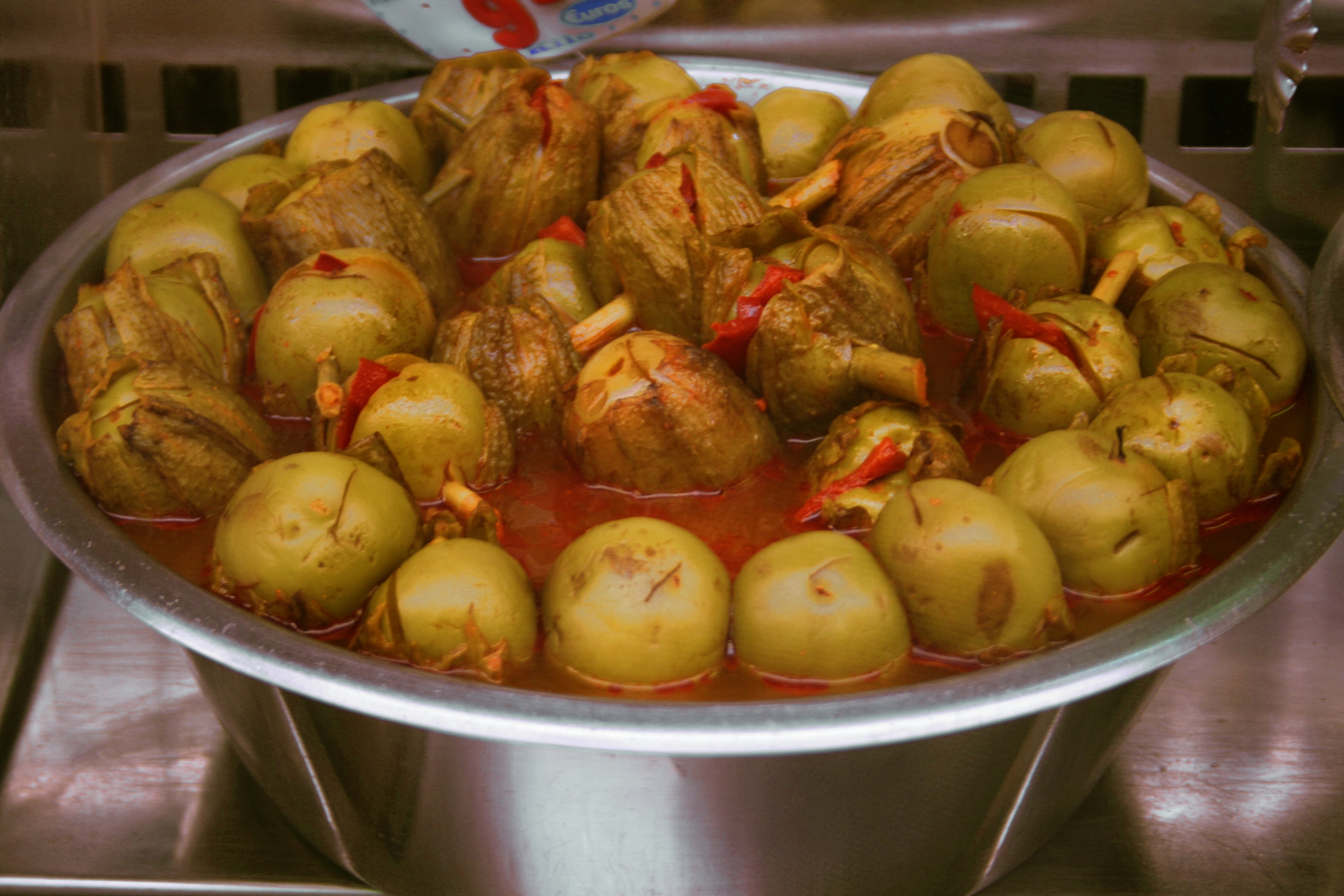
Almagro eggplant

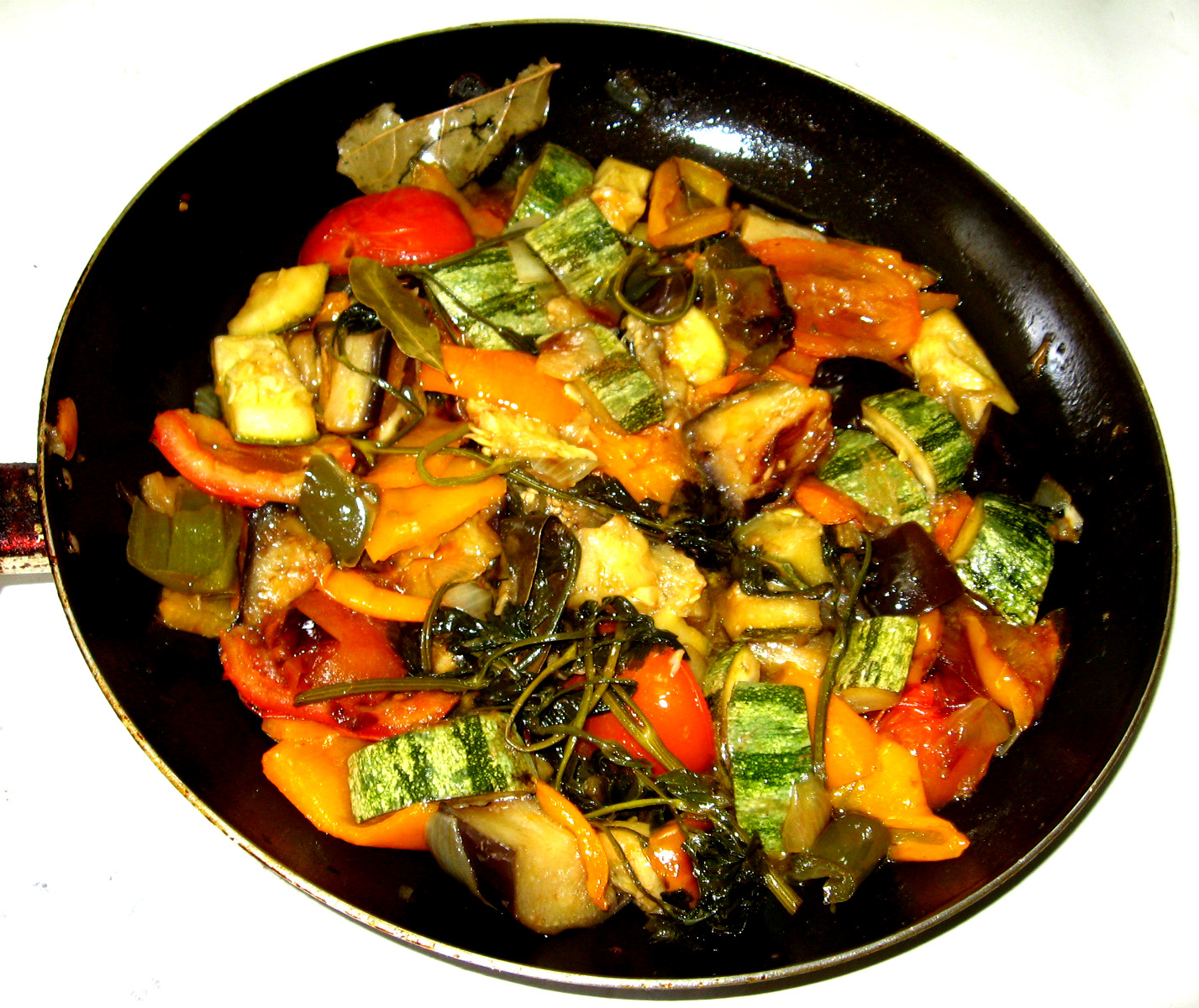
Ratatouille niçoise

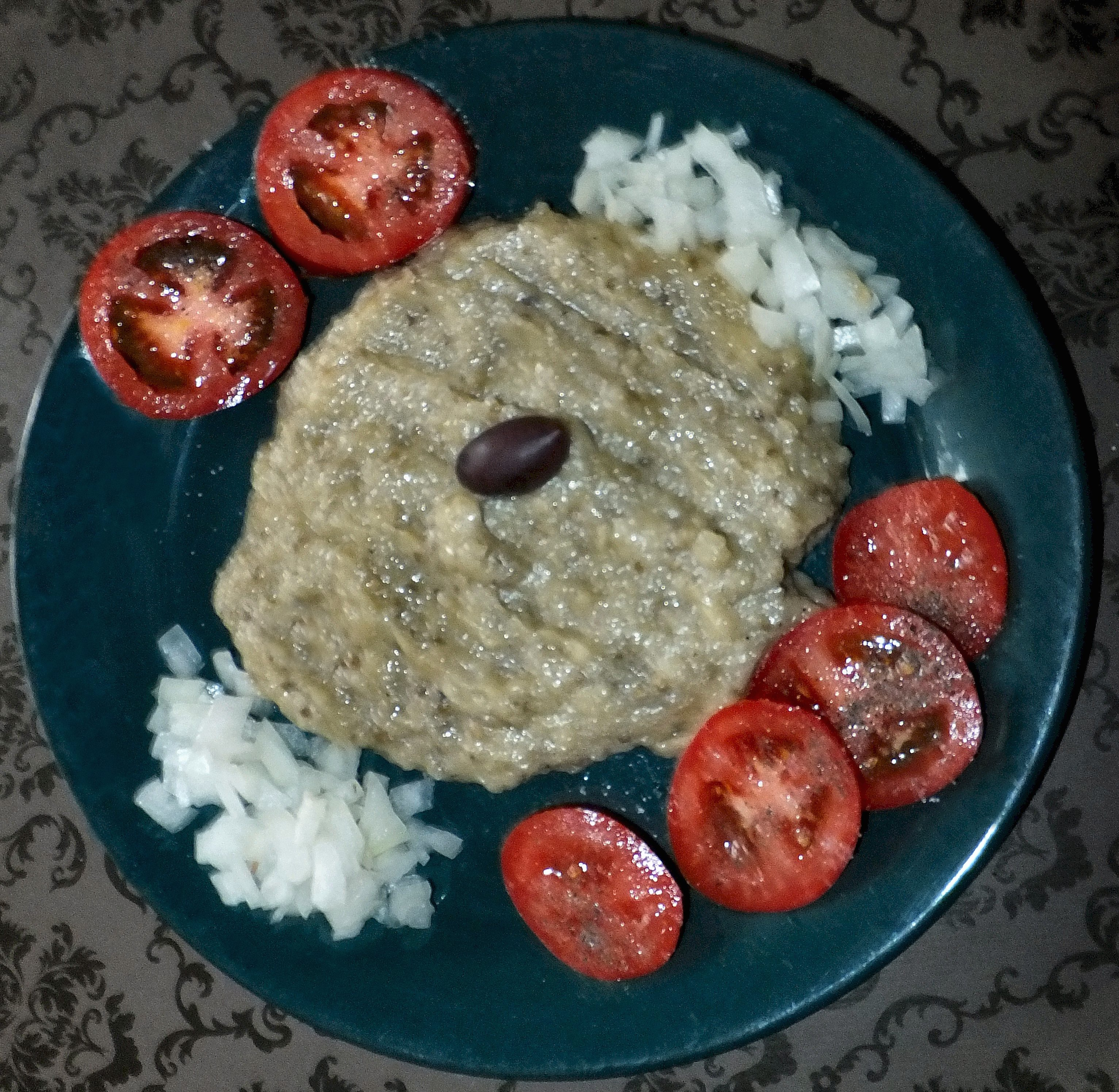
Romanian eggplant salad (salată de vinete)

==== Iran ====
In Iranian cuisine, eggplant (called bādenjān or bādemjān in Persian) can be used in both appetizers and main courses. It can also be pickled in vinegar. The ideal eggplant in Iranian cuisine is long, straight, firm, and black. Based on how al-Razi uses the color of eggplant as a shorthand for purpleness in his Kitab al-hawi, it can be assumed that the dark purple kind of eggplant was the widely grown variety in Iran at his time (9th century). Its importance in Iran is alluded to in the Ain-i-Akbari of Abu'l-Fazl ibn Mubarak, which says "this vegetable is on sale in the markets in Iran all the year round and in such abundance that it is sold for 1.5 dams per seer" (which was a cheap price at that time).

In Iran, unlike places like Greece, Turkey, and North Africa, eggplant is cooked peeled and usually seasoned with cinnamon or especially turmeric. Most eggplant dishes are classified as nankhoreshi (eaten with bread), and they are commonly served as snacks alongside alcoholic beverages.

The 14th-century poet Boshaq At'ema refers to an early eggplant dish called burani-e badenjan: chopped eggplant sautéed with onions and turmeric, then slowly cooked, and finally mixed with yogurt. The combination of eggplant and kashk (condensed whey) is popular in Iranian cuisine; it is found in dishes like kashk o badenjan as well as ash-e kashk o badenjan (involving layers of sautéed eggplant, grilled onions, and red beans topped by kashk seasoned with turmeric). Another eggplant dish is mast o badenjan, also known as nazkhatun in Tehran, which involves eggplant, yogurt, and dried mint. Eggplant can also be cooked in stews (khoreshes), either with lamb (khoresh-e badenjan) or with chicken and either unripe grapes or pomegranate juice (mosamma-ye badenjan). Variants of ab-gusht, eshkana, fesenjan, and kuku also make use of eggplant. Some regional dishes involving eggplant include badenjan-polow, a dish mainly from Fars and Kerman that combines white rice with a paste of chopped sautéed eggplant, chopped meat, and spices; as well as the northern Iranian badenjan-e qasemi, a casserole using grilled eggplant, garlic, tomatoes, and eggs.

Eggplants are traditionally among the foods that get preserved and stored for winter in Iran. They are selected in the last month of summer, when they are most readily available, then peeled, and finally preserved in one of two ways. In the first way, the peeled eggplants are cut, salted, and left to "sweat" (to make them less bilious); then they are sun-dried by hanging them on a line. The dried eggplants are then rehydrated 24 hours before being cooked. In the second way, the peeled eggplants are cooked in oil, put in a copper pot, and finally covered with plenty of hot oil, "which congeals to seal them".

Medieval Iranian writers such as al-Razi and al-Biruni cautioned that eggplant contains harmful qualities, and it must be ripe and cooked before eating to neutralize them. They wrote that it could cause heat and dryness and an excess of black bile, contributing to a wide range of health problems. If the "salt" in it was removed, or it was cooked in oil or vinegar, then they wrote that eggplant gained healthy attributes. Present-day Iranian attitudes to the eggplant reflect this medical tradition's influence: the eggplant is "considered rather dangerous... a cook in Tehran will say that the poison must be taken out". People also use eggplant seeds as an expectorant to relieve asthma and catarrh.

== Nutrition ==
Eggplant, raw
Nutritional value per 100 g (3.5 oz)
- Energy: 104 kJ (25 kcal)
- Carbohydrates: 5.88 g
- Sugars: 3.53 g
- Dietary fiber: 3 g
- Fat: 0.18 g
- Protein: 0.98 g
Vitamins and minerals
Vitamins	Quantity %DV^{†}
Thiamine (B1)	3% 0.039 mg
Riboflavin (B2)	3% 0.037 mg
Niacin (B3)	4% 0.649 mg
Pantothenic acid (B5)	6% 0.281 mg
Vitamin B6	5% 0.084 mg
Folate (B9)	6% 22 μg
Vitamin C	2% 2.2 mg
Vitamin E	2% 0.3 mg
Vitamin K	3% 3.5 μg
Minerals	Quantity %DV^{†}
Calcium	1% 9 mg
Iron	1% 0.23 mg
Magnesium	3% 14 mg
Manganese	10% 0.232 mg
Phosphorus	2% 24 mg
Potassium	8% 229 mg
Zinc	1% 0.16 mg
- Other constituents: Quantity
- Water: 92 g
- Link to USDA Database entry
- ^{†}Percentages estimated using US recommendations for adults, except for potassium, which is estimated based on expert recommendation from the National Academies.

Raw eggplant is 92% water, 6% carbohydrates, 1% protein, and has negligible fat (table). It provides low amounts of essential nutrients, with only manganese having a moderate percentage (10%) of the Daily Value. Minor changes in nutrient composition occur with season, environment of cultivation (open field or greenhouse), and genotype.

== Cultivation and pests ==
In tropical and subtropical climates, eggplant can be sown in the garden. Eggplant grown in temperate climates fares better when transplanted into the garden after all danger of frost has passed. Eggplant prefers hot weather, and when grown in cold climates or in areas with low humidity, the plants languish or fail to set and produce mature fruit. Seeds are typically started eight to 10 weeks prior to the anticipated frost-free date. S. melongena is included on a list of low flammability plants, indicating that it is suitable for growing within a building protection zone.

Spacing should be 45 to 60 cm (18 to 24 in) between plants, depending on cultivar, and 60 to 90 cm (24 to 35 in) between rows, depending on the type of cultivation equipment being used. Mulching helps conserve moisture and prevent weeds and fungal diseases and the plants benefit from some shade during the hottest part of the day. Hand pollination by shaking the flowers improves the set of the first blossoms. Growers typically cut fruits from the vine just above the calyx owing to the somewhat woody stems. Flowers are complete, containing both female and male structures, and may be self- or cross-pollinated.

Many of the pests and diseases that afflict other solanaceous plants, such as tomatoes, capsicums, and potatoes, are also troublesome to eggplants. For this reason, it should generally not be planted in areas previously occupied by its close relatives. However, since eggplants can be particularly susceptible to pests such as whiteflies, they are sometimes grown with slightly less susceptible plants, such as chili pepper, as a sacrificial trap crop. Four years should separate successive crops of eggplants to reduce pest pressure.

Common North American pests include the potato beetles, flea beetles, aphids, whiteflies, and spider mites. Good sanitation and crop rotation practices are extremely important for controlling fungal disease, the most serious of which is Verticillium.

The potato tuber moth (Phthorimaea operculella) is an oligophagous insect that prefers to feed on plants of the family Solanaceae such as eggplants. Female P. operculella use the leaves to lay their eggs and the hatched larvae will eat away at the mesophyll of the leaf.

Several different Phytoplasmas cause little leaf of brinjal, which is agriculturally significant in South Asia. This is spread by the leafhopper Hishimonus phycitis.

== Production ==
Eggplant production 2024, millions of tonnes
China	34.9
India	13.0
Egypt	1.8
Guinea	1.0
Turkey	0.8
World	57.5
Source: FAOSTAT of the United Nations

In 2024, world production of eggplants was 57.5 million tonnes, led by China with 61% and India with 23% of the total (table).

Production of eggplants

Eggplant yield

== Chemistry ==
The color of purple skin cultivars is due to the anthocyanin nasunin.

The browning of eggplant flesh results from the oxidation of polyphenols, such as the most abundant phenolic compound in the fruit, chlorogenic acid.

== Allergies ==
Case reports of itchy skin or mouth, mild headache, and stomach upset after handling or eating eggplant have been reported anecdotally and published in medical journals (see also oral allergy syndrome). A 2021 review indicated that possibly four interacting mechanisms may elicit an allergic response from consuming eggplant: lipid transfer protein, profilin, polyphenol oxidase, and pollen reactions.

A 2008 study of a sample of 741 people in India, where eggplant is commonly consumed, found nearly 10% reported some allergic symptoms after consuming eggplant, with 1.4% showing symptoms within two hours. Contact dermatitis from eggplant leaves and allergy to eggplant flower pollen have also been reported.

Individuals who are atopic (genetically predisposed to developing certain allergic hypersensitivity reactions) are more likely to have a reaction to eggplant, which may be because eggplant is high in histamines. Cooking eggplant thoroughly seems to preclude reactions in some individuals, but some of the allergenic proteins may survive the cooking process.

== Taxonomy ==
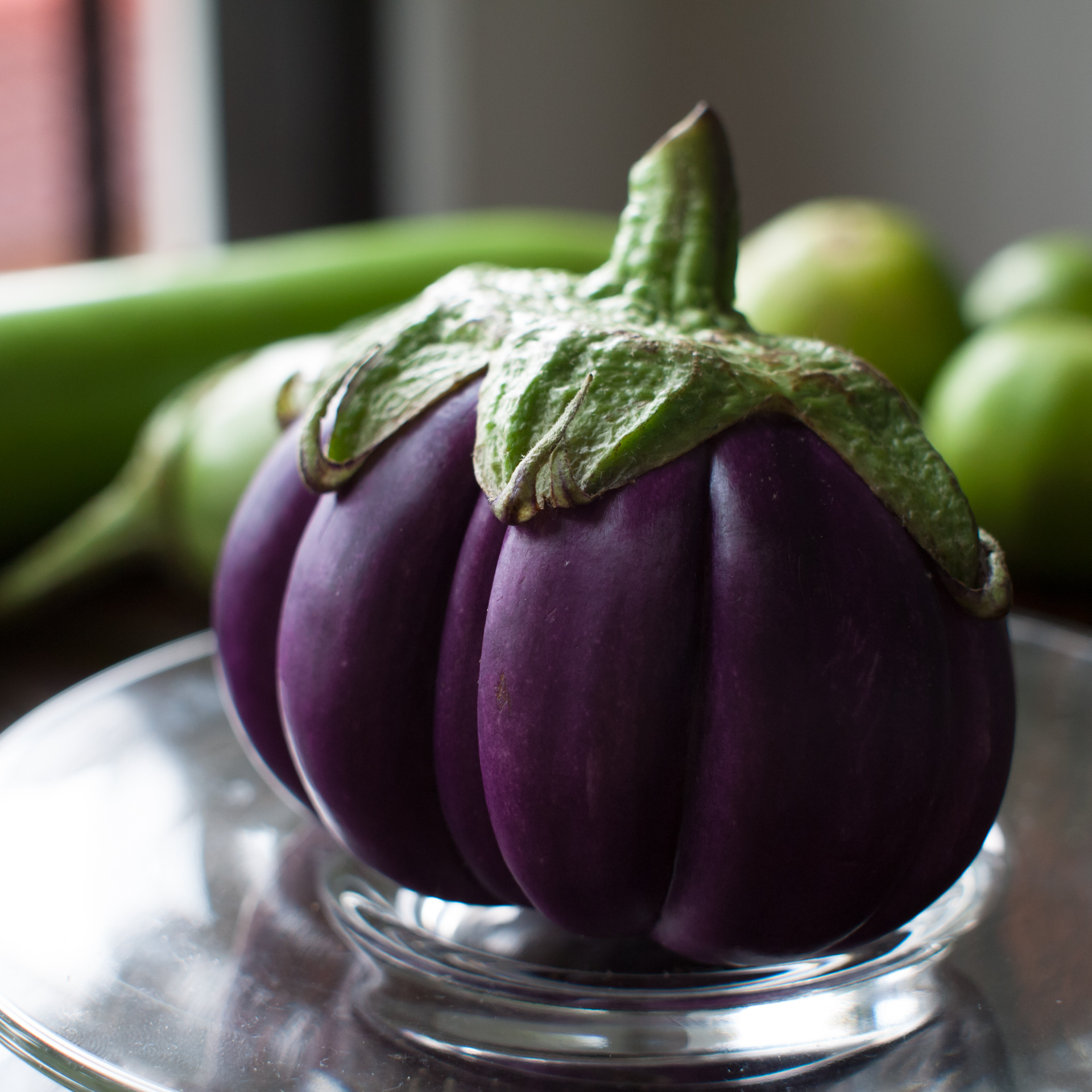
Segmented purple eggplant

The eggplant is quite often featured in the older scientific literature under the junior synonyms S. ovigerum and S. trongum. Several other names that are now invalid have been uniquely applied to it:

- Melongena ovata Mill.
- Solanum album Noronha
- Solanum insanum L.
- Solanum longum Roxb.
- Solanum melanocarpum Dunal
- Solanum melongenum St.-Lag.
- Solanum oviferum Salisb.
- Prachi Salisb.

A number of subspecies and varieties have been named, mainly by Dikii, Dunal, and (invalidly) by Sweet. Names for various eggplant types, such as agreste, album, divaricatum, esculentum, giganteum, globosi, inerme, insanum, leucoum, luteum, multifidum, oblongo-cylindricum, ovigera, racemiflorum, racemosum, ruber, rumphii, sinuatorepandum, stenoleucum, subrepandum, tongdongense, variegatum, violaceum, viride, are not considered to refer to anything more than cultivar groups at best. However, Solanum incanum and cockroach berry (S. capsicoides), other eggplant-like nightshades described by Linnaeus and Allioni, respectively, were occasionally considered eggplant varieties, but this is not correct.

The eggplant has a long history of taxonomic confusion with the scarlet and Ethiopian eggplants (Solanum aethiopicum), known as gilo and nakati, respectively, and described by Linnaeus as S. aethiopicum. The eggplant was sometimes considered a variety violaceum of that species. S. violaceum of de Candolle applies to Linnaeus' S. aethiopicum. An actual S. violaceum, an unrelated plant described by Ortega, included Dunal's S. amblymerum and was often confused with the same author's S. brownii.

Like the potato and S. lichtensteinii, but unlike the tomato, which then was generally put in a different genus, the eggplant was also described as S. esculentum, in this case once more in the course of Dunal's work. He also recognized the varieties aculeatum, inerme, and subinerme at that time. Similarly, H.C.F. Schuhmacher and Peter Thonning named the eggplant as S. edule, which is also a junior synonym of sticky nightshade (S. sisymbriifolium). Scopoli's S. zeylanicum refers to the eggplant, and that of Blanco to S. lasiocarpum.

== Culture ==
Vegetable orchestras, such as the London Vegetable Orchestra use zucchini trumpets, butternut squash trombones, pumpkin drums and aubergine castanets. Other vegetables played include carrots, bell peppers, potatoes and parsnips.

In Jainism, the consumption of eggplant (commonly referred to as brinjal in South Asia) is strictly prohibited. This dietary restriction is governed by the religion's foundational principle of nonviolence (ahimsa). Within classical Jain biological taxonomy, eggplants are often avoided because their dense, fleshy, and multi-seeded structure makes them highly susceptible to harboring mobile insects (trasa jiva) and microscopic lifeforms (nigoda). Furthermore, some Jain traditions classify the plant as ananthkay—a body containing an infinite number of microscopic souls—meaning its consumption would result in mass violence against living organisms.

== See also ==
- List of eggplant cultivars
- Eggplant emoji
- Eggplant production in China
- Eggplant salads and appetizers
- Imperial examination in Chinese mythology
- List of eggplant dishes
- Solanum aethiopicum
- Vietnamese eggplant
