= List of eggplant cultivars =

This is a list of eggplant cultivars:

Image	Common name	Color	Additional information	Refs
	Listada de Gandia	Purple and white stripes	also named Graffiti eggplant, Shooting star, Purple rain, and the Pandora stripe rose.	
	Rosa Bianca	Purple and white		
	Bianca	White and soft purple		
	Orient Charm	Light purple		
	Orient Express	Purple		
	Japanese eggplant	Light purple		
	Lavender Touch	Light purple and white		
	Ratna	Purple		
	Thai eggplant	Green and white stripes		
	Indian eggplant	Deep purple		
	Udupi Mattu Gulla	Green-white		

- Easter white eggplant
- Santana eggplant
- White eggplant - commons:Category:White eggplant
  - Tango eggplant

Eggplant-related fruits

Image	Common name	Color	Additional information	Refs
	Scarlet eggplant	Green		
	Ethiopian eggplant	Green		
	Vietnamese eggplant	Light green		
