= Vankai =

Variety of eggplant

Vankai is a variety of Brinjal, a type of eggplant or aubergine, found in southern India. In the state of Andhra Pradesh it is famous for its use in making curry.
