= Little leaf of brinjal =

Plant disease

Little leaf of brinjal is one of the most serious diseases of brinjal in the areas of its cultivation. "Brinjal" is a common name in some areas for the plant species Solanum melongena, the eggplant. The disease is known to cause heavy economic losses in India. As the name indicates, symptoms of the disease include shortening of the petioles and production of leaves which are much smaller in size than are normal for the species. Petioles are so short that leaves appear to be glued to the stem. They become soft, glabrous, somewhat yellow. Affected plants do not bear any flowers or fruits if infection is in early stages of plant growth. In cases of late season infections, fruits may remain small, become hard and unfit for consumption or marketing. The disease is caused by a plant pathogenic mollicute, Phytoplasma (earlier known as mycoplasmalike organism or MLO) and is transmitted by the insect vector, Hishimonus phycitis which belongs to the group of leafhoppers.

== Control Measures ==
Management of the insect vector by means of insecticides and cultivation of resistant varieties are the principal means of management of the disease.

Other techniques include

- burning of infected plants
- crop rotation to ensure death of disease-causing pathogen
- spraying of varavion at a regular interval of 15 days
- Tetracycline antibiotic can also be used to treat the disease.

== Sources ==
- Azadvar Mehdi and Baranwal, V.K. (2012). Multilocus sequence analysis of phytoplasma associated with brinjal little leaf disease and its detection in Hishimonus phycitis in India. Phytopathogenic Mollicutes 2(1):15-21.
- Anjaneyulu, A. and Ramakrishnan, K. (1973). Host range of eggplant little leaf disease. Mysore Jour. Agr. Sci. 7:568-579.
- Chakrabarti, A.K. and Choudhury, B. (1975). Breeding brinjal resistant to little leaf disease. Proc. Ind. Nat. Sci. Acad. B 41:379-385.
- Kumar, J., Gunapati, S., Singh, S.P., Lalit, A., Sharma, N.C. and Tuli, R. (2012). First report of a Candidatus Phytoplasma asteris (16SrI group) associated with little leaf disease of Solanum melongena (brinjal) in India. New Disease Reports 26: 21.
- Mall, S., Panda, P. & Kumar, M. (2021). Molecular identification of brinjal little leaf disease associated with Solanum melongena L. in Eastern Uttar Pradesh, India. Indian Phytopathology 74, 1143–1146. doi:10.1007/s42360-021-00361-z
- Mayee, C.D. and Kaur, C. (1975). Little leaf incidence in relation to the vector population in some varieties of brinjal. Indian Phytopath. 28: 93–94.
- Mitra, D.K. (1988). Little leaf disease of eggplant In: Mycoplasma Diseases of Crops: Basic and Applied Aspects (Maramorosch, K. and Raychaudhuri, S.P., Ed.). ISBN 978-1-4612-8360-7, Springer New York. 343–348.
- Mote, N.N. and Joi, M.B. (1979). Control of little leaf of brinjal by insecticides. Jour. Maharashtra Agr. Univ. 2: 72–73.
- Mote, N.N., Joi, M.B. and Sonone, H.N. (1976). Screening of brinjal varieties to the little leaf disease under natural field conditions. Jour. Maharashtra Agr. Univ. 1: 305–306.
- Snehi, Parihar, S. S., & Jain, B. (2021). First report of a Jujube witches’‐broom phytoplasma (16SrV) strain associated with witches’‐broom and little leaf disease of Solanum melongena in India. New Disease Reports, 43(2). Portico. doi:10.1002/ndr2.12005
- Snehi, S.K., Raj, S.K. (2023). Association of a new species of 'Candidatus Phytoplasma' with little leaf disease of brinjal (Solanum melongena L.) from India. Indian Phytopathology 76, 937–942. doi:10.1007/s42360-023-00661-6
- Sohi, A.S., Bindra, O.S., & Deol, G.J. (1974). Studies on the control of the brinjal little-leaf disease and insect pests of brinjal. Indian Journal of Entomology, 36, 362-364.
- Thomas, K.M. and Krishnaswami, C.S. (1939). Little leaf-a transmissible disease of brinjal. Proceedings: Indian Academy of Sciences 10, 201-202. doi:10.1007/BF03039972
- Verma, R.K. and Dubey, G.S. (1976). Control of little leaf disease of brinjal: Chemotherapy and screening for resistance. Acta Bot. Indica 4:144-150.
- Yadav, V., Mahadevakumar, S., Janardhana, G., Amruthavalli, C., & Sreenivasa, M. (2015). Molecular Detection of Candidatus Phytoplasma Trifolii Associated with Little Leaf of Brinjal from Kerala State of Southern India. International Journal of Life Sciences, 9(6), 109–112. doi:10.3126/ijls.v9i6.13434
