= Ottoman cuisine =

Cuisine of the Ottoman Empire and its region

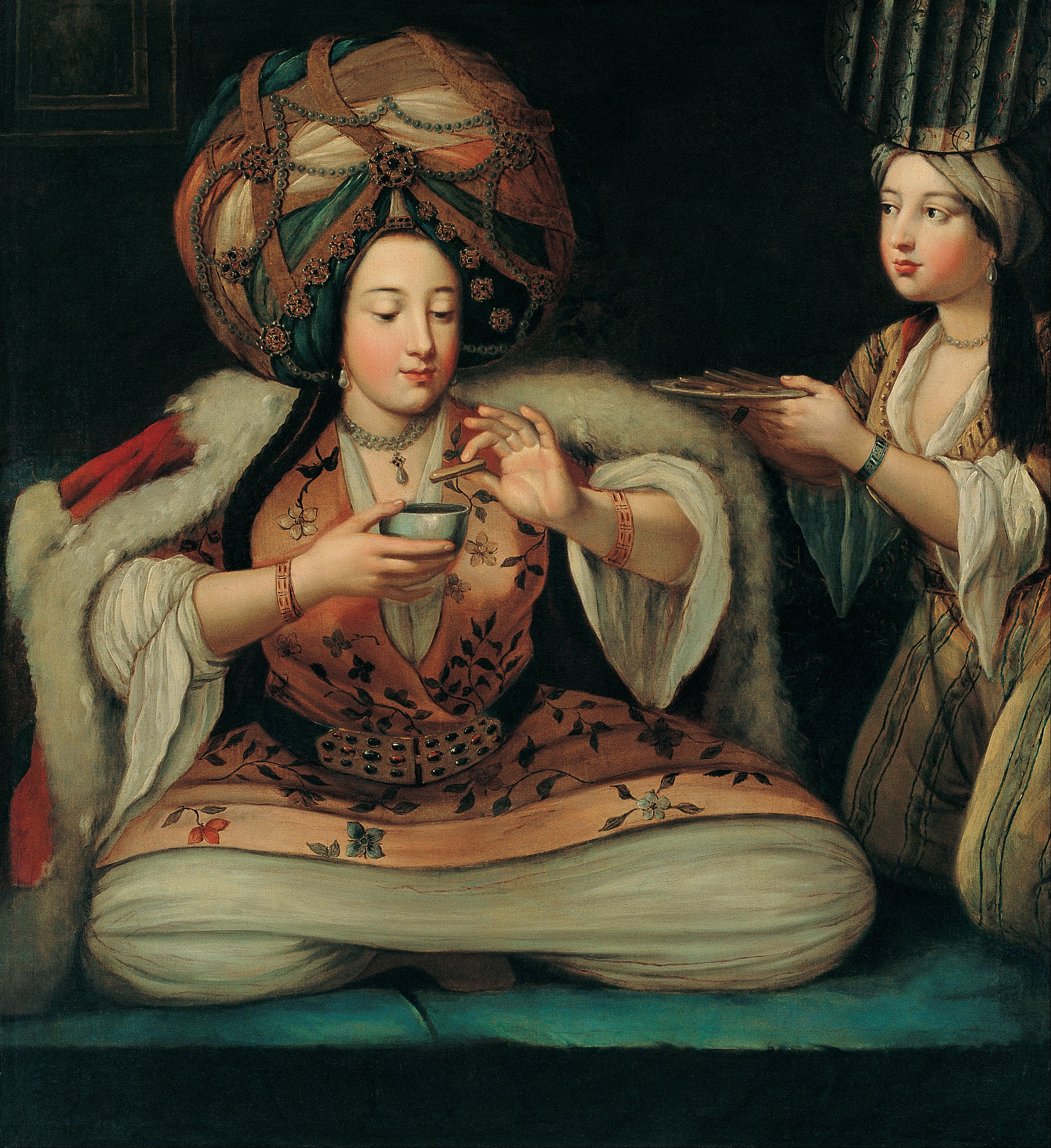
1750, Coffee delight at the harem, French School

Ottoman cuisine is the cuisine of the Ottoman Empire and its continuation in the cuisines of Turkey, the Balkans (including Hungary, Romania and Moldova), the Caucasus, the Middle East and Northern Africa.

== Sources ==
The Ottoman palace kitchen registers (matbah-i amire defterleri) are important primary sources for studies of early modern Ottoman cuisine containing information on ingredients and names of food dishes cooked by the palace kitchens.

Many cookbooks were published beginning in the 19th century reflecting the cultural fusions that characterized the rich cuisine of Istanbul's elites in the Late Ottoman period as new ingredients like tomatoes became widely available. There are few extant recipe collections before this era.

The earliest Ottoman cookbook is credited to Muhammad Shirvânî's 15th-century expansion of the earlier Arabic Kitab al-Tabikh by Muhammad bin Hasan al-Baghdadi.

Dīwān Lughāt al-Turk, the earliest comprehensive dictionary of the Turkic languages, is frequently used as a source for early Turkic food terminology and culinary practices, although such evidence must be interpreted cautiously when applied to later and geographically distant contexts.

== History ==
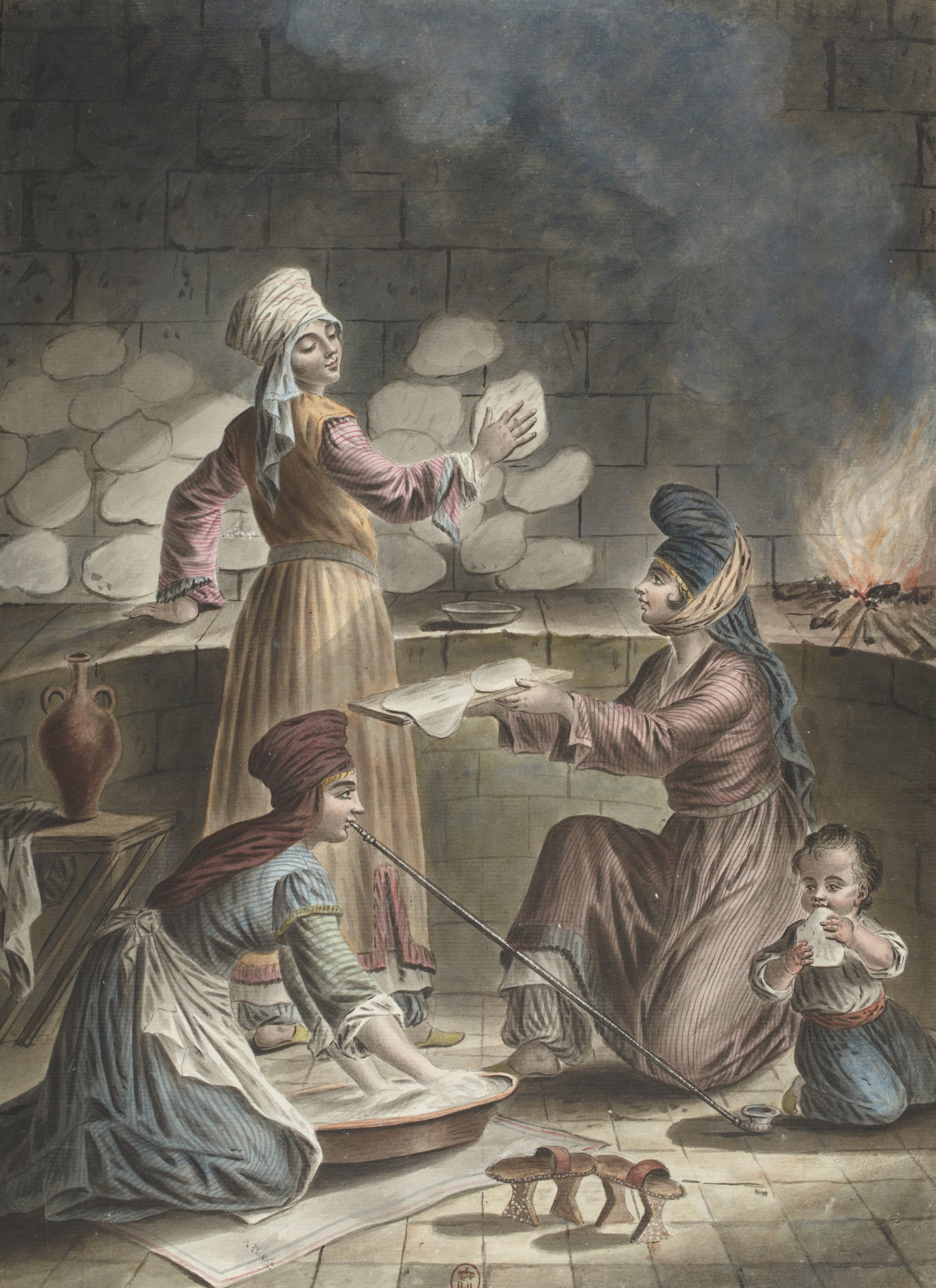
Turkish women baking bread, 1790

=== Development ===
Ottoman cuisine developed through long-term interaction among culinary traditions associated with Central Asia, the Persian and Arab region, Byzantine, and the empire's Balkan and Anatolian territories. Scholars of Ottoman food history have emphasized exchange, adaptation, and regional variation rather than a single line of culinary influence. After 1492, Ottoman foodways were also affected by the gradual adoption of ingredients that spread through the Columbian Exchange. Maxime Rodinson argued that, when similar dishes appear in both eastern and western traditions, historians must first determine whether they may share "a common, parallel origin in Graeco-Roman cooking" before attributing them to one-way oriental influence, since, according to Rodinson, Latin Europe, Islam and the Byzantine Empire all shared elements inherited from antiquity. This type of "mutual exchange and enrichment" is a typical feature of culinary history.

The Seljuk-era foodways of the Turkic tribes were influenced by the cultures they had encountered during their migrations from the Altay Mountains to Anatolia, including Persian cuisine.

=== New ingredients ===
Ottoman trade introduced new ingredients to the empire's regional cuisines, contributing to the evolving, unique character of Ottoman foodways. Levantine cuisine was enriched by the new ingredients from Asia and the Americas. Fernand Braudel credits the Ottomans with introducing rice, sesame and maize to the region.

Although tomatoes had entered the cuisine by the 1690s, they are not found in the few recipe manuscripts that survive from the 18th century. Ayşe Fahriye has recipes for both green tomatoes (kavata) and red tomatoes (domates) in Ev Kadını. Some of the recipes like tomato pilaf and dolma are still common in modern Turkish cuisine. Fahriye's 1882 cookbook is the last mention of green tomatoes in Ottoman cooking. Mehmet Kamil's influential 1844 manuscript includes recipes for tomato stew, stuffed tomato dolma and tomato pilaf.

=== Diffusion ===
The court cuisine was diffused through the provinces by Ottoman officials.

The influence of Ottoman cuisine in Europe beginning in the early 16th century is seen in dishes like sharbat, which spread first to Italy after Franceso I de'Medici requested a recipe for "Turkish sorbette" in 1577. Rice pudding, described in contemporaneous sources as "Turkish-style rice", was served at the wedding of Ercole I d'Este, Duke of Ferrara in 1529. Similar to the Western-style confection nougat, koz halva is found in the cuisines of Central Europe, where it is called Törökméz ('Turkish honey') in Hungarian, and Türkischer Honig in Austria and southern Germany.

== Characteristics ==
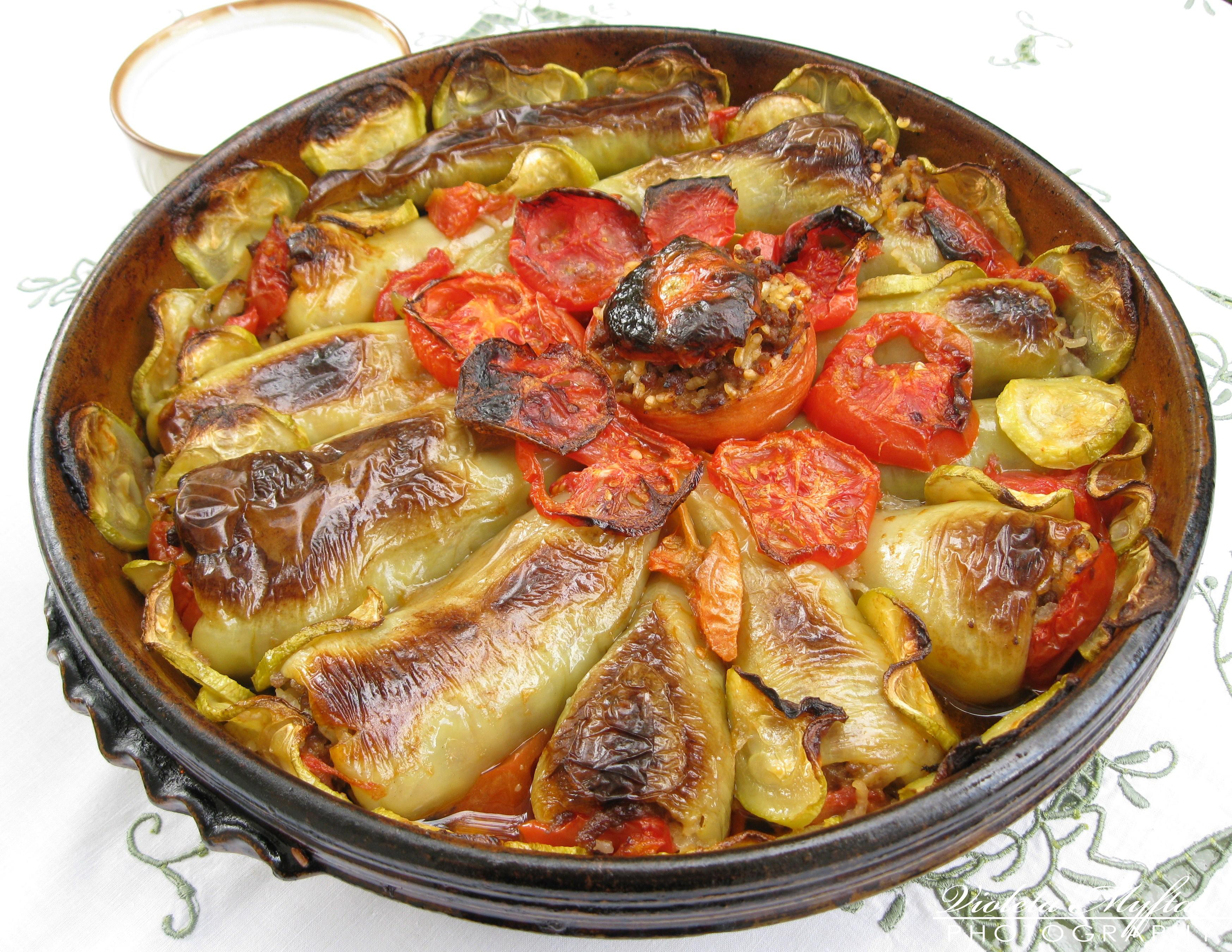
Dolma

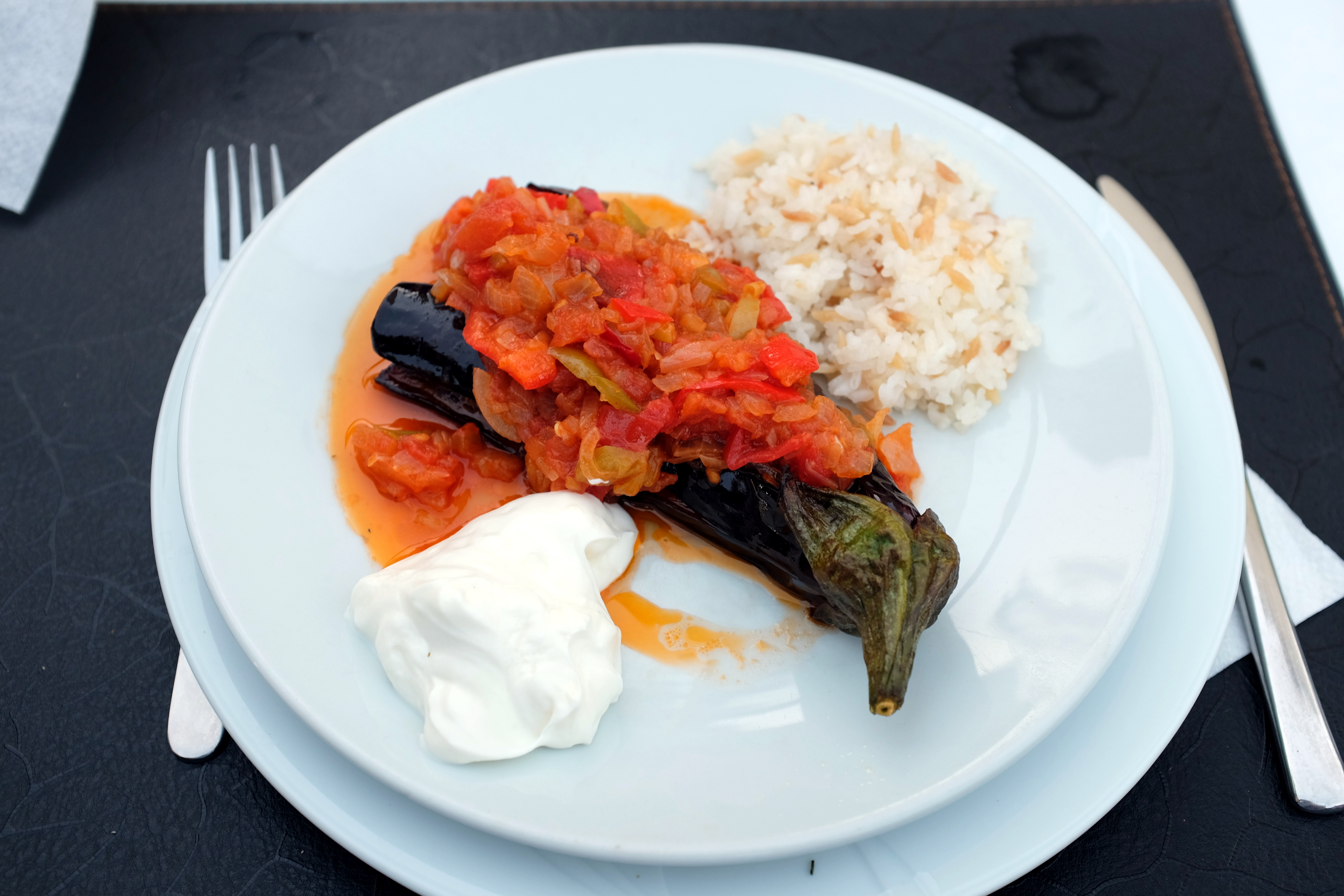
İmam bayıldı

The Ottoman Empire spanned three continents, representing a wide range of climate zones and flora and fauna, and so the cuisine includes not only the cuisine of the Ottoman palace, but a rich diversity of regional specialties.

=== Böreks and pastries ===
The iconic Ottoman stuffed pastry börek may be related to the triangular sanbusak pastries of Safavid cuisine. The cognate term senbuse appears in Turkish sources as early as the 13th century, becoming corrupted as samsa (Samsa are often associated with Uzbek cuisine.).

The term "börek" does not appear in Kashgari's dictionary but two recipes for pirak are recorded in the 14th-century Yinshan Zhengyao, a Chinese cookery manuscript from the Mongol Yuan era. The description of Danishmend Gazi's wedding feast in Danishmendname mentions both samsa and "well-buttered böreks".

Ottoman banquets in the 19th century served a mix of alafranga and alaturca foods. At these dinners, börek was sometimes replaced by the similar French pastry, bouchée or bouchée à la Reine.

The pastry boyoz (etymologically linked to the Spanish bollos meaning "small loaves") may date to the arrival of Sephardic Jews in 1492. In modern times the pastry is found mainly in the city of Izmir where it represents the cultural heritage and contributions of Ottoman Jews.

=== Bread ===
Bread was made with wheat and classified according to the quality and origin of the flour. Istanbul's demand for grain could not be met by local production alone and it received shipments from the Thracian coastlands, western Anatolia, Dobruja, Macedonia and Thessaly.

Many types of bread were baked in the palace kitchens—flat white bread (fodula), loaves of good quality whole wheat (somun) and white bread (fırancala) and filo (yufka). The addition of seeds like sesame and aniseed, or spices like cloves, was considered a luxury. Evliya Çelebi noted "the fine white Mudejar francala bread", referring to the European-style bread baked by the Mudéjar in Galata.

Lapa, keşkek and other Ottoman porridge dishes were less expensive alternatives to white bread.

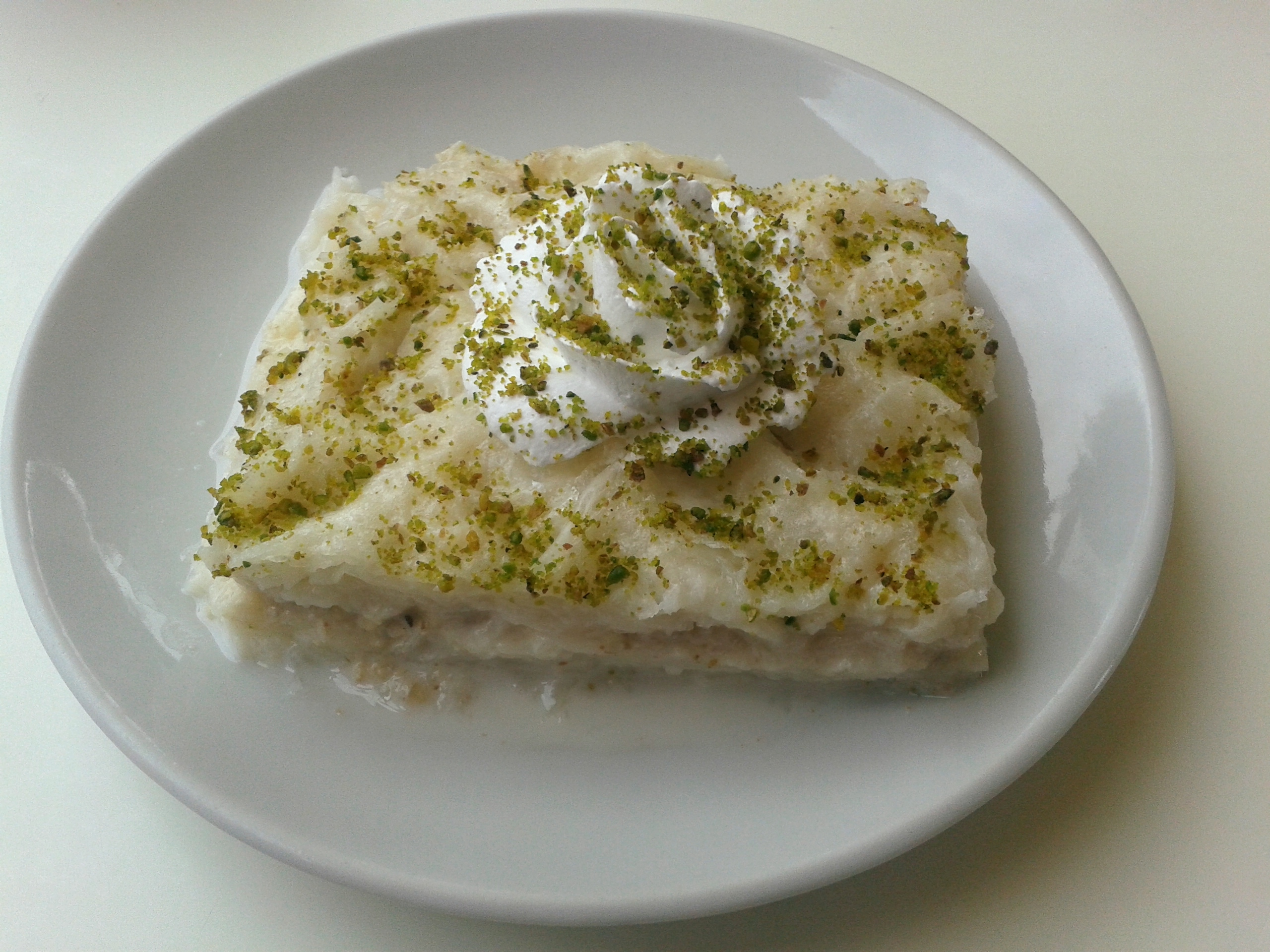
Güllaç

=== Desserts ===
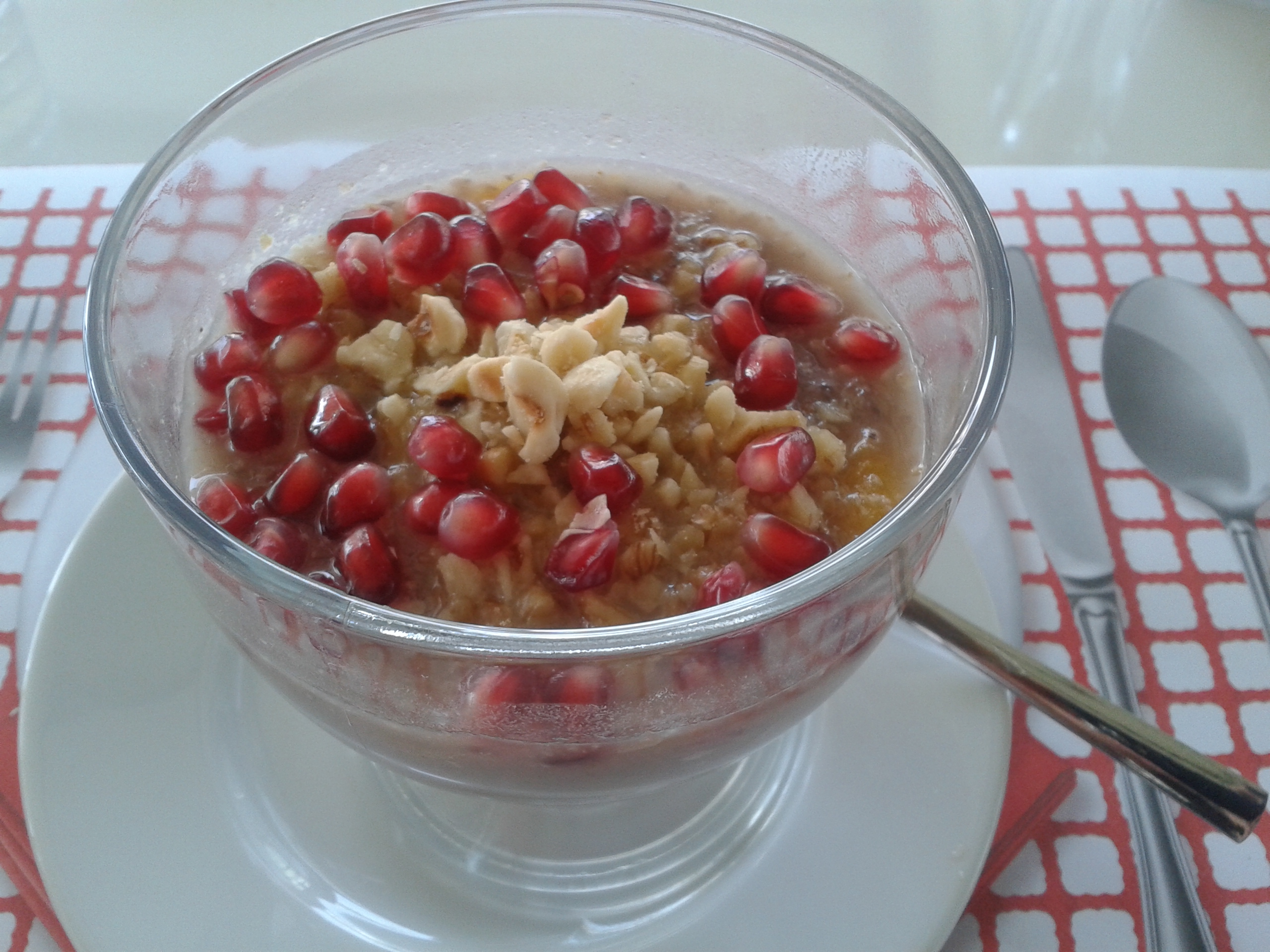
Ashure

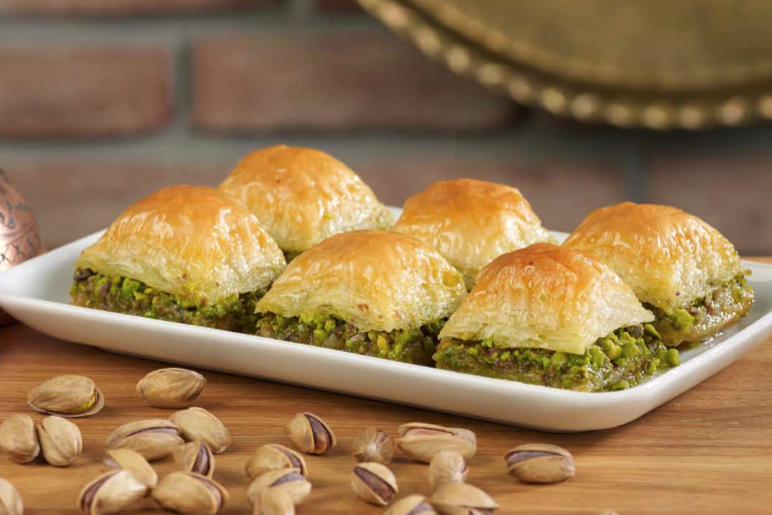
Baklava

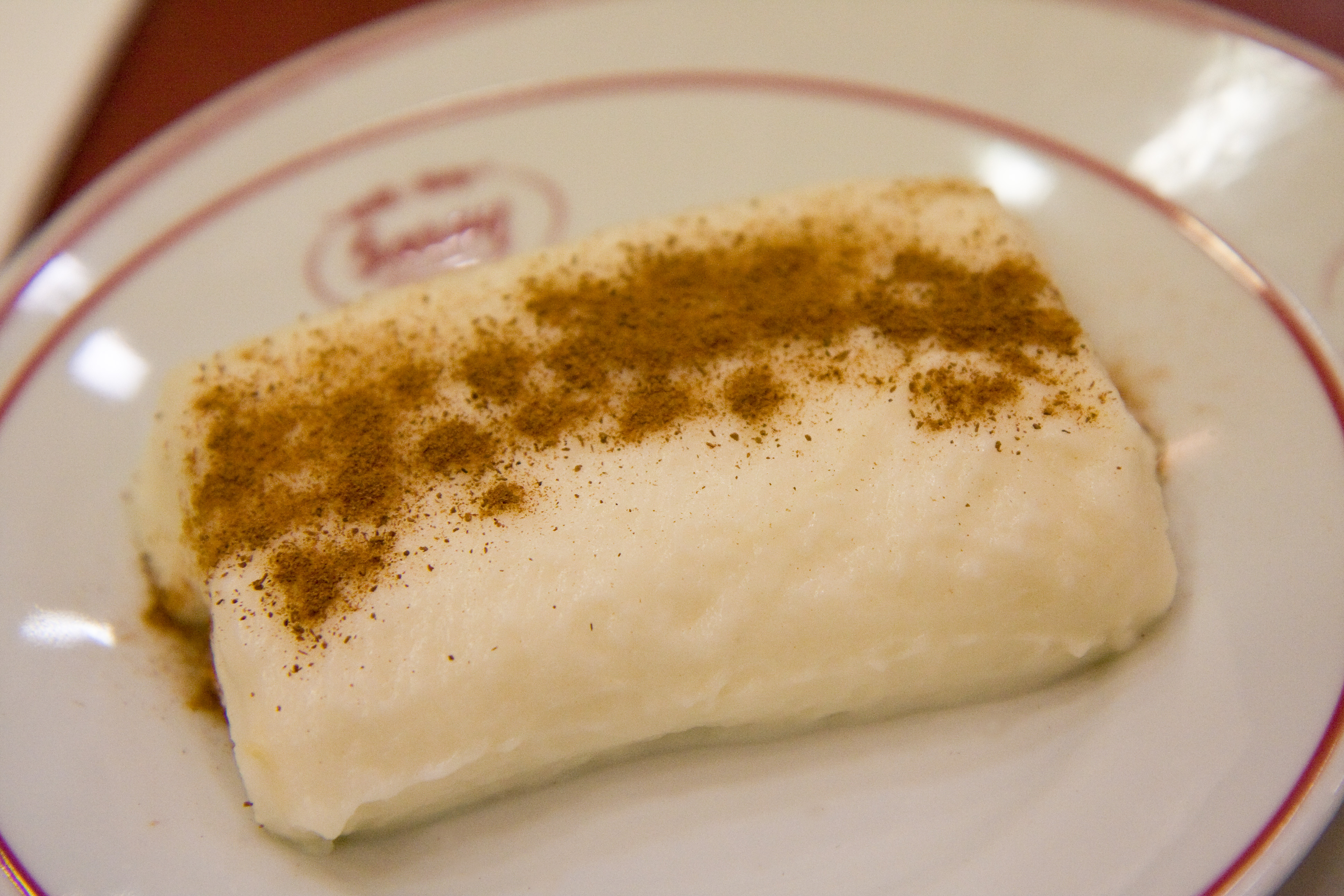
Tavuk göğsü

Sugar was still prohibitively costly in the 17th century; far more common were honey and syrups like pekmez, made with grapes.

The wheat berry pudding aşure, in modern times a part of the Islamic holy day Ashura, has roots in the harvest rituals of the Neolithic period, since which time domesticated wheat is known to have been cultivated at Karaca Dağ.

There are multiple competing theories of the origin of baklava, variously ascribing it to the Ancient Roman placenta cake, Persian lauzinaj or the influence of Central Asian desserts, found also in the milky layered dessert güllaç. Dernschwam describes a baklava-like dish made by cooking thin wafers of starch flour and egg white, then filling with layers of sugared nuts with rosewater and nutmeg to create a dessert about as thick as a finger.

Dernschwam describes zerde as rice pudding that is cooked in honeyed water and colored with saffron, garnished with toasted almonds and served with fruits. Muhallebi is also listed among the foods Dernschwam encountered on his travels.

Visiting Europeans noted with interest the Ottoman manner of serving sweet dishes between other courses, instead of at the end of the meal as the custom was in France and other European countries. German army officer Helmuth von Moltke whilst serving in the Ottoman Empire noted the unusual presentation of courses with the sweet courses served between roasts and other savory dishes. Edward Lear's account of a banquet in Ottoman Albania similarly notes the unexpected order of courses, roast meats followed by honeyed pastries, fruits followed by shellfish, savory and salted meats and stews followed by chocolate, and so on, he says, innumerable courses were served in confounding permutations of sweet, sour and salty combinations.

=== Dolma ===
Dolma were made by stuffing whole fruits and vegetables, or by wrapping leaves around a filling, either minced meat or spiced pilaf.

Dernschwam described a stuffed vegetable dish of young gourds and aubergines (which he calls podliczschan), stuffed with cubed mutton and garlic filling, and served with yogurt. He also describes the dish called sarma as stuffed vine leaves cooked with lamb and sour plums.

=== Drinks ===
Coffeehouses developed first in the Ottoman Empire and spread to Italy, then across Europe. There were coffeehouses, sharbat shops and bozahanes around the port of Galata where imported coffee, sugar and other colonial goods arrived to Istanbul in the 18th century. Bozahanes were one of the most popular public hangouts in 15th- and 16th-century Bursa until overshadowed by the coffeehouses in the 17th centuries. These were lucrative businesses that generated tax revenue and rent.

Thomas Smith mentions boza in the 17th-century Epistola de moribus ac institutis Tucarum: "They also have other liquors peculiar to them of which I shall only mention Bozza made from millet."

=== Fish ===
Jean de Thévenot described the fish market of Galata in the 17th century:

The most beautiful fish market in the world is located on the marina, on a street where fish shops occupy both sides, offering large quantities of fish of all varieties...The Greeks run many taverns/cabarets in Galata, where they attract many rascals...

Anchovies were a favorite in the coastal city of Trabzon. One of the many dishes recorded by Evliya Çelebi in his Book of Travels (Seyahatnâme) is an anchovy dish from Trebizond. Cooked in a stoneware pan, the anchovies are arranged in rows and covered with a cinnamon and black pepper scented mixture of leeks, celery, parsley and onions. The vegetable and fish layers alternate to fill up the pan, and olive oil is poured over the top. Çelebi described the dish as "like congealed light, and one who eats it is full of light ... This fish is indeed a table from heaven".

=== Fruits, nuts and seeds ===
Many different fruits and nuts are recorded in the palace records. Pomegranates were sourced from villages around the Marmara Sea. Üsküdar's fields and meadows had been converted to vineyards by the end of the 16th century. Oranges were not introduced until the 18th century, tangerines even later. Bananas, pineapples and other tropical fruits are not mentioned in any known records from the 19th-century imperial kitchens.

Fruits were used to make sharbat and compotes. Sugar was too expensive for all but the wealthiest members of Ottoman society, and desserts, compotes and sharbat were more likely to be sweetened with dry fruits, molasses or honey. There were hundreds of shops in 17th-century Istanbul specializing in preparations of the Ottoman-style compote hoşaf, often taken at the end of a meal.

Cakes and bread with poppy seed filling had been consumed in Byzantium since Roman times, a tradition that continued under the Ottoman Turks, entering Central European cuisine and the related culinary culture of Ashkenazi Jews.

=== Meat dishes ===
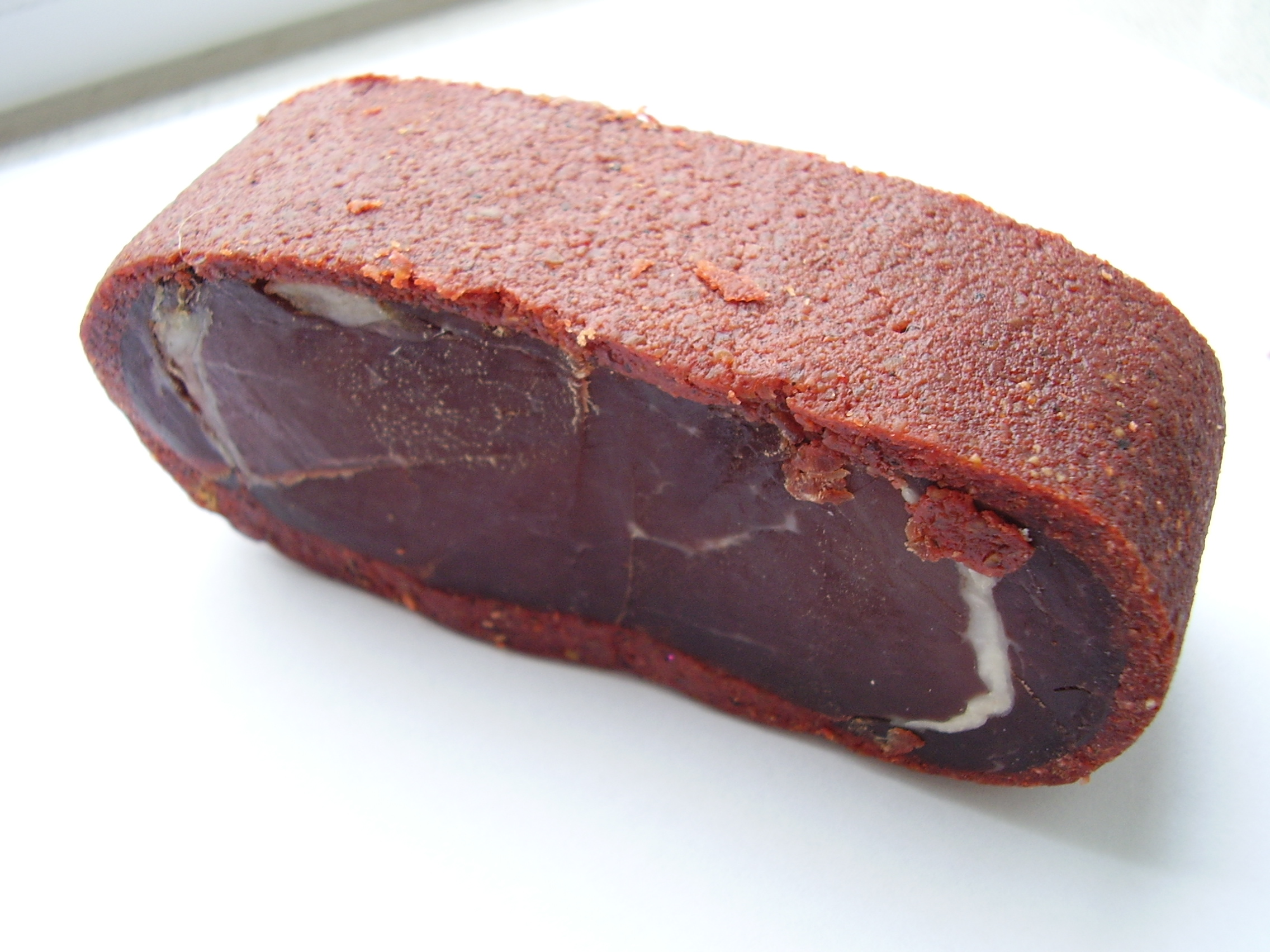
Pastırma

Kebabs, mantı, köfte, pastırma and yahni are types of meat dishes associated with Ottoman cuisine. Evliya Çelebi describes shish kebab on skewers and meat slow-cooked in tandoor ovens. He says there were hundreds of stalls in the city of Istanbul selling kebabs and kofta.

Ottoman kebabs were slow-cooked in their own juices in earthenware casseroles (çömlek) or tandoor ovens. The recipe named "as the Turk likes it" from Hungarian noblewoman Anna Bornemisza's collection uses this technique:

Sprinkle salt on the meat then roast it. Wash the rice well and boil it in water until soft. Wash the meat, place it in the pot and cover with beef or chicken juices. If you do not have these juices, boil it in melted butter, but so that it remains in one piece. When you serve it, turn it over onto a "platter", sprinkle with olive oil and a little sugar; in this way it will be tastier.

Stuffed roasted lamb with a filling of rice and raisins was served at a feast held in honor of Mahmud II's sons. It was a choice offering at the garden parties of Istanbul's elites. In 1719 stuffed lamb was served as a feast organized by the newly appointed governor of Mosul. The 13th-century Danishmendname describes whole stuffed lambs served at a wedding feast: Çevirme kuzıların dolmış içi.

Hunting for food was common. Sultan Ahmed I hunted rabbits at the palace in Üskudar. This style of hunt in gardens was practiced in Byzantine times at Blachernae Palace. The 19th-century hunting lodge Ihlamur Pavilion was designed by the Ottoman-Armenian architect Nikoğos Balyan in Istanbul for Sultan Abdulmejid I. Deer, wolves and foxes were all hunted, but rabbits were by far the most common game.

=== Offal ===
Ottoman court proceedings show that the boza peddlers claimed, by custom, exclusive rights to sell sauteed liver kebab (cığer).

=== Rice pilaf ===
Rice was mostly imported from Egypt and used to make pilaf. In the Ottoman language pilaf dishes were called dane, a term borrowed from the Persian language. Made with mulberries, stir-fried meats, honey, pomegranates and gourds, rice dishes were rich and varied, at least for the wealthy. Evliya Çelebi's description of rice dishes draws a distinction for the long-grain Persian rice used in dane dishes, which he calls çilav (چلو). He reports attending a feast in Bitlis where rice dishes were presented ambrette seeds, partridge, kofta and eggs. These festive platters were often enriched with almonds, pistachios and currants.

=== Soups and stews ===
Hans Dernschwam, a 16th-century German traveler, confirms that çorba (Ottoman Turkish: چوربا) was a common dish of this period, prepared with butter and rice for the janissary corps. According to Dernschwam, most 16th-century Ottoman soups began with a base of chicken stock and rice, with different vegetables added, although lamb stock was also used. Garlicky işkembe çorbası (tripe soup) was sold in the early morning hours by Ottoman Greeks as a hangover cure.

Soup could be thickened with a mixture of egg and flour or bread and an acidic ingredient such as lemon juice, and served over stale bread. This style of soup could be found, with some variations, in Balkan territories like Romania and Hungary, as well as in Turkey.

Hand-cut soup noodles called erişte are a basic dish found in Central Asian cuisine. Tutmaç and erişte are both mentioned in the 13th century Danishmendname.

=== Spices ===
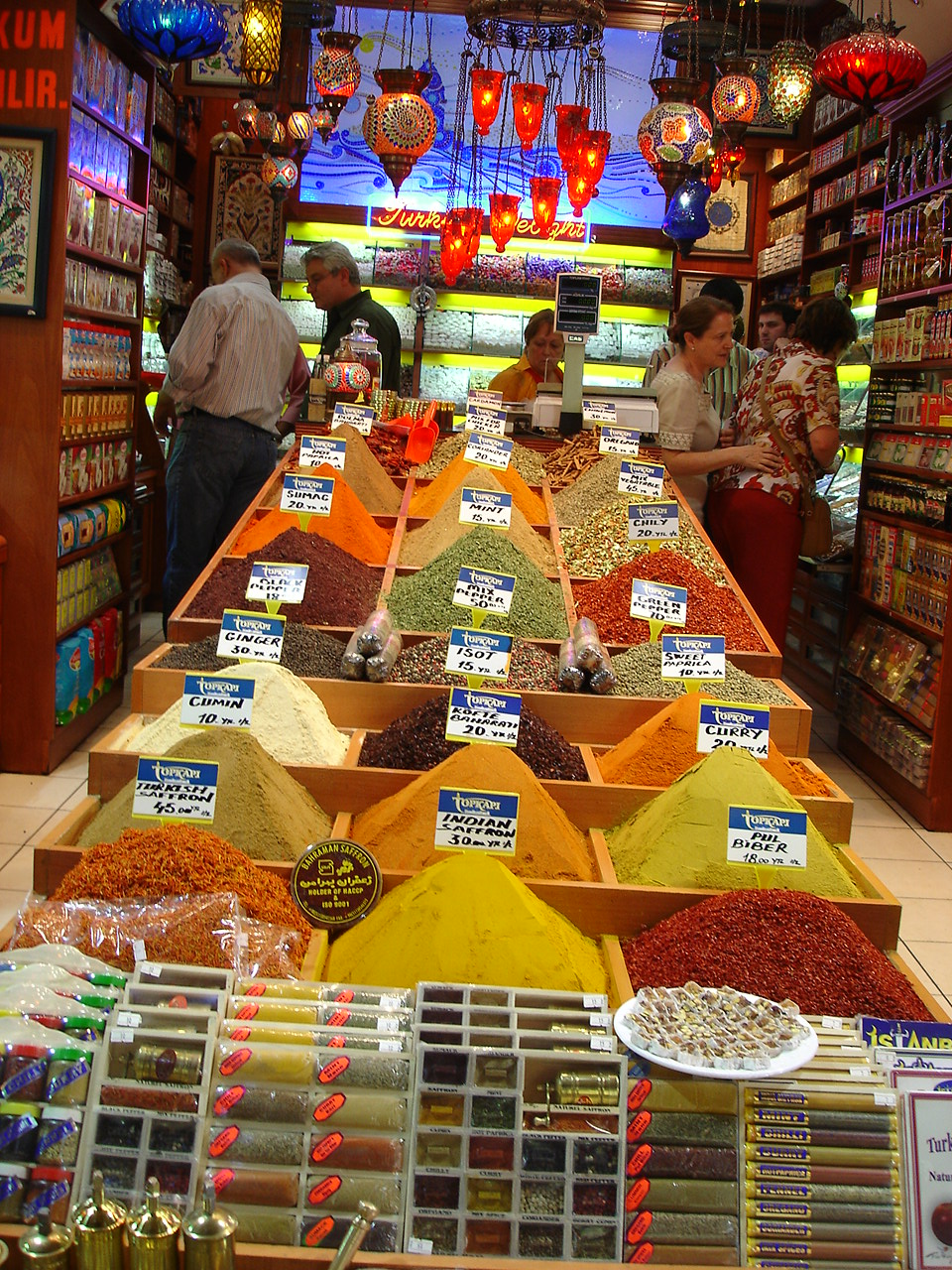
The Spice Bazaar

When Mehmed II took the city of Constantinople in 1453, the Turks gained control of the spice trade in the eastern Mediterranean. Spices were used in health tonics produced by the palace confectionery that could be consumed as sweets and for health purposes, and could include up to 60 different spices in their preparation.

According to Evliya Çelebi, the local melons in Diyarbekir were seasoned with cinnamon and cloves, according to the "recipe of Caliph Mu'awiya". The upper echelons of Ottoman society ate aniseed perfumed bread. Street vendors in Istanbul sold warm milk drinks sprinkled with fragrant cinnamon or ginger. Fish stews often included cinnamon, and kebabs could be spiced with cumin. Breads were made with seeds, cumin and spices either mixed into the dough or sprinkled on top.

A 17th-century report says that the used of spice in Istanbul was moderate and mostly limited to black pepper, but as the intensity of spice is subjective, other reports differ. The 16th-century Flemish herbalist and diplomat Ogier Ghiselin de Busbecq described the Ottoman culinary culture as "very frugal", with a simple meal of bread and salt, garlic or onion and yoghurt being all that was needed for nourishment. Lady Mary Wortley Montagu, writing in the 18th century, says Ottomans use "a great deal of rich spice", and that she was unable to eat the food as the intensity of flavors took their toll on her and she "began to grow weary of it and desired our own cook might add a dish or two after our manner".

=== Sweet and sour ===
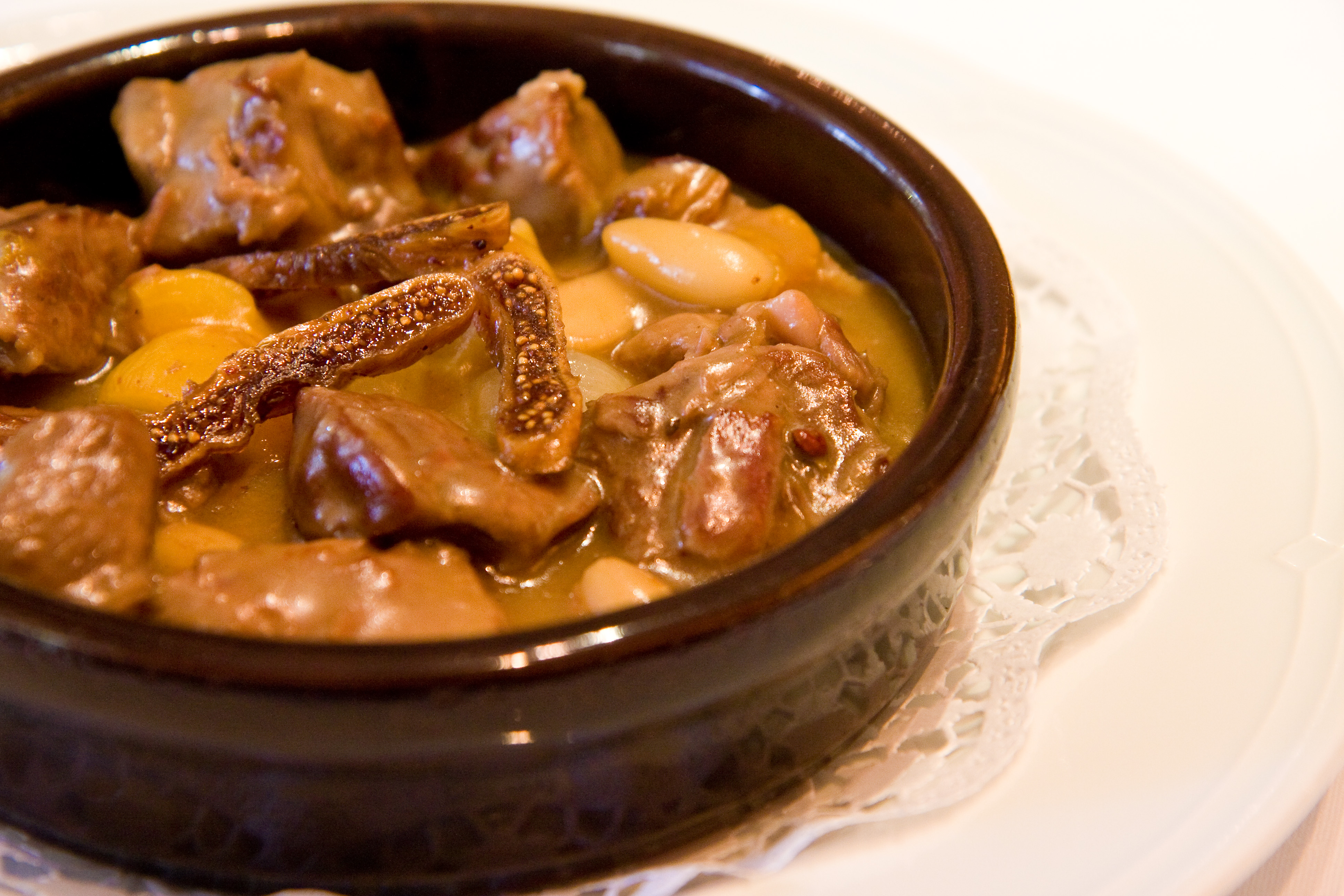
A serving of the sweet and sour lamb dish mutancana, prepared with dried figs and apricots

Sweet and sour dishes were typical of classical Ottoman cooking. The Turkish epic Danishmendname records "They put lots of fig and apricot in sour dishes, as well as raisins and dates."

The sweet and sour lamb dish mutancana is rumored to have been one of Mehmed II's favorite courses. The recipe survives in Shirvani's 15th-century manuscript, and some versions appear in Romanian cookbooks, most likely influenced by cultural contact with Hungary.

Mahmudiyye is a sweet and sour chicken and noodle dish of note from the Shirvani manuscript.

=== Vegetables ===
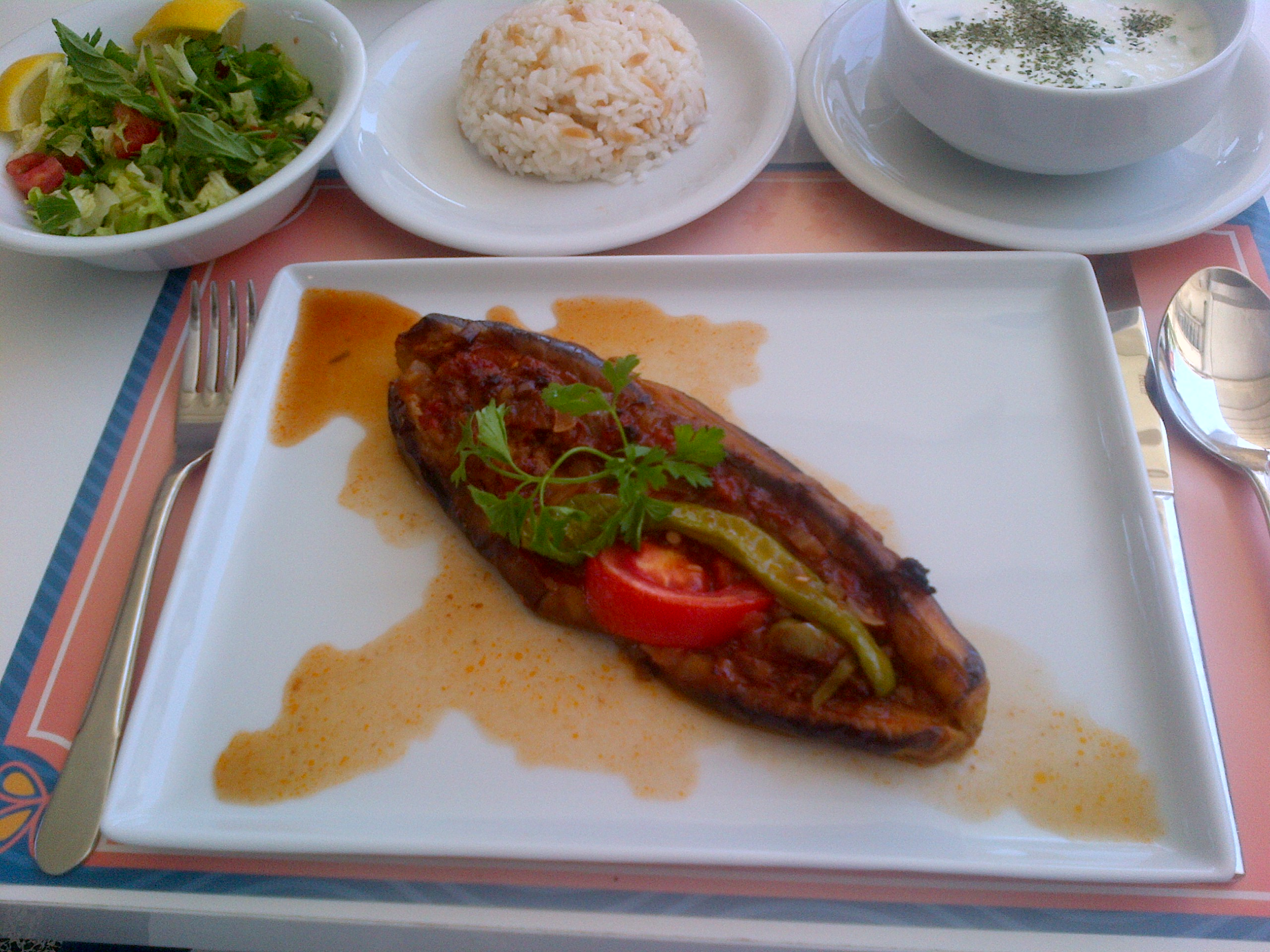
A modern example of the stuffed eggplant dish karnıyarık

Palace archives from the reign of Mehmed II confirm purchases of carrots, cucumbers, eggplants, parsley, spinach and chard in the late 15th century.

Leeks are native to the eastern Mediterranean and are mentioned in the Old Testament Numbers 11:15. Prasa (پراصه), as they were called, were a staple food for Salonican Jews who suffered economic hardship during the Capitulations of the Ottoman Empire.

Braising was a typical way of cooking vegetables in the 19th-century Ottoman Empire, sometimes with the addition of lamb. By the 1880s printed recipes had added tomato in the preparation of braised dishes. Vegetables were also used in the preparation of stuffed dolma.

=== Pickles ===
Dernschwam wrote that, while cabbage was found, the Turks did not know how to cook it with beef like the Hungarians, saying they instead pickled it, a common preparation in those days. Pickled cabbage was known as early as Byzantine times according to the description of a Byzantine feast recorded in Danishmendname.

== Palace cuisine ==
=== Background ===
Of the four Ottoman Imperial palaces -- Edirne Palace, Topkapı Palace, Dolmabahçe Palace and Yıldız Palace -- it is Topkapı that for 400-years oversaw the development of the classical Ottoman palace cuisine. Topkapı could host up to 4,000 persons at a time and the kitchen staff was huge. At one 18th-century event at least 1,000 chefs were required to prepare a meal of pilaf, soup and zerde for 10,000 attendant janissaries.

Ottoman palace cuisine was amalgamated and honed in the imperial palace's kitchens by chefs brought from certain parts of the empire to create and experiment with different ingredients. These chefs were tested and hired by their method of cooking rice, a simple dish. They were brought over from various places for the express purpose of experimenting with exotic textures and ingredients and inventing new dishes.

Each cook specialized in specific tasks. All dishes intended for the sultan were first passed by the palate of the chesnidjibashi, or imperial food taster, who tested the food for both poison and taste. The creations of the Ottoman palace's kitchens also filtered to the common population, for instance through Ramadan events, and through the cooking at the houses (yalis) of the pashas, and from there on to the people at large.

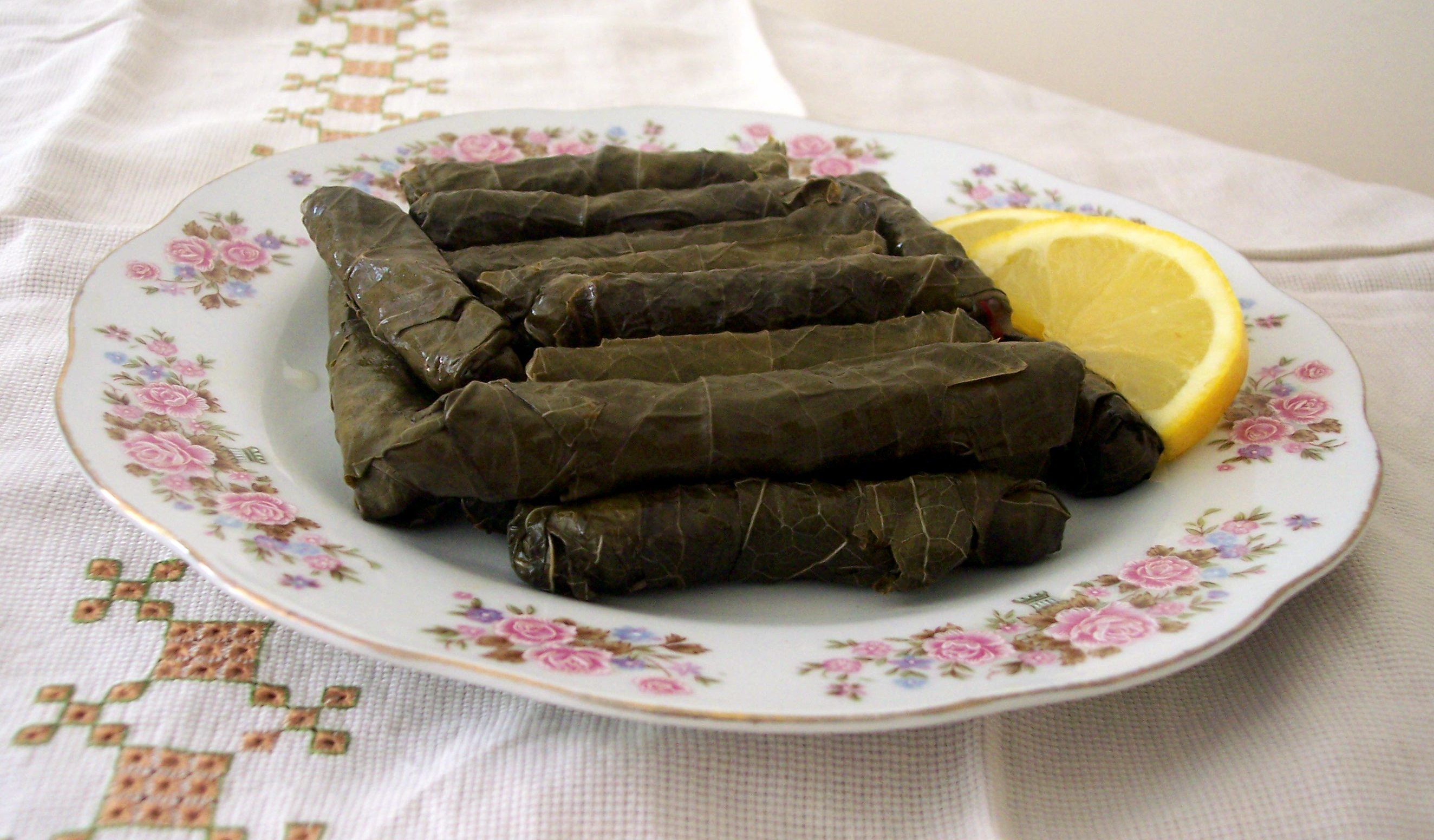
Sarma from Turkey

Clarified butter was the favorite cooking fat of the Ottoman palace. Butter was used for pilafs, sweet pastries, savory börek, and other dishes. Olive oil, although used in the palace cooking since the time of Fatih Sultan Mehmet, was used mostly for lighting lamps and in the manufacture of soaps. Its use in cuisine was limited, but included stuffed vegetables (dolma), İmam bayıldı, Karnıyarık and pilaki.

Majun, compote and halva were sweets made by palace chefs.

=== 17th century ===
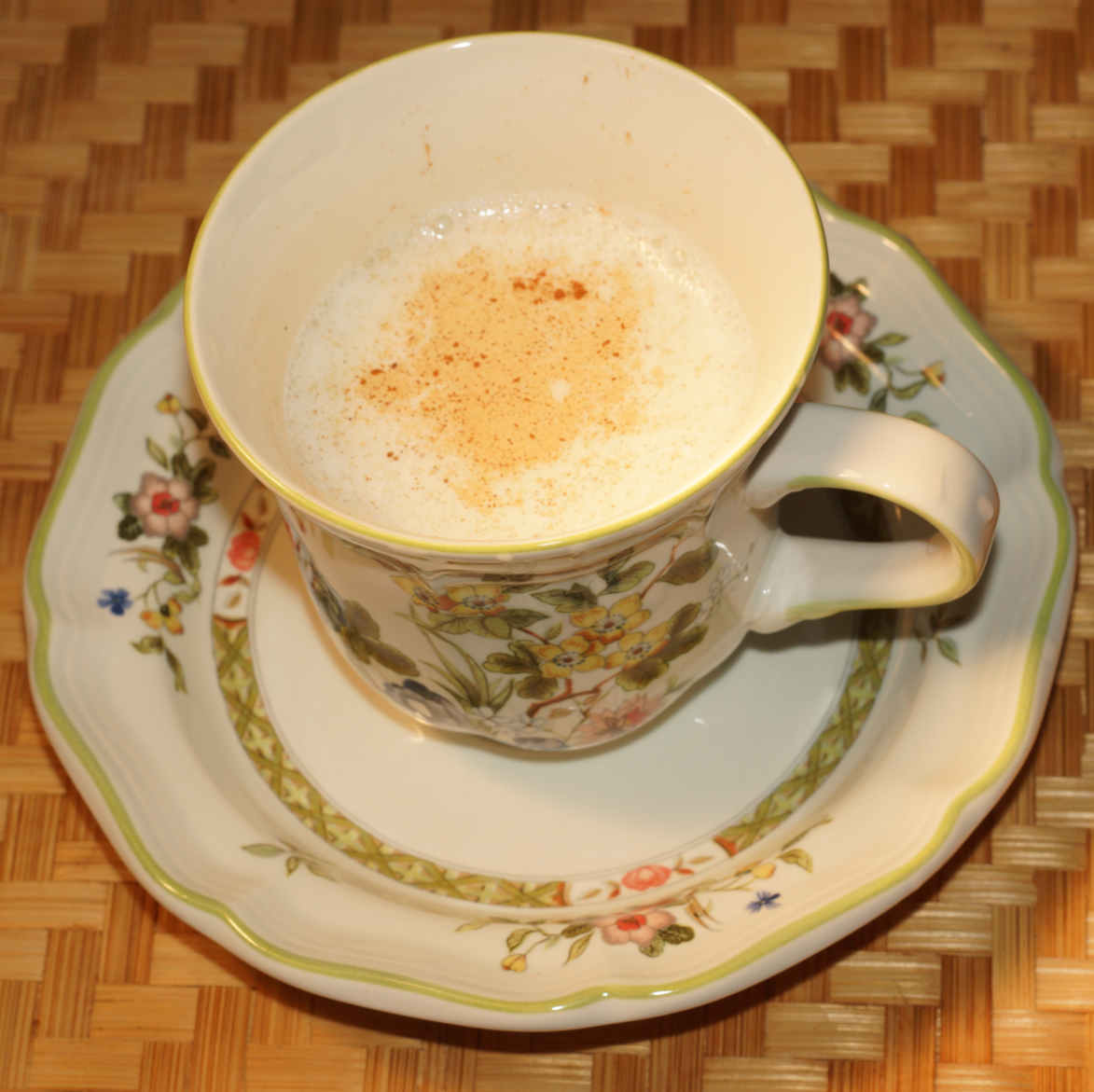
Salep is a drink made from the tubers of certain orchids belonging to the genus Orchis

A palace register from 1692 lists different kinds of vegetables eaten in the palace, squash (kabak-ı Mısır), celery, lettuce (marul), cucumber, garlic, aubergines, borage (lisan-ı seveir), cowpeas, spinach, turnips, vine leaves, Jew's mallow (müluhiye), beets, carrots and okra. Parsley, dill, mint, and tarragon are also listed among the foodstuffs allocated for the sultan. Green tomatoes (kavata) are listed for the hasseki sultan (the sultan's favorite concubine), who also received snow for iced coffee and to cool sharbat and hoşab. Chicken was reserved for the elite, and pigeon only for the sultan, hasseki, other potential concubines and princesses. Some large portions allotted to non-imperial high-ranking servants like the female steward of the harem, who received one sheep and 10 chickens per day, indicate that persons in these roles were responsible for feeding their subordinates.

Salep is a drink made from the tubers of the orchid also consumed in this era.

=== 18th century ===
Pepper and cinnamon were the dominant spices of the 18th-century Ottoman court, used in huge quantities, such as 118 kg (260 lb) of pepper and over 1 kg (2.2 lb) of mastic for a 15-day festival attended by various dignitaries in 1720. Black pepper was immensely popular in early modern European cuisine, and was used in nearly all Ottoman dishes.

=== 19th century ===
Mutton, clarified butter, flour and rice were the most common ingredients in the 19th-century palace cuisine. Butter and yogurt, made with milk from Egyptian and Dutch cows, were purchased from the Üsküdar and Eyüp markets. The most common cheeses were kaşar, kaşkaval, tulum peyniri and beyaz peynir. Typical spices included cinnamon, clove, saffron, cumin, sumac, nutmeg, oregano, mastic, cardamom and black pepper.

Compared with earlier centuries, more fish, roe and caviar were consumed, including the pickled bonito dish called lakerda. Roe and Beluga caviar were even served for the iftar meal during Ramadan. Offal meats were more common than lamb meat, which was a seasonal luxury item. More common were tripe, liver and trotters. Beef was only used in the production of pastırma and sucuk.

Starch was used to make the dessert güllaç during the month of Ramadan.

Nineteenth-century banquets served a mix of alaturca and alafranga dishes. At an 1856 banquet celebrating Ottoman victory in the Crimean War, the alaturca dishes were savory börek pastry, pilaf and the desserts kadayıf and baklava. Some of the dishes given French names were new creations of the palace kitchens like croustade d'ananas en sultane and suprême de faisan à la Circassienne.

=== Dishes ===
- Roasted pigeon
- Ayva dolma and kalye (vegetable—or fruit as in this case—cooked without meat, with olive oil and tomato salça after a short sautéing)
- Kavun dolması (stuffed melon)
- Piyaziye

==== İmam bayıldı ====
İmam bayıldı is an iconic eggplant dish with legendary folk origins. It was a dish created in the imperial kitchens that remains a popular entrée of modern Turkish cuisine.

==== Aish as-Saraya ====
The dessert Aish as-Saraya (Arabic: عيش السرايا, lit. 'Bread of the royal court') is said to have originated from Ottoman palaces, the word saraya being of Turkish origin meaning "palace".

== Public kitchens ==
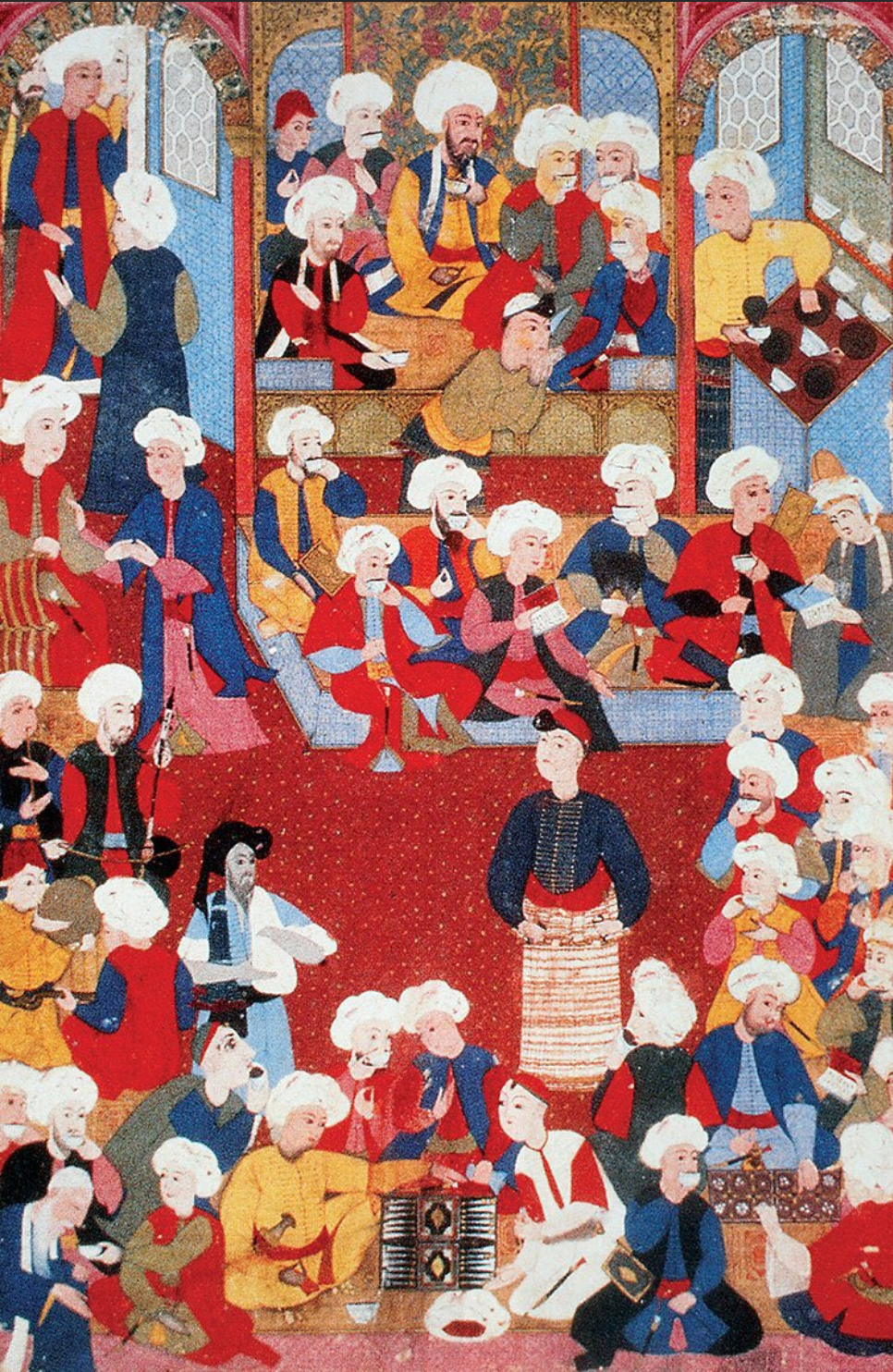
Ottoman miniature of a meddah performing at a coffeehouse

=== Hebron ===
The "Table of Abraham" (simat al-Khalil) was a custom of pre-Ottoman Hebron to host and feed travelers. According to Nasir Khusraw, any guest to Hebron received a bowl of lentils with olive oil, and a round loaf of bread and raisins. The simat in Hebron, reinstated by the Mamluk sultan Qaytbay in the 15th century, was still serving lentils each day in the 16th century. On Thursday evenings pomegranate seeds and seasoned rice (ruzz mufalfal) were served. According to Mujir al-Din, all were welcome at the simat al-Khalil. Evliya Çelebi, writing in the 17th century, said "each person had his bowl filled with the soup of Abraham, enough for the subsistence of men with their families. I [Evliya] was also fortunately among the group of those poor. I received a plate of wheat soup, a gift from God. I never witness such a tasty meal at the table of either viziers or men of learning".

=== Jerusalem ===
At the Haseki Sultan Imaret in Jerusalem guests received two bowls of soup each day, enriched with clarified butter, and including legumes, grains, root vegetables and other seasonal ingredients, and always served with bread. On Fridays, and for special occasions like iftar, Eid celebrations and other holy days like Aşure, Mevlud and Berat, lamb and rice would be served instead of soup, and zerde (rice pudding with honey and saffron).

=== Istanbul ===
All travelers were welcome to three days of basic meals at the imaret in Fatih, İstanbul, but the special service of bread, honey and sweets upon arrival was limited to guests of the caravansarai (roadside inn). Two soups were served each day, rice soup in the mornings, and wheat soup in the evenings, similar to the Jerusalem kitchens, but with meat and fresh parsley. The Friday menu was lamb with rice, zerde, and zırbaç (a dessert puddings with dried fruits and nuts). The highest ranking guests ate lamb and rice every day. When members of the ashraf were in attendance, they were served sheep's trotters (paça) for breakfast each day, with hearty lamb and rice portions, and a spiced squash dish sweetened with honey, cloves and cinnamon. 3,300 loaves of bread were baked each day by the kitchens and leftovers distributed to the poor.

== Terminology ==
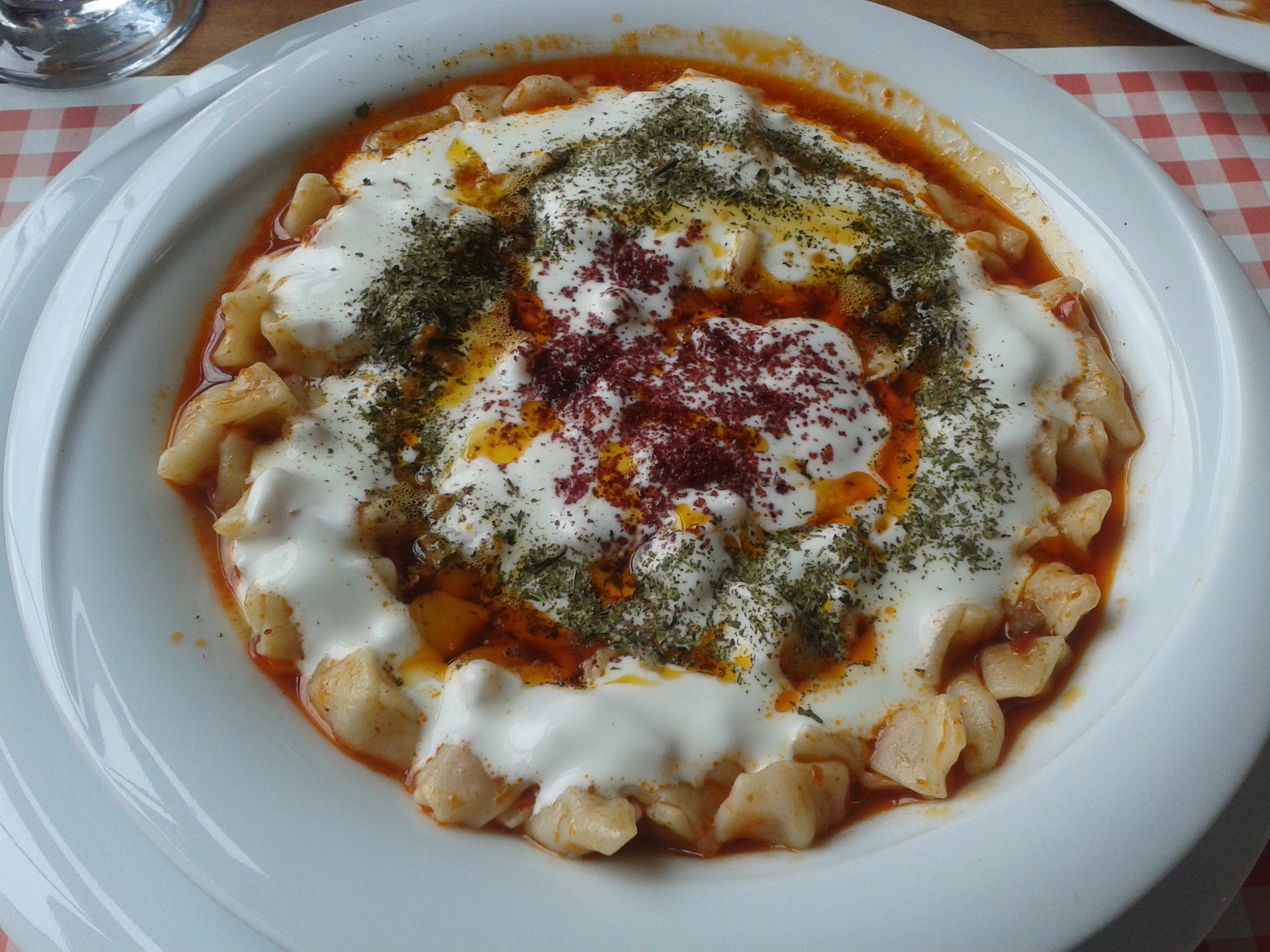
Manti of Kayseri

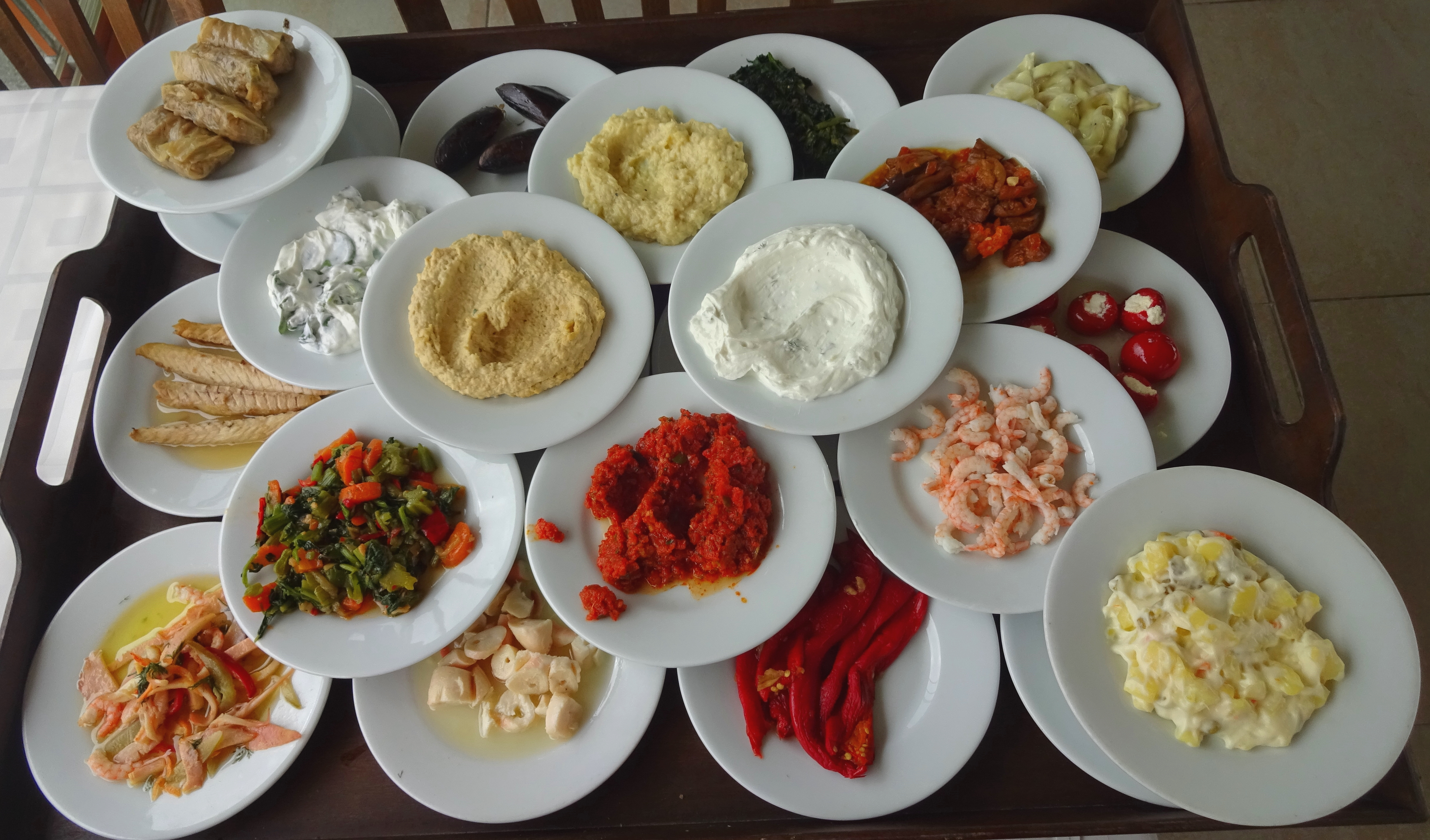
Meze from Turkey

The culinary terminology of Ottoman Turkish includes many Persian loanwords:

- Meze
- Çorba
- Hoşaf
- Reçel
- Pilaf

Other culinary terms that have entered the Turkish language reveal an assortment of linguistic influences like Italian (barbunya), Greek (fasulye), Chinese (manti) and Arabic (muhallebi).

Beginning in the 19th century, the Ottomans began using French culinary terms at diplomatic events. French cuisine was considered, in those times, the epitome of culinary accomplishment and its influence was felt not only in the Ottoman court, but also other European courts, where French chef Marie-Antoine Carême cooked in the imperial kitchens of the Russian Empire, and Alphonse Gouffe was Head Pastry Chef to Queen Victoria. Banquet menus for international dignitaries were written in French and service à la russe replaced service à la française at formal dinners. Ottoman pilaf, börek and kebabs continued to be served. Food remained a symbol of Ottoman power and prestige and the adaptation of French culinary practices to Ottoman palace cuisine reflected the Ottoman desire to prove themselves the cultural equal of Europeans.

Menus of formal banquets at the imperial court dating to the early 20th century show the use of French terms and their Turkish equivalents:

French	Turkish	English
Consommé	Et suyu	Meat stock
Consommé à la Reine	Et suyu	Meat stock (Chicken consommé thickened with tapioca)
Consommé de volaille glacé	Soğuk tavuk suyu	Cold chicken consommé
Créme de fruits	Kaymaklı meyve tatlısı	Fruits with clotted cream
Fraises voilées	Kaymaklı çilek	Strawberries with clotted cream
Gâteux aux fruits	Meyveli pasta	Fruitcake
Gâteux aux amandes	Bademli pasta	Almond cake
Gâteux Marquise	Çikolata tatlısı	Chocolate Marquise cake
Gâteux panaché	Yemişli bademli pasta	Ice-cream cake with fruits
Dessert	Şekerleme (candies)	Dessert
Gaufrettes Sultanié	Kaymaklı yaprak tatlısı	Sultan's waffles
Glace	Dondurma	Ice cream
Glace aveline	Dondurma	(Hazelnut) ice cream
Granité glacé aux fraises	Çilekli dondurma	Strawberry sorbet
Mont Blanc		Mont Blanc pastry
Neige d'Ananas	Ananaslı dondurma	Pineapple sorbet
Tarte à la Chambord	Şambor tatlısı	Chambord dessert tart
Vacherin Chantilly	Kremalı tatlı	Meringue dessert

== Legacy ==
Ottoman culinary influence survived the dissolution of the Ottoman Empire in Mesopotamia, the Levant, Balkans, Anatolia and Greece. Albanian, Greek, Romanian, Serbian, Bulgarian, Macedonian and Bosnian cuisine all share in the heritage of Ottoman culinary culture. Fragner notes that these cuisines, in the modern forms, "offer treacherous circumstantial evidence of this fact" of their shared cultural history, and that the origins of its legacy are impossible to ascertain:

It is a matter of mere speculation whether the origins of this imperial culinary legacy are to be traced back to Greek antiquity, the Byzantine heritage, or the Turkish and Arab nations, not forgetting Phoenician traditions; nowadays you may find support for any of these claims in various countries in the Balkans and the Near East.

The collapse of the Ottoman Empire gave rise to the creation of modern nation-states in the Balkans and Middle East. Nationalist ideologies became the tools to forge integrated, shared identities by erasing the shared Ottoman heritage and identity of these many nations. The newly founded states based their national identities on the ancient past (Pharonic, Mesopotamian, Phoenician, Greek). This has made the shared culinary heritage of these nations a flashpoint as competing nationalist agendas have fought over claims to the most prestigious dishes such as baklava. Fragner notes that the emergent national cuisines also represent "a good deal of local or regional culinary traditions".

== Bibliography ==
- Priscilla Mary Işın, Bountiful Empire: A History of Ottoman Cuisine, Reaktion Books, London, 2018, ISBN 9781780239040
- Marianna Yerasimos, 500 Years of Ottoman Cuisine, 2nd English edition, Boyut Publishing, İstanbul, 2007, ISBN 9789752301610
