= Pacificus of Verona =

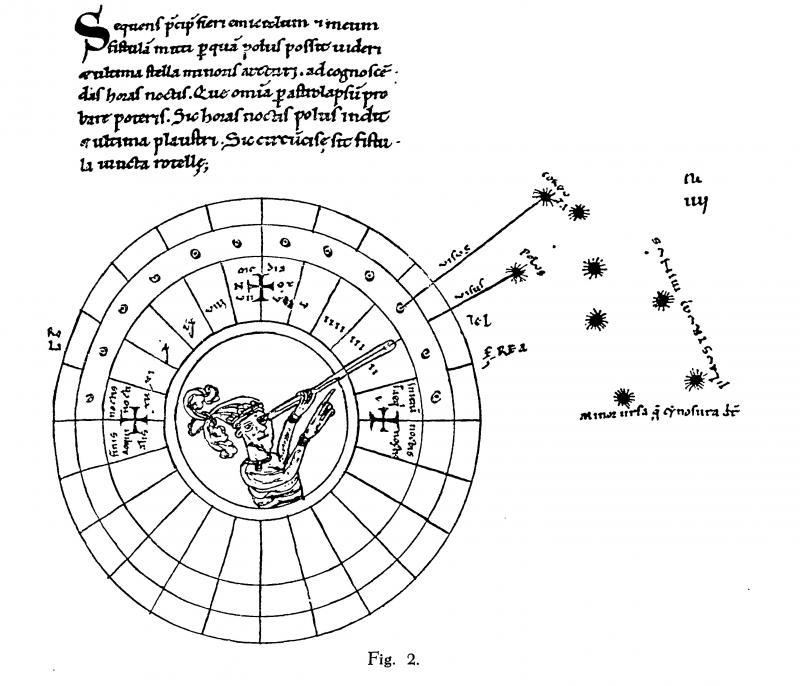
Pacificus' noctium horarum computrix, a tube and disk device for observing stars and counting the hours at night, as drawn in a 12th-century manuscript

Pacificus of Verona (Italian: Pacifico di Verona) (c. 776 – 23 November 844 AD) was a 9th-century Carolingian Italian religious leader, notable for his tenure as the archdeacon of Verona from 803 until his death in 844, as well as the historiographical debate over the validity of the many achievements ascribed to him.

During his time in Verona, Pacificus is said to have accomplished numerous feats, including composing or copying a large body of texts, founding or assisting in the establishment of several institutions in and around the city, and devising various inventions later attributed to him. His works were frequently cited and idealized by inhabitants of Verona throughout history, and his charters were often used as evidence in disputes concerning the authority of the city’s bishops and archdeacons. He was reportedly well educated in a wide range of subjects and has been regarded by some as an example of the Carolingian Uomo Universale. A street in Verona is named after him.

== Sources ==
Not much can be determined about Pacificus from contemporary documents, as few survive from his time. His existence is proved by at least one private document bearing his autograph signature from 809, as well as possibly a second similar document from 814. These documents relate to the properties held by the schola sacerdotum (a school for priests) he is credited with founding in Verona. There are several other charters or documents claimed to have been written or signed by Pacificus, but their authenticity is currently a matter of debate. In addition there are several marginalia believed to have been written by Pacificus on manuscripts from Church's Veronese archives, as well as numerous manuscripts attributed to him.

What other information available on his life comes from later sources, and there is some debate as to the reliability of the information they give us. These sources include two epitaphs in the Verona Cathedral which had long been thought contemporaneous to Pacificus, but which some now argue date from the cathedral's construction in the twelfth century, some 270 years after Pacificus' death. Other sources providing details from Pacificus' life include the fourteenth-century work Historiae Imperialis (Imperial History) by Giovanni de Matociis (commonly known as Giovanni Mansionario), and the 16th-century work Antiquitates Veronenses by the Augustinian monk Onuphrius Panvinius.

== Life ==
=== Early life and career ===
Little is known about Pacificus' early life. He was supposedly descended from noble stock, and was educated at the Abbey of Reichenau, known for it clerical school which produced clerks for many Imperial and ducal chanceries during the Carolingian period. When he returned to Verona he took charge of the Veronese cathedral chapter's school and scriptorium.

One of the few known events from his early life, when Pacificus was a deacon in Verona. The earliest account of this event comes from Panvinius' Antiquates Veronenses. In 798 Charlemagne decided to rebuild the city walls to protect the city against the threat of the Avar Khaganate. The cost of rebuilding the walls led to disputes between the clerical and civic authorities of the city over the burden of payment. The citizens demanded that the clergy pay one third of the cost, while the clergy insisted that they only need pay one quarter, as was customary. Without proof to support either side, it was decided to subject a representative of both sides to an ordeal by cross, and Pacificus was chosen to represent the clergy. Both parties stood against a cross holding their arms out while the Passion according to Matthew was read aloud. Pacificus held his arms upright through the entire reading while his opponent lowered his, leading the judge to rule that God favored Pacificus' side. Pacificus' victory was considered proof of an established custom afterwards, such as when Lothair planned to restore the city walls, and the clergy of Verona only had to pay one quarter of the costs of restorations of the walls.

=== Archdeacon of Verona ===
Pacificus was promoted to the position of archdeacon of Verona most likely in 803, thought issues have been raised with this date. After this, there are two mutually exclusive accounts of his life, around which there is some debate. The long accepted version paints Pacificus as a pious, model clergyman, who was a staunch defender of his bishop Ratoldus, even going so far as to administer the diocese during Ratoldus' absence from 834-840, until his death in 844.

As archdeacon, Pacificus was known for his active role in administering and establishing institutions in the city. He was reportedly the founder of the city's schola sacerdotum at the beginning of the ninth century, which he later made directly subject to the Patriarch of Aquileia. He is described as participating in writing a document from June 813 with Bishop Ratoldus which grants the schola an independent income, and later arguing that the schola was independent from the authority of the bishop. He also is credited with donating the land upon which the schola's church was built, which was used as an argument that it remained outside the authority of the bishop. Pacificus was also supposedly involved with the building or renovating of a number of other churches throughout the area, including the Basilica of St Zeno. He also was responsible in his will for donating his house for the establishment of a xenodochium, an institute which took care of the poor and sick, and the distributions of alms. This generosity was used by later archdeacons as a model for behavior and duties.

Pacificus is credited in his epitaph with having copied 218 books on a variety of subjects, including liturgical texts, poetry, and glossa on various texts. He also kept up a wide correspondence with other clerical figures of the time, including exchanging various texts. He was supposedly fluent in Hebrew and Greek as well as Latin, and was very well read. In the church's Veronese archives there are marginalia and notes attributed to Pacificus on texts such as the Sapiential Books, Psalms, and the Rule of St Benedict. He also was responsible for copying and restoring a number of other texts in the chapter's possession, and notes and corrections believed to be in Pacificus' hand are found on copies of texts by St Augustine, Pope Gregory the Great, Sulpicius Severus and St Jerome. Pacificus was also credited with the composition of the second of his two epitaphs for some time, until it was noted that the text was in fact an adaptation of the epitaph of Alcuin of York.

=== Pacificus the Inventor ===
In addition to his religious compositions, Pacificus is also credited with the writing of several pieces on secular knowledge, including a book on astronomy. He is also credited with the invention of several devices, including a means to throw flames from ships, but his most famous invention is his clock. On his epitaph, he is credited with the creation of a "nocturnal clock" (horologium nocturmum). This was long believed to be the first mechanical clock, or Water clock, a fact repeated in numerous sources even up to the present day. In medieval texts and illustrations however, it is shown that his "clock" was in fact an observation tube with crosshairs, accompanied by an argumentum, a text containing instructions on how to interpret the observations, and it was intended to be used not just so that monks could determine the hour of night, but also for calendrical purposes. The first of such medieval descriptions is the same poem by Pacificus, published as rhythmus 116 by K. Strecker in M.G.H. "Poetae" IV/2, and followed by rhythmus 117, "Carmen sperae caeli", a praise of the Christian zodiac, signed by the author himself with the same formula (Hirenicus humilis levita) found in the ms. Paris 1924 in a folio written, according to Campana, by Pacificus himself. Another poetical text on computus, rhythmus "Anni domini notantur", has been also attributed to Pacificus.

== Doubts and Criticisms ==
The life and accomplishments of Pacificus of Verona has recently come under fire, most prominently by the Italian medievalist Cristina La Rocca. La Rocca makes an argument that much of what is attributed to Pacificus is in fact a fabrication constructed by later medieval writers to support their own arguments. La Rocca argues that Pacificus, while still real and holding the position of archdeacon of Verona for some time, was not the illustrious, well-educated and charitable author, inventor and architect he is purported to be. La Rocca notes that Pacificus, along with the rest of the cathedral chapter, likely sided with King Bernard of Italy during his rebellion against his uncle, Emperor Louis the Pious, of whom the Veronese Bishop Ratoldus was a staunch supporter. According to La Rocca, this rivalry between Pacificus the Archdeacon and Ratoldus the Bishop likely ended with Pacificus' banishment following the failure of Bernard's rebellion, a fact supported by the fact that a monk named Pacificus (a relatively rare name) appears in the records of the Abbey of Nonantola in 826. If Pacificus was banished, it is likely that he remained in Nonantola until his death.

La Rocca's arguments hinge upon the fact that there are few documents about Pacificus that can be proven to have been written from his lifetime. She admits the two documents relating to the establishment of the schola as legitimate, and little else. The epitaphs in the Verona cathedral, which had long been thought contemporaneous to Pacificus, she argues in fact date from the construction of the cathedral in the twelfth century. She argues that it was during the tenure of Theobald as archdeacon of Verona (1120-1135), who was the first bishop to be appointed from the ranks of the cathedral chapter (1135-1157), that Pacificus' name first appeared in reference to many documents related to the cathedral chapter's history and the founding of the schola and xenodochium. She argues that these documents were created to strengthen the chapter's claims to a number of churches and other properties in Verona, by constructing the story around Pacificus to illustrate the chapter's Carolingian roots and traditions in an attempt to support its claims of autonomy from the bishop of Verona and protect the chapter from the reforms within the church at the time. One of the items constructed during this period, according to La Rocca, is the epitaphs, or at least the first one, which were mounted in the Verona Cathedral, where they were publicly visible, to support their claims surrounding Pacificus and have him serve as a model of the duties of an archdeacon. She argues that it is based on this epitaph that much of the later work written about Pacificus is based upon, with later additions to his story being similarly constructed to serve the purposes of the present by moving the argument into the past, such as Panvinius' account of the trial surrounding the payment for the reconstruction of the city's walls being fabricated to underscore an argument the clergy of Verona were having at the time with the Venetian Republic's tax assessment of the church.

La Rocca was not the first to raise issues regarding the epitaphs, however, as there was much debate in the seventeenth and eighteenth centuries over their provenance. Issues were raised regarding the date of their construction, their original location within the cathedral as well as that of Pacificus' tomb, and surrounding the dates mentioned for when Pacificus served as archdeacon. It was noted that the two epitaphs contained conflicting dates as to his death, and that the years listed for Pacificus archdeaconship conflicted with established facts regarding the dates during which Lothair was King of Italy, the fact that the first epitaph specifically names the day (Sunday) and month in which he died despite the fact that the day he supposedly died did not fall on a Sunday in the year mentioned, as well as the existence of separate documents listing different archdeacons in Verona during the years he was supposedly in office, Tisus in 806 and Audo in 845. The documents used to justify the chapter's exemptions were also challenged prior to La Rocca, and were eventually declared to be forgeries by an investigation instigated by Benedict XIV in 1756.

While La Rocca has raised a number of questions about the veracity of the claims surrounding Pacificus of Verona, her arguments are not entirely accepted among medieval scholars. Some scholars accept the conclusions she has reached, such as Nicholas Everett, who in his 2003 book Literacy in Lombard Italy describes "... the more famous examples of marginalia attributed to Bishop Pacificus [sic] and his schola sacerdotum, both of which appear to belong more to the realm of myth than history." However there are also those who do not accept her version of Pacificus' history, such as the late Donald A. Bullough, who in his 2004 book Alcuin, Achievement and Reputation, stated "The elaborate attempt by C. La Rocca ... to impugn the authenticity of the epitaphs and their evidence for Pacificus' life and career has not persuaded me or others." Specialists of Carolingian poetry, such as Gabriel Silagi, Gian Paolo Marchi, Grazia Di Pasquale, Francesco Stella disputed some aspects of La Rocca's reconstruction and called attention to the poetical, exegetical and epistolary works of Pacificus which have been overlooked in La Rocca's volume.
