= Piyaziye =

Dish from the Ottomans in the 15th century

- Type: Dolma
- Place of origin: Turkey
- Created by: Ottoman Cuisine

Piyaziye (Turkish: Piyaziye) (Persian: پیاز for "onion") are made of onion stuffed with meat (lamb) and rice. Piyaziye origins in 15th century Ottoman Empire.

== See also ==
- List of stuffed dishes
