= Roberto Weiss =

Italian-British scholar and historian

Professor Roberto Weiss
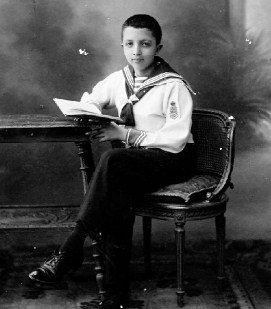
- Born: 22 January 1906; Milan
- Died: 10 August 1969 (aged 63); Reading
- Occupation: Professor
- Title: Count
- Spouse: Eve (née Cecil)
- Children: 1 boy, 3 girls

Academic background
- Education: Oxford University
- Thesis: Humanism in England during the Fifteenth Century up to 1485 (unpublished D.Phil. thesis, University of Oxford, 1938)
- Influences: John Buchan

Academic work
- Discipline: Historian
- Sub-discipline: Renaissance
- Institutions: University College London
- Main interests: Medals
- Notable works: Humanism in England during the Fifteenth Century, Renaissance Discovery of Classical Antiquity

Roberto Weiss (22 January 1906 – 10 August 1969) was an Italian-British scholar and historian who specialised in the fields of Italian-English cultural contacts during the period of the Renaissance, and of Renaissance humanism.

== Early career ==
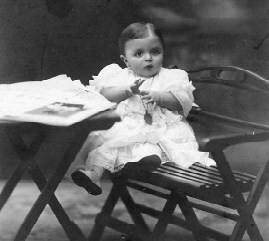
Roberto Weiss, c.1909

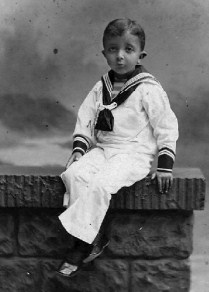
Roberto Weiss, c.1911

Weiss was born in Milan, Italy. After spending his later childhood in Rome, he came to Britain to study law at Oxford University. He worked for a short time from 1932 to 1933 in the Department of Western Manuscripts of the Bodleian Library, and obtained his D.Phil from Oxford in 1934, in the same year winning the Charles Oldham prize. He was naturalised British in 1934. The author John Buchan became his friend and mentor. He also met the novelist Barbara Pym, who later used him as the basis for the character Count Ricardo Bianco in her first novel, Some Tame Gazelle (1950), which she had begun writing while at Oxford. During World War II, between 1942 and 1945, he served in the British Royal Artillery in a non-combatant role.

== Scholarship ==
Roberto Weiss in Rome with his sister

Other than his period of military service, Weiss taught at University College London from 1938 until his death. He became Professor of Italian in 1946.

He was a pioneer in the study of early humanism. His first book (based on his thesis), Humanism in England during the Fifteenth Century (1941, subsequent editions: 1955, 1967, 2009) was the first full-length monograph in English to treat the subject of the pre-Tudor influence of Italian humanism on England. A reviewer from its first publication said that "young Weiss's meticulous scholarship had already long been recognised", and it was elsewhere described as "the best general guide" to its subject, and as the work in whose shadow other scholars remained seven decades later. The book was also criticised for adhering too much to Jacob Burckhardt. Subsequent lines of research took in Italian pre-humanists and the Renaissance knowledge of Greek. Weiss cited Rosamond Joscelyne Mitchell in this book, and she cited him in her book From Bristol to Rome in the Fifteenth Century.

His last book, the posthumously published The Renaissance Discovery of Classical Antiquity (1969) was an examination of the antiquarian studies of the renaissance humanists themselves, beginning with Petrarch and ending with the sack of Rome in 1527. He also made important contributions to the study of individual humanists.

Weiss was known for the conciseness of his writing. He stated that he could have turned each of the last ten chapters of The Renaissance Discovery of Classical Antiquity into its own book. His wife Eve, an English teacher, ensured the correctness of his English grammar and flow.

Shortly before his death he was awarded the Serena Medal for Italian Studies by the British Academy.

Weiss died on 10 August 1969 in Reading, Berkshire, having suffered a heart attack in the early hours of 9 August.

== Assessments ==
According to Weiss's obituary in The Times, the Italian department at UCL "developed into one of the most flourishing centres of Italian scholarship outside Italy" under his leadership. The Times also called him "a vital link in Anglo-Italian cultural relations". His obituary in the medievalist journal Speculum called him "one of the most learned and productive scholars of his generation". He has had a successful posthumous publishing career.

== Personal life ==
In 1936 Weiss married Eve Cecil, with whom he settled in Henley-on-Thames and had four children. He died in Reading, Berkshire.

== Published works (selection) ==
A bibliography of Weiss' works was published by Conor Francis Fahy and John D. Moores as "A list of the publications of Roberto Weiss, 1906–1969", in Italian Studies, vol. 29 (1974), pp. 1–11.

- Humanism in England during the Fifteenth Century (1941; 2nd ed. 1957, 3rd ed. 1967)
- The Dawn of Humanism in Italy (1947; Italian edition: Il Primo secolo dell'umanesimo, 1949), ISBN 0-8383-0080-4
- Un umanista veneziano: Papa Paulo II (1958)
- The Medals of Pope Sixtus IV (1471–1484) (1961)
- Pisanello's medallion of the Emperor John VIII Palaeologus (1966)
- Illustrium imagines: [incorporating an English translation of Nota] (1967), ISBN 0-934352-05-4
- The Renaissance Discovery of Classical Antiquity (1969), ISBN 0-631-11690-7
- Medieval and Humanist Greek : collected essays (1977)

== See also ==
- John Doget
- Hieronymus Balbus
- Giovanni Mansionario
