= Elçi Han =

Former inn in Istanbul, Turkey

- Turkish: Elçi Hanı
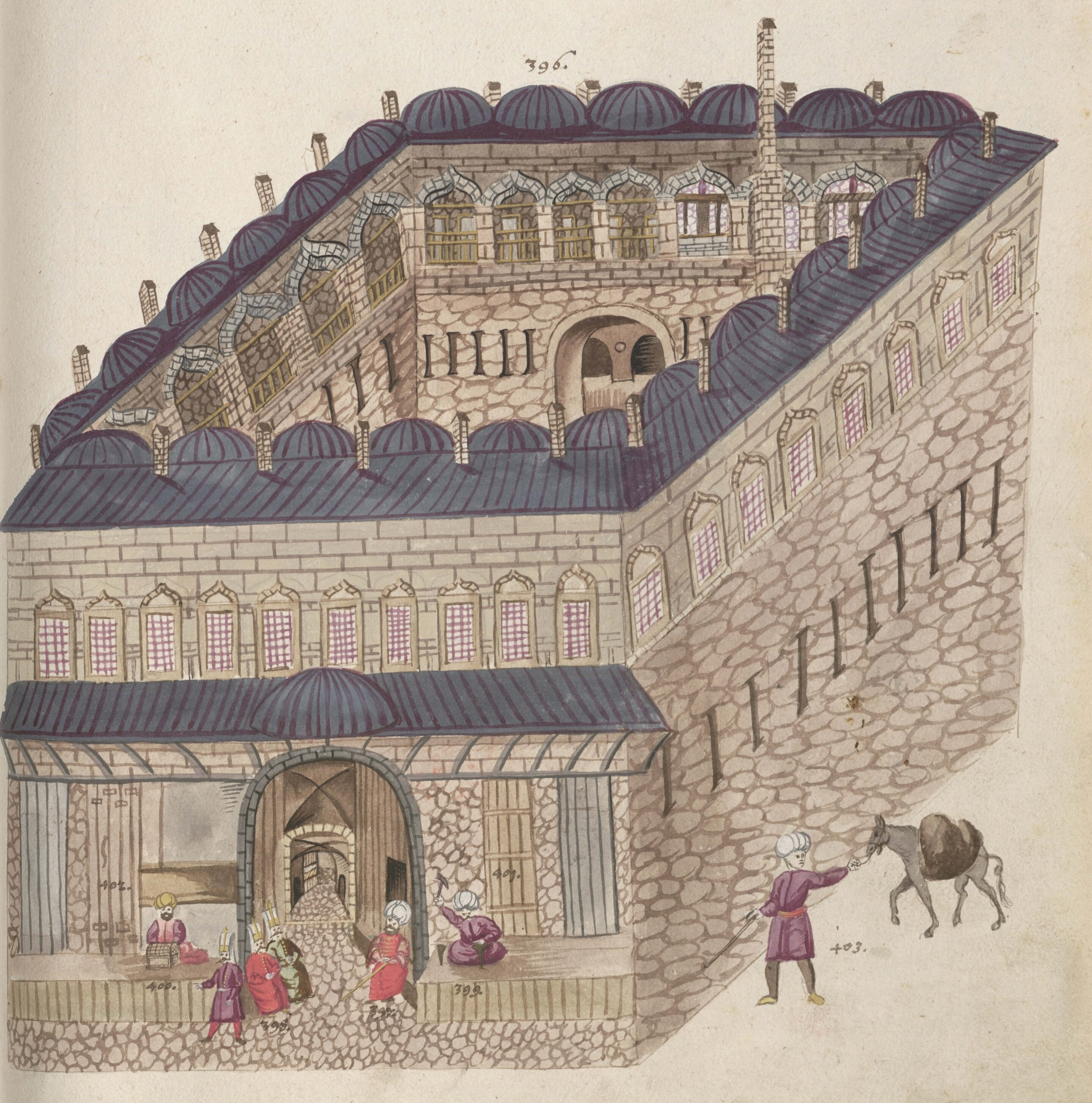
- c. 1586 depiction by Johannes Leunclavius.
- Interactive map of the Elçi Han area
- Alternative names: Ambassador's Inn

General information
- Type: Caravanserai
- Architectural style: Ottoman
- Location: Çemberlitaş, Fatih, Constantinople, Ottoman Empire (modern-day Istanbul, Turkey)
- Construction started: 1509
- Completed: 1511
- Client: Atik Ali Pasha

Elçi Han, literally the Ambassador's Inn, was a historical han (inn) in Constantinople, Ottoman Empire (modern-day Istanbul, Turkey).

== Erection ==
Elçi Han was originally constructed in the Çemberlitaş neighborhood as part of the Gazi Atik Ali Pasha Mosque and külliye (complex). The main components of the külliye were divided by the city's principal thoroughfare. Divanyolu (the modern Yeniçeriler Avenue): the mosque, mausoleum, imaret, and zaviye stood on the eastern side, while the madrasa and the han were erected directly opposite. Although modern historian İsmail Hakkı Uzunçarşılı suggested that the building was formerly the Venetian Balyos Han, this notion is considered incorrect, as Venetian baili (embassy) resided elsewhere.

The inn was built on the site of the ancient Forum of Constantine, known to have occupied the same location in the early 4th century. The nature of any structural transformations to the forum throughout the Byzantine period remains unclear. Some Western visitors recorded that a church, or possibly a monastic establishment, once stood on the site. In the 17th century, traveler Evliya Çelebi also described the building as of Byzantine origin, writing it was already in use for the same purpose in that period, and it was later rebuilt in Islamic style in 1456 as a charitable foundation of Ikbal Pasha. However, the han was not built in this year, as Evliya Çelebi suggested, but later, and its founder was Atik Ali Pasha, a vizier of Sultan Bayezid II (r. 1481–1512). It was not a converted Byzantine building, but a fully Ottoman structure erected atop unidentified vaulted remains, possibly remnants of the former forum.

A decree preserved in the Topkapı Palace Museum Archives confirms that the inn was commissioned by Atik Ali Pasha around 1510–11. Given Ali Pasha was killed in 1511, construction must have been advanced, even if not fully completed, before his death. The German traveler Hans Dernschwam, who stayed in the han between 1553 and 1555, also stated that its founder died in combat against "Persians". Ali Pasha appears to have built the han opposite his mosque, on the site of his residence, which was severely damaged in the 1509 earthquake, as an income-generating foundation.

== Bibliography ==
- Eyice, Semavi (1995). "Elçi Hanı". TDV Encyclopedia of Islam, Vol. 11 (Elbi̇stan – Eymi̇r) (in Turkish). Istanbul: Presidency of Religious Affairs, Centre for Islamic Studies. pp. 15–18. ISBN 978-975-389-438-8.
