= Hans Dernschwam =

German Bohemian traveler (1494–1568)

- Born: 23 March 1494; Brüx (modern-day Most, Czech Republic), Holy Roman Empire
- Died: 1568 (aged 73–74); Schattmannsdorf (modern-day Častá, Slovakia), Holy Roman Empire

Hans Dernschwam von Hradiczin (23 March 1494 – c. 1568) was a German Bohemian humanist, traveler, and chronicler known for his travels in the Ottoman Empire. Four years after graduating from the Leipzig University in 1510, he moved to Buda (Ofen) to join French humanist Hieronymus Balbus, a court tutor. Dernschwam moved to Pressburg and traveled across the Kingdom of Hungary and Transylvania, copying Roman inscriptions. After serving Anton Fugger, he joined the imperial embassy sent by the Holy Roman Emperor Ferdinand I (r. 1556–1564) to the Ottoman Sultan Suleiman the Magnificent (r. 1520–1566) in 1553. During his travels throughout the Ottoman realm that lasted two years, he documented the daily lives of the locals as well as the presence of many Germans, Austrians, and Hungarians in Anatolia. His life after his travels is largely unknown.

== Early life, education, and career ==
Dernschwam was born in Brüx (modern-day Most), Bohemia, on 23 March 1494. While his name appears in the 1507 register of the University of Vienna, he is known to have graduated from the Faculty of Philosophy at the Leipzig University on 5 September 1510.

According to a manuscript held at the Austrian National Library, Dernschwam moved to Buda (Ofen) in 1514 to join French humanist Hieronymus Balbus, a tutor at the Hungarian royal court. In 1515, he accompanied Balbus to Pressburg (Bratislava) and spent the following decade traveling across Hungary and Transylvania, where he copied Roman inscriptions he encountered. From 1525 onward, Dernschwam was in the service of Anton Fugger, a prominent Augsburg banker and patron of the arts. Dernschwam got married in 1538 in Schattmannsdorf (modern-day Častá, Slovakia).

== Travels ==
Around 1549, he left Fugger's employ and joined the imperial embassy sent by the Holy Roman Emperor Ferdinand I (r. 1556–64) to the Ottoman Sultan Suleiman the Magnificent (r. 1520–66) in 1553. Motivated by a personal desire to see Constantinople and learn about the Ottoman Empire, Dernschwam financed his own journey, as he stated in his travelogue.

The delegation departed Vienna on 22 June and arrived in Constantinople on 25 August 1553. However, the Sultan was on campaign near Nakhchivan, and the embassy had to wait over 18 months to be received. In March 1555, the group traveled to Amasya, where they finally met the Sultan in April. During their extended stay, Dernschwam witnessed key diplomatic events, including the arrival of an Iranian peace delegation. On the return journey, he rescued a German gunsmith from captivity in Constantinople. The group arrived back in Vienna on 11 August 1555.

== Later life and death ==
Little is known about Dernschwam's life after his return. He is recorded to have lived in Neusohl (modern-day Banská Bystrica) or nearby Kremnitz (Kremnica) in 1560. Although the exact date of his death is unknown, he is believed to have died by late 1568, as his private library was sold to the Imperial Court Library in Vienna by a relative in February 1569. His collection, consisting of approximately 2,000 works in 651 volumes, was partially acquired by the Munich Library. Dernschwam died in Schattmannsdorf.

== Travelogue ==
The original manuscript of his travelogue, once held by the Fugger family, was rediscovered around 1889 in Fuggerschloss Babenhausen by archivist Father Dobel. The earliest surviving copies are held in the Wolfenbüttel Library, with another incomplete copy in the Bohemian Kingdom Museum in Prague. The first in-depth academic study was conducted by geographer Heinrich Kiepert in the 19th century. Later, Franz Babinger published a full edition based on the Fugger manuscript in 1923, written in Early New High German. Yaşar Önen translated the work to Turkish in 1987, although he omitted Babinger's extensive introduction.

Despite occasional condescending remarks about the Turks, Dernschwam's travelogue contains observations on the cities he visited and offers detailed descriptions of Christians and Jews living in the Ottoman Empire. He notably documented the presence of Germans, Austrians, and Hungarians in Anatolia. During his 18-month stay in Constantinople at the Elçi Han (lit. 'Ambassador's Inn') near Çemberlitaş, he made extensive notes on daily life, especially food and prices.
