= John Doget =

English diplomat and scholar

John Doget (c. 1435–1501) was an English diplomat, scholar and Renaissance humanist. He was the nephew of Cardinal Thomas Bourchier, Archbishop of Canterbury. He was born in Sherborne, Dorset, and was probably educated in Bourchier's household before being admitted to Eton College as a king's scholar about 1447. From Eton he passed to King's College, Cambridge, in 1451, and became a fellow there in 1454.

In 1460 Doget was ordained, and gained his Master of Theology in 1464. In the same year he left Cambridge and went to Bologna, where he studied Canon law and earned his doctorate in 1469. He returned to Cambridge in 1463.

Doget was sent to Rome to help arrange a peace between Pope Sixtus IV and Florence in 1479, dealing also with the princes of Sicily and Hungary. He was then appointed to an embassy to Christian I of Denmark. He was appointed domestic chaplain to Richard III in 1483.

At some time between 1473 and 1486, he presented his Examinatorium in Phaedonem Platonis, the first philosophical work by an English humanist, to Cardinal Bourchier. The text of the Phaedo on which Doget comments is the translation of Leonardo Bruni. As Roberto Weiss has pointed out in the commentary, "his aim appears to have been an interpretation of some of Plato's passages as Christian maxims. Because of this he deals principally with an explanation of obscure passages in the Phaedo, which are presented so as to emphasize their common points with Christian doctrine" (Weiss, p. 166). The neoplatonic texts cited by Doget, which include Marsilio Ficino's Latin version of the Pimander, or Poemander, of Hermes Trismegistus, are seen through the prism of Christian apologetics, and the Phaedo was no doubt chosen in the first place as a vehicle for his commentary because it could be presented as a mythologized version of Christian doctrine. Doget's manuscript was later purchased by another humanist, Robert Sherborn, Bishop of Chichester.

Henry VII presented him to the provostship of King's College in 1499. In 1500 he managed to obtain a licence from the King to impress men and boys into the King's College Choir, a much-needed privilege due to the complexity of polyphonic music at the time - skilled choir members were in high demand, Lady Margaret Beaufort having seized three clerks and a chorister from King's the year before Doget's appointment.

His will is dated 4 March 1501 and bequeathed all his books on canon law and theology to King's College. He died the following month, and was buried in Salisbury Cathedral.
