= Nocturnal (instrument) =

Astronomical tool to determine local time

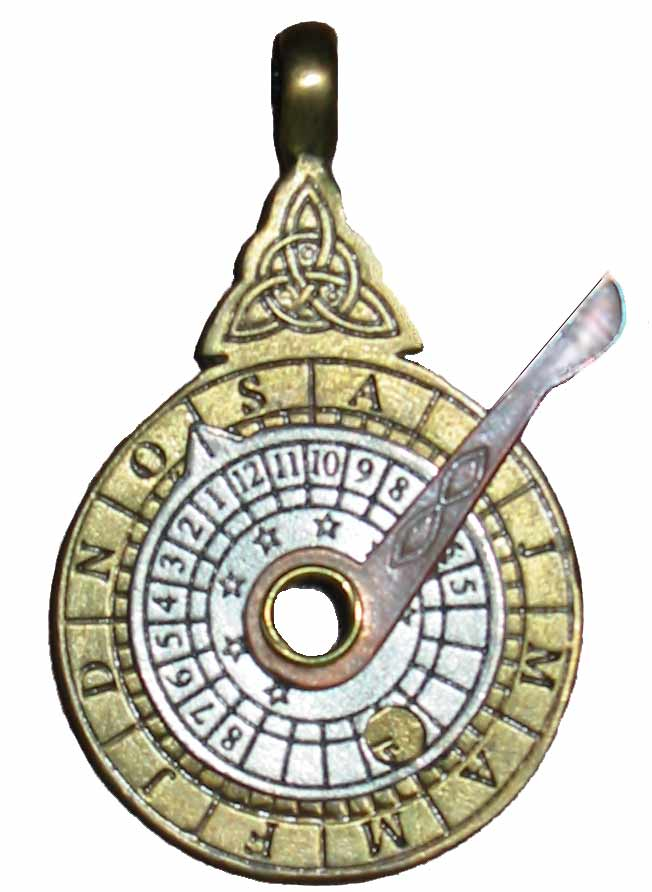
A nocturnal as custom jewellery. This is a functioning nocturnal, though only about 5 cm tall. It shows the month ring on the outside in brass. The silver coloured inner disk shows the time and has an indicator on one edge. By setting the indicator to the month and day (in this case, a few days into October), centring Polaris in the hole in the middle and rotating the pointer attached to the centre to a specified circumpolar star, the arm indicates the time (in this case, 8 pm).

A nocturnal is an instrument used to determine the local time based on the position of a star in the night sky relative to the pole star. As a result of the Earth's rotation, any fixed star makes a full revolution around the pole star in 23 hours and 56 minutes and therefore can be used as an hour hand. The 4-minute difference between the solar day and sidereal day requires a correction of this giant clock based on the date of observation, and nocturnal helps to apply this correction.

Sometimes called a horologium nocturnum (time instrument for night) or nocturlabe (in French and occasionally used by English writers), it is related to the astrolabe and sundial. Knowing the time is important in piloting for calculating tides and some nocturnals incorporate tide charts for important ports.

== History ==
The actual horologium nocturnum, a precursor for the later nocturnal instruments, was invented in the 9th century by Pacificus of Verona.

Even if the nightly course of the stars has been known since antiquity, mentions of a dedicated instrument for its measurement are not found before the Middle Ages. The earliest image presenting the use of a nocturnal is in a manuscript dated from the 12th century. Raymond Lull repeatedly described the use of a sphaera horarum noctis or astrolabium nocturnum.

With Martín Cortés de Albacar's book Arte de Navegar, published in 1551 the name and the instrument gained a larger popularity.

It was described also c. 1530 by Petrus Apianus in his Cosmographicus Liber, republished later by Gemma Frisius with a widely circulated illustration of the instrument while being used by an observer.

== Construction ==
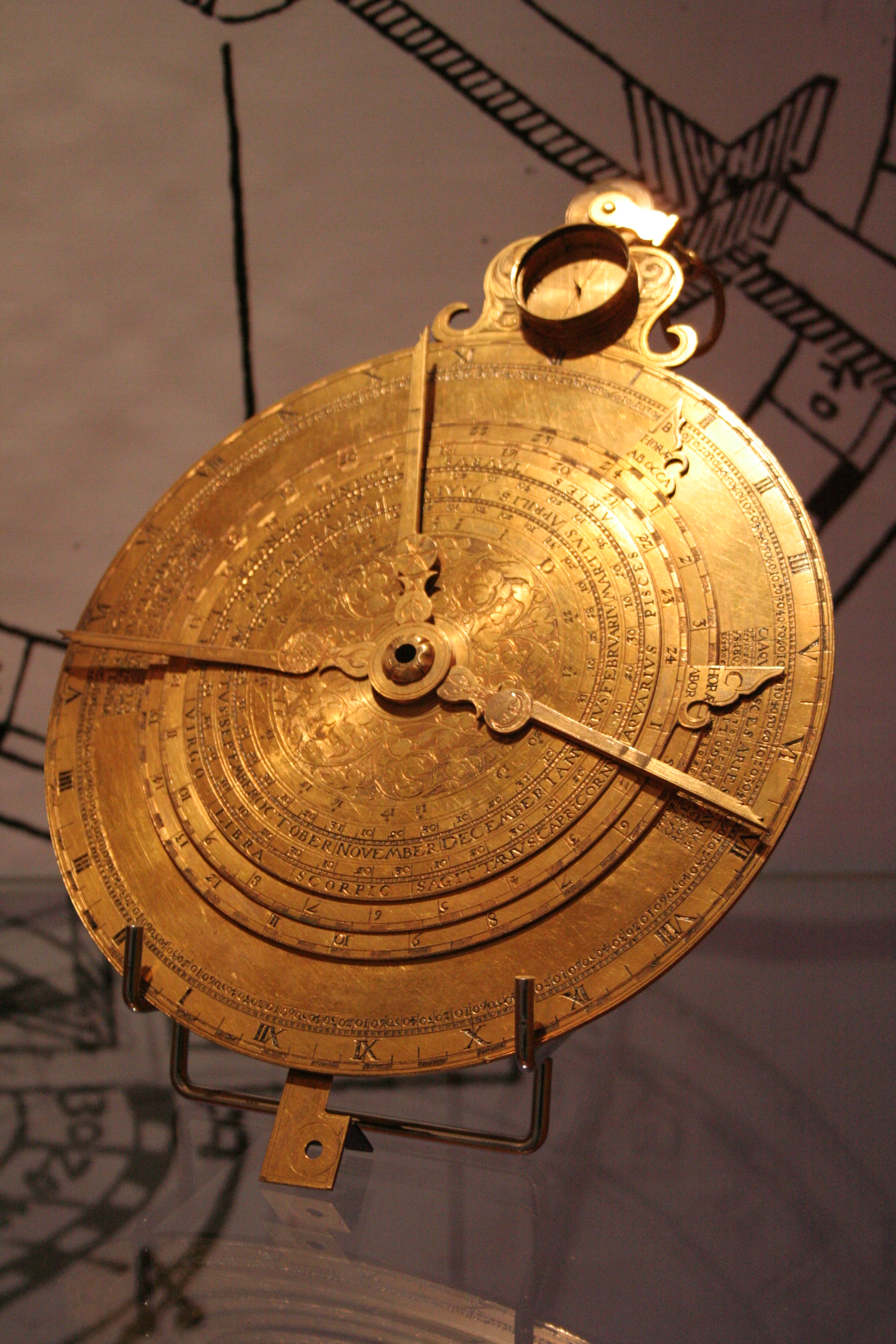
A nocturnal made in Vienna in 1584.

Nocturnals have been most commonly constructed of wood or brass.

A nocturnal will have an outer disc marked with the months of the year, and an inner disc marked with hours (and perhaps half hours, or quarter hours on the largest instruments) as well as locations for one or more reference stars. It will also have a pointer rotating on the same axis as the discs, sometimes extended beyond the rim. The axis, or pivot point, must be such that a star can be sighted through it; usually a hollow rivet is used. Since the instrument is used at night, markings may be exaggerated or raised. Often the inner disc has a diagram of the necessary constellations and stars, to aid in locating them.

== Usage ==
Operating scheme of a nocturnal.

A nocturnal is a simple analog computer, made of two or more dials, that will provide the local time based on the time of year and a sighting of Polaris, the North Star, and one or more other stars. In the Northern Hemisphere, all stars will appear to rotate about the North Star during the night, and their positions, like the progress of the Sun, can be used to determine the time. The positions of the stars will change based on the time of year.

The most commonly used reference stars are the pointer stars from the Big Dipper (Ursa Major) or Kochab from the Little Dipper (Ursa Minor). The star Schedar in Cassiopeia may also be used, since it is on the opposite side of the sky from Ursa Major.

The inner disc is rotated so that the mark for the chosen reference star points to the current date on the outer disc. The north star is sighted through the center of the device, and the pointer arm is rotated to point at the chosen reference star. The intersection of the pointer arm with the hour markings on the inner disc indicates the time. The instrument must be held upright, and should have a handle or similar hint as to which direction is down.

It is not possible to convert the local time to a standard time such as UTC without accurate knowledge of the observer's longitude. Similarly, it is not possible to determine longitude unless the observer also knows the standard time from a chronometer.

== See also ==
- List of astronomical instruments
- Sidereal time

== Sources ==
- Oestmann, Günther (2001). "On the History of the Nocturnal" (PDF). Bulletin of the Scientific Instrument Society. 69: 5–9.
