= Hoşaf =

Turkish and Iranian desert made of dried fruit

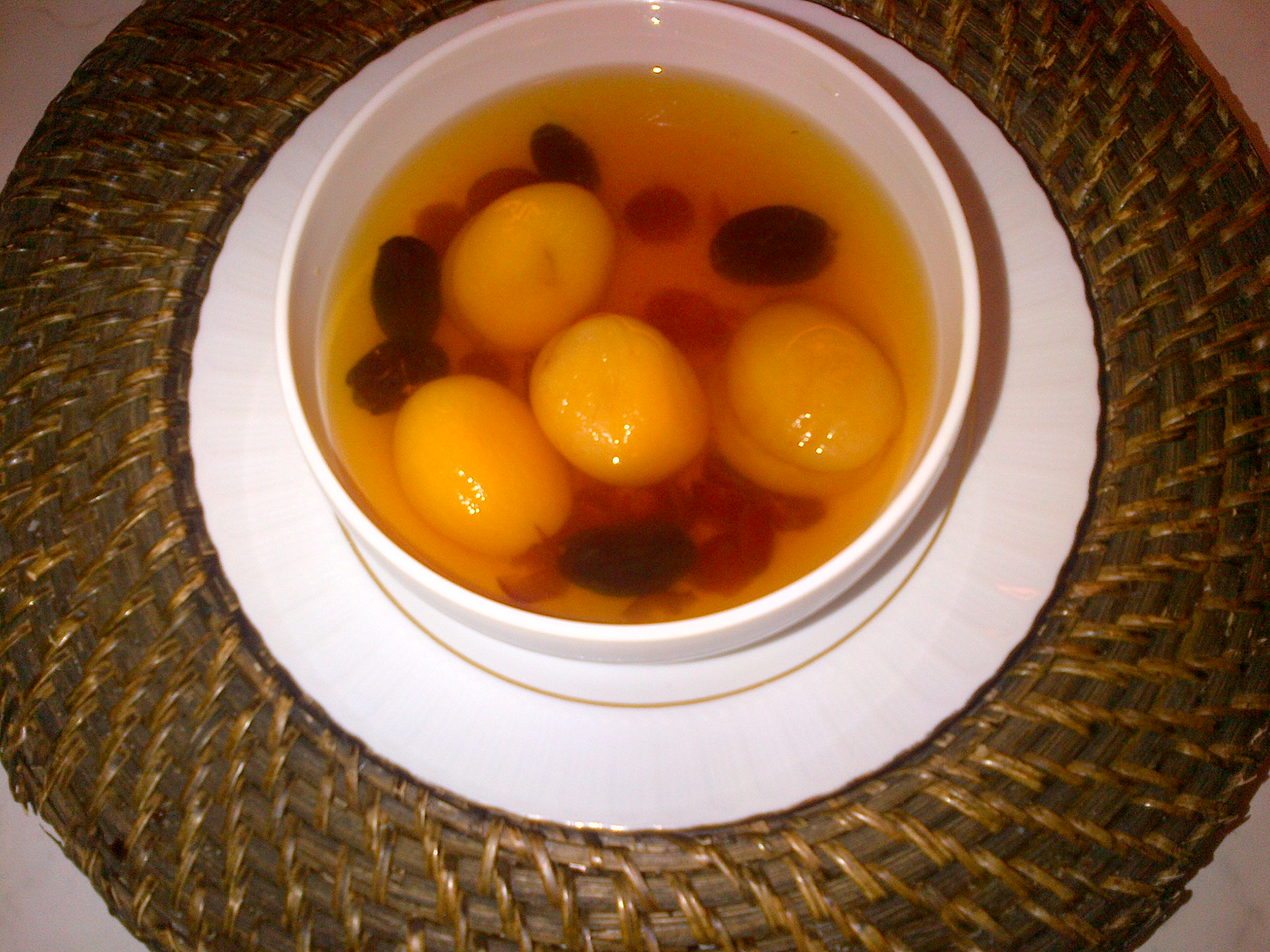
Apricot, plum and raisin hoşaf

Hoşaf (Turkish, from Persian خوشآب khosh ab meaning nice water) is an Iranian and Turkish dessert made of dried fruits like raisins, dried prunes, apricots, and figs boiled in water with some sugar and left to cool. Hoşaf may also contain cinnamon or cloves.

It is often consumed with dishes without juices, such as pilav and makarna, just like cacık. It is especially consumed during Ramadan, as a tradition.

Differently from kompot, hoşaf is always served cold. Whereas, the similar, and more universal, fresh fruit compote is called "komposto" in Turkish.

== In popular culture ==
In Turkish language there are several idioms with the word hoşaf. Hoşafın yağı kesilmek and Eşek hoşaftan ne anlar? may be translated as "not to be able to explain a situation or find an excuse for a misdeed" and "throw pearls before swine" respectively.

== See also ==
- List of Turkish desserts
