= Hieronymus Balbus =

French humanist (c. 1460 – 1535)

Hieronymus Balbus (also called Girolamo Balbi or Accellini) was a Renaissance Humanist, poet, diplomat, and Bishop of Gurk in Carinthia, b. about 1450 in Venice; d. there, probably 1535.

== Scholar ==
Balbus was educated at Padua, and obtained a degree in Civil and Canon Law.

At Rome, he was a pupil of Julius Pomponius Laetus, the founder of the Roman Academy. As a young man, he was reportedly of a quarrelsome disposition, and, for a time, led a very loose life. But in later years he was highly respected and came to be regarded as one of the most accomplished men of his day. In 1485 he was professor at the University of Paris. His overbearing manner here soon brought him into conflict with various scholars, and in consequence of the attack which these men made on his character, he was obliged to leave Paris in 1491. A few years later (1494), at the invitation of Emperor Maximilian I, he went to the University of Vienna, where he lectured on poetry, the Roman classics, and jurisprudence; he was there for only two years. He was again in Paris, for a short period, in 1495, and visited London in 1496, but resumed his professorship in Vienna in 1497. Here he became a member of the Danube Society, and lived on terms of close friendship with its founder, Conrad Celtes the Humanist, at that time professor and librarian at the University of Vienna. In little less than a year, renewed conflicts with his colleagues caused him to quit Vienna. Balbus next went to Prague (1498), where he accepted a professorship that had been obtained for him by his Viennese friends. But his irregular conduct, scandalous writings, and disputatious temper soon drove him from the city. On leaving Prague he withdrew to Hungary (Pécs), and remained in retirement for a period of fifteen years, during which time he changed his manner of life completely, and even took religious orders. His subsequent career as an ecclesiastic was one of considerable distinction. He became provost of the Cathedral Chapter in Waizen (Vácz, Vaciensis), 1513, and then in 1515 also of that in Bratislava (Pressburg, Posoniensis), and, for some years, held an important position at the Court of Hungary, where he was a tutor of the royal princes, and private secretary to the king, Ladislaus VI.

== Diplomat ==
In 1521 Balbus appeared at the Diet of Worms as the ambassador of Louis II of Hungary and Bohemia, and attracted considerable attention by a discourse in which he protested against the innovations of Martin Luther, and urged upon the assembled princes the necessity of a joint undertaking against the Turks.

Shortly afterward he was in the service of Archduke Ferdinand of Austria, who, in 1522, designated him Bishop of Gurk, and sent him to Rome on a congratulatory embassy to the newly elected pontiff, Adrian VI. It was a part of his mission also to induce the pope to proclaim a crusade against Turkey. The address which he made on being received by the pope in a public audience, 9 February 1523, was praised for its eloquence in humanist circles. In it, Balbus excoriated the pope for his lukewarm attitude to a crusade against the Turks; "Fabius Maximus, Most Holy Father, restored Rome by delaying, but you are striving to lose Rome and Europe as well by your delaying."

== Bishop ==
Balbus remained in Rome for some time, and was there appointed Bishop of Gurk by Pope Adrian VI in the papal consistory of 23 February 1523. He was consecrated a bishop on 25 March 1523. Even before his consecration, on 11 March 1523, he was assigned a coadjutor bishop, Antonius Hoyos of Salamanca, a cleric of the diocese of Burgos; Antonius was only in his 18th year. He succeeded Bishop Hieronymus on 25 June 1526. Antonius was still not consecrated in January 1529.

Balbi held a diocesan synod in Gurk on 4 January 1524.

On 8 March 1524, Balbi was elected a Conservator of the University of Padua by the Venetian Council of Ten.

As a bishop, Hieronymus was frequently absent from his diocese. One of his letters mentions that in the time of Clement VII he lived in Rome for some years in the papal palace and was much in the confidence of that pontiff. In 1530, though quite an old man, he accompanied Emperor Charles V to Bologna to attend the emperor's coronation. At Bologna he wrote his best-known work, De coronatione principum, which, on account of the views it contains on the relation of Church and State, was placed on the Index Librorum Prohibitorum, 23 July 1611. Balbus was the author of many other works, including poetical, oratorical, and politico-moral writings which were edited by Joseph von Retzer (Vienna, 1791–92, 2 vols.).

== Sources ==
- Allen, P.S. (July 1902). "Hieronymus Balbus in Paris". The English Historical Review. 17 (67): 417–428. doi:10.1093/ehr/XVII.LXVII.417. JSTOR 549035.
- Rill, Gerhard. "BALBI, Girolamo," (in Italian), in: Dizionario Biografico degli Italiani, Volume 5 (1963).
- Tournoy Gilbert (1978). "The Literary Production of Hieronymus Balbus at Paris," in: Gutenberg – Jahrbuch 1978, pp. 70-77.
- Tournoy, Gilbert (1979). "L'oeuvre poétique de Jérôme Balbi après son arrivée dans le Saint-Empire Romain," in: L'Humanisme allemand (1490–1540): XVIIIe Colloque international de Tours (Paris/Munich 1979), pp. 321-337.
- Eubel, Conradus; Gulik, Guilelmus, eds. (1923). Hierarchia catholica (in Latin). Vol. 3 (Tomus III) (second ed.). Münster: Libreria Regensbergiana.. Archived.
- Weiss, Roberto (1939). "Cornelio Vitelli in France and England". The Journal of the Warburg and Courtauld Institutes. 2 (3): 219–226. doi:10.2307/750099. JSTOR 750099.
