= Giovanni Mansionario =

Italian humanist (died 1337)

Giovanni de Matociis (died December 1337) commonly called Giovanni Mansionario by his administrative office in the cathedral of Verona, was an early Italian humanist, a forerunner of Petrarch. In about 1311 he was appointed as mansionario, a role for a person in minor orders variously described by sources as a sacristan or recipient of a minor benefice from legacies: Vivaldi held such a position some four centuries later. Giovanni was also a notary. From this time he began work amassing his Historia Imperialis ("Imperial History") a series of emperors' biographies, beginning with Augustus, in which his antiquarian bent and classical studies amended many misconceptions of ancient Roman history. Though he depended on Isidore's Etymologiae to a degree that would have been considered naive a century later, and on the Historia Augusta, deprecated nowadays, his marginal drawings of Roman coins show that numismatics had been brought to the historian's aid perhaps for the first time in this work. Roberto Weiss has observed that "during the early Trecento [14th century] such a work as the Historia Imperialis could have been produced only in Verona", with the unrivalled library holdings of its cathedral chapter. His Latin has been described as "nondescript, unadorned".

By his careful reading of the Roman historian Suetonius, Giovanni detected that there were two authors named Pliny, not one, as had been believed previously. He published his findings triumphantly in a tract (Brevis adnotatio de duobus Pliniis). Other works include a Gesta Romanorum Pontificum, of which only part survives, and a lost life of Saint Athanasius and a book on the Old Testament, also lost.
