= Eggplant salads and appetizers =

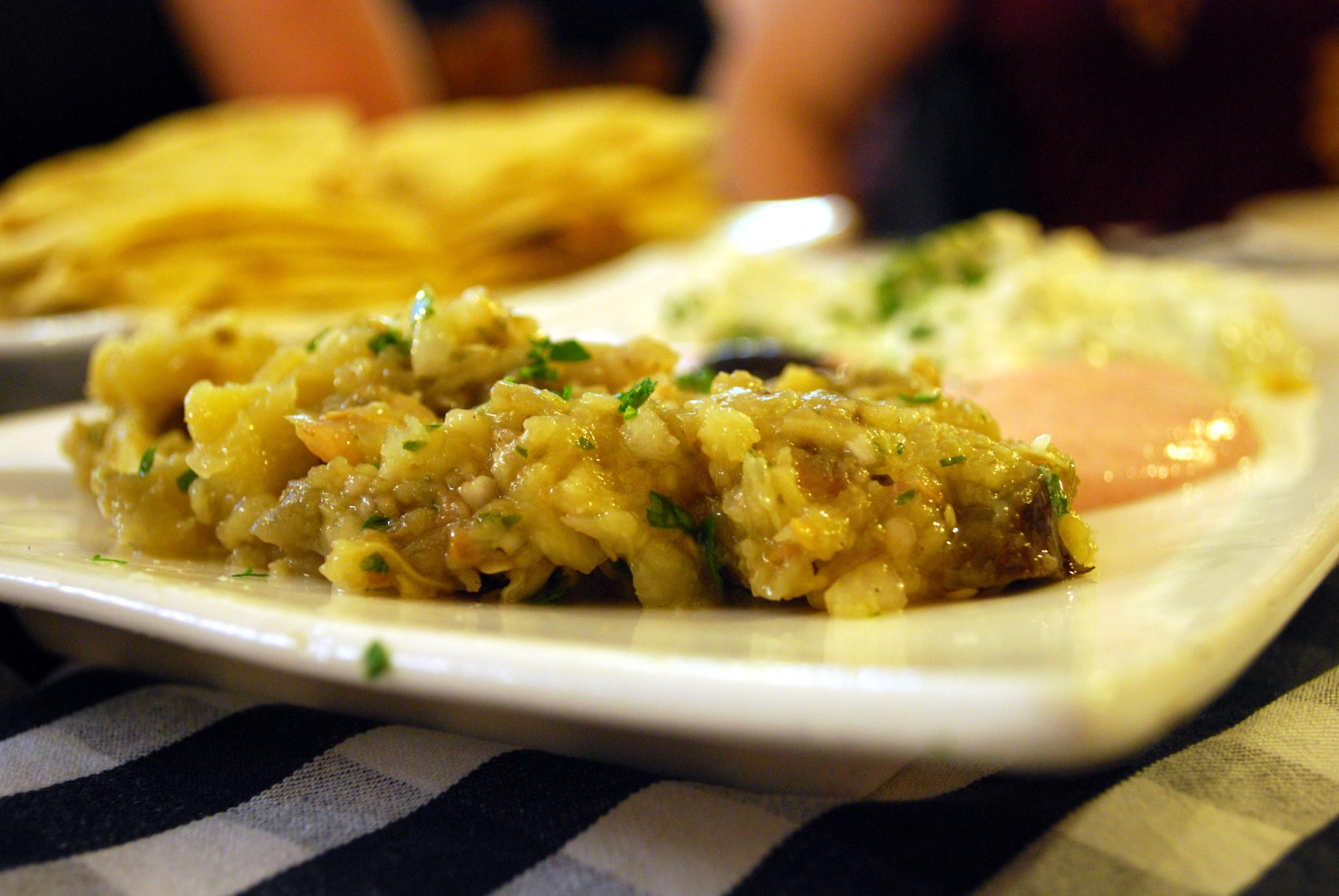
- Baba ghanoush
- Type: Salad
- Main ingredients: Eggplants

Many cuisines feature eggplant salads and appetizers.

== Varieties ==
=== Middle East, Caucasus, Africa ===
Baba ghanoush (Arabic: بابا غنوج bābā ghanūj) is a popular Levantine dish of eggplant (aubergine) mashed and mixed with various seasonings. Frequently the eggplant is baked or broiled over an open flame before peeling, so that the pulp is soft and has a smoky taste. Baba ghanoush is usually eaten as a dip with pita bread, and is sometimes added to other dishes. It is usually of an earthy light brown color. In Ethiopia, this dish is commonly known as blagadoush.

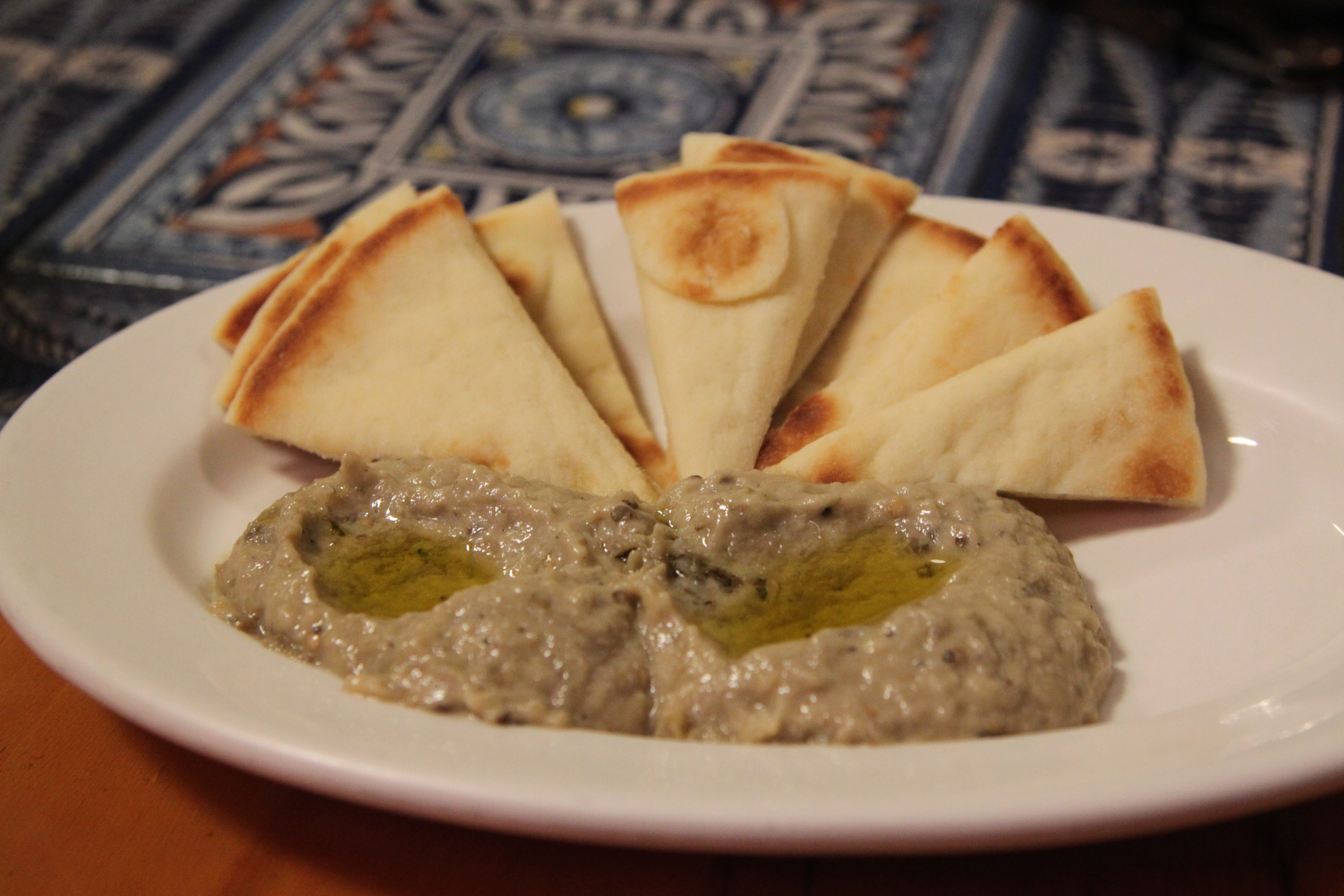
Mutabbal

Similar to baba ghanoush is another Levantine dish, mutabbal (Arabic: متبل, lit. 'spiced'), which is sometimes also referred to as baba ghanouj. This dish also includes mashed cooked vegetables (not necessarily aubergines) and tahini, and mixed with salt, black pepper, olive oil, and anar seeds. Mutabbal is sometimes said to be a spicier version of baba ghanoush. In Palestine and Jordan, pumpkin mutabbal is a popular traditional dish.

In Armenia, the dish is known as mutabal. The essential ingredients in Armenian mutabal are eggplant, tahini, garlic, lemon, and onion; most Armenians also add cumin.

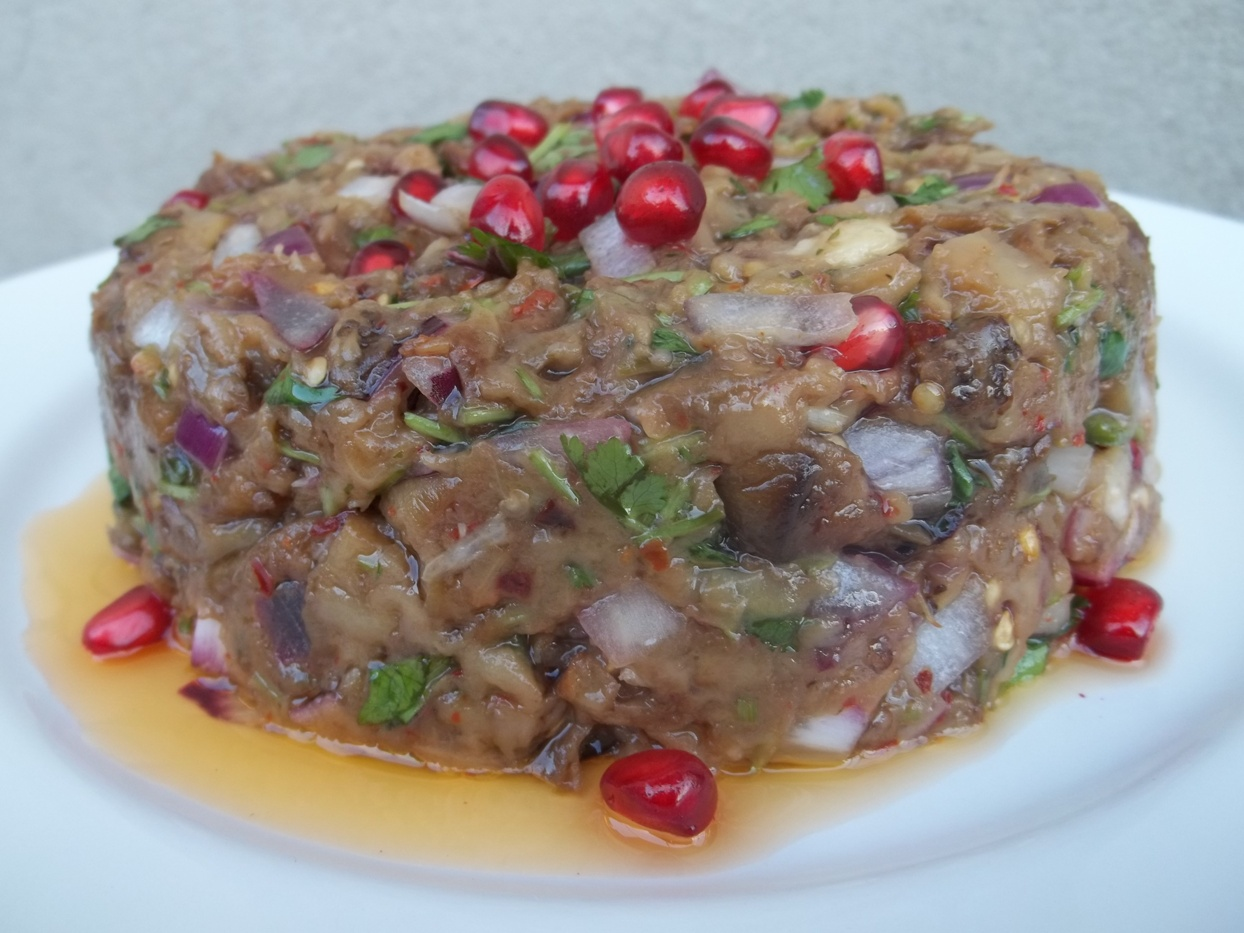
Georgian badrijnis khizilala

Georgian badrijnis khizilala ("aubergine caviar") is made of fried and chopped eggplants. Further typical ingredients are onions, garlic, pomegranate, hot red pepper, vegetable oil and fresh green cilantro.

In Israel, the traditional version called salat ḥatzilim is made with mashed grilled aubergines, tahini, olive oil, lemon, garlic and parsley. A variation made with mayonnaise instead of tahini, called salat ḥatzilim b'mayonnaise, is also widely available.

In Morocco, a fried eggplant dish made with tomatoes, garlic, olive oil, cumin, paprika and parsley is called zaalouk.

Eggplant relish is a Middle Eastern-north African dish. It is made of eggplant, salt, olive oil, lemon, and parsley.

In Egypt, papa ghannug is made of grilled and then peeled eggplant with tahini, water, salt, pepper, lemon, and parsley. Papa ghannug is eaten with bread.

In Iranian cuisine, eggplant is prepared into an appetizer known as kashk bademjan and mirza ghasemi. It is made with whey sauce (kashk).

=== Turkey, the Balkans and Eastern Europe ===
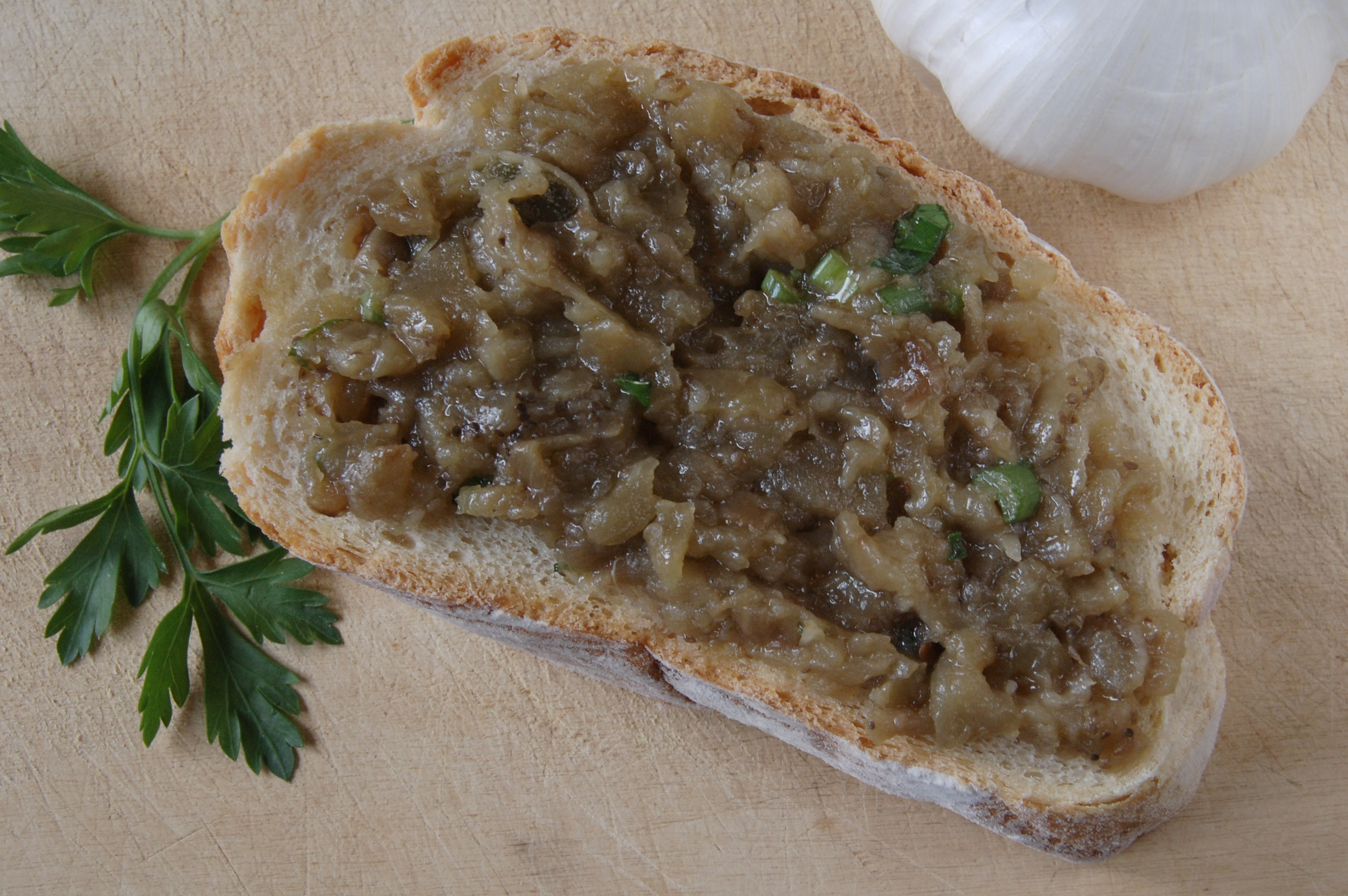
Greek melitzanosalata

In Turkish cuisine, İmam bayıldı is an eggplant stew, commonly prepared with olive oil, onions and tomatoes. The dish is known in Greece as Ιμάμ μπαϊλντί (Imam bayildi) or just imam. Patlican ezmesi is a dip or spread made with aubergine, olive oil, lemon juice, garlic (and yoghurt).

In Greece and Cyprus, melitzanosalata (μελιτζανοσαλάτα; "eggplant salad") is made with olive oil and lemon juice. Other ingredients typically include garlic, onion, and parsley. Sometimes spices like cumin and red pepper flakes are added. Garnishes may include feta cheese or olives. In Greece, the dish is popular during the 40-day Lenten fast as it provides a non-animal-based alternative to dips like tzatziki during the fast. This is due to Greece being a very religious Orthodox Christian country.

Malidzano, a traditional Macedonian spread, is made from puréed eggplants, sirenje cheese, walnuts and spices. It is usually served as appetizer along with bread. In other countries of Western Balkans (Serbia, Bosnia and Herzegovina, Croatia) it is prepared from green peppers and eggplant.

Salată de vinete (Eggplant salad), vinete, or padlizsánkrém, is a Romanian, Moldovan and Hungarian mashed eggplant salad made of grilled, peeled and finely chopped eggplants, sunflower oil or olive oil, and chopped onions. The eggplants are grilled on an open flame until they are covered with black ash crust. The crust is cleaned off and the remaining cooked eggplant is mashed with a blunt, thick wooden cleaver (knife) on a wooden platter (popular belief has it that using a metal knife will turn the eggplant flesh black, before stainless steel blades, but also because cutting through the seeds is to be avoided). The eggplant mash is mixed in a bowl, stirring continuously, with sunflower oil, chopped onions and salt. The mix is beaten vigorously. Crushed garlic and ground pepper may be added too. Instead of oil, mayonnaise can be used, although not traditionally. A zest of lemon is added at the end and the platter is sometimes garnished with tomato slices.

A typical zakuska in Russia and Ukraine (especially Odesa) is known as baklažannaja ikra (Russian: баклажанная икра) or baklažanna ikra (Ukrainian: баклажанна ікра), literally meaning "aubergine caviar". Some versions add chopped tomatoes to the basic recipe. Another eggplant salad popular in Russia is called he iz baklažanov (Russian: хе из баклажанов), and it is probably influenced by Korean cuisine. Eggplant he is based on julienned (instead of mashed) cooked aubergines and other vegetables, prepared with concentrated vinegar. After adding the vinegar, it is set aside for several hours to cure before eating.

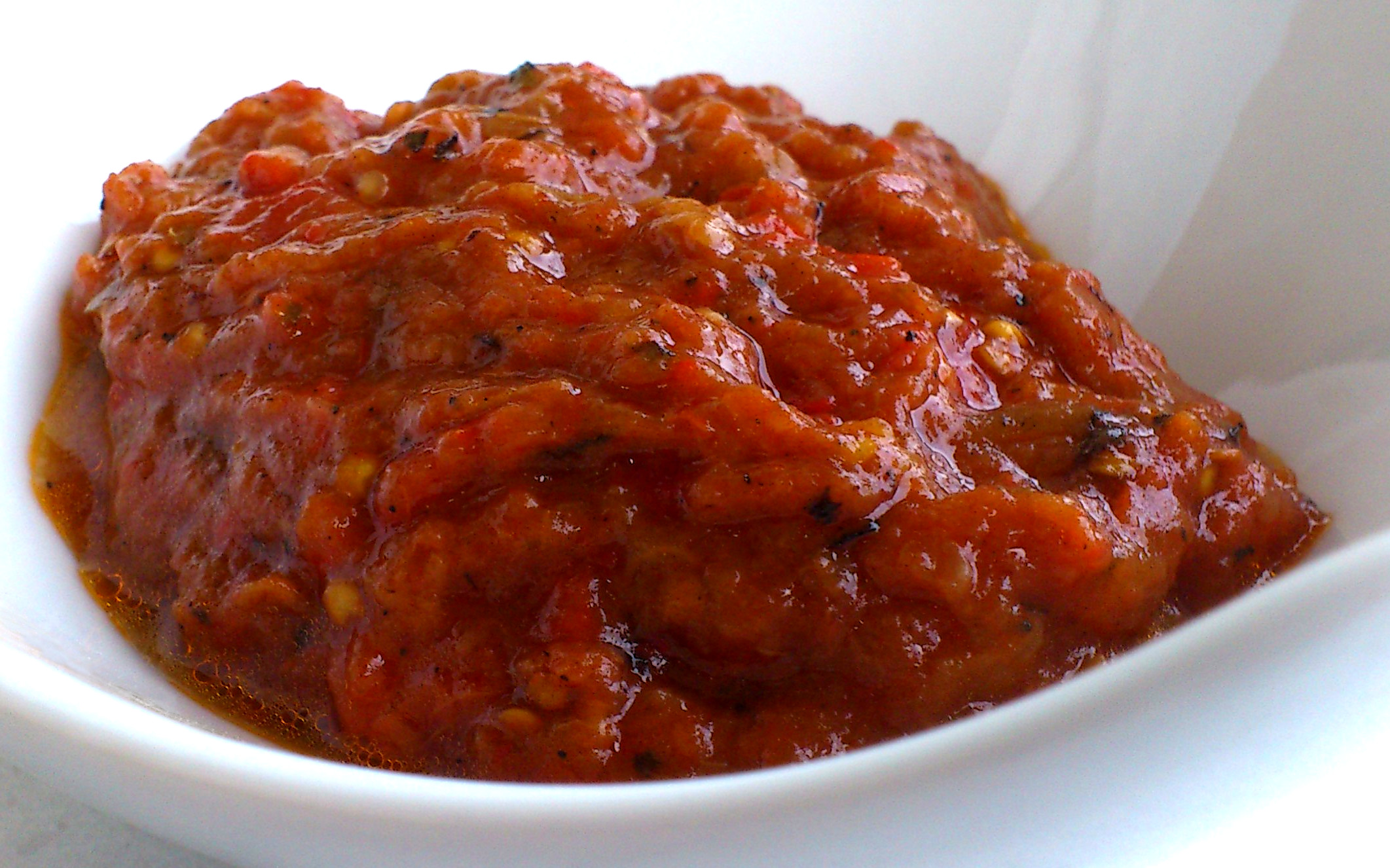
Bulgarian kyopolou

In Turkey, a similar meze is called patlıcan salatası ("eggplant salad"). It is made with grilled mashed eggplant, olive oil, lemon juice and garlic; sometimes, tahini, chopped tomato and green pepper as well. More frequently, eggplant is mixed with yoghurt, olive oil and garlic. The version with cut eggplants can be found in southern Turkey, especially in Antakya. In other varieties, called şakşuka or köpoğlu, roasted and chopped eggplants and peppers are served with garlic yogurt or tomato sauce. The latter is also a typical eggplant appetizer in Bulgaria, where it is called kyopolou. Hünkarbeğendi is another Turkish dish, which is a mutton or lamb (nowadays also veal) stew where the meat is served hot on a bed of eggplant purée. The purée also contains kaşar cheese, milk and flour.

=== South Asia ===
In Indian and Pakistani cuisine, an eggplant dish, by the name of baingan bartha, is popular especially in the regions of Punjab, Maharashtra, Bihar, Orissa and West Bengal. It is also eaten across Pakistan, as well as in Bangladesh. The dish has many names, depending on the local language (Hindi: baingan ka bharta, Bengali: বেগুন ভর্তা begun bhôrta, Marathi: wangyacha bharit).

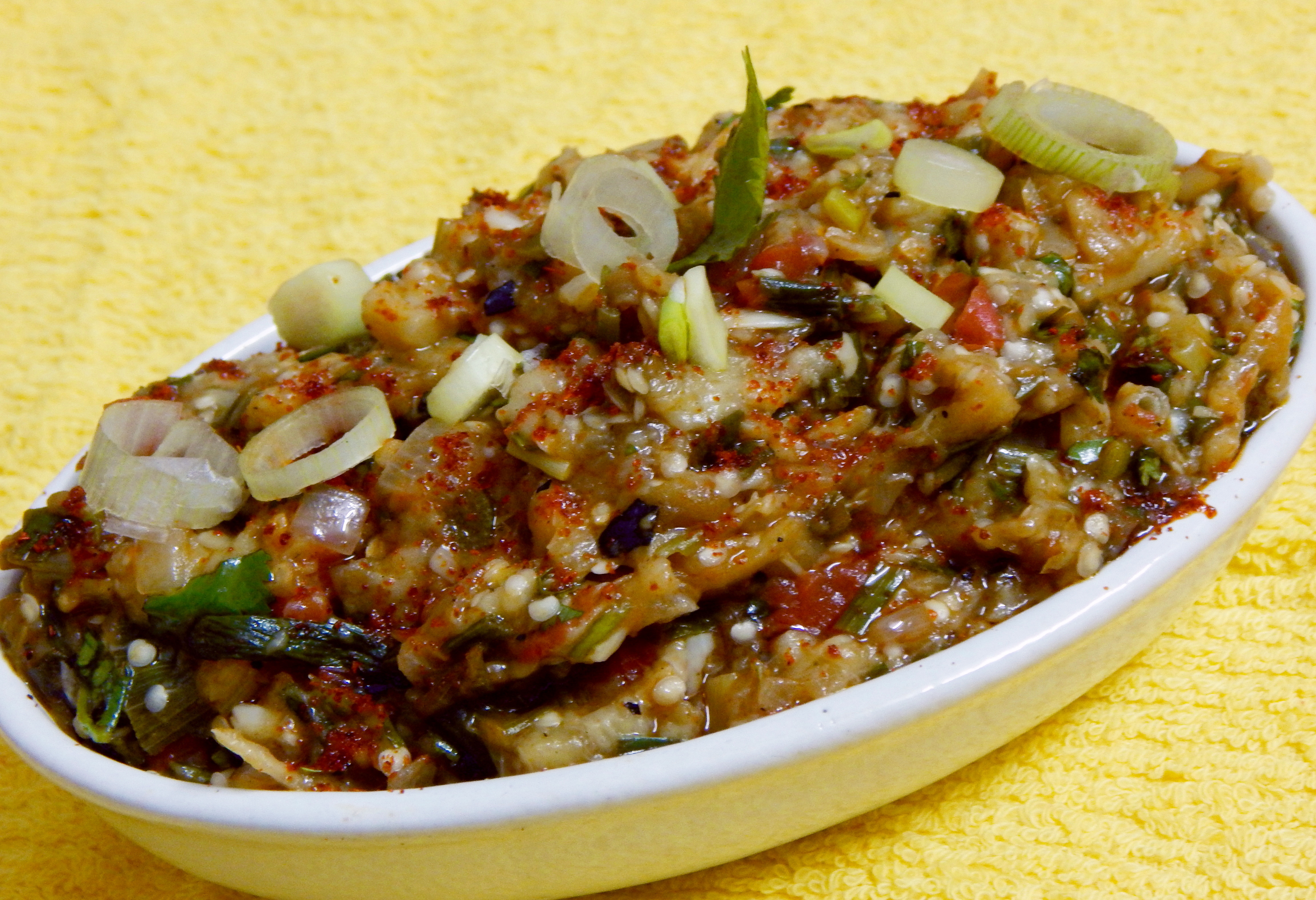
Baingan bartha

In the South Indian state of Tamil Nadu, the Tamils prepare kathrikai thayir kothsu, in which the eggplant is cooked, mashed and sautéed with mustard, red chili peppers, and sesame oil, after which yogurt is added to the mixture and dressed with cilantro coriander leaves. It is often eaten with an Indian flatbread (specifically roti or paratha), and is also served with rice, and/or raita (a yoghurt salad).

Kashmiris prepare a spicy and tangy dish of eggplants called choek wangun with tamarind constituting an important part of the gravy.

=== East and Southeast Asia ===
Eggplant mash (茄泥) is a Chinese recipe of steamed and mashed eggplant. It is served with dressings such as pounded garlic with soy sauce. In Sichuan cuisine many people also like to add hot peppers and cilantro. It is a common lunch dish and may be eaten with rice or rolls.

Mashed eggplant is also part of Hmong cuisine and it contains hot peppers and cilantro.

In Korea, steamed or poached strips of eggplant seasoned with garlic, toasted sesame oil and chili is a common side dish called 가지나물 (gaji namul, literally “eggplant salad.”)

=== Western Europe and Latin America ===
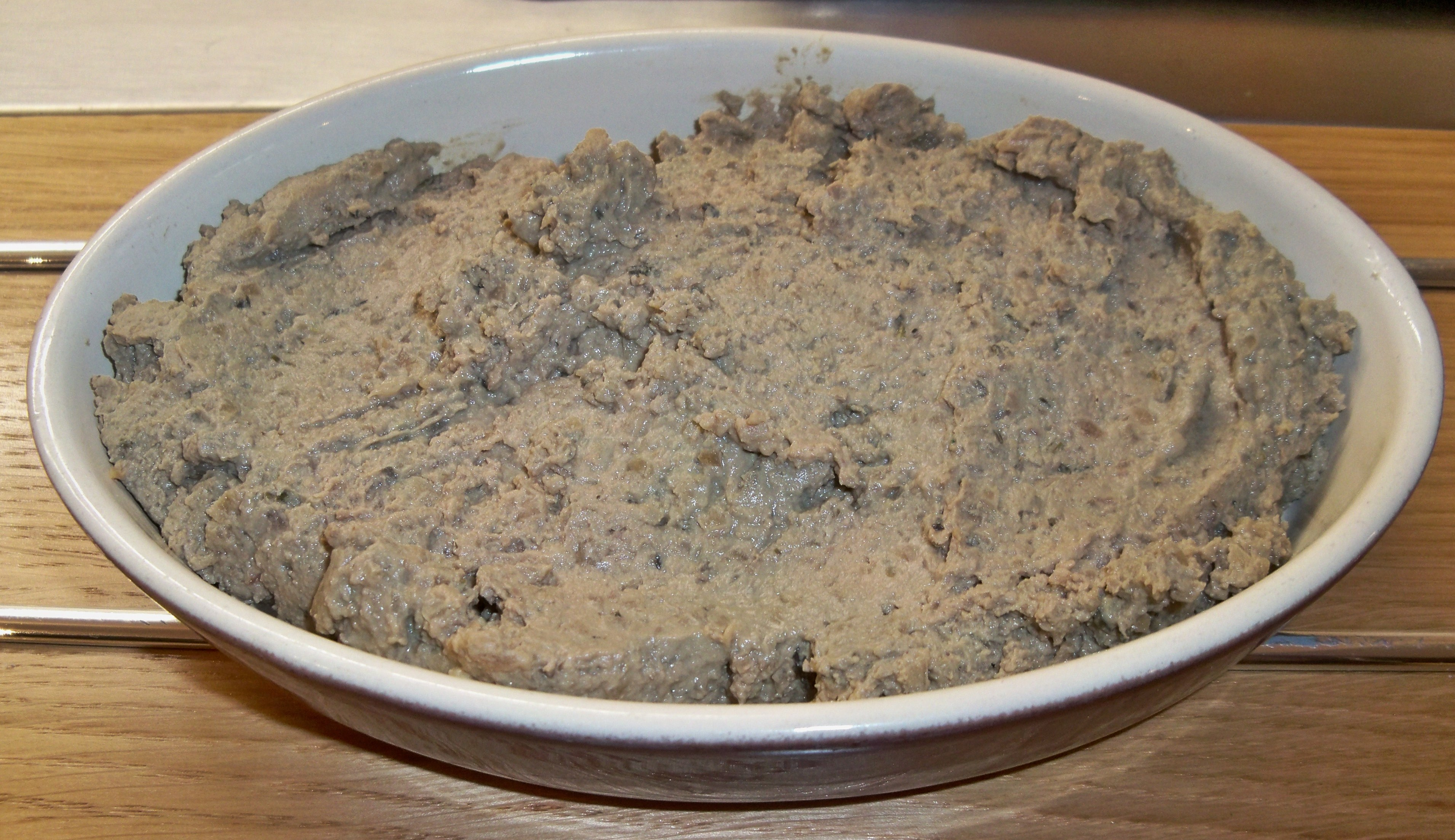
French caviar d'aubergine

Caviar d'aubergine is prepared in southern France. Baked, peeled aubergine is mixed with garlic, tomato, parsley, lemon juice, and finally olive oil. It is served as an appetizer with French bread, possibly along with olive tapenade.

Caponata is a Sicilian eggplant relish made from chopped fried vegetables (mostly eggplants and peppers), seasoned with celery, olives and capers, in a sweet sour sauce. Today, caponata is typically used as a side dish or appetizer, but, since the 18th century, it has sometimes been used as a main course.

Berenjena a la vinagreta is a typical appetizer in Hispanosphere made from boiled eggplants in a vinaigrette. The eggplant is usually salted to remove moisture then boiled until soft and then placed into a vinaigrette with garlic and various herbs or spices. In Argentina the eggplants will rest in the vinaigrette, often containing plenty of oil, for several days and then is eaten as part of a picada before a meal. In Spain, it can be found along other pinchos at tapas bars. In Catalonia region, eggplant is roasted and seasoned with olive oil in the dish escalivada.

== See also ==
- List of hors d'oeuvre
- List of eggplant dishes
- List of salads
- List of vegetable dishes
