= Eyval =

Restaurant in New York City, U.S.

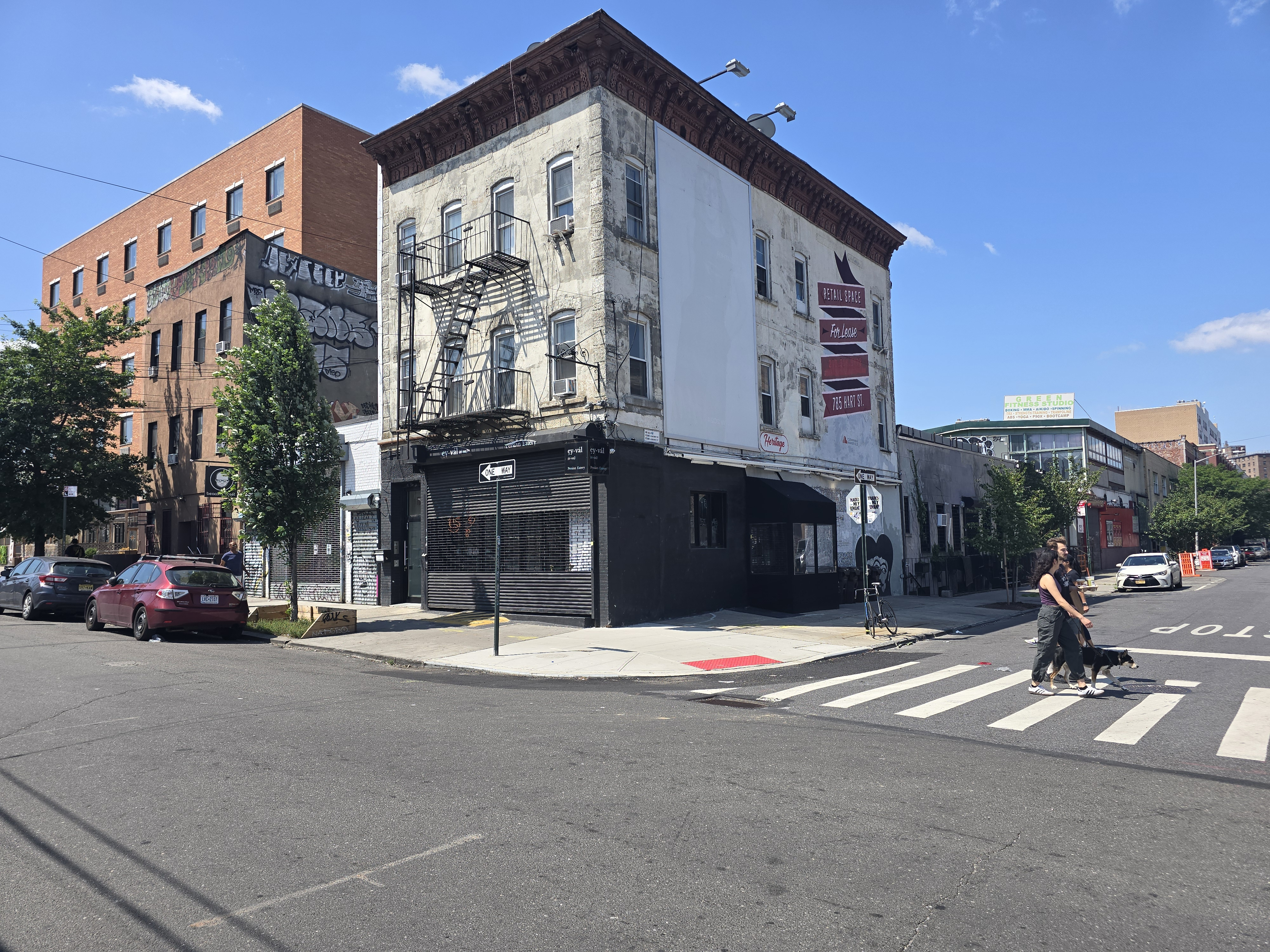
- Interactive map of Eyval

Restaurant information
- Established: March 23, 2022
- Head chef: Ali Saboor
- Chef: Soroosh Golbabae
- Food type: Persian
- Dress code: Casual
- Location: 25 Bogart Street, Brooklyn, Kings, New York, 11206, United States
- Coordinates: 40°42′15″N 73°55′59″W
- Website: www.eyvalnyc.com

Eyval, or in Persian ایول meaning "right on", is a restaurant in Bushwick, Brooklyn, New York City serving Persian food. They are closely related to Sofreh, another Persian restaurant in Park Slope, Brooklyn with the head chef Alireza (or in short Ali) Saboor being the old head chef at Eyval. The food primarily features modern takes on Iranian street food such as kashk bademjan or eggplant with strained yogurt and bastani, a Persian ice cream sandwich with saffron ice cream, vanilla wafer, pistachio, and rose. They were listed as a top 10 new restaurant back in 2022 by The New York Times and was ranked 66th in the top 100 restaurants by The New York Times in 2023 before rising up to 26th place on their top 100 list in 2024.

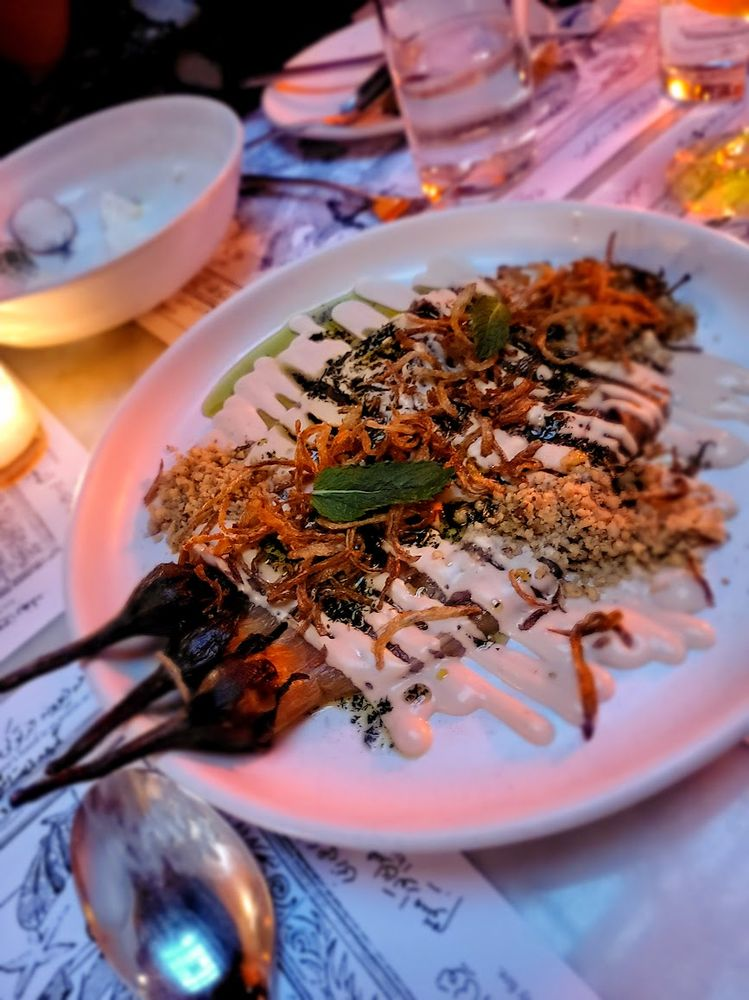
Kashk Bademjan, an eggplant dish with cured yogurt/kashk

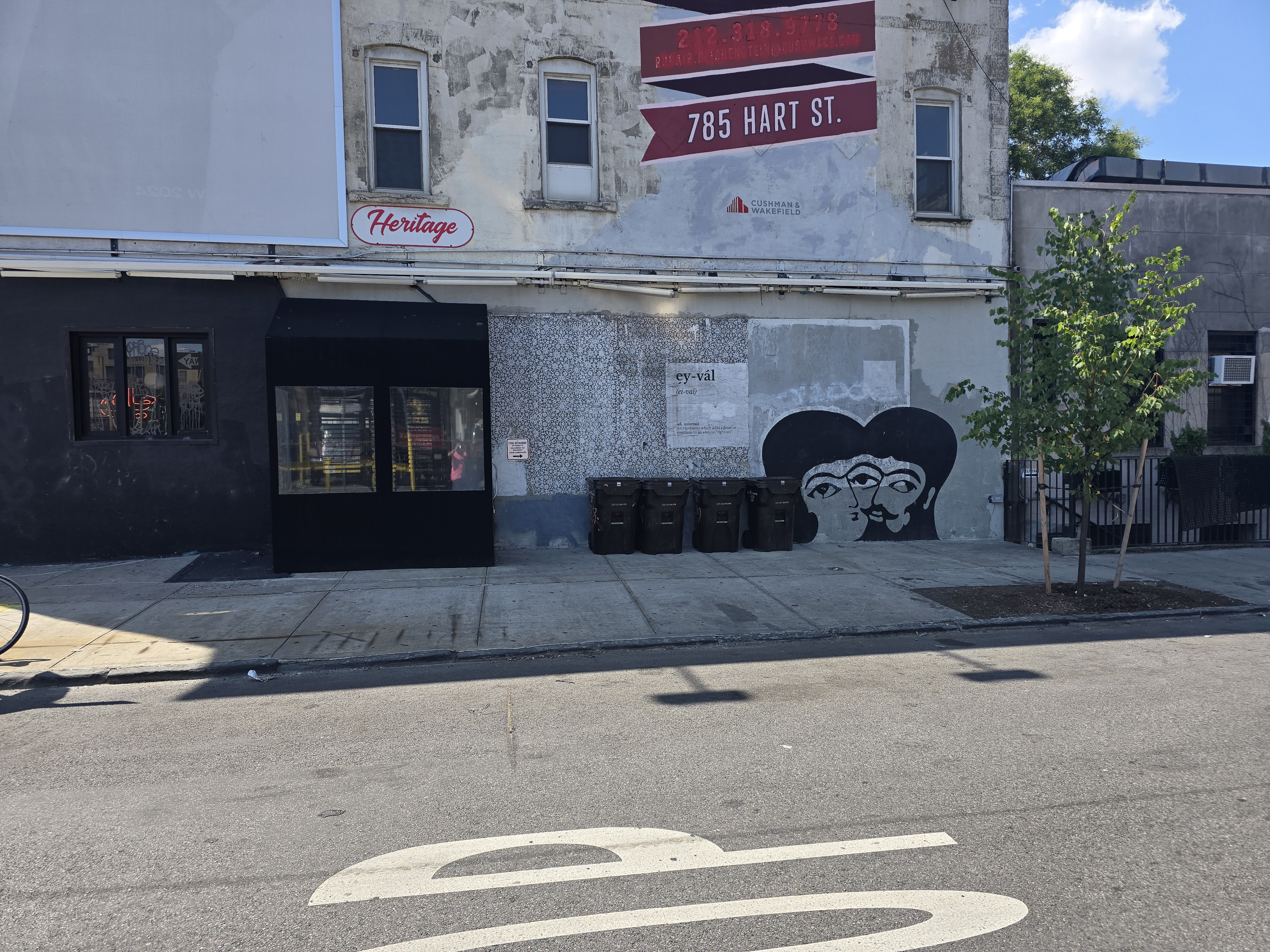
The entrance to Eyval
