= Kashk =

Sour dairy product, popular in Central Asia and Northern Middle East

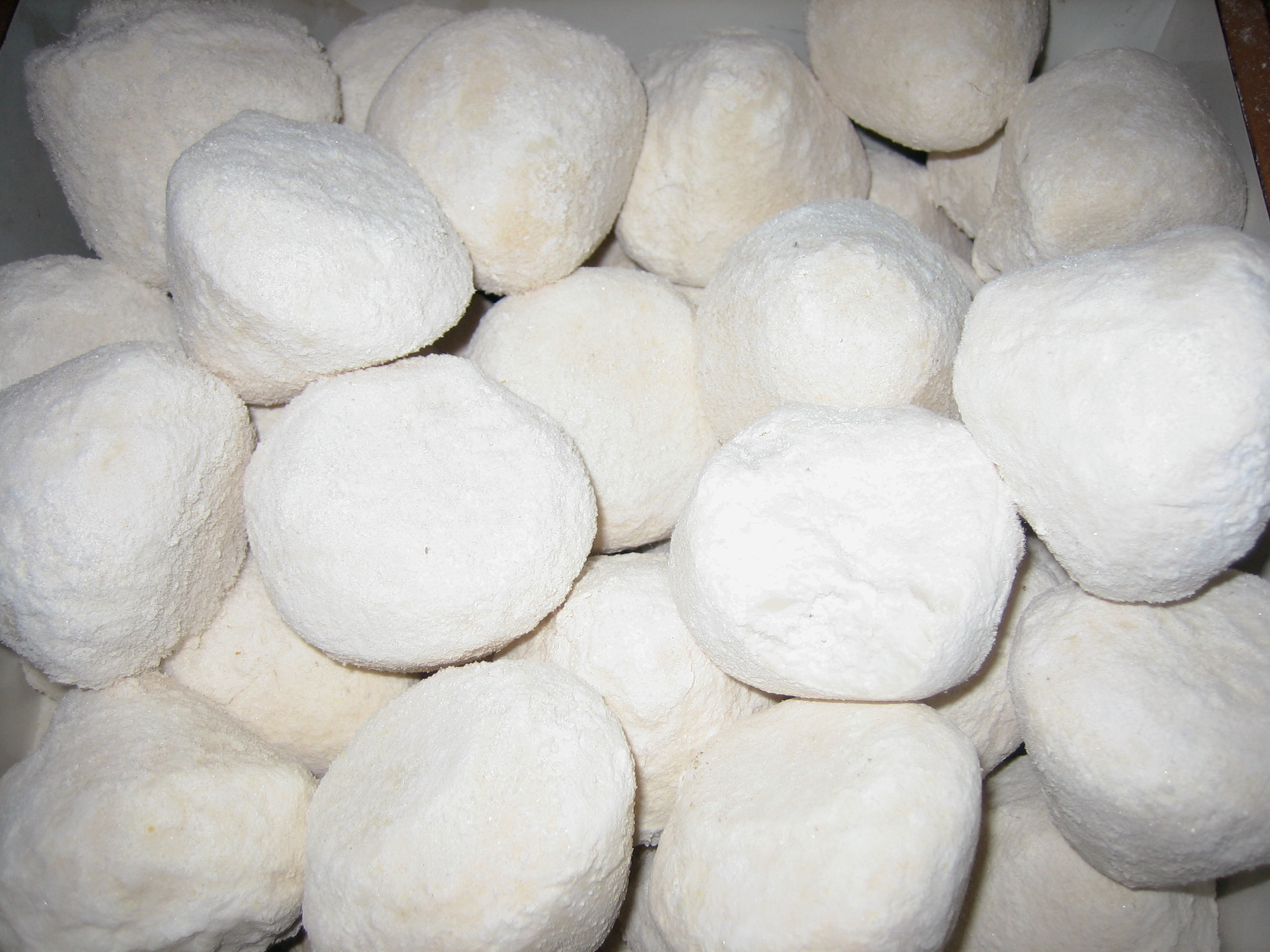
- Balls of jameed sold at the souq in Jerusalem
- Alternative names: dried yogurt, qurut, kurut, khuruud, Aaruul, chortan, jameed, shilanch, kishk, qqet
- Type: Cheese
- Region or state: Caucasus, Central Asia, Middle East, Egypt
- Main ingredients: Yogurt, salt
- Other information: 21.60–39.31 %water, 4.5–23.5% fat, 31.22–50.68% protein, 2.84–13.19% salt

Kashk, kishk, (Persian: کشک kašk, Turkish: keş, Sorani Kurdish: کەشک keşk) qurut, qurt, kurut, kurt (Tuvan and Kyrgyz: курут kurut, Kazakh: құрт qūrt, Turkish: kurut, Turkmen: gurt, Azerbaijani, Tajik and Uzbek: қурут qurut, Persian: قروت), jameed (Arabic: جميد), shilanch (Balochi: شیلانچ), chortan (Armenian: չորթան chort’an), aaruul or khuruud (Mongolian: ааруул or хурууд) is a range of dairy products popular in Egyptian cuisine, Iranian cuisine, Caucasian cuisine, and Central Asian cuisine. Kashk is made from strained yogurt, drained buttermilk (in particular, drained qatiq) or drained sour milk by shaping it and letting it dry. It can be made in a variety of forms: rolled into balls, sliced into strips, and formed into chunks.

There are three main kinds of food products with this name: foods based on curdled milk products like yogurt or cheese; foods based on barley broth, bread, or flour; and foods based on cereals combined with curdled milk.

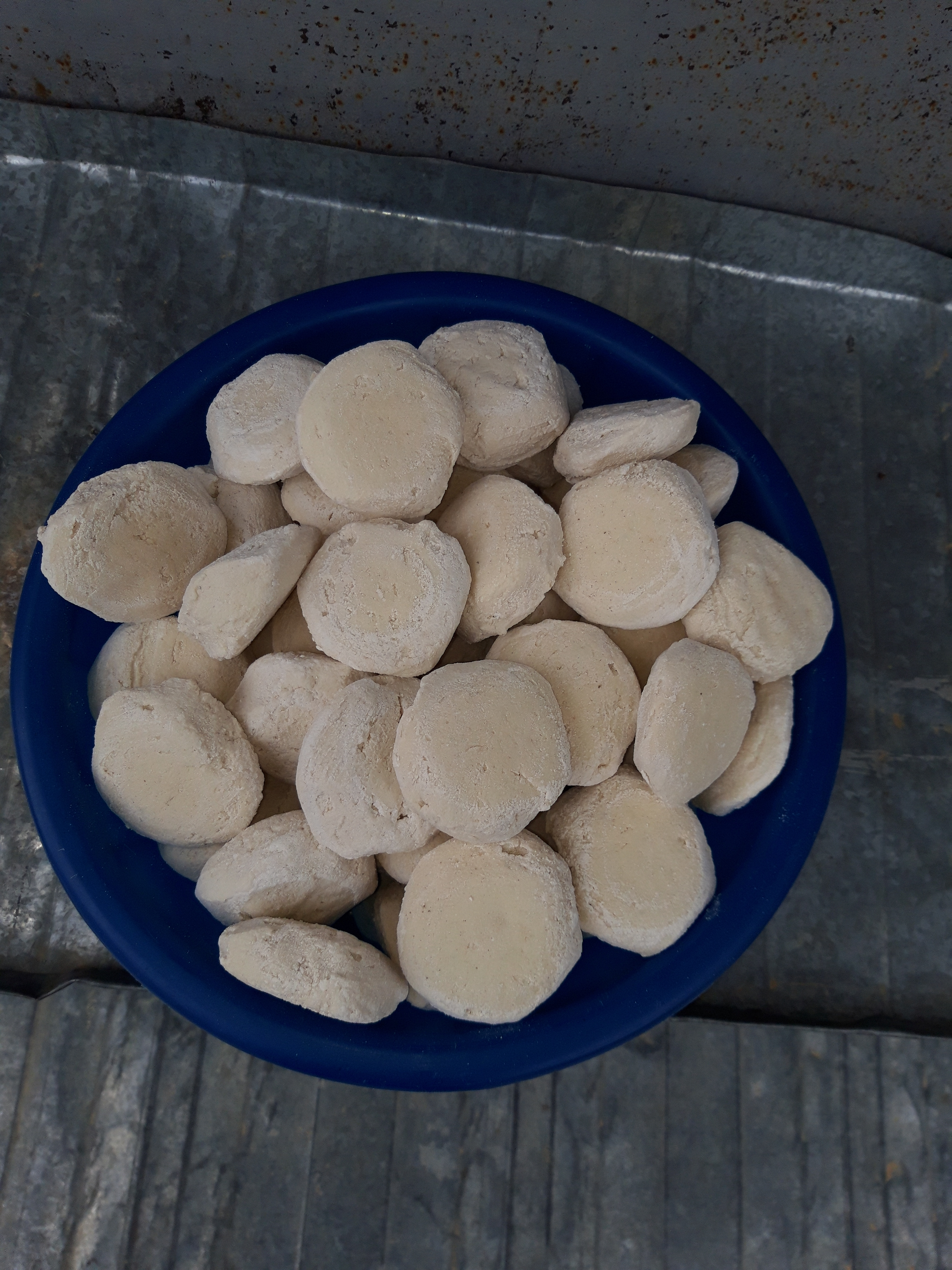
Armenian dried yogurt balls (chortan, չորթան)

== Etymology ==
From Middle Persian (kšk' / kašk), thought to have came from (hwš- / hōš-, "dry") in reference to the fermentation process which involves drying under the sun, The term was loaned to numerous languages including Arabic, Syriac, Turkish, Azerbaijani and many others.

In Turkic languages, it is known as qurut/kurut. Qurut derives from the Turkic verb quru-t ('to make dry').

In Armenian – chortan (chor means "dry", while tan is buttermilk, the leftover liquid from making butter).

== Background ==
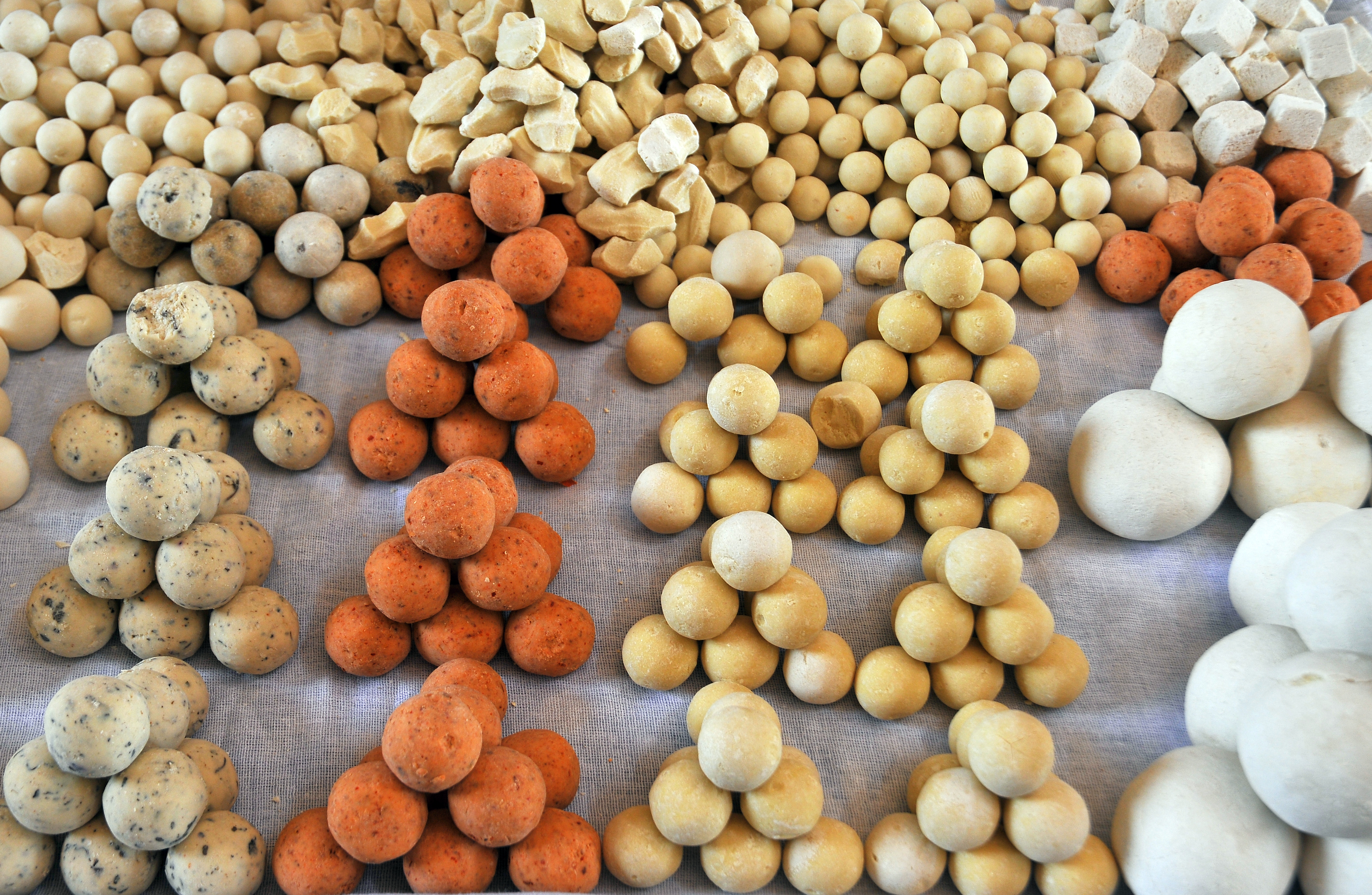
Balls of kashk at Chorsu Bazaar, Tashkent, Uzbekistan

The ancient form of kashk is a porridge of grains fermented with whey and dried in the sun. The long shelf-life and nutritional value of kashk made it a useful item for peasants during the winter months, as well as soldiers and travelers. Kashk is the origin of tarhana found in the moderns cuisines of Turkey and Greece, where it is called trachanas (τραχανάς).

Modern kashk is usually a dish of dried buttermilk that can be crumbled and turned into a paste with water. This coarse powder can be used to thicken soups and stews and improve their flavor, or as an ingredient in various meat, rice or vegetable dishes. Drying allows a longer shelf life for the product.

Kashk is also central to the staple Iranian eggplant dish known as kashk-e bademjan.

== Kashk in different languages and cultures ==
Kashk dairy products can be found in the cuisines of Iran, Tajikistan, Iraq, Syria, Egypt, the Caucasus. In some languages it is called kashk or kishkh, (Persian: کشک, Tajik: қурут, Arabic: كشك, Kurdish: keşk, Turkish: keş peyniri), qurut in others (Tajik: қурут,Kazakh: құрт, Turkish: kurut, Turkmen: gurt, Uzbek: qurt, Kyrgyz: курут, Pashto: قروت/توروې, Shor: қурут, Khakas: хурут). There are many varied names for this class of dishes including jameed (Arabic: جميد), chortan (Armenian: չորթան) and aaruul, khuruud (Mongolian: ааруул, хурууд). Chortan is mentioned in the 19th century Armenian epic poem Daredevils of Sassoun, said to be based on an 8th-century oral tradition.

According to Francoise Aubaile-Sallenave, the first known literary use of the term comes from the Armenian historian Yeghishe. The word Kashk is also mentioned in the Middle Persian text Xusraw ud rēdag in adjectival form: ārd ī kaškēn. the 10th-century Persian Shahnameh ("Book of Kings") by Firdausi the term is used in the sense of "barley flour", but it is also used for a mixture of cracked wheat and cracked barley. Aubaile-Sallenave argues that the original Persian kashk known from early Persian literature was made with barley that contained either a mix of leaven with water or some fermented milk. To answer questions about the modern meaning in Iran for a dried dairy dish, she argued, "Iranian speaking pastorialists, for whom dried sour milk was a staple, and who had no easy access to barley, applied the word kashk by analogy to dry sour milk". Charles Perry offers an alternate explanation based on the 13th century Arabic cookbook Wasf al-Atimah al-Mutadah which says dried yogurt was a Turkomen-style kashk.

A 10th-century Arabic cookbook describes two types of kashk, one made of wheat and leaven and another of sour milk. By the Middle Ages the word had two meanings, one referring to barley flour or a mix of barley and cracked wheat, and another to mean a meat or fowl dish cooked overnight (kashak or kashk).

== Preparation ==
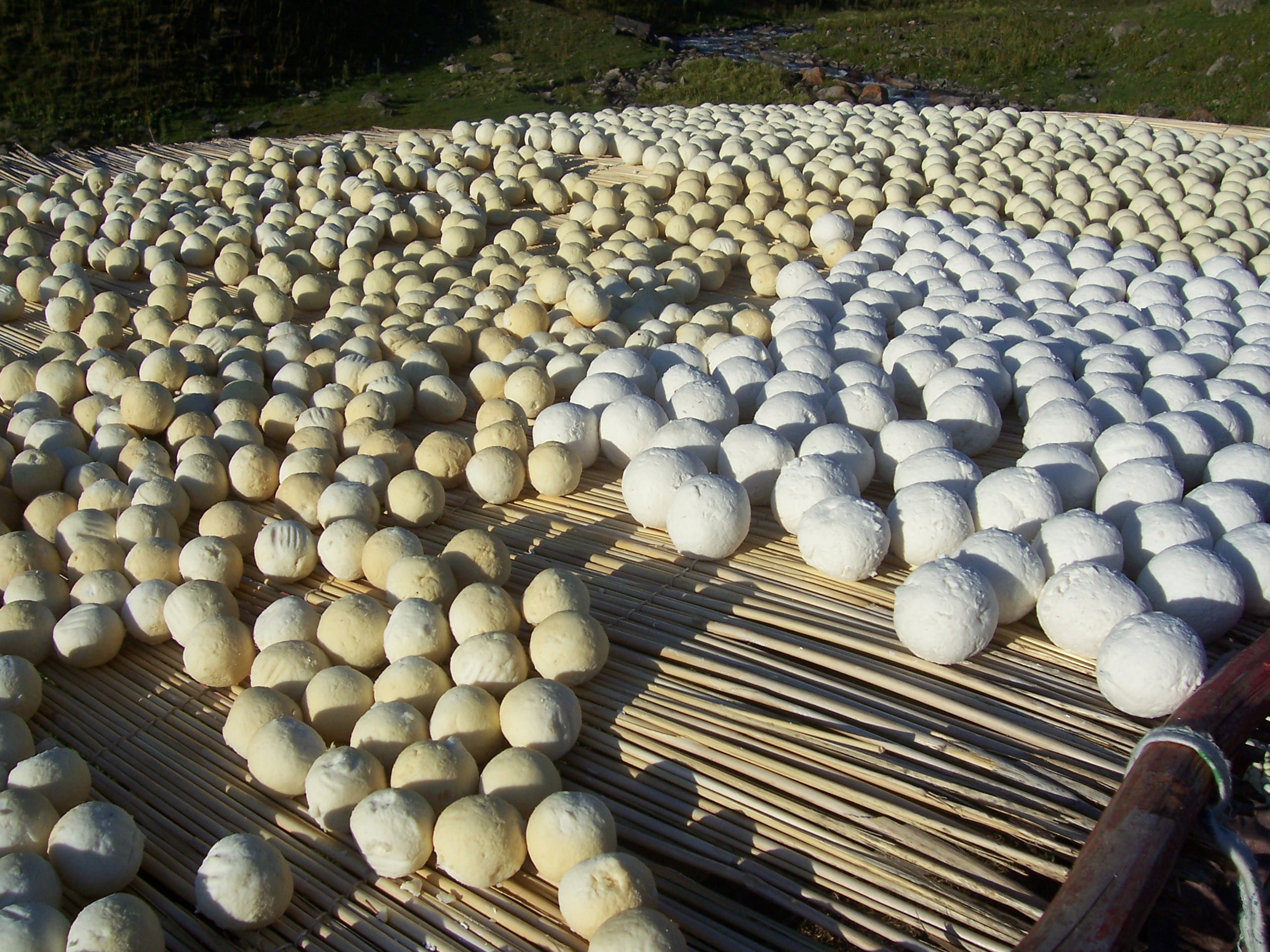
Preparation of qurut in Kyrgyzstan

To make the dried yogurt qurut a traditional or modern method can be used. For the modern method, sour yogurt is blended until smooth, then boiled and strained. It is left to ferment in a warm oven for several days, then the moisture is strained and blended with salt to make the kashk. The drained liquid can be used to make qaraqurut ("dried black whey").

For traditionally prepared qurut water is added to full fat yogurt and poured into a goatskin "churn" - a sack hung from a tripod that is swung back and forth until the milk separates into a type of butter and buttermilk. The buttermilk is boiled and drained to obtain curd which is dried in the sun over a period of weeks to make qurut. While traveling in the Baluchistan English explorer Ernest Ayscoghe Floyer encountered this form of kashk:

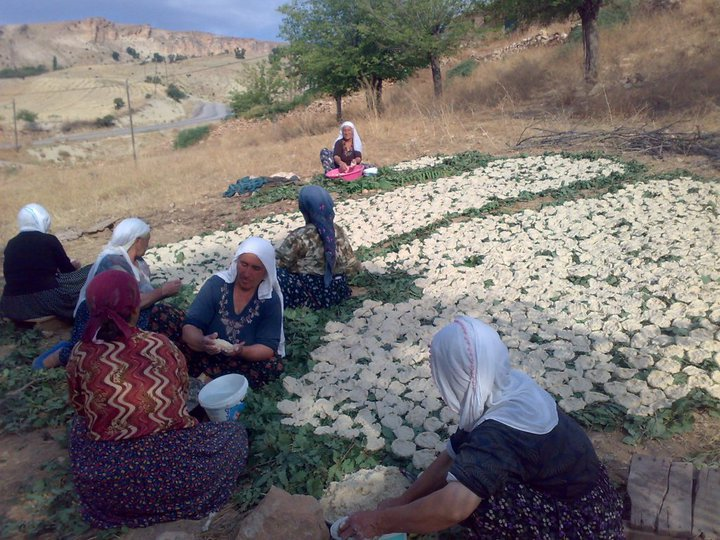
Kurdish women preparing kashk in a village in Turkey

...from the butter manufacture is left the buttermilk called "dōgh." This is boiled, and the remainder is "luch"; this is pressed and dried, and becomes "shilanch", or in Persian, "kashk," a hard, white biscuit of very sour cheese. This is powdered, and, boiled with savory herbs, is very palatable.

When kashk is made with grain in the Armenian, Arab and Turkish cuisines strained yogurt is added to grain and stored until it begins to ferment. After being left to dry in the sun for over a week it is turned into a coarse powder by rubbing and sifting.

== Regional cuisines ==
=== Egypt ===
Keshk (Egyptian Arabic: كشك), also called labba (لبة) in parts of Egypt, is a traditional part of Egyptian cuisine, combining grains and dairy. In Egypt, multiple forms of keshk exist, including keshk sa‘idi (كشك صعيدي), prominent in Upper Egypt, keshk siyami (كشك صيامي), a fasting variation made by Coptic Christians who abstain from animal products, and keshk matrouhi (كشك مطروحي), originating from the coastal Marsa Matrouh region.

Keshk siyami, consumed by Coptic Christians during fasting periods, replaces milk with fermented squash. Keshk matrouhi, from Marsa Matrouh, substitutes cow or water buffalo milk with goat's milk and replaces wheat with barley, adapting to the region’s reliance on rain-fed agriculture. The integration of fig and olive trees with barley cultivation and goat herding supports sustainable production in the area.

The preparation of keshk sa‘idi involves multiple fermentation stages. Fresh milk is placed in a goat pelt called kerba (قربة), where it is churned to separate butter from buttermilk, laban kerba (لبن قربة) or laban khad (لبن خض). The butter is further processed into ghee, while the buttermilk is transferred to an earthenware container called zeer (زير) for fermentation, producing laban zeer (لبن زير). In the next stage, wheat is added, changing the mixture’s color and texture while increasing its probiotic content. The softened wheat forms a porridge-like consistency, which is then dried, crushed, and reintroduced to the fermentation process before being shaped into pieces and sun-dried on reed mats or inside clay rooms.

=== Caucasus ===
Matzoon in Armenia and mats'oni in Georgia, is a commonly used ingredient in Caucasian cuisine. One of the ways matzoon is used is for the production of butter. When matsun is churned it separates from the buttermilk. By boiling and churning the buttermilk one obtains ricotta cheese. The product obtained by drying the ricotta clots is called chortan; chor means "dry" and tan means "buttermilk" in the Armenian language.

In Azerbaijan, qurut is made in a similar way from strained yogurt. Yogurt (qatiq) is made from fresh milk and strained to make suzma qatiq. When the buttermilk "whey" has been separated from the butter using traditional methods the buttermilk curds are formed into small balls and dried in the sun. In western parts of Azerbaijan boiled flat dough is layered with a qurut white sauce and chicken to make Azerbaijani xəngəl.

=== Central Asia ===
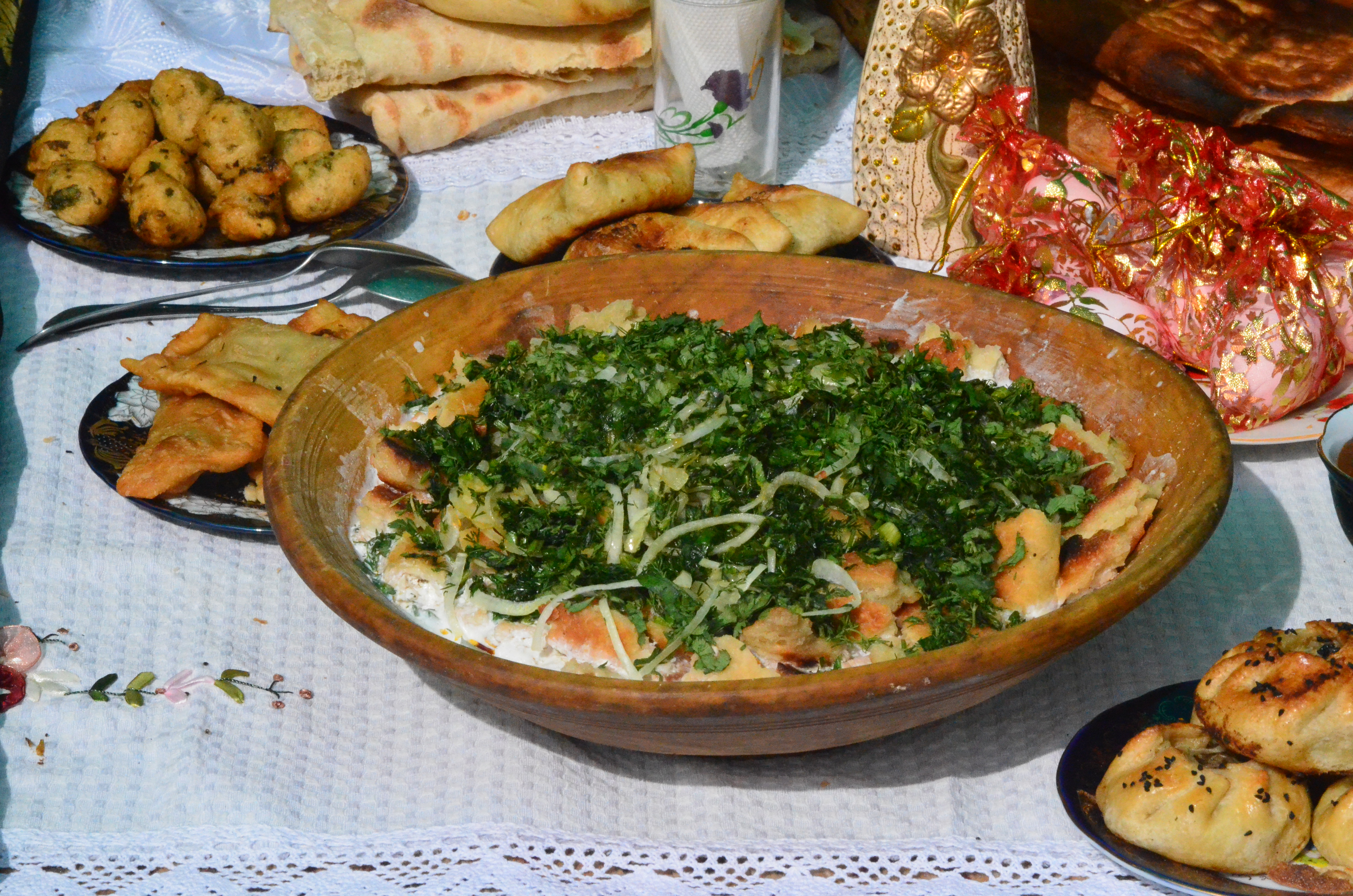
Qurutob from Tajik cuisine

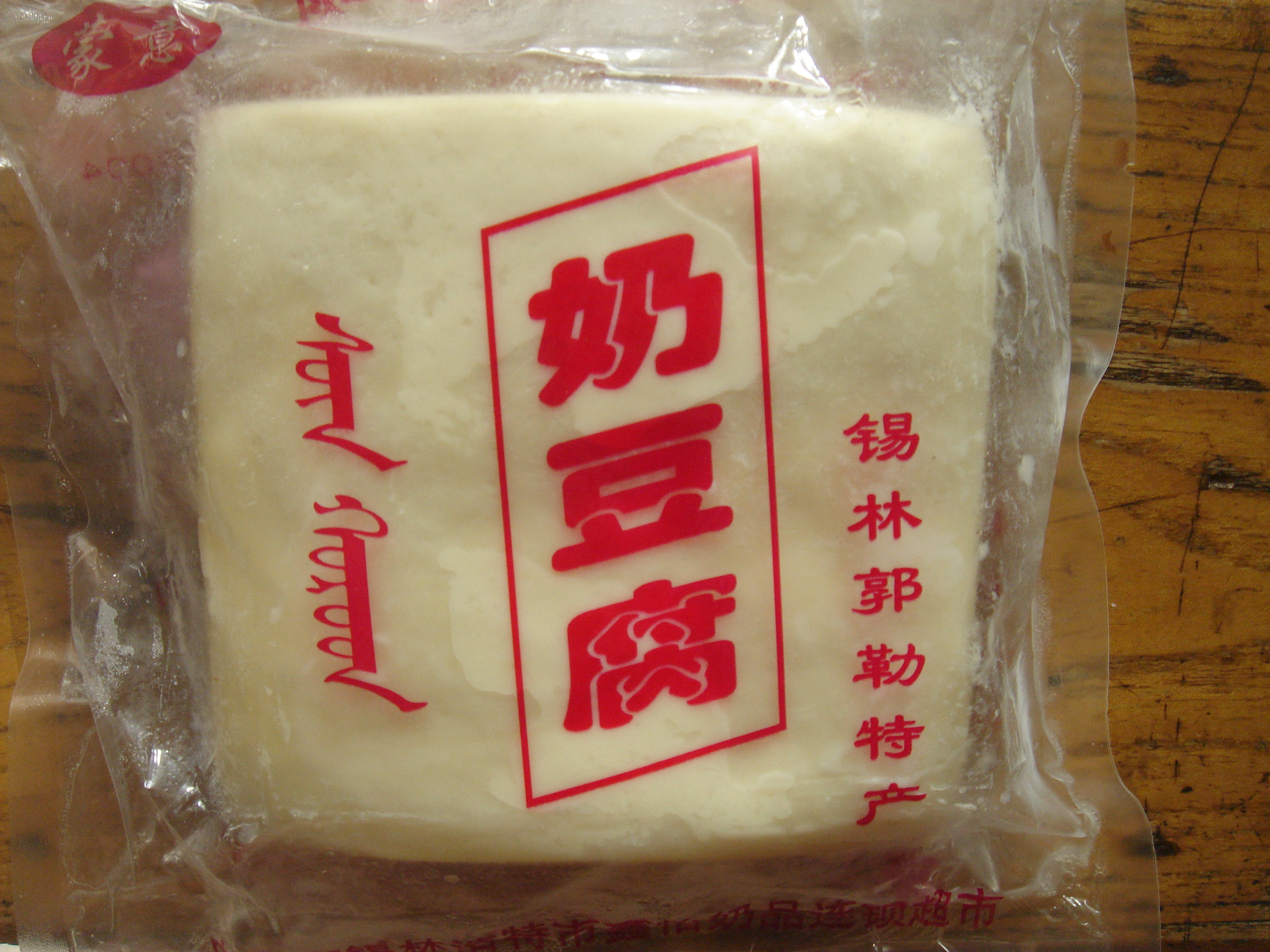
Milk tofu (ᠬᠤᠷᠤᠳ, 奶豆腐) from Xilingol League, Inner Mongolia, often used to prepare dessert

Qurut dissolved in water is a primary ingredient of qurutob, which is thought of by some as the national dish of Tajikistan. One of the main dishes in Afghanistan is kichree qurut, made with mung beans, rice and qurut dissolved in water. It is sometimes salted, and in Mongolia, aaruul can be flavoured as well as having many different shapes, sizes and textures (soft to rock-hard). It can be generally categorized into sweetened or unsweetened aaruul. It can also be categorized by its shape and size, by its hardness and its origin.

=== Iran ===
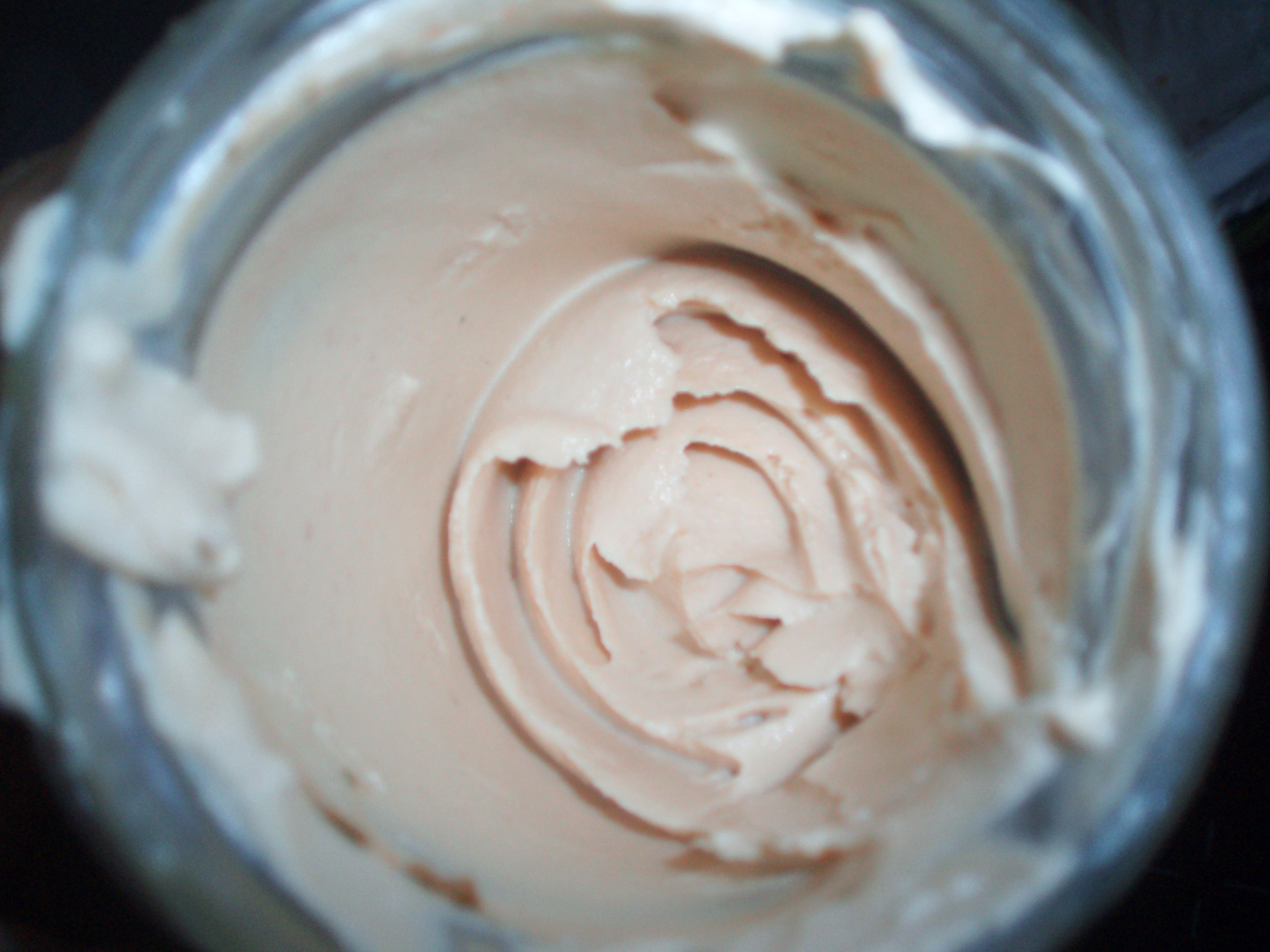
Iranian kashk

Kashk has been a staple in the Iranian diet for thousands of years. In modern Iran, kashk is a thick whitish liquid similar to whey or sour cream, used in traditional Persian and Kurdish cuisine, like ash reshteh, kashk e badamjan, kale joush. It is available as a liquid or in a dried form, which needs to be soaked and softened before it can be used in cooking. Kashk was traditionally produced from the leftovers of cheese-making (more specifically, the milk used to make it). The procedure is, subtracting butter from milk, the remainder is doogh which can be used as the base for kashk. The water is subtracted from this whitish beverage and what remains is kashk which can be dried. Iranian kashk has made an appearance in US markets in the past half-century by several Iranian grocers starting with Kashk Hendessi.

=== Turkey ===
In Turkey, kashk is a dried yogurt product also known as keş peyniri, kurut, taş yoğurt, kuru yoğurt, or katık keşi. Its contents and production vary by region. In western and northern Turkey, especially in Bolu, the product is categorized as a cheese owing to its shape and white color. In eastern Turkey, especially Erzincan, Erzurum, and Kars, kurut is produced from skimmed yogurt made from the whey left over from production of butter by the yayık method, and then crushed or rolled. In parts of southeastern Turkey with a significant Kurdish population, it is called keşk. All versions of this dairy product are salty. It is used as an ingredient in soups. There is also a closely related dried food product called tarhana which is based on a fermented mixture of grain and yogurt or fermented milk.

=== Levant and Arabian Peninsula ===
In Lebanon, Jordan, Arabian Peninsula, and Syria, kishk is a powdery cereal of burghul (cracked wheat) fermented with milk and laban (yogurt), usually from goat milk. It is easily stored and is valuable to the winter diet of isolated villagers or country people. Kishk is prepared in early autumn following the preparation of burghul. Milk, laban, and burghul are mixed well together and allowed to ferment for nine days. In Lebanon, the mix is salted and traditionally set to ferment in large clay jars for up to three weeks, during which it is regularly kneaded. Each morning the mixture is thoroughly kneaded with the hands. When fermentation is complete the kishk is spread on a clean cloth to dry, notably on the rooftops of rural dwellings. Finally it is rubbed well between the hands until it is reduced to a powder, sieved, and then stored in a dry place.

In Lebanese cuisine, kishk is commonly used to this day, mixed with tomato paste, as a topping for manakish, a sort of flatbread cooked in an open oven and eaten for breakfast or a lunch. Traditionally, it would also be served with eggs, as a kibbeh stuffing, or in a soup, possibly with lamb meat fried in its own fat (awarma).

In Jordan a dried yogurt similar to kashk called jameed is commonly used. Elsewhere in the Levant, similar products are referred to as drained labneh (labneh malboudeh).

A 10th-century recipe for kishk recorded in the Kitab al-Tabikh was made by par-boiling dehulled wheat, milling it, and blending it with chickpea flour. Yeast, salt and water were added to make a dough from the flour, which was left in the sun for around two weeks, and re-moistened with sour yogurt (or sour grape juice) as needed. After 15 days the dough would be seasoned with mint, purslane, cilantro, rue, parsley, garlic and the leafy tops of leeks, shaped into disks, and allowed to dry in the sun.

== See also ==
- Iranian cuisine
- Bocconcini
- Frumenty
- Gachas, a Lathyrus gruel consumed since ancient times in parts of the Iberian Peninsula
- Kasha
- Keşkek, a related meat-and-grain stew in Iranian, Turkish and Greek cuisines
- List of yogurt-based dishes and beverages

== Bibliography ==
- Karabulut I., Hayaloğlu A. A., Yıldırım H. Thinlayer drying characteristics of kurut, a Turkish dried dairy by-product. Int J Food Sci Technol, 42 (2007), 1080–1086.
- Françoise Aubaile-Sallenave, Al-Kishk: the past and present of a complex culinary practice, in Sami Zubaida and Richard Tapper, A Taste of Thyme: Culinary Cultures of the Middle East, London and New York, 1994 and 2000, ISBN 1-86064-603-4.
- Liu W J, Sun Z H, Zhang Y B, Zhang C L, Menghebilige, Yang M, Sun T S, Bao Q H, Chen W, Zhang H P. A survey of the bacterial composition of kurut from Tibet using a culture-independent approach. J Dairy Sci. 2012 Mar, 95(3), 1064–72. doi:10.3168/jds.2010-4119.
