= Talkhan =

Afghan sweet

- Course: Dessert
- Place of origin: Afghanistan
- Main ingredients: Walnuts, red or white mulberry

Talkhan is an Afghan Tajik local sweet, made from walnut and red or white mulberry. Talkhan are said to resemble chocolate, only they are lighter and coarser. Talkhan is mainly produced in the Hindukush mountain valleys, specially Panjshir Province.

British soldiers in Afghanistan during the 19th century observed that Afghan militants would rely on talkhan as a ration. During the Soviet invasion of Afghanistan, talkhan was an important portable energy source for the Mujahaddin fighting against the Russians. Easy to make and with a long shelf life, this primordial "energy bar" kept hundreds of fighters from starving in the rugged mountains of Panjshir. There are reports of Russian soldiers claiming that the Mujahaddin were eating "stones" due to that hardness of dried talkhan and the light to dark brown color resulting from white and red mulberries used along with walnuts to make talkhan.
