= Tajik cuisine =

Traditional cuisine of Tajikistan

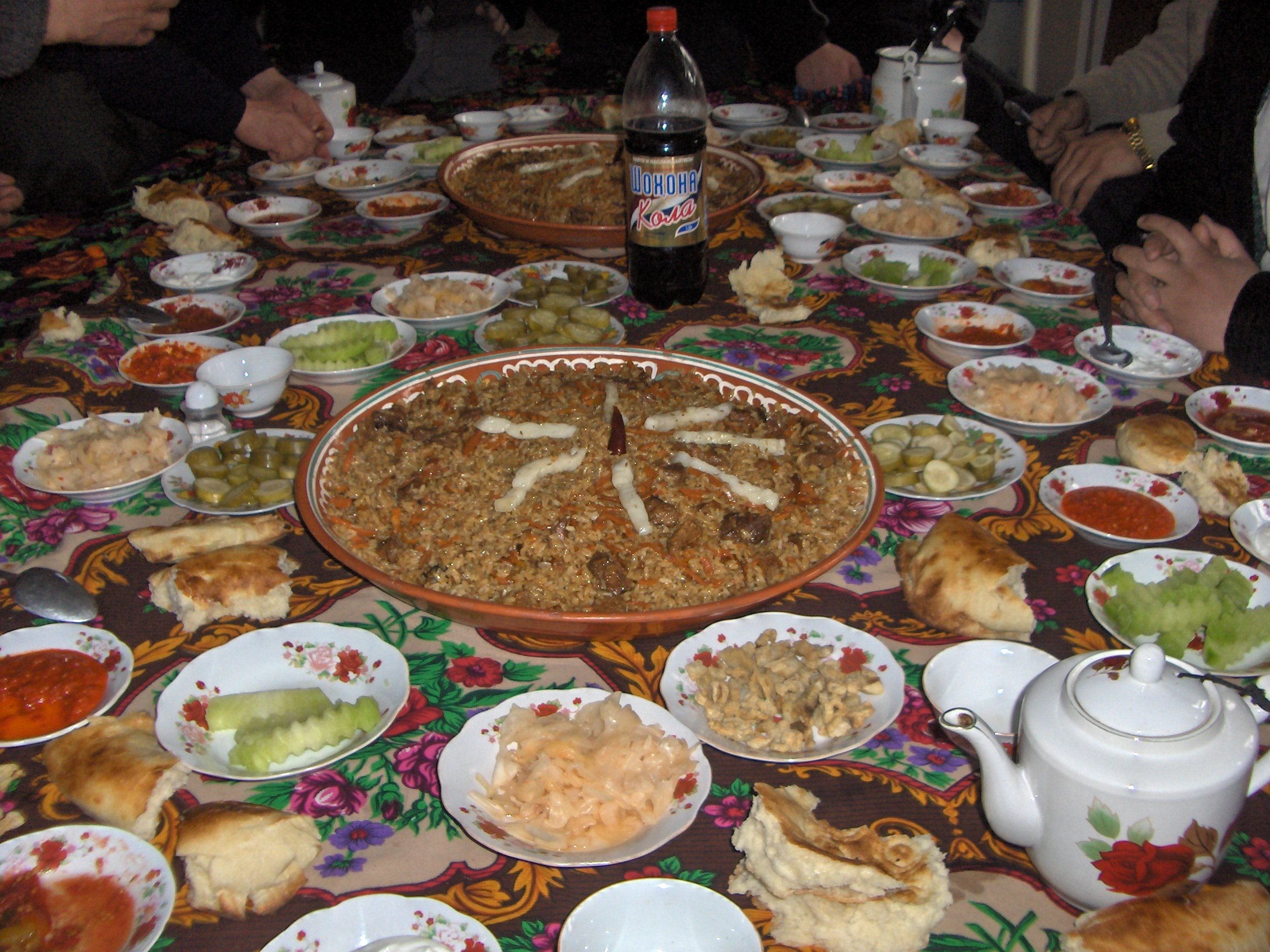
Table with oshi palov

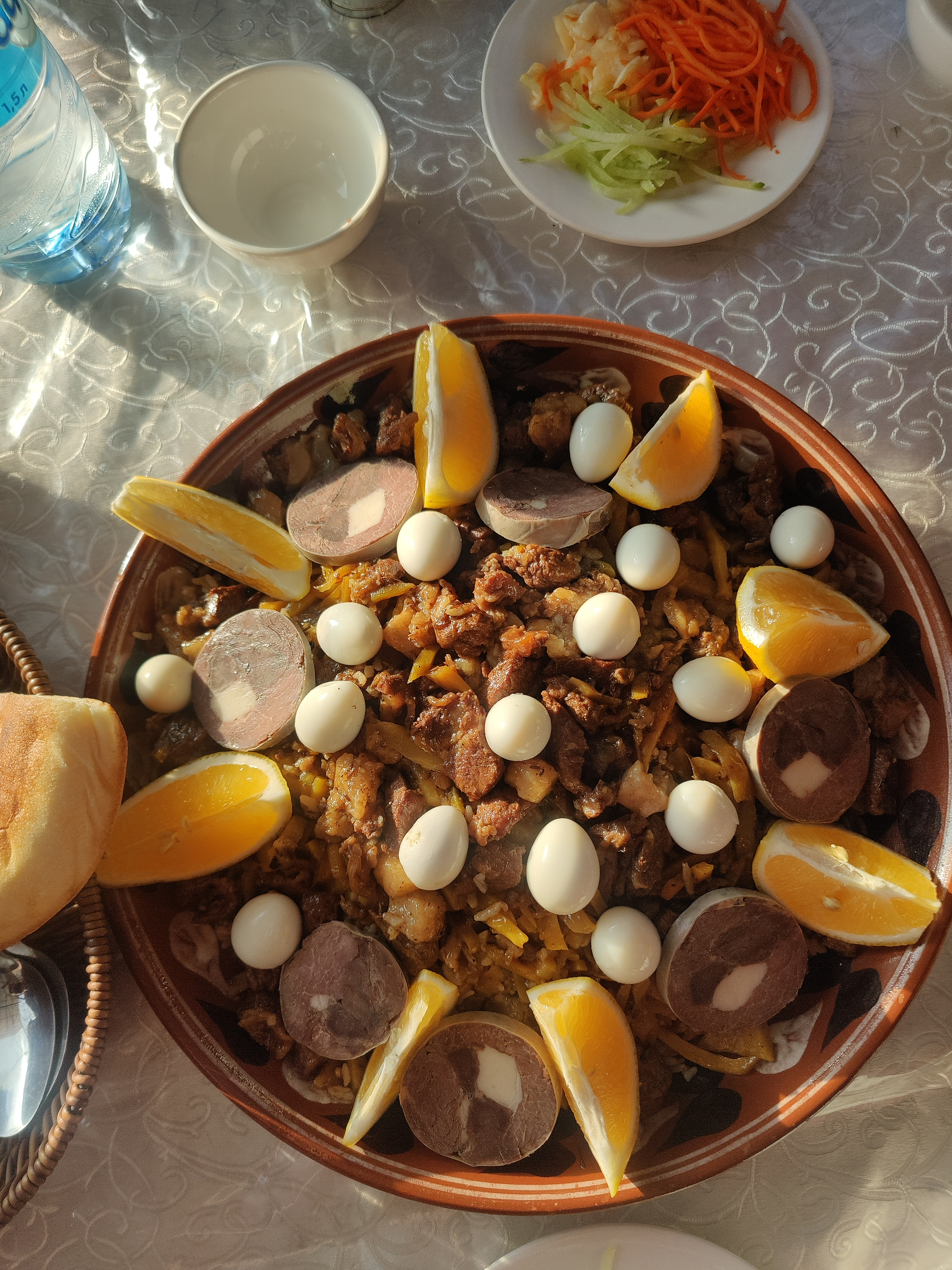
Tajik pilaf with lamb and quail eggs

Tajik cuisine is a traditional cuisine of Tajikistan, and has much in common with Iranian, Afghan, Russian, Chinese, and Uzbek cuisines. Palov or palav (pilaf) (Tajik: палав), also called osh (ash) (Tajik: ош), is the national dish in Tajikistan, as in other countries in the region. Green tea (Tajik: чойи кабуд) is the common national drink.

== Common foods and dishes ==
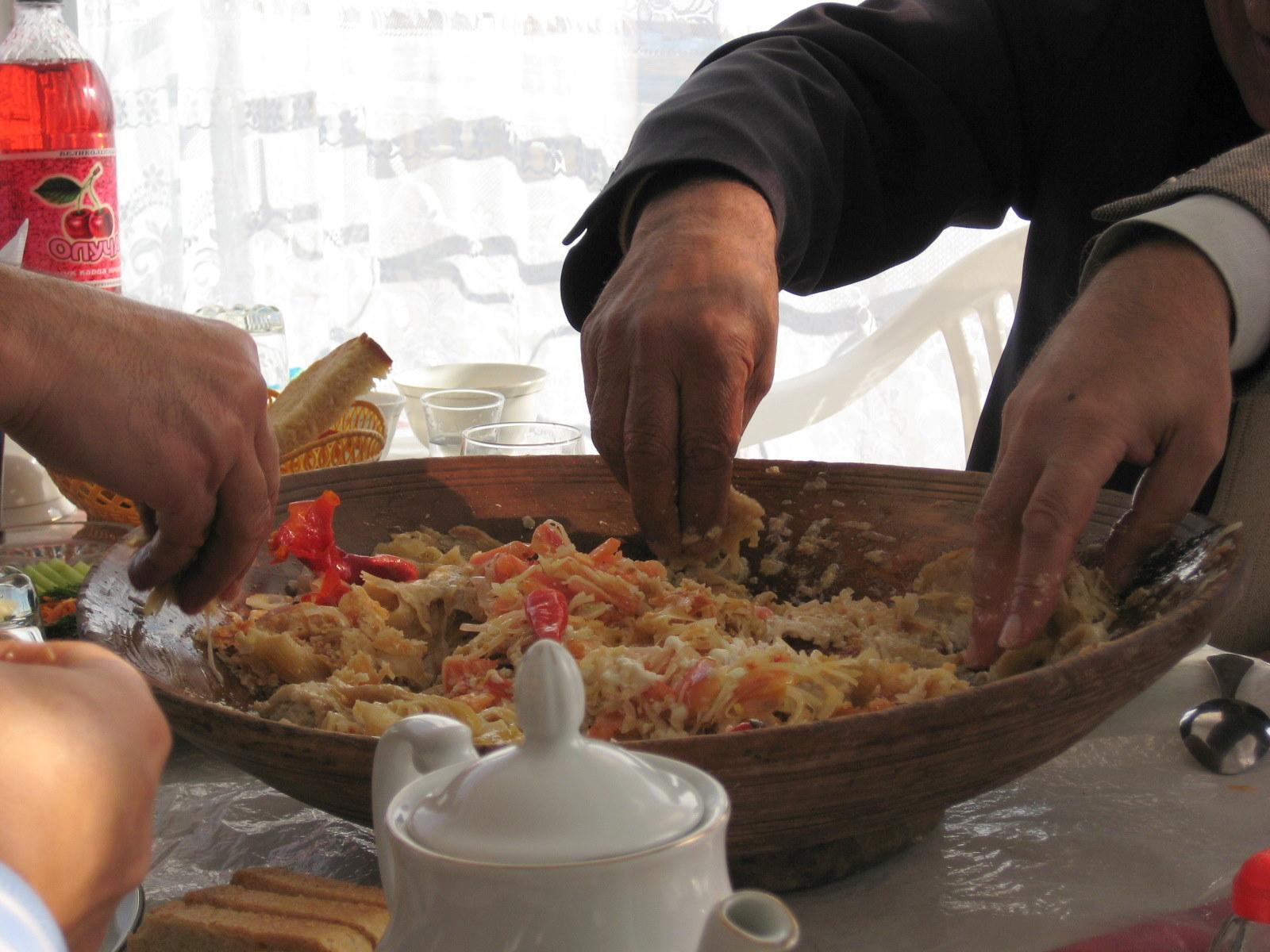
Eating qurutob the traditional way: with one's hands

Palav or osh, generically known as plov (pilaf), is a rice dish made with julienned carrot, and pieces of meat, all fried together in vegetable oil or mutton fat in a special cookware called deg (a wok-shaped cauldron) over an open flame. The meat is cubed before or after being cooked, the carrots can be yellow or orange, and the rice is colored yellow or orange by the frying carrots and the oil. The dish is eaten communally from a single large plate placed at the center of the table, often in with one's hands in the traditional way.

Another traditional dish that is still eaten with hands from a communal plate is qurutob (Tajik: қурутоб), whose name describes the preparation method: qurut (Tajik: қурут, dried balls of salty cheese) is dissolved in water (Tajik: об, ob) and the liquid is poured over strips of а thin flaky flatbread (patyr or fatir, Tajik: фатир, or more accurately фатир равғанӣ, fatir ravghani, i.e., fatir made with butter or tallow for flakiness). Before serving the dish is topped with onions fried in oil until golden and topped with fresh seasonal vegetables. No meat is added. Qurutob is considered a national dish, predominantly consumed in the southern regions.

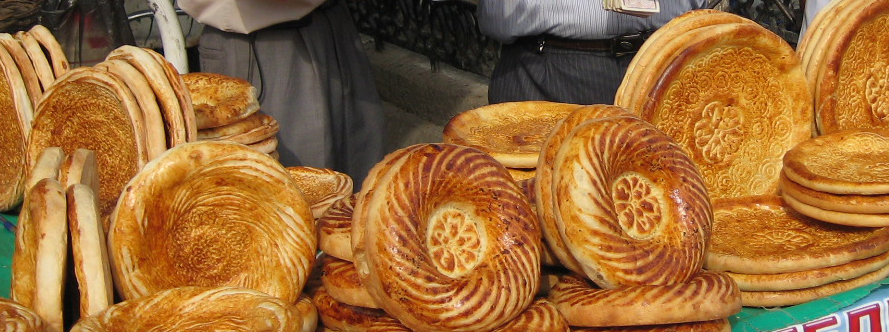
A selection of traditional non at the market.

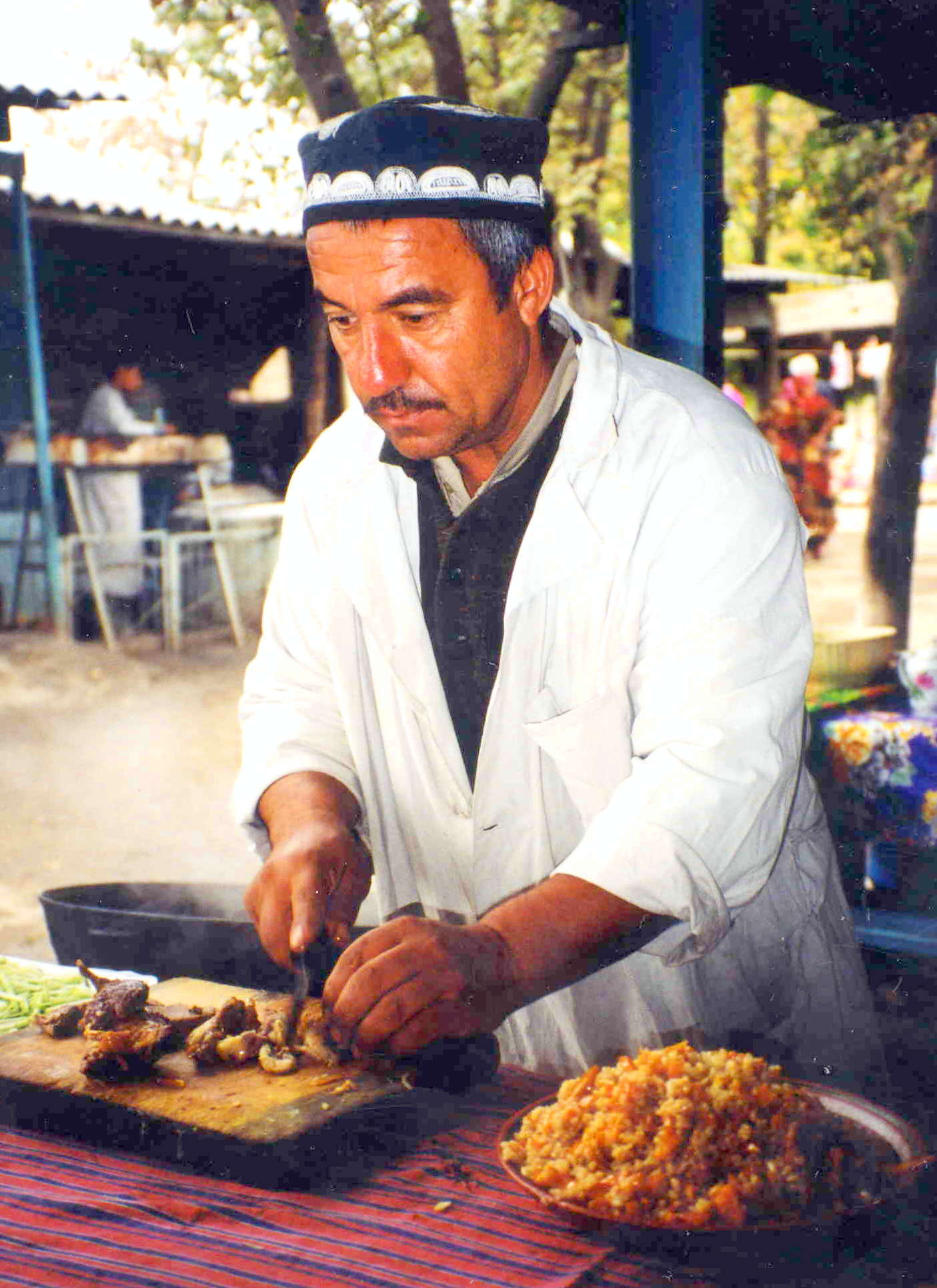
A Tajik man makes plov.

Meals are almost always served with non (Tajik: нон), flatbread found throughout Central Asia. If a Tajik has food but not non, he will say he is out of food. If non is dropped on the ground, people will put it up on a high ledge for beggars or birds. Legend holds that one is not supposed to put non upside down because this will bring bad luck. The same holds if anything is put on top of the non, unless it is another piece of non.

Breakfast usually consists of tea, kulcha (Tajik milk bread) or non with butter, hasib (sausage), panir (Feta cheese), qaymoq or sarshir, murabbā (jam), tukhmbiryān (omelettes with meat), etc. Fruits such as berries, grapes, melons, apples, peaches, and apricots are eaten too during the summer. Kompot (a non-alcoholic sweet beverage that may be served hot or cold and is made with fruits) is often drunk as well.

Traditional Tajik soups include mainly meat and vegetable soups (such as shūrbā and piti), and meat soups with noodles (such as laghmon and ugro). Other dishes shared regionally, either as fast food or as an appetizer, include manti (steamed meat dumplings), tushbera (pelmeni), sambusa (a triangular pastry with either a meat and onion stuffing or a pumpkin and onion stuffing, baked in a tandoor oven), and belyash (pl. belyashi, Tajik: беляши, deep-fried cakes made of yeast dough and filled with minced meat, similar to pirozhki).

Soviet cuisine both influenced and was in turn influenced by Tajik cuisine.

=== Dairy products ===
Dairy dishes, usually served as part of the spread of appetizers in a Tajik meal and scooped with pieces of flatbread, include chakka (a sour milk preparation), thick yogurt, and kaymak (high-fat clotted cream). Qurut balls may be served as a snack or an accompaniment to cold beverages. Although not a traditional Tajik drink, kefir, a drinking yogurt, is often served with breakfast.

=== Summer produce ===
In the summer, Tajikistan abounds in produce and fruit; its grapes and melons were famous throughout the former Soviet Union. The bazaar also sells pomegranates, apricots, plums, peaches, apples, pears, figs, and persimmons.

== Beverages ==
Tea generally accompanies every meal and is frequently offered between meals as a gesture of hospitality to guests and visitors. It is served hot in a china pot with a lid, and is drunk with sugar from small saucer-less cups without handles (piola). Because of the universal popularity of tea-drinking, the choykhona, or teahouse, is the most common gathering place in Tajikistan, and is similar to the Western-style coffee house.

== See also ==
- Soviet cuisine
- Talkhan
