= Mirza ghassemi =

Iranian seasoned eggplant dish

Mirza Ghassemi
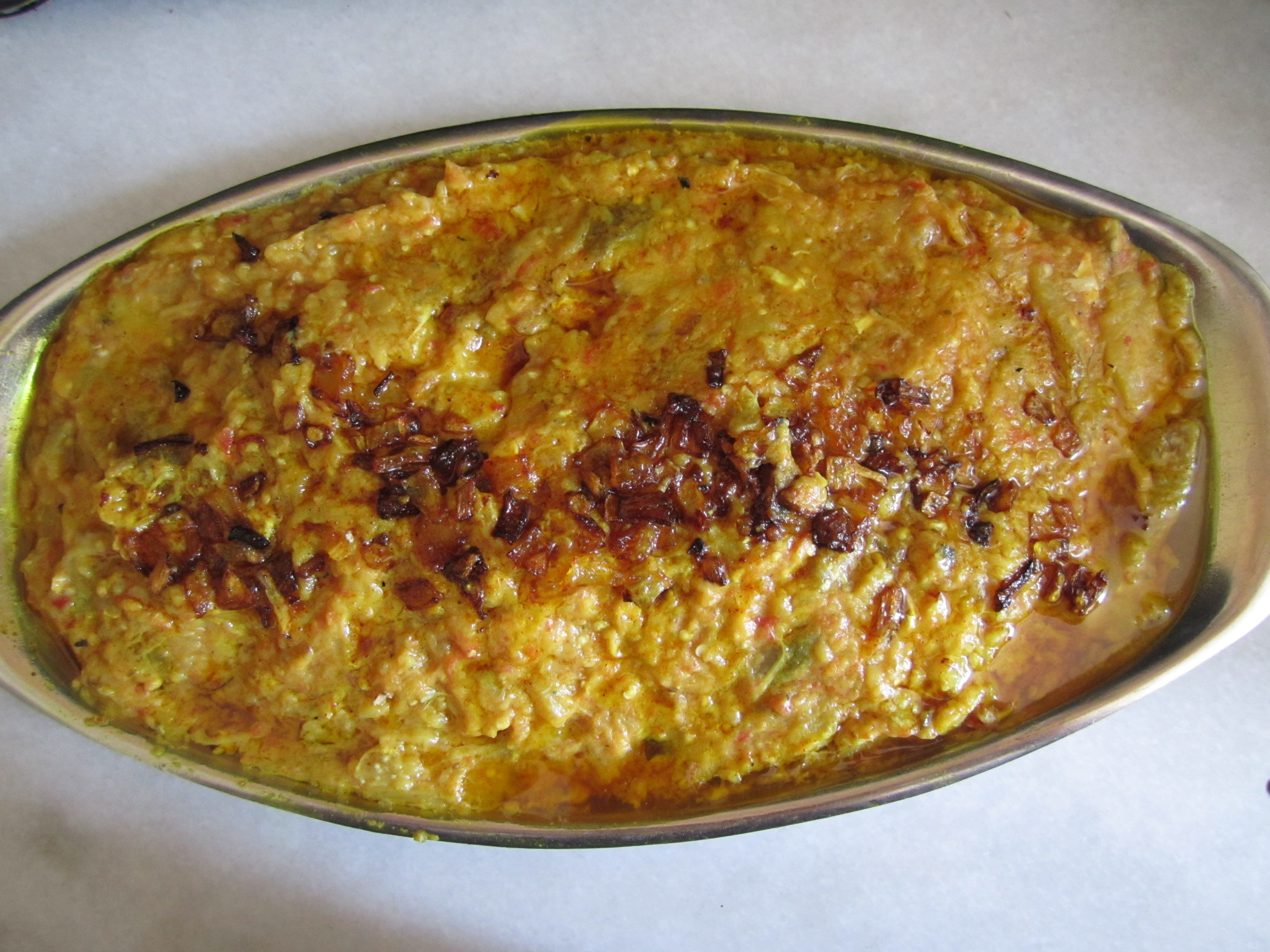
- Course: Hors d'oeuvre
- Place of origin: Iran
- Region or state: Northern Iran (Gilan)
- Main ingredients: Aubergine (eggplant), garlic, tomato, turmeric, oil or butter, salt, pepper, eggs
- Variations: Kadoo qassemi
- Food energy (per serving): 150 kcal (630 kJ)

Mirza ghassemi (Persian: میرزا قاسمی; alternative spelling: mirza qassemi) is an Iranian dish from Gilan, appetizer or main course based on tandoori or grilled aubergine (eggplant), distinct to the Northern Iran and Caspian Sea region (specifically Gilan province).

The dish consists of aubergines seasoned with garlic, tomato, oil or butter, salt, and pepper bound together with eggs. It can be prepared as a casserole, and is usually served with bread or rice. The variant made with zucchini instead of aubergine is called kadoo ghasemi.

== Etymology ==
Mirza ghasemi was invented by Mohammad Qasim Khan, the governor of Rasht during the reign of Nasser al-Din Shah (1848-1896), and was developed by him and named after him. He popularized this dish throughout Gilan under the name of Mirza Ghasemi, and after he was elected to the governorship of Fars, he also popularized it in Fars province.

== See also ==
- Eggplant salads and appetizers
- List of casserole dishes
- List of egg dishes
- List of eggplant dishes
- Kashk e bademjan, another popular Iranian eggplant dish
- Baba ghanoush, a Levantine eggplant dish
- Baingan bharta, a South Asian eggplant dish
