= Qaraqorut =

Fermented dairy product

Qaraqurut (Persian: قراقروط, romanized: Qarāqoruṭ or Persian: قره قروت, romanized: Qare Qorūt, lit. 'Black kashk', from Turkic: Qara "black" and Qurut "Kashk") is a highly acidic brittle dairy product, made by dehydrating sour whey. It appears eponymously black and is produced in Iran, Afghanistan, Tajikistan and other Central Asian countries. Lighter variants and variants made from other kinds of whey do exist. It is sometimes merely called qārā (Persian: قارا) compare Azeri: قارا, black.

== Preparation ==
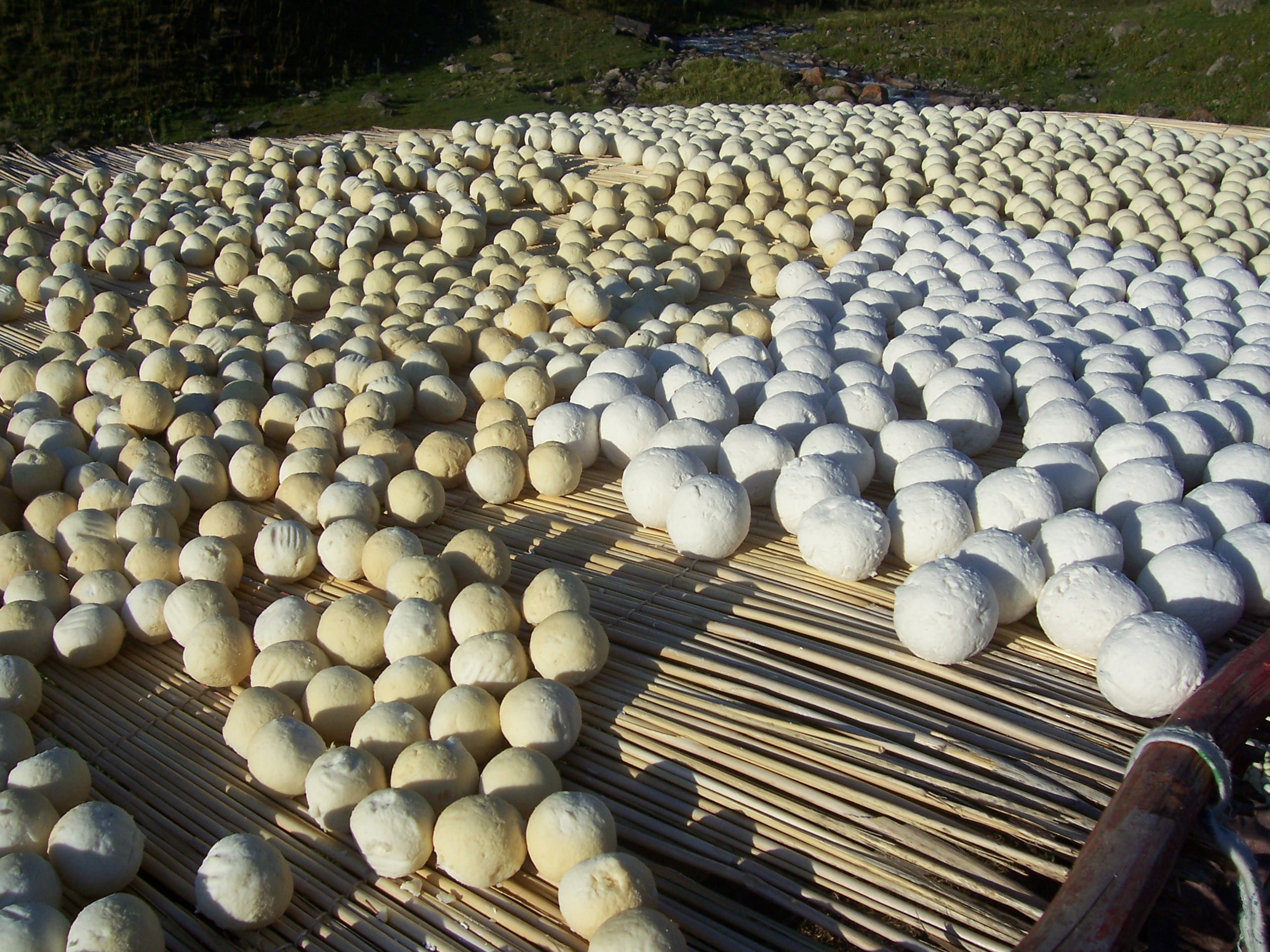
Kashk balls being sun-dried

Qaraqorut is traditionally made from dūġ or Doogh ie curdled fermented buttermilk, produced by adding Kashk water, ie sour whey which contains lactic acid bacteria, to full fat yogurt which is then swung in a goatskin until it separates into butter and dūġ. The dūġ is then boiled to be put into a cheesecloth and strained. In the next step, liquids (Kashk water, ie sour whey) and solids (curd) are separated by gravity, with the liquids being collected in a container under the cheesecloth and the solids being collected therein. The concentrated solid curd is rolled into a ball and then sun-dried. This product is called Kashk or Qorut, a popular dairy product in itself. The strained sour whey left over from this process is boiled together with some fresh milk until it thickens. The thickened mixture is poured out onto a tray and left to dry until it becomes brittle. This brittle substance is Qaraqorut.
