= Hünkârbeğendi =

Turkish dish of pureed eggplant and meat

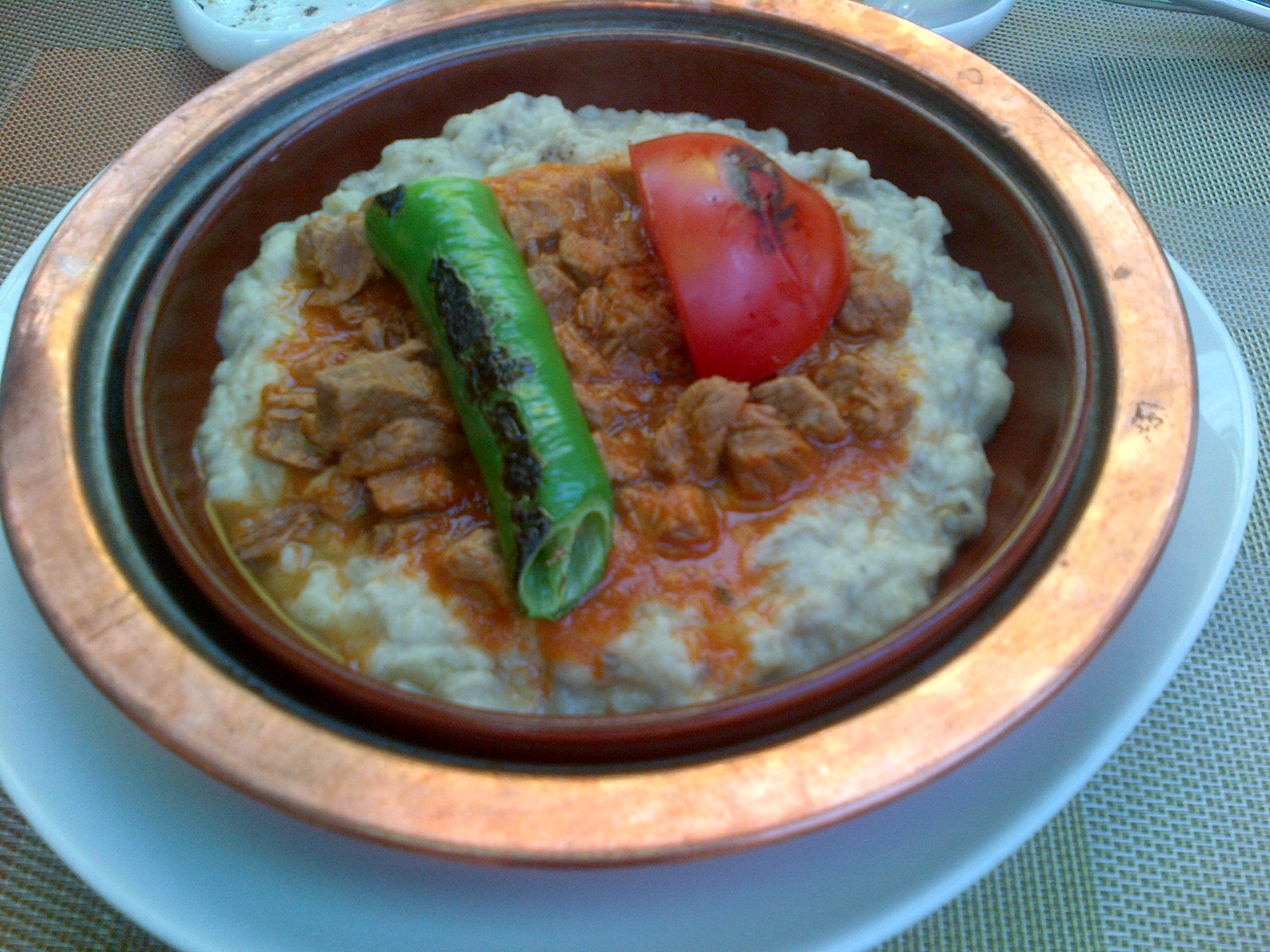

Hünkârbeğendi, or simply beğendi (literally, 'the sovereign is pleased'), is an eggplant and meat (lamb or beef) dish in Ottoman cuisine.

It is made from eggplant grilled until the skin is burned, giving it a smoky flavor. The eggplant is puréed, seasoned and thickened with béchamel sauce. The mixture is then topped with cubes of sauteed or grilled meat.
