= Qurutob =

Dish of Tajik cuisine

Қурутоб
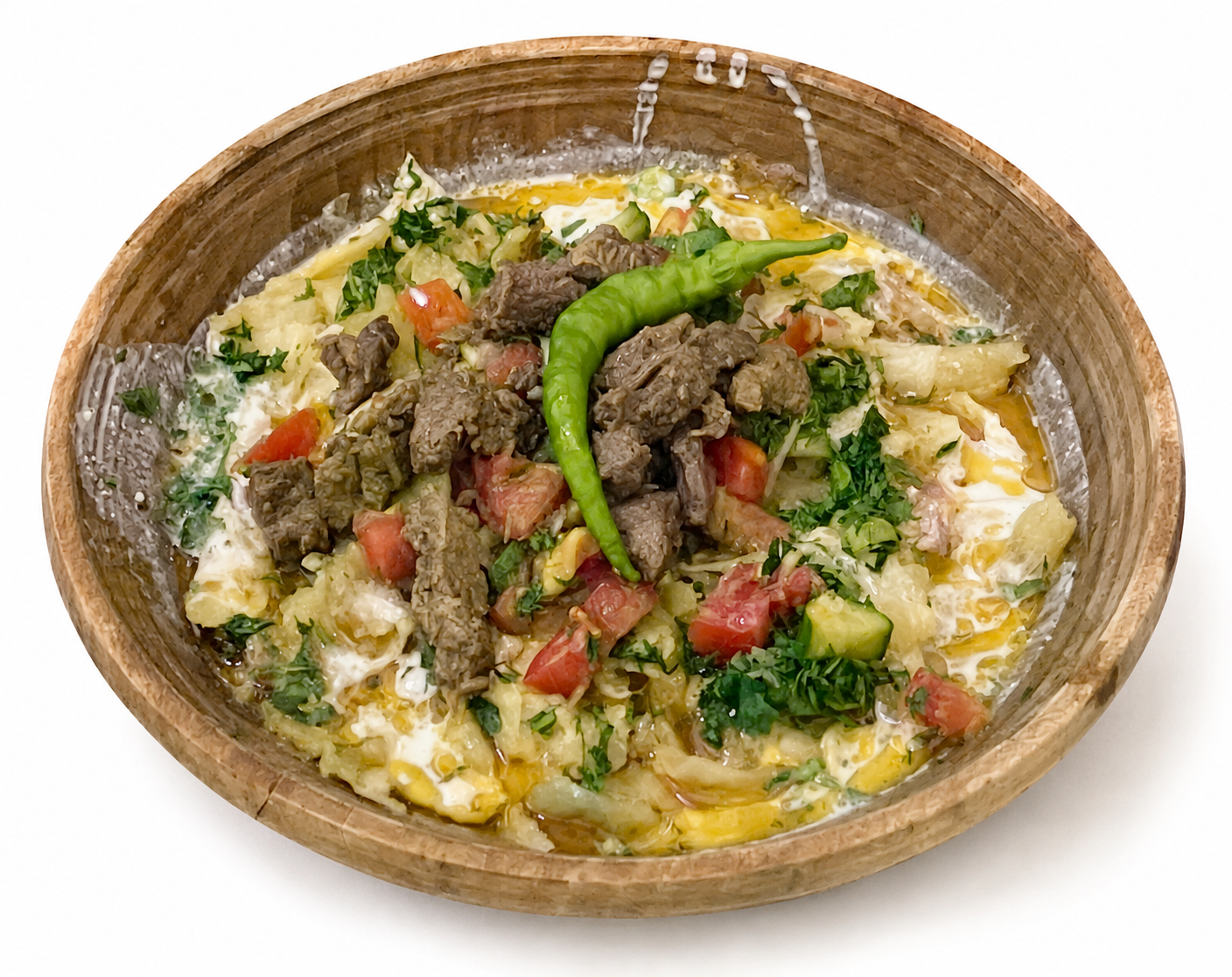
- Kurutob (Qurutob) one of the national meals in Tajikistan
- Course: Main course
- Place of origin: Tajikistan
- Associated cuisine: Tajik cuisine
- Created by: Tajiks
- Main ingredients: Yogurt, fatir (flatbread), tomato, cucumber, greens, onion
- Ingredients generally used: Linseed oil, salt

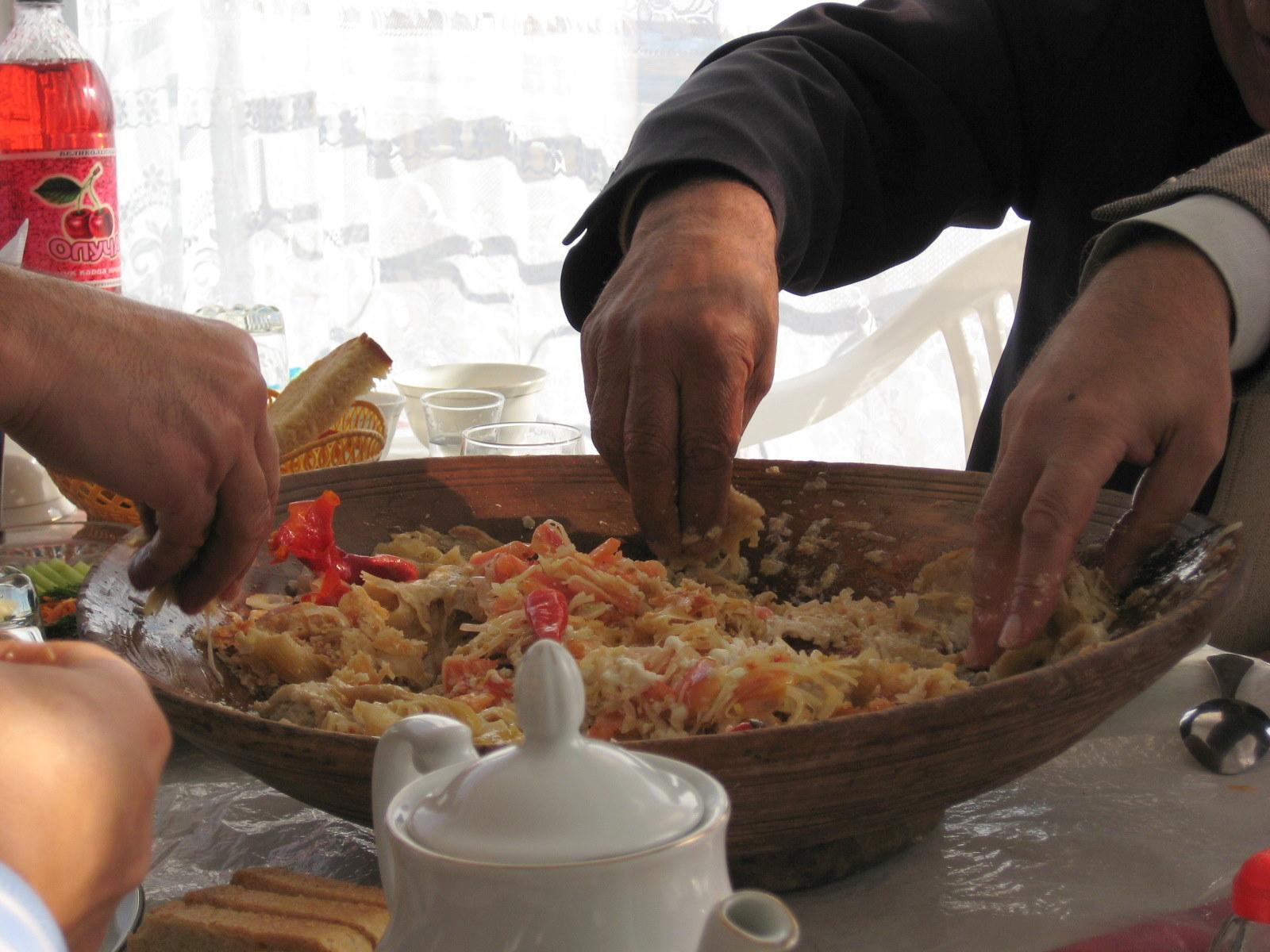
Qurutob being eaten as part of a meal

Qurutob (Tajik: қурутоб) is a dish of Tajik cuisine. Sometimes described as a "bread salad", it is created using qurut, dried balls of cheese, which are soaked in water; the resulting liquid, salty in flavor, is used as the base of the dish. Strips of fatir, a type of flatbread, are then placed on top. The mixture is served on large plates, and is usually topped with a variety of vegetables, such as onions, cucumbers, tomatoes, or herbs; meat or chili peppers are also sometimes seen as garnishes. Qurutob is a shared dish, meant to be eaten with the hands.
