= Kashk bademjan =

Iranian dish

Kashk bademjan کشک بادمجان
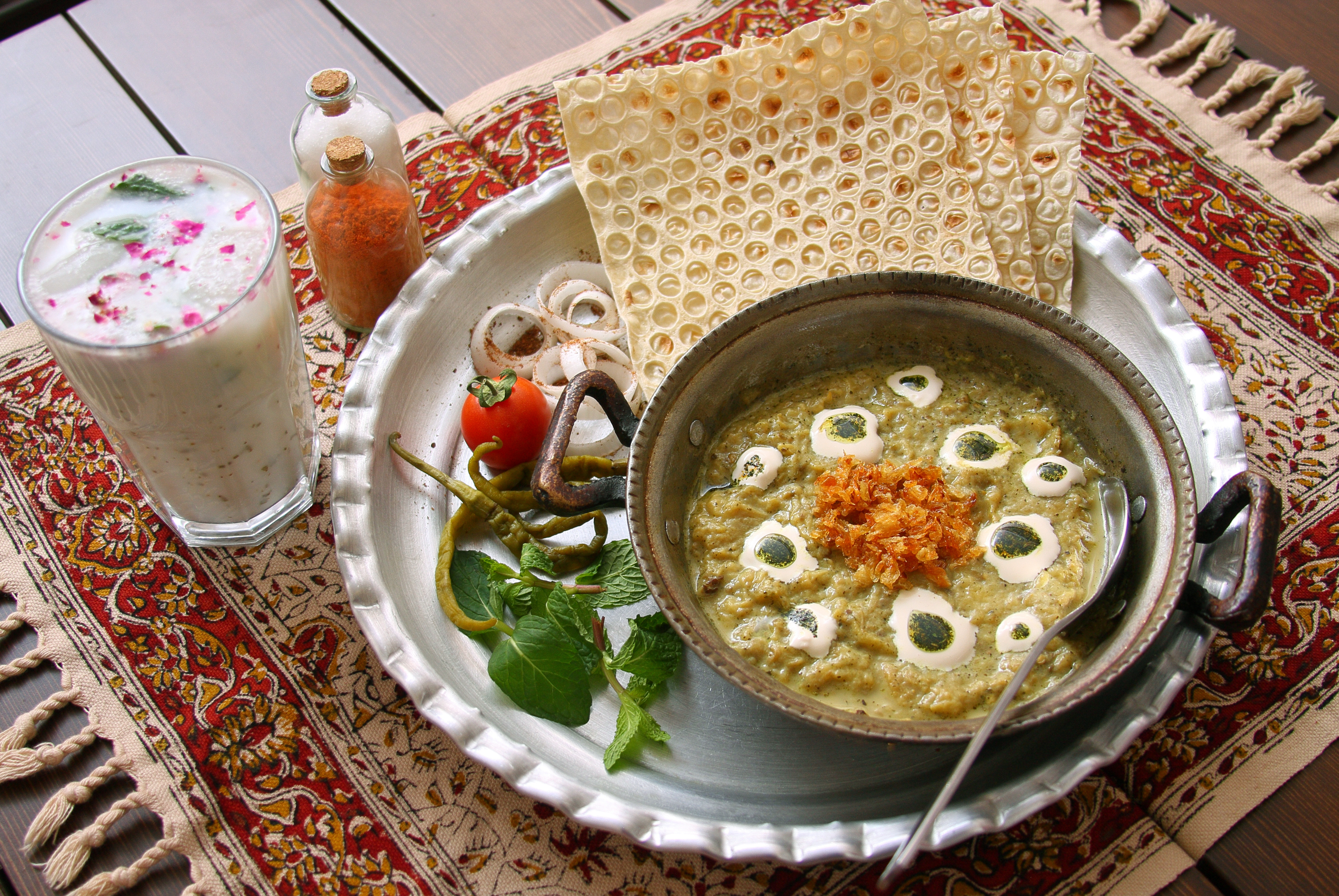
- Kashk bademjan with bread and usual side dishes
- Type: Borani
- Place of origin: Iran
- Invented: Probably from Qajar dynasty
- Serving temperature: Both hot and cold
- Main ingredients: Eggplant and kashk

Kashk bademjan (Persian: کشک بادمجان), alternatively kashk-e bademjan or Kashk-o bademjan (Persian: کشک و بادمجان), is a staple Iranian dish made with "kashk and eggplant" – also the literal translation of its Persian language name. The dish is served as a dip and typically garnished with liquid saffron, sautéed onions, garlic and often walnuts. It can be consumed either as an appetizer or a main dish, and is typically eaten with fresh bread.

== Gallery ==
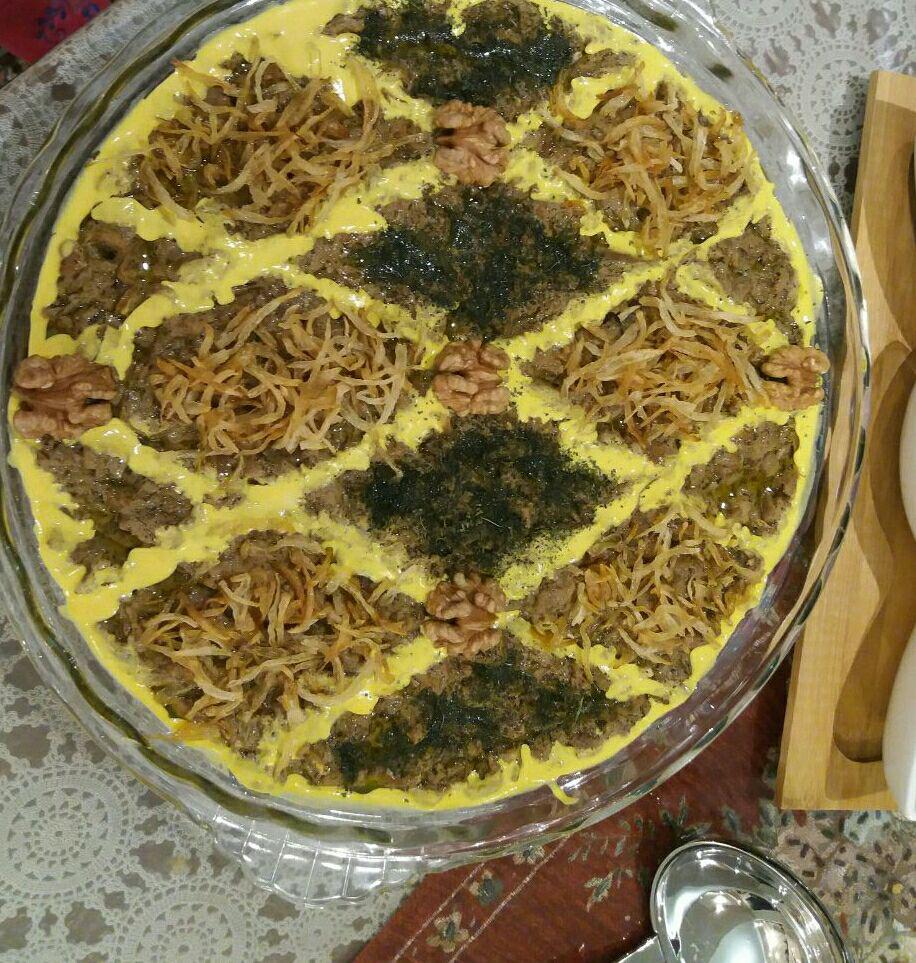
Iranian Azerbaijani-style Kashk bademjan from Tabriz

== See also ==
- List of eggplant dishes
- List of Middle Eastern dishes
- Eggplant salads and appetizers
- Mirza Ghassemi, another popular Iranian eggplant dish
