= Stuffed eggplant =

Eggplant dish

Stuffed eggplants
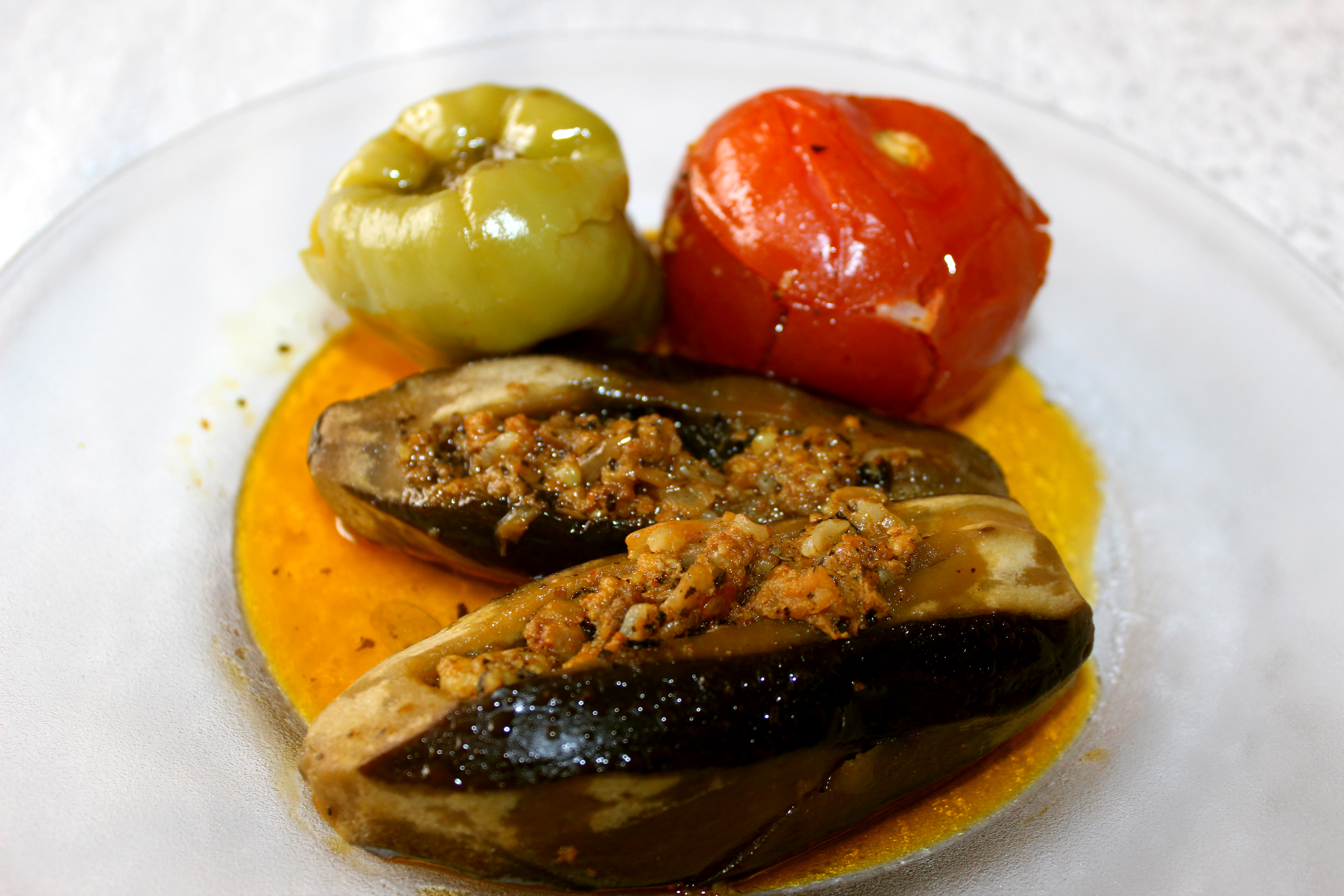
- Course: Meal
- Region or state: Armenia; Azerbaijan; Cyprus; Greece; Egypt; Iran; Israel; Italy; Lebanon; Palestine; Spain; Syria; Turkey
- Serving temperature: Hot
- Main ingredients: Eggplant

Stuffed eggplant (Arabic: محشي باذنجان, Persian: بادمجان شکم پر; Armenian: Լցոնած սմբուկներ; Turkish: patlıcan dolması; Azerbaijani: badımcan dolması; Italian: melanzane ripiene; Spanish: berenjenas rellenas) is a dish typical of many countries.

== Variations ==
=== In Armenia ===
In Armenia and Armenian cuisine, stuffed eggplant is known as either lts’onats smbuk or smbukov dolma (Armenian: լցոնած սմբուկ; սմբուկով դոլմա) and is traditionally made with hollowed eggplant that is filled with rice, meat, herbs (tarragon, mint, parsley, coriander), onions, currants, walnuts or pine nuts and optionally raisins. Another version prepares the filling with onions, garlic, tomatoes, cinnamon, allspice, cumin, turmeric, black pepper, apricots and pomegranate seeds. There also is an Armenian version making this dish using the dried skin and outer layer of an eggplant. Stuffed eggplants are often served with a tarragon vinaigrette.

=== In Egypt ===
In Egypt, stuffed eggplant dolma is known as mahshi bedengan (also pronounced betengan, Egyptian Arabic: محشي باذنجان). Small eggplants are hollowed out and filled with a seasoned mixture of rice and herbs. The stuffing typically includes short-grain rice combined with chopped parsley, dill, coriander, onions, and tomatoes, all seasoned with spices such as cumin, salt, and black pepper.

After stuffing, the eggplants are arranged upright in a pot, covered with a tomato-based sauce, and simmered until tender. This method allows the flavors to meld together, resulting in a savory and aromatic dish. Mahshi bedengan is often served as part of a larger meal, accompanied by other stuffed vegetables like zucchini and bell peppers.

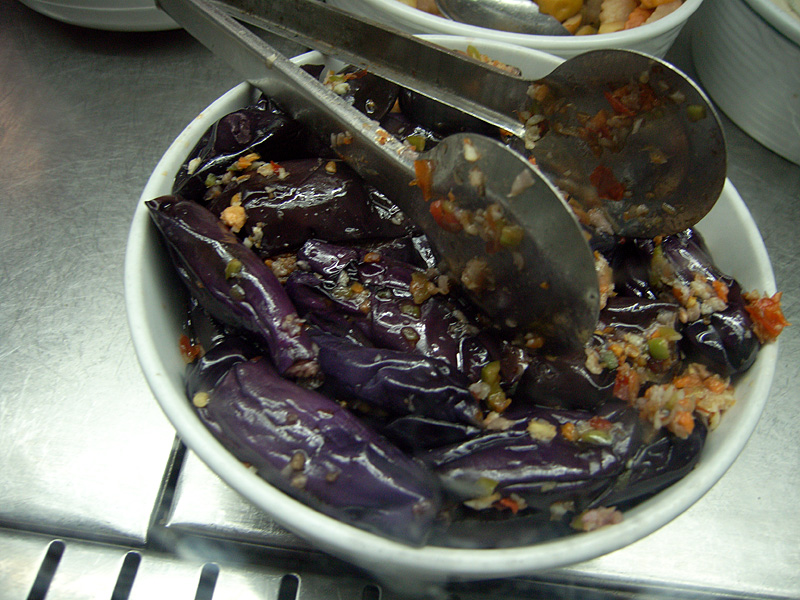
Bedengan mekhalel from Egypt

Bedengan mekhalel (باذنجان مخلل) is a pickled eggplant dish traditionally eaten in Egypt alongside various main dishes. Small eggplants are typically used for this dish; they are boiled until slightly tender before being stuffed with a mixture of minced garlic, chili peppers, coriander, and spices such as cumin and salt. Once stuffed, the eggplants are arranged in a jar and submerged in a brine of vinegar and lemon juice, allowing them to absorb the flavors over time.

=== In Italy ===
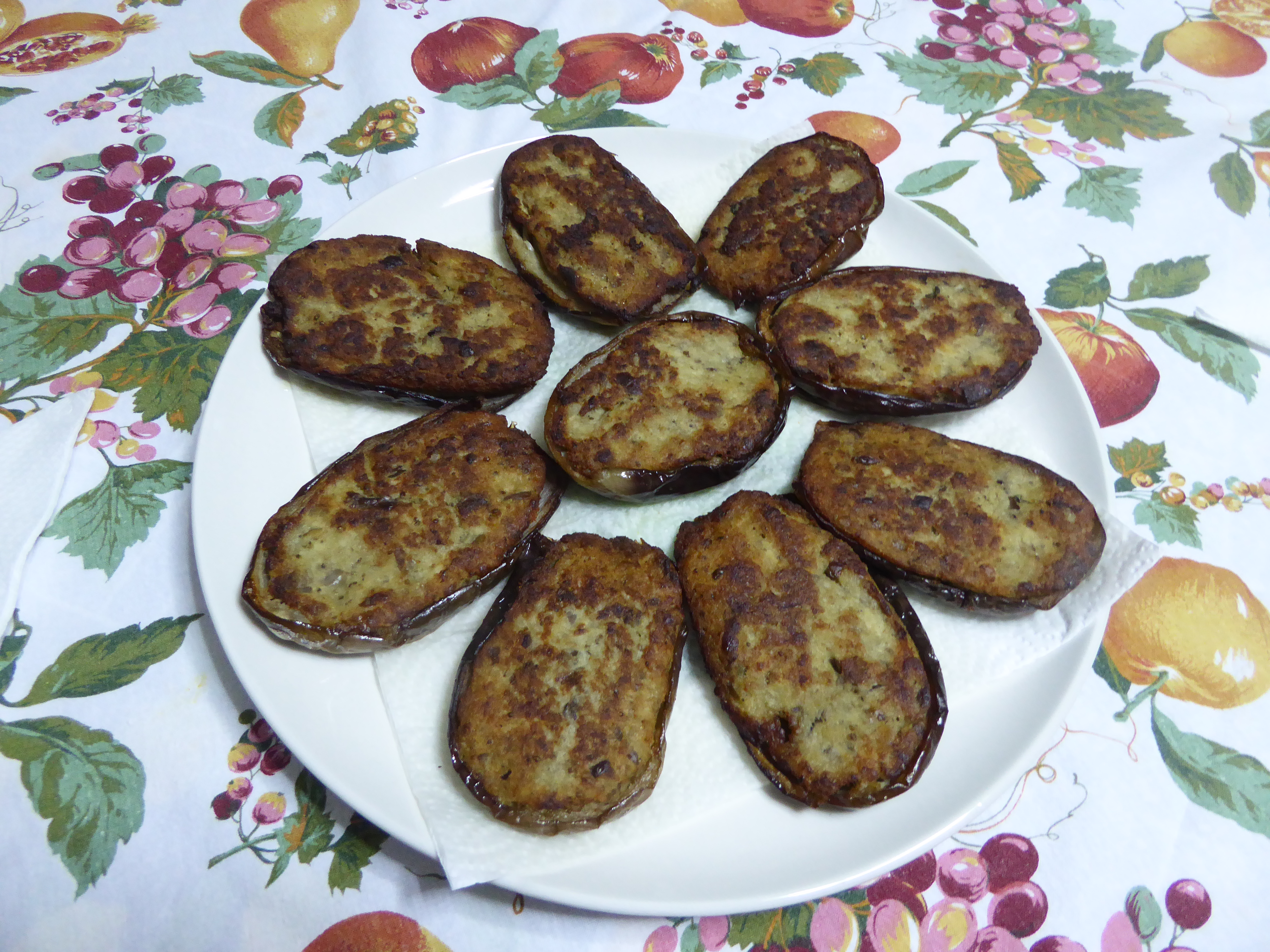
Melanzane ripiene from Calabria

In Italy, stuffed eggplant are cooked in oven, and can be filled with mozzarella cheese (in Rome), or with minced meat (in Sicily).

=== In Turkey ===
Eggplants are stuffed with meat (lamb) and rice or other vegetables. The ingredients include eggplant, minced meat, rice, onion, tomato paste, tomato, parsley, mint, salt, black pepper and sunflower oil. Optional ingredients include sumac, lemon juice, allspice, cinnamon, pine nuts, almonds, walnuts, mint, and olive oil which may be added for a better taste. In Turkey, two famous stuffed eggplant dishes are karnıyarık and İmam bayıldı.

=== In the Levant ===
Makdous is a pickled and stuffed eggplant dish popular in Syria and Lebanon.

== See also ==
- List of eggplant dishes
- List of stuffed dishes
