= Eggplant papoutsaki =

Eggplant dish of the Greek cuisine

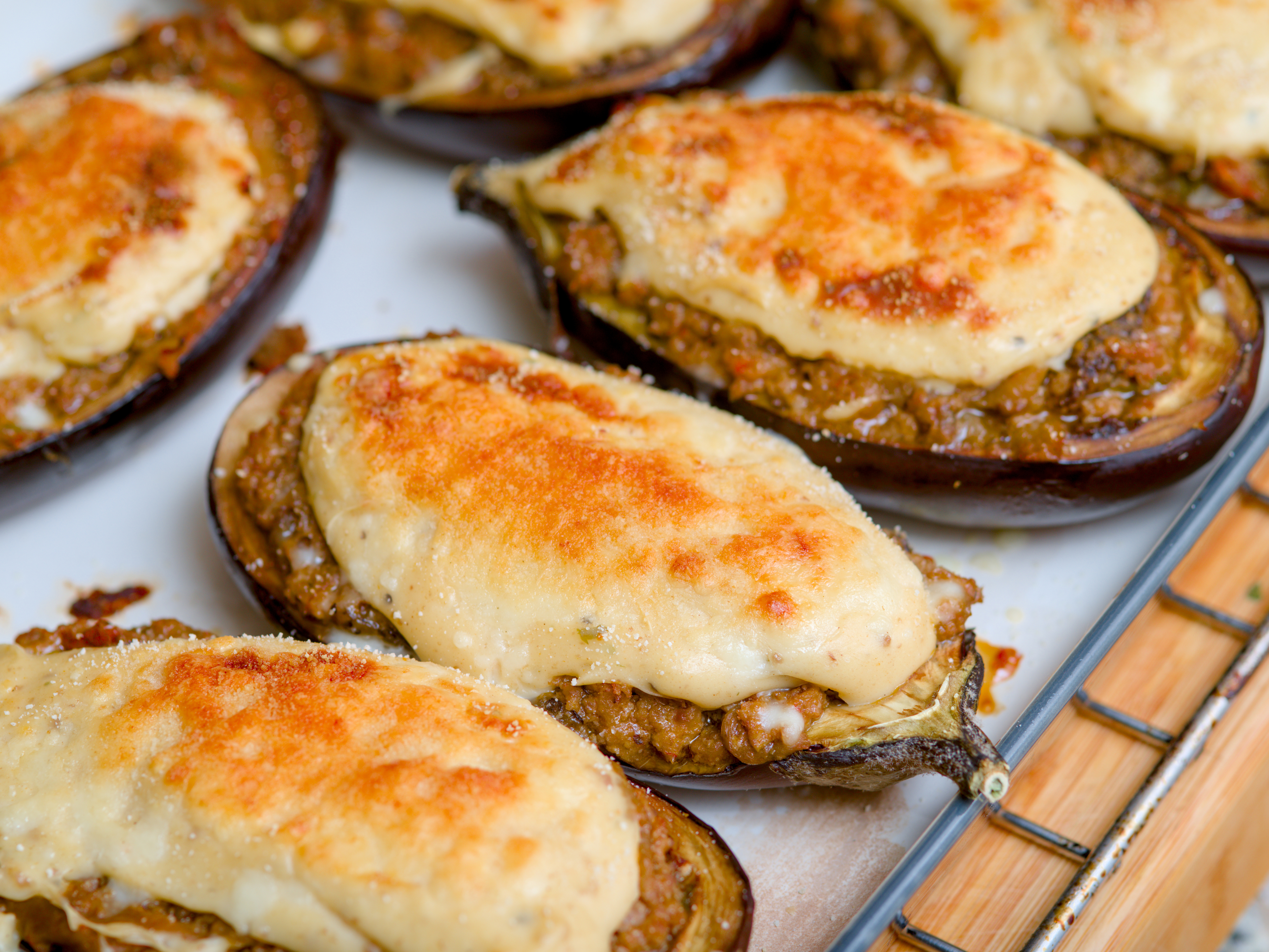
- Region or state: Greece and Turkey
- Serving temperature: Hot

Eggplant papoutsaki (Greek: μελιντζάνα παπουτσάκι, Turkish: patlıcan pabucaki) is an stuffed eggplant dish in Greek and Turkish cuisine.

Papoutsaki 'little shoe' is the Greek diminutive of παπούτσι 'shoe', borrowed from Turkish papuç 'slipper', from Persian pâpuš پاپوش lit. 'foot-cover'.

The dish consists of eggplants which have been boiled or roasted and the tops cut off lengthwise, making them resemble shoes. The flesh is scooped out and mixed with other ingredients, usually ground meat, sometimes eggs, green peppers or bell peppers, green onions, tomatoes, lemon, and olive oil. It is topped with Béchamel sauce and a hard, salty cheese such as kefalotyri, Mihaliç Peyniri, or kasseri and then grilled.

== See also ==
- List of eggplant dishes
- List of stuffed dishes
- Karnıyarık
