= List of eggplant dishes =

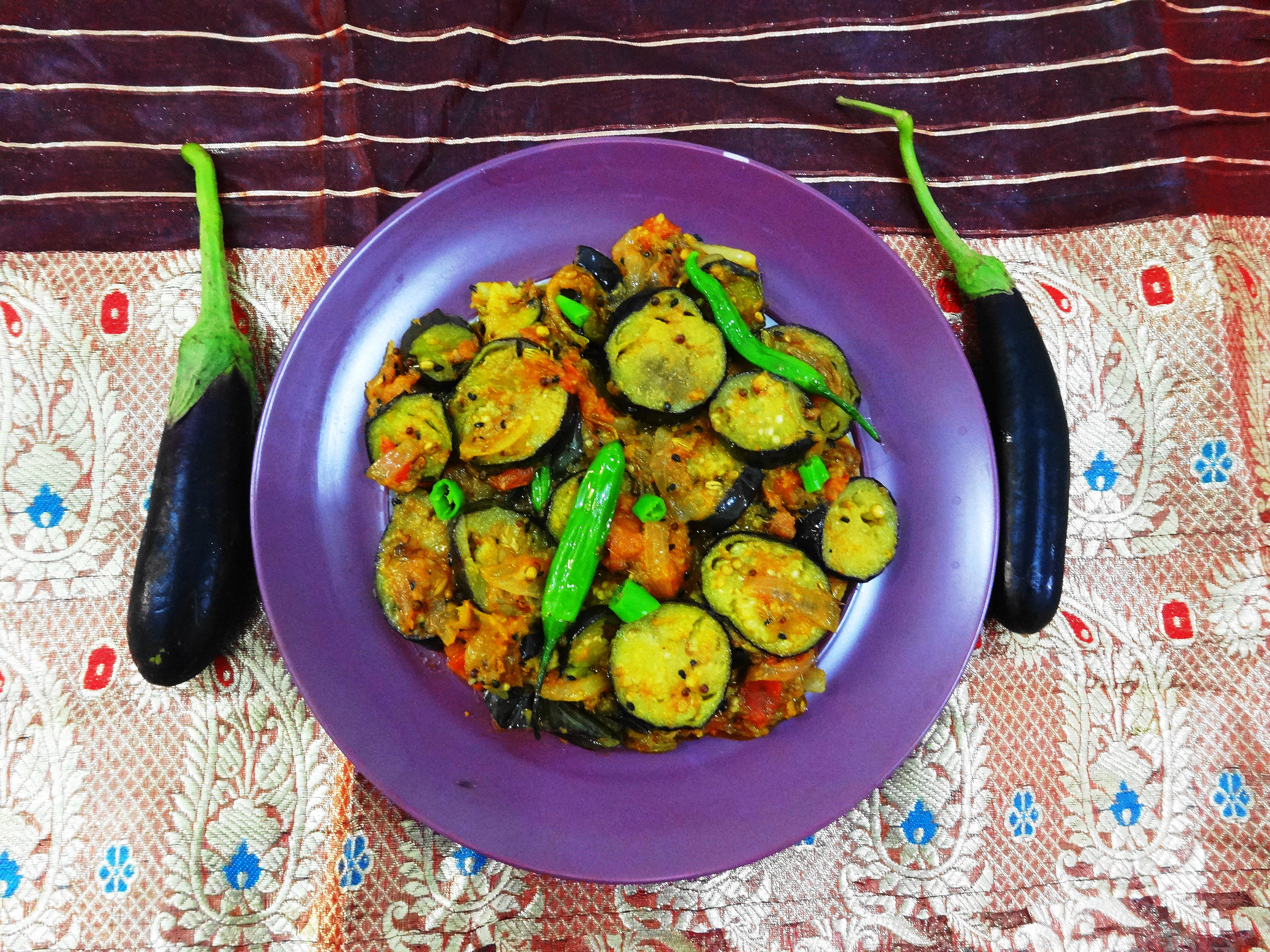
Stir-fried eggplant

This is a list of dishes featuring eggplant as the main or an essential ingredient. Eggplant, also known as aubergine, is used in the cuisine of many countries. It is often stewed, as in the French ratatouille, or deep-fried as in the Italian parmigiana di melanzane, the Turkish karnıyarık or, the Greek musakka (moussaka), and Middle Eastern and South Asian dishes.

Eggplants can also be battered before deep-frying and served with a sauce made of tahini and tamarind. In Iranian cuisine, it is blended with whey as kashk e-bademjan, tomatoes as mirza ghasemi or made into stew as khoresh-e-bademjan. It can be sliced and deep-fried, then served with plain yogurt, (optionally) topped with a tomato and garlic sauce, such as in the Turkish dish patlıcan kızartması (pronounced 'potlejon'; meaning 'fried aubergines') or without yogurt as in patlıcan şakşuka. Perhaps the best-known Turkish eggplant dishes are imam bayıldı (vegetarian) and karnıyarık (with minced meat).

== Eggplant dishes ==
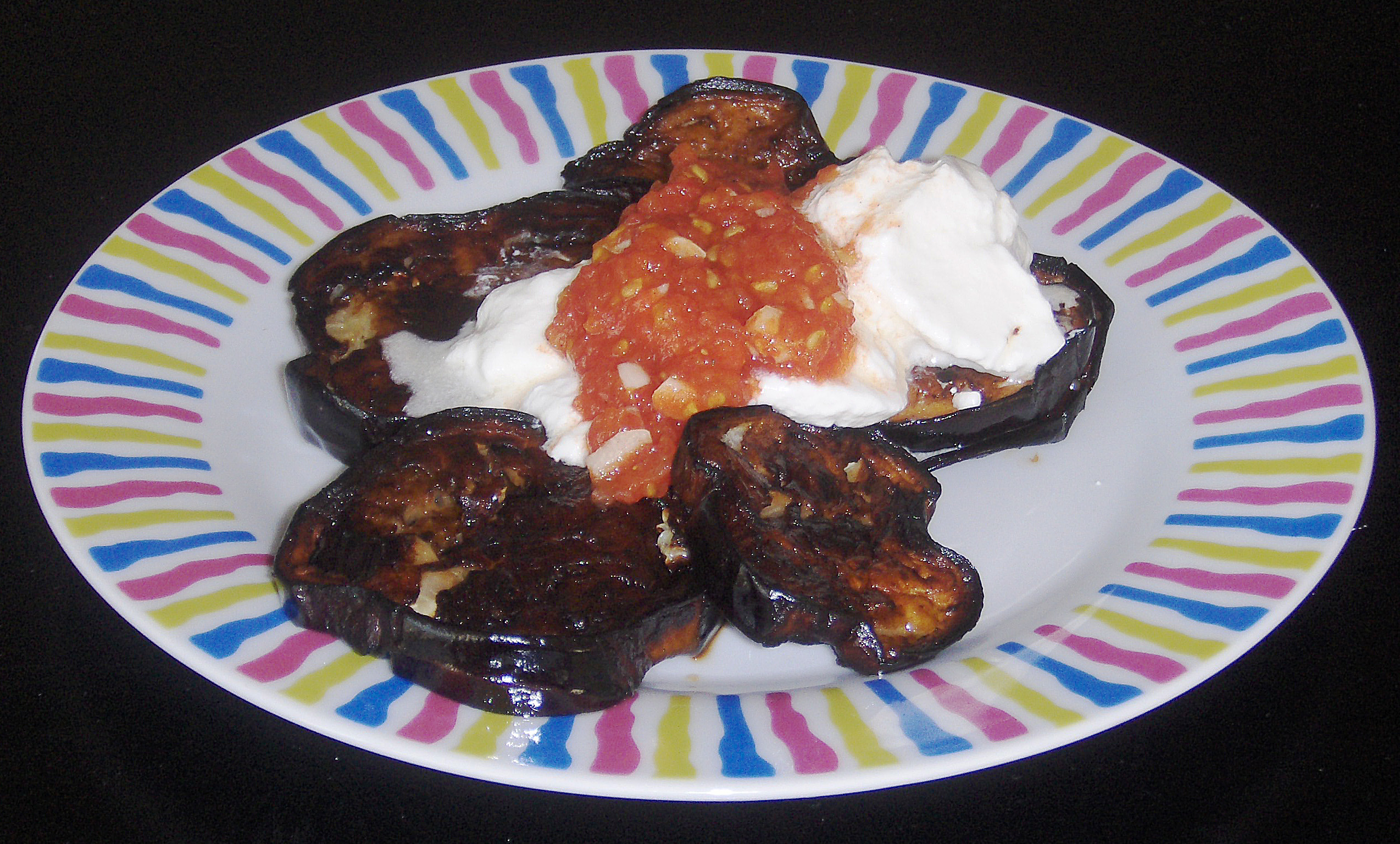
Fried aubergine

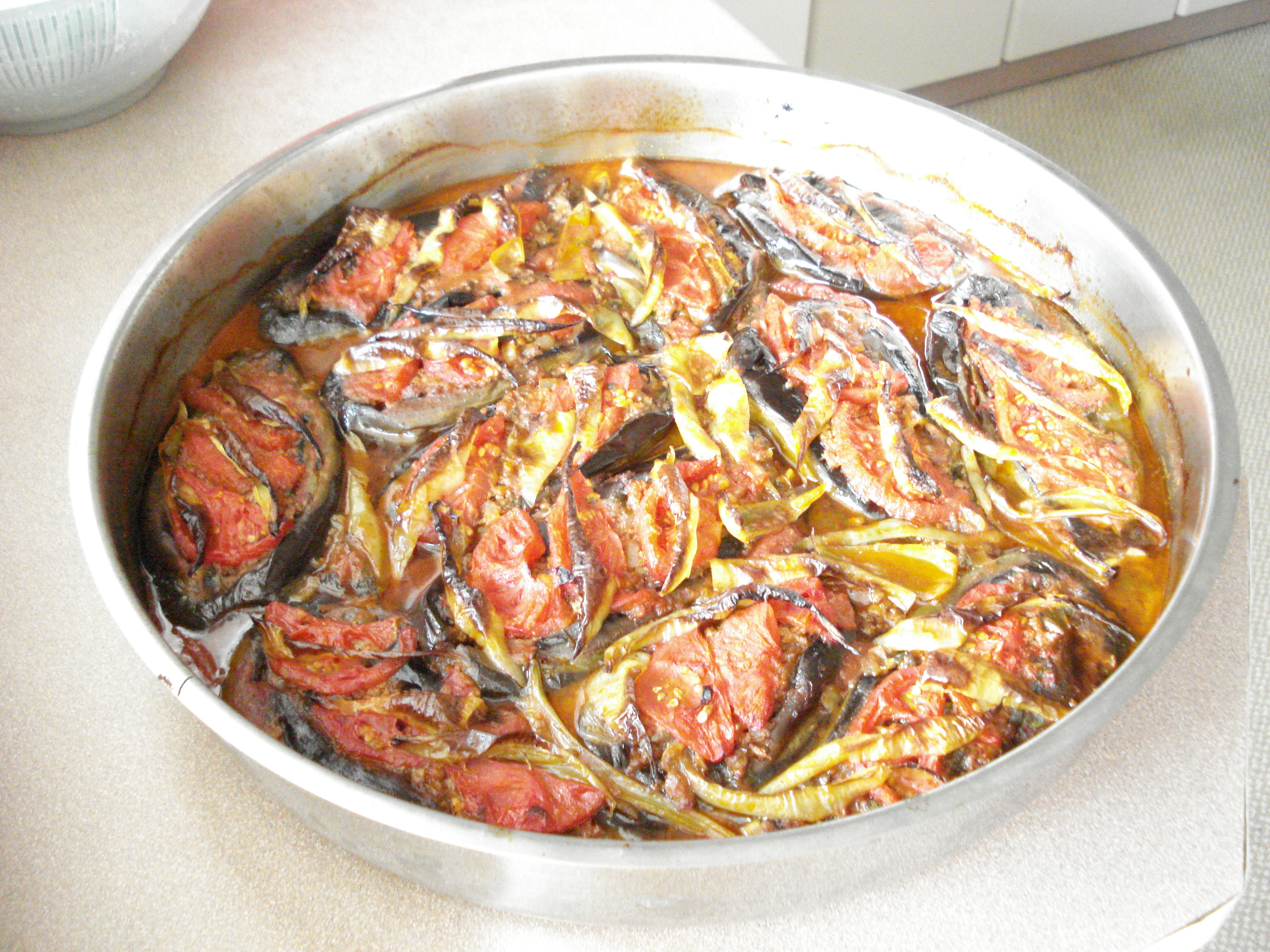
Karnıyarık is a Turkish dish consisting of eggplant stuffed with a mix of sautéed chopped onions, garlic, black pepper, tomatoes, parsley and ground meat.

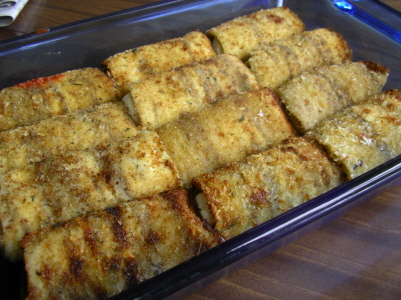
Rollatini is an Italian-style dish usually made with thin slices of eggplant that are dusted in wheat flour or lightly breaded, covered with ricotta and often other cheeses and seasonings, then rolled up and baked.

- Ajapsandali – Traditional eggplant dish
- Alinazik kebab – Turkish dish of Gaziantep province
- Baba ghanoush – Levantine dish of cooked eggplant
- Badrijani – Georgian dish
- Baghara baingan – Hyderabadi cuisine
- Baingan bharta – Indian dish, bearing a resemblance to baba ghanoush
- Beguni – Bengal region brinjal dish
- Berenjenas de Almagro – Iberian culinary style, a pickled aubergine characteristic of "Manchega" cuisine from the Castile-La Mancha region of Spain, specifically from Almagro, a city in the Ciudad Real province of Spain.
- Bruschetta – Italian appetizer
- Cacciatore – Italian dish
- Caponata – Sicilian eggplant dish
- Confit byaldi – Variation of ratatouille
- Dahi baigana – Yogurt and eggplant dish
- Di san xian – Chinese dish
- Eggplant salads and appetizers – includes many dishes from various cultures
- Escalivada – Catalan traditional smoky grilled vegetable dish
- Fried aubergine – Eggplant dish
- Hünkârbeğendi – Turkish dish of pureed eggplant and meat
- İmam bayıldı – Turkish aubergine dish
- Karnıyarık – Turkish stuffed eggplant and meat dish
- Kashk bademjan – Iranian dish
- Kyopolou – Bulgarian-Turkish dish
- Malidzano – Traditional Macedonian spread made from puréed bell peppers, eggplant, oil and salt
- Mesa’ah - Egyptian fried eggplant made with tomato sauce, garlic, and onions; eaten cold
- Mirza ghassemi – Iranian seasoned eggplant dish
- Makdous – Syrian dish of oil-cured aubergines. They are miniature, tangy eggplants stuffed with walnuts, red pepper, garlic, olive oil, and salt.
- Moussaka – Dish of layered vegetables, sauce and meat
- Melanzane al cioccolato –Italian dish typical of Maiori and the Amalfitan coast, Campania. Chocolate aubergines are generally prepared during the holidays, especially for Ferragosto, and being a very ancient dish, they were originally prepared by monks, the dish has undergone several variations over the years.
- Parmigiana – Italian dish of eggplant with cheese and tomato sauce
- Pasta alla Norma

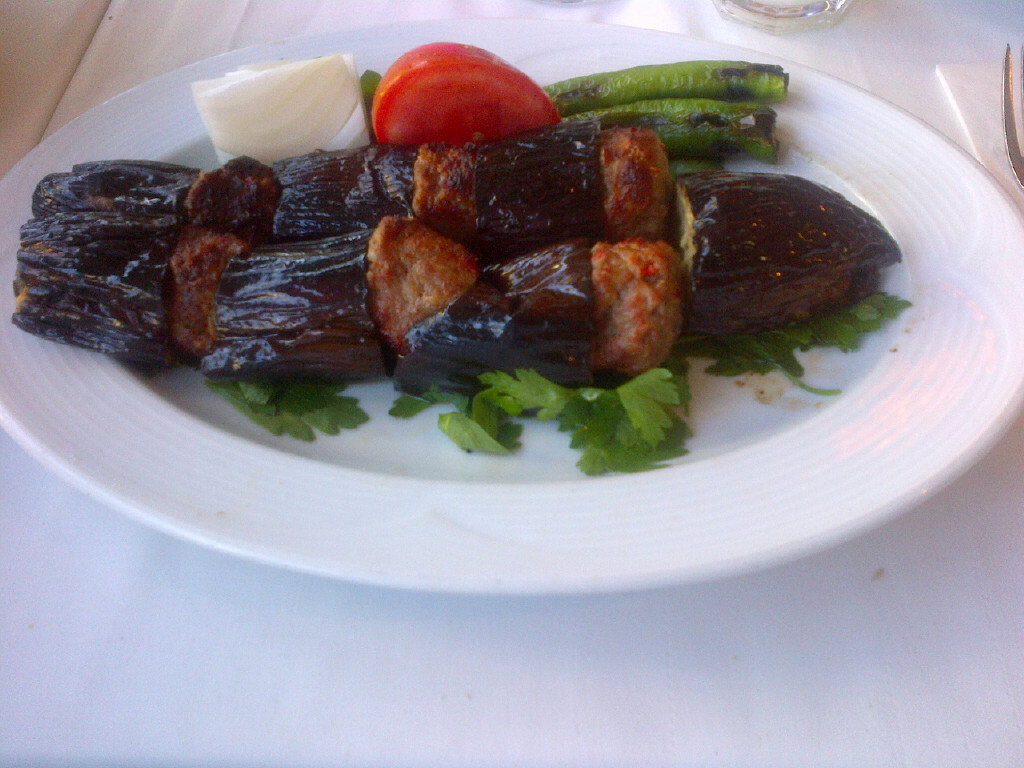
Patlıcanlı kebap

- Patlıcanlı kebap – Kebab dish
- Pinđur – Relish spread in the Balkan peninsula
- Pisto – Spanish dish
- Poqui poqui – Filipino-Ilocano dish of eggs and chopped eggplants
- Ratatouille – French stewed vegetable dish
- Rellenong talong – Filipino eggplant fritter
- Rollatini – Italian-style dish
- Sabich – Israeli Street Food sandwich
- Stuffed eggplant – Eggplant dish

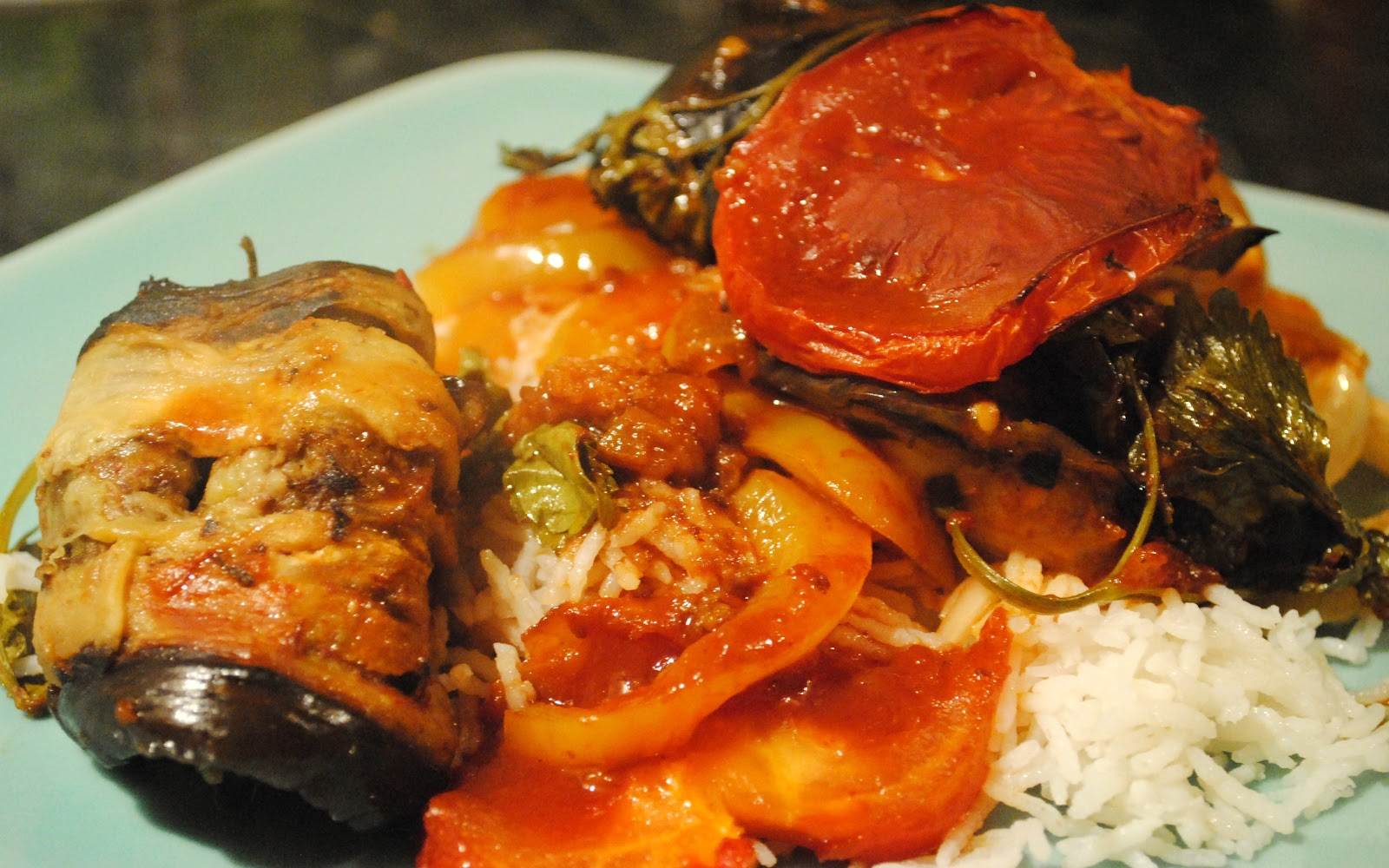
Tepsi baytinijan

- Tepsi baytinijan – an Iraqi casserole dish consisting of eggplants, which are sliced and fried before placing in a baking dish, accompanied with meatballs, tomatoes, onions and garlic.
- Terong balado – Indonesian spice mixture
- Three Fried Stuffed Treasures – Hong Kong Street Food
- Tortang talong – Filipino eggplant fritter
- Tombet – Vegetable dish from Majorca
- Türlü – Turkish vegetable stew
- Zaalouk – Moroccan dish
- Zacuscă – Romanian, Moldovan and Hungarian condiment
Eggplant dishes

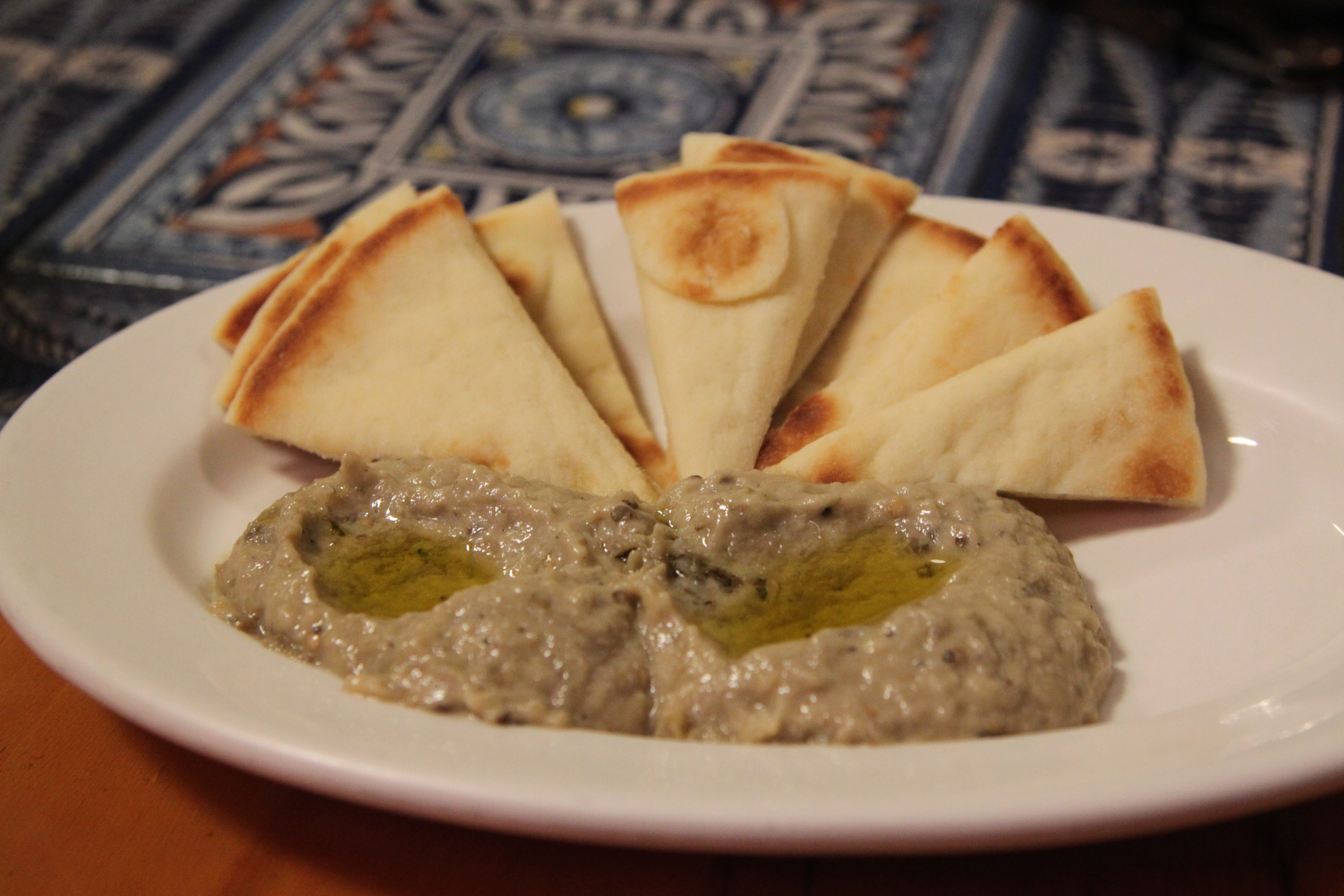
Baba ghanoush is a Levantine dish of cooked eggplant mixed with onions, tomatoes, olive oil and various seasonings, served here with pita bread.

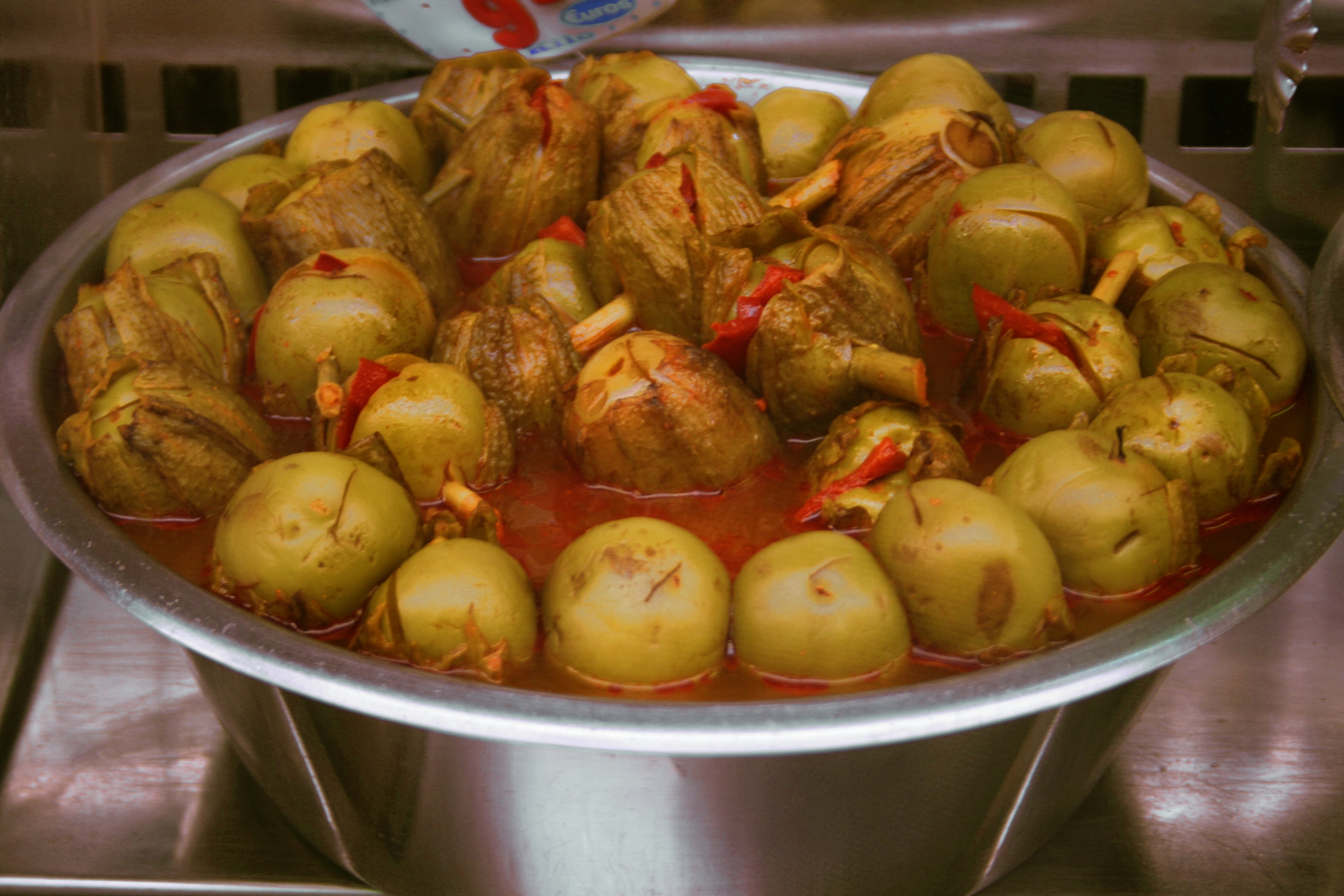
Berenjenas de Almagro: Seasoned and pickled Almagro eggplant from Spain

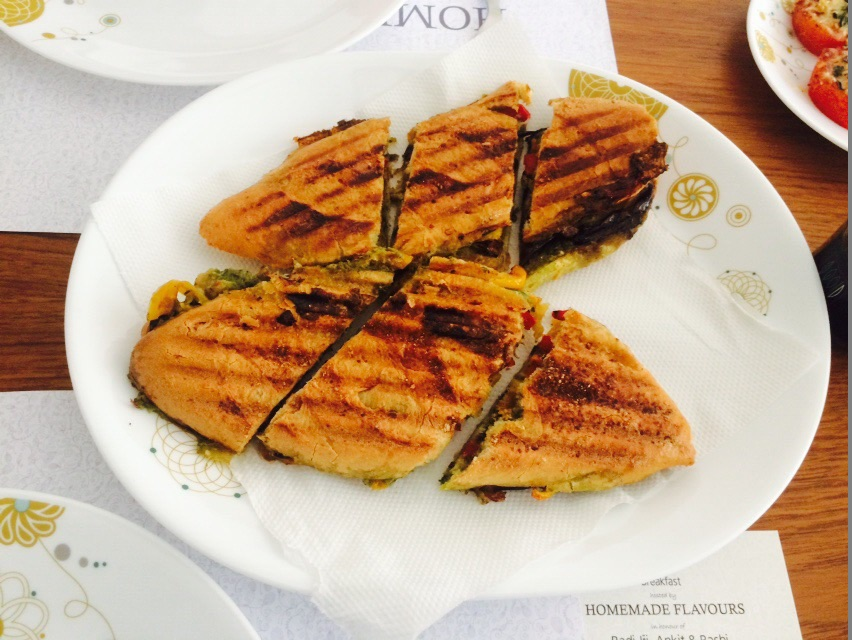
Grilled aubergine from Japanese cuisine

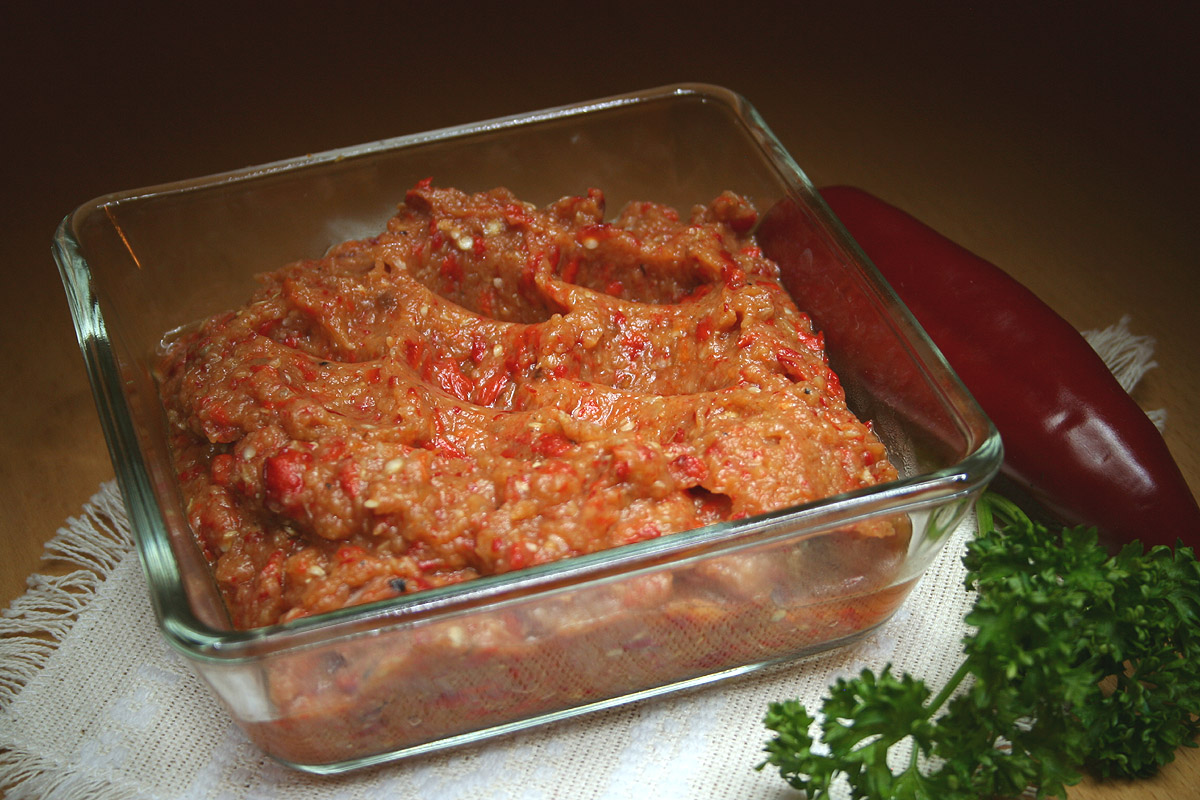
Kyopolou is a popular Bulgarian and Turkish relish made principally from roasted eggplants and garlic.

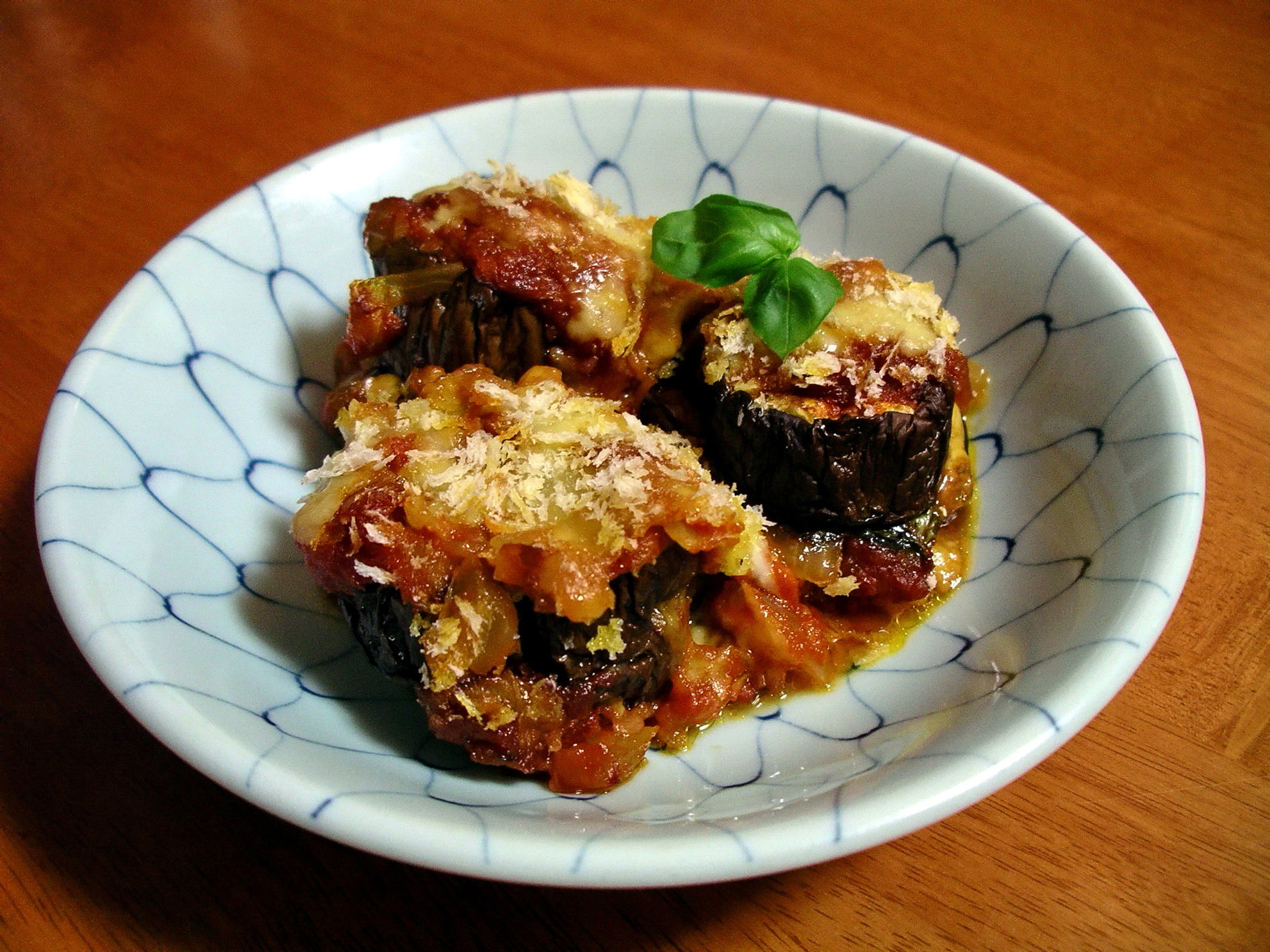
Melanzane alla parmigiana is an Italian oven-baked dish consisting of aubergine, Parmesan cheese, mozzarella and tomato sauce.

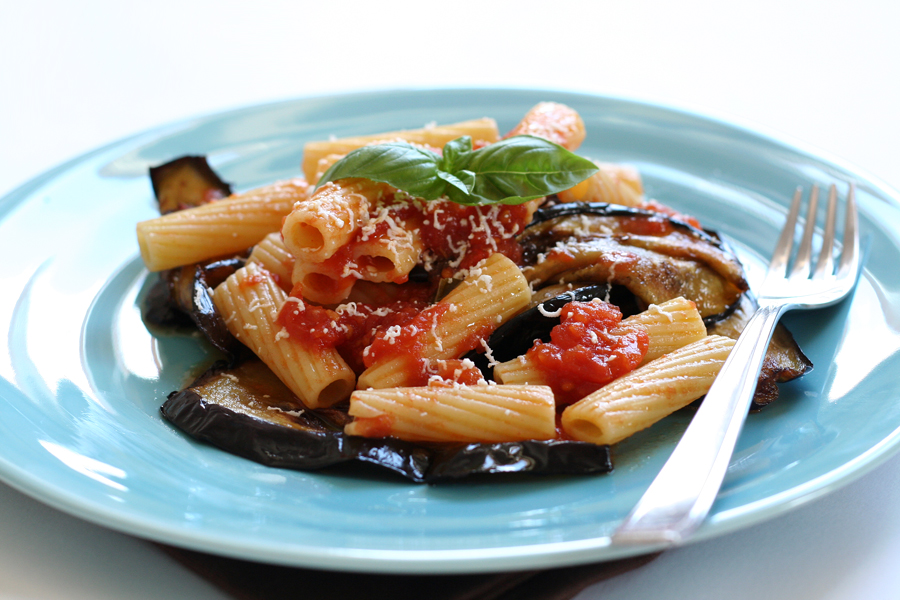
Pasta alla Norma is a classic pasta dish in Sicilian cuisine from Catania

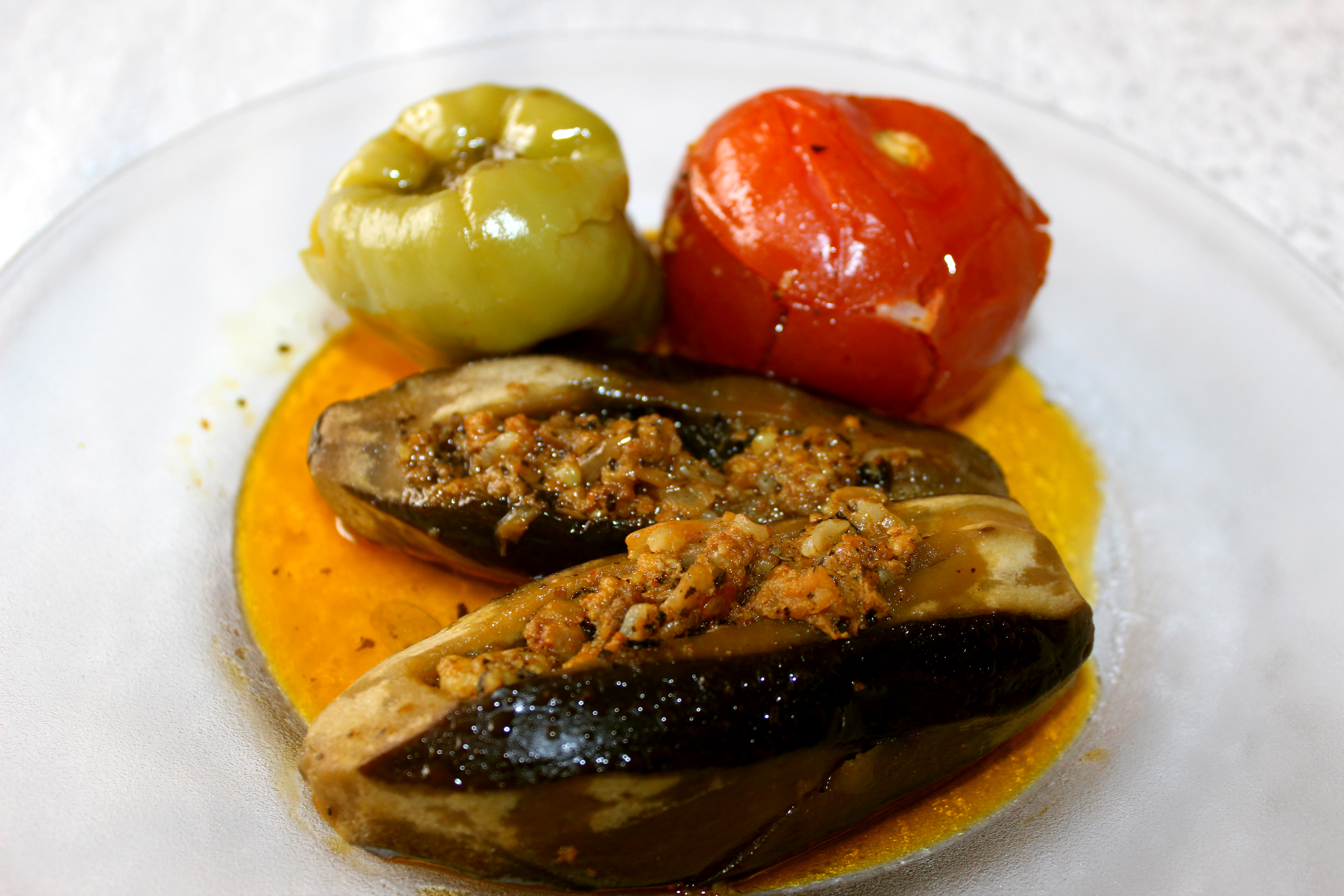
Badımcan dolması (stuffed eggplant) from Azerbaijan, together with tomato and bell pepper dolmas

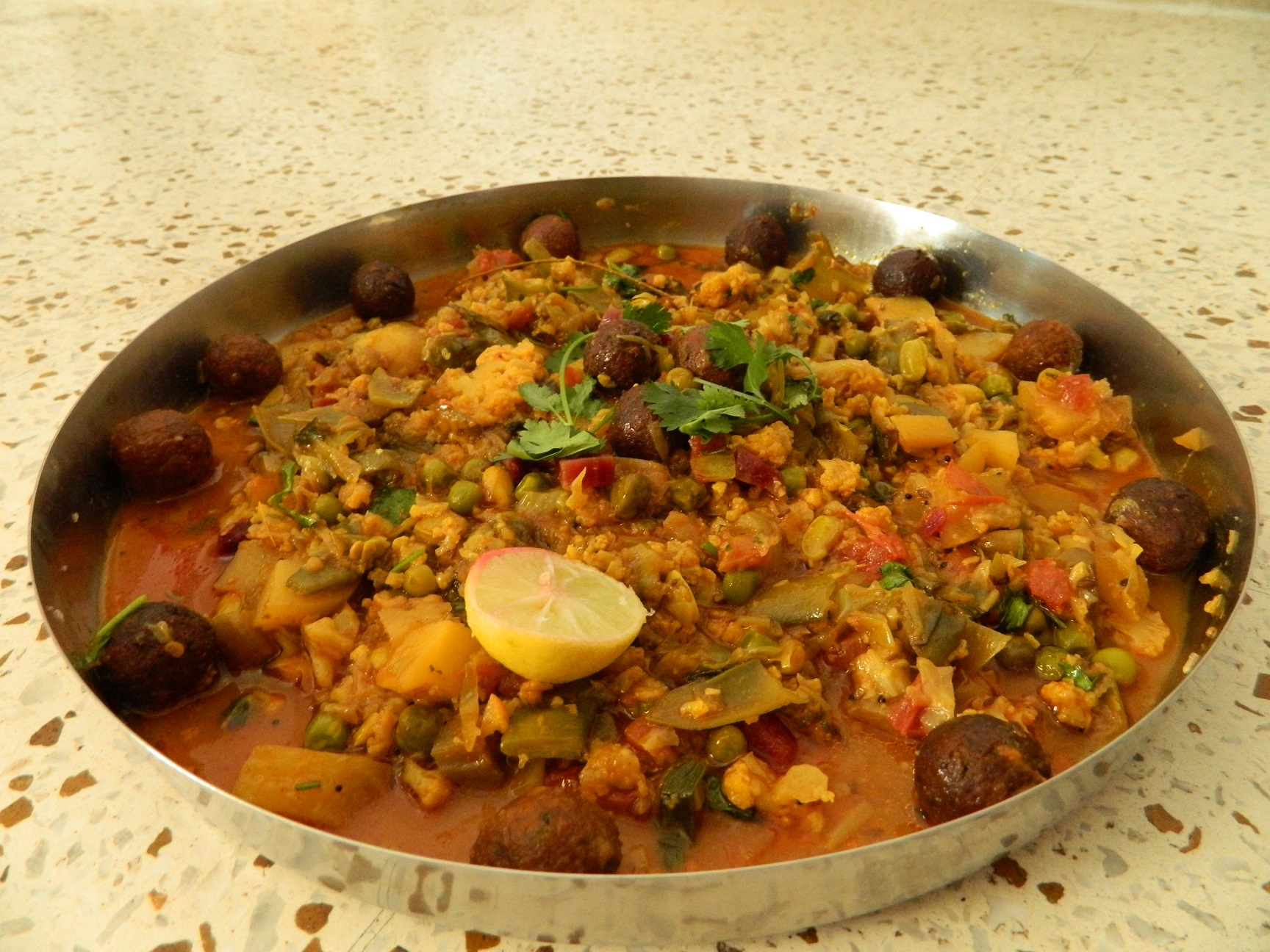
Undhiyu is a mixture of a variety of different vegetables from Indian cuisine

== See also ==
- List of vegetable dishes
- List of foods
