= Rollatini =

Italian-style dish

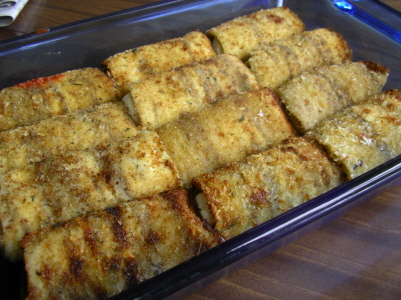
- Alternative names: Involtini
- Place of origin: Italy
- Main ingredients: Eggplant or veal or chicken or fish, ricotta
- Food energy (per serving): 20 kcal (84 kJ)

Rollatini (sometimes spelled rolatini or rolletini) or involtini is an Italian-style dish (called rollatini di melanzane in faux Italian) that is usually made with thin slices of eggplants, which are dusted in wheat flour or lightly breaded and covered with ricotta and often other cheeses and seasonings, then rolled up and baked. Alternatively, veal, chicken, or fish may be used in place of the eggplant.

Rollatini is not an actual Italian word or dish; it is an Italian-American food based on the Italian dish involtini (e.g., involtini di melanzane).

== See also ==
- List of eggplant dishes
