= Eggplant kebab =

Kebab dish

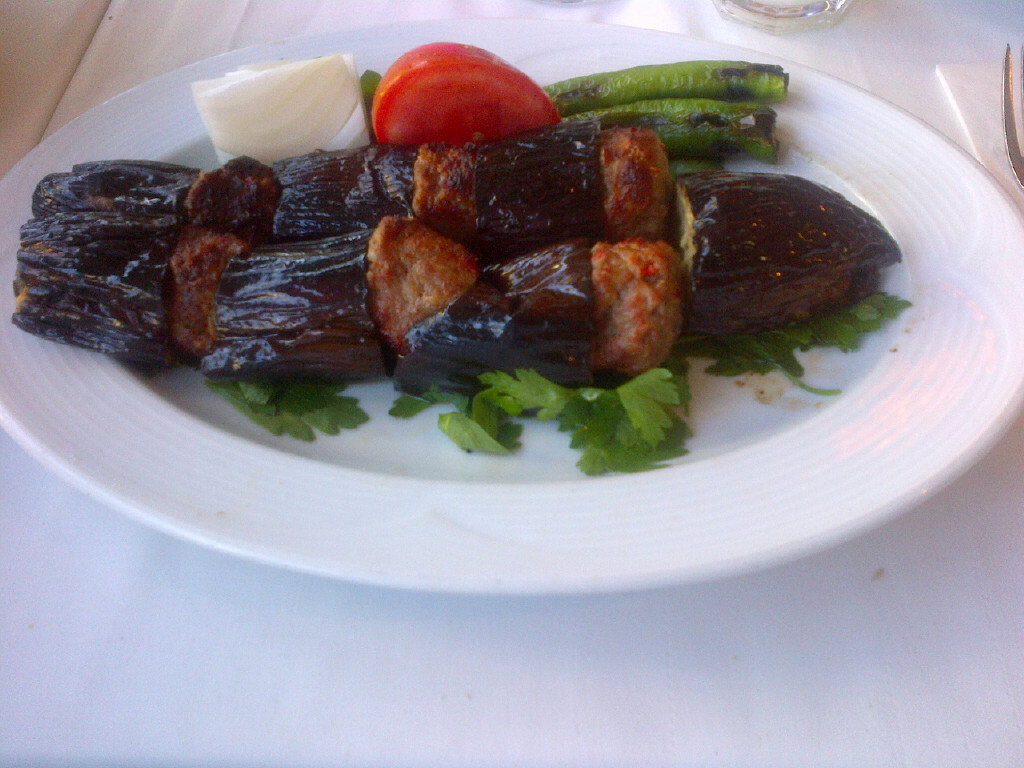
Eggplant kebab

Eggplant kebab (Turkish: Patlıcan kebap /pɑːˈdɯˈɪŋʒɑːn keˈbaːp/, Gaziantep dialect of Turkish: balcan kebabı, Arabic: كباب باذنجان) is a Turkish kebab (meat dish) that may be prepared according to various traditions.

One style of eggplant kebab consists of pieces of eggplant layered alternately with fine-chopped (not minced) meat such as beef and lamb. It may be assembled on a skewer and cooked over a fire. Fırında patlıcan kebabı (oven-baked eggplant kebab) can be made with skewers in a dish, or the ingredients arranged in a circular pan, with spices such as pepper, and eaten with raw onions and a soft Turkish flatbread, called yufka, or with lavaş. In the area of Şanlıurfa Birecik and other parts of Southern Turkey, people traditionally would prepare a tray of eggplant kebab from leftover eggplant and chicken meat at home, then take it to a local bakery to be cooked in the wood-fired oven.

== See also ==
- List of eggplant dishes
- List of kebabs
