= Fried eggplant =

Eggplant dish

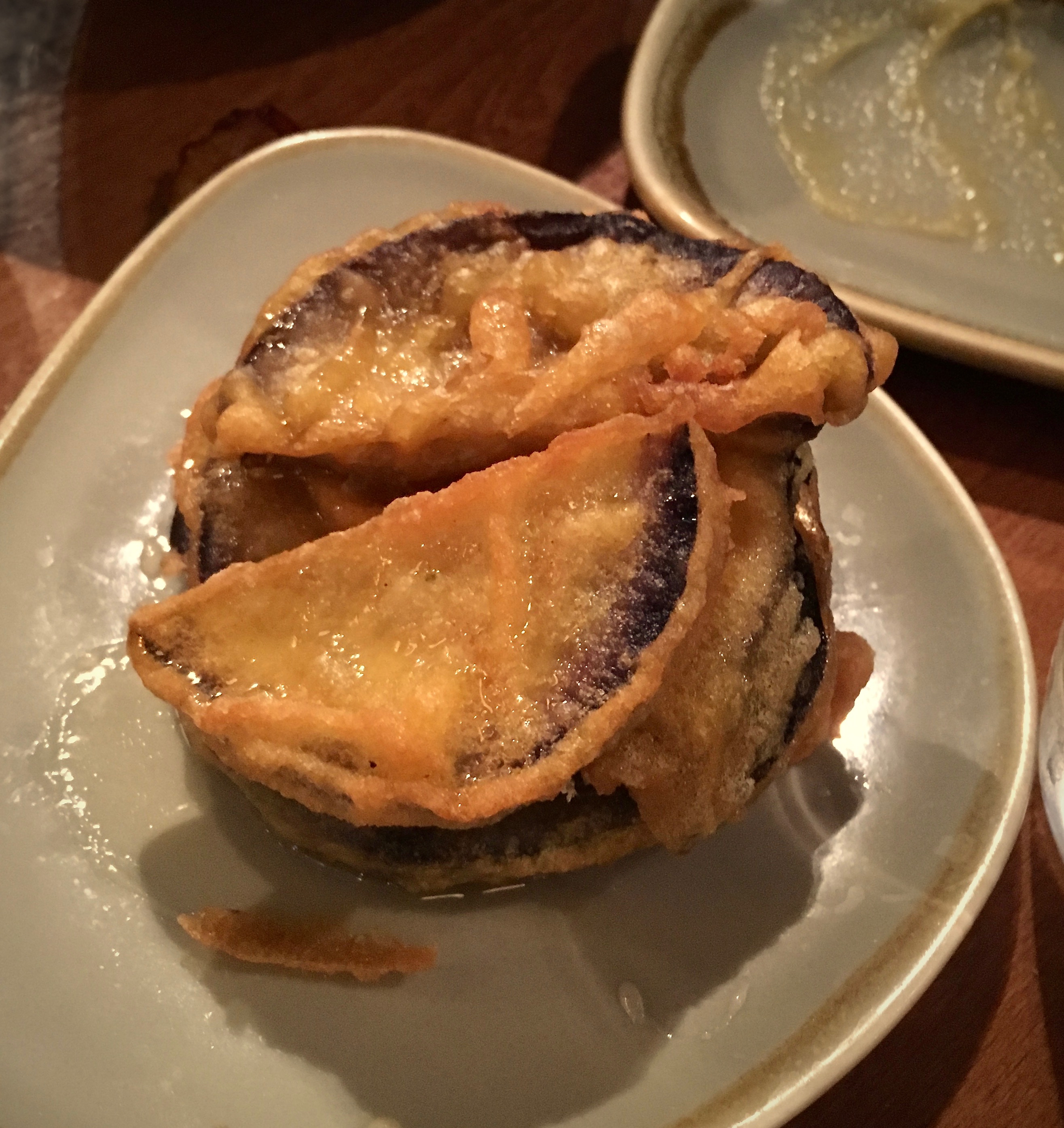
Berenjenas con miel, aubergine crisps with honey

Fried eggplant, or fried aubergine, is used in dishes of many different cuisines.

== Regional varieties ==
=== Spain ===
In Spanish cuisine, this dish takes the form of a tapa. In the province of Córdoba it is usually made with honey.

=== Turkey ===
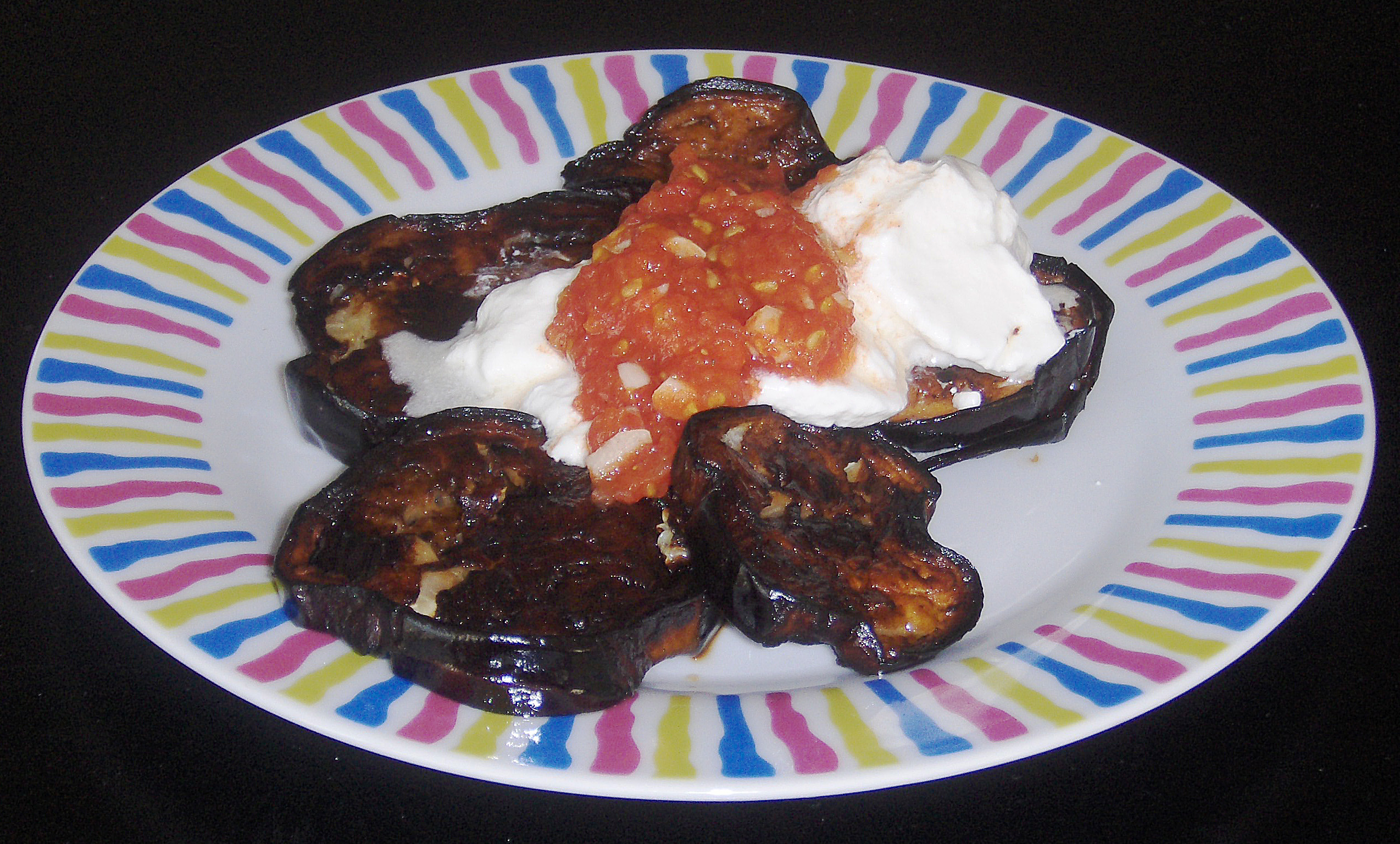
Fried eggplant with yoghurt as found in Turkish cuisine

Fried eggplant (Turkish: Patlıcan kızartma or Patlıcan kızartması) is found in Turkish cuisine. It is such a common dish during summer months that this season used to be called patlıcan kızartma ayları (fried eggplant months) in Ottoman Istanbul, where this generalized frying caused huge fires and destroyed entire mahalles due to the abundance of old wooden houses. The dish is usually eaten with a garlic yogurt or tomato sauce.

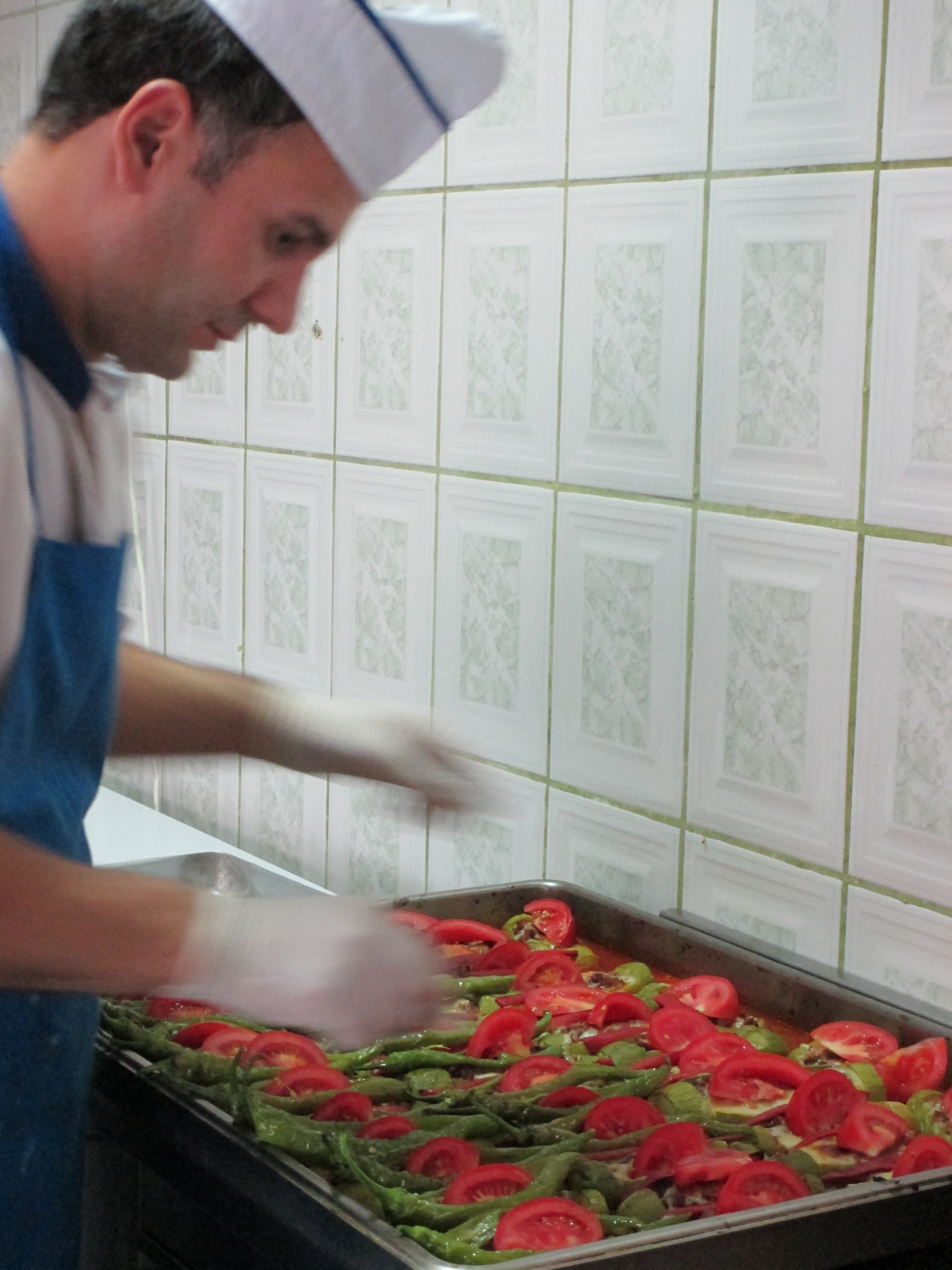
Patlıcan kızartma being prepared for service within a karışık (mixed) kızartma tray

=== Italy ===
In Southern Italy, especially in Campania region, eggplants are cut into little pieces and then fried. Melanzane a funghetto have two variants, the one with tomatoes and the other without. Another recipe which contains fried eggplants is parmigiana di melanzane, famous in all southern regions of the country.

=== Middle East ===
In Arab and Israeli cuisines, fried eggplant is typically served with tahini. In Israel, it is used to make sabich, a popular sandwich of fried eggplant and hard-boiled egg in a pita.

=== South Asia ===
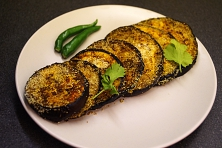
Fried eggplant with Indian spices

In India, fried eggplant is also known as brinjal phodi or vangyache kaap in the Konkani language. Made with shallow-fried eggplant slices, this recipe is typically a Konkani and Maharashtrian dish, very similar to begun bhaja from Bengali cuisine.

== See also ==
- List of eggplant dishes
