= Disanxian =

Chinese dish

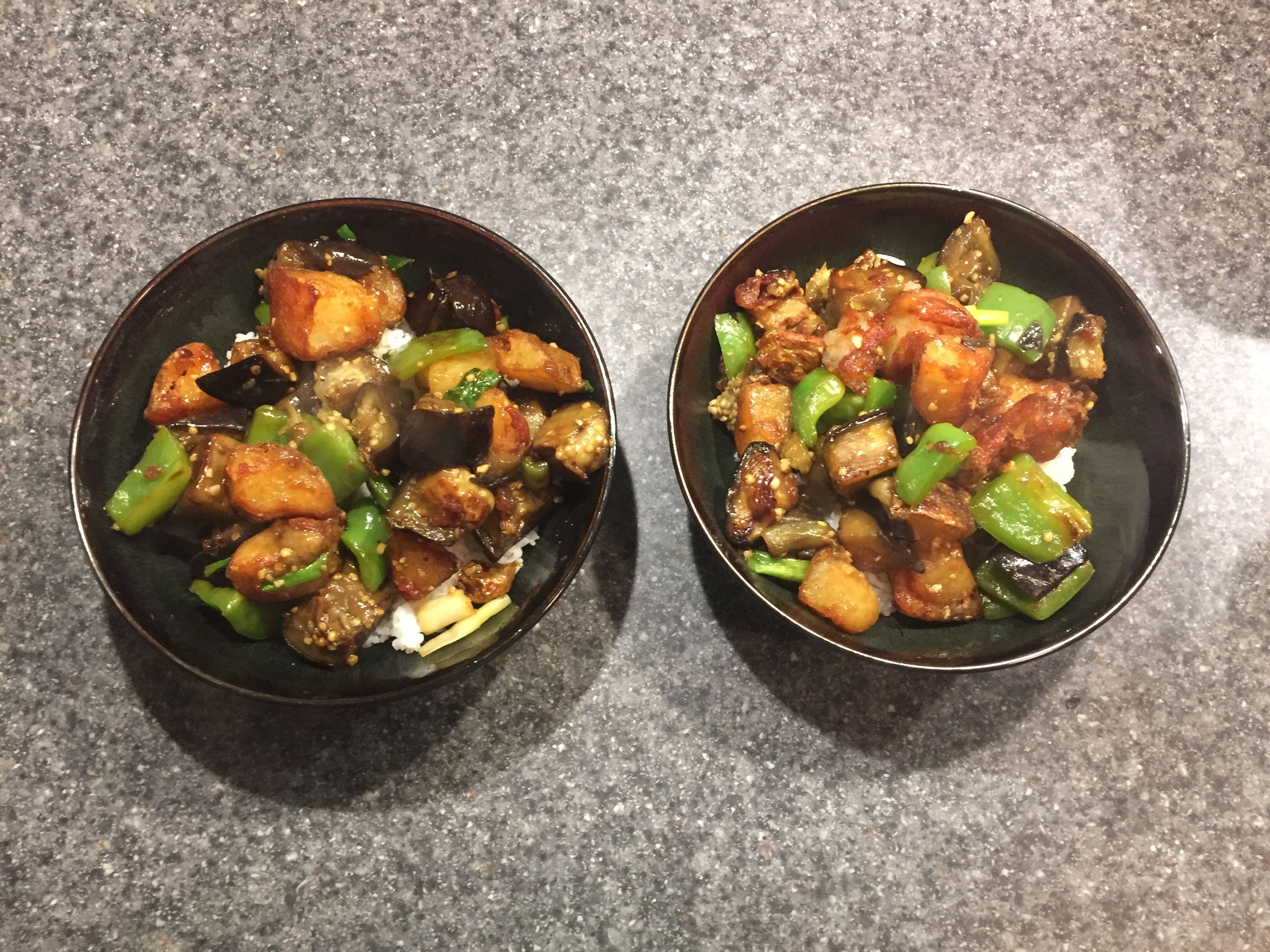
- Cooked disanxian

Disanxian (Chinese: 地三鲜; pinyin: Dìsānxiān) is a Chinese dish made of three kinds of nightshade vegetables: stir-fried potatoes, eggplant, and sweet peppers. Additional ingredients may include garlic, spring onion, and others. The name roughly translates to "three treasures from the earth" because it consists of the three key ingredients listed above. It is considered a classic dish in Northeastern Chinese cuisine, and is common in northern China.

== See also ==
- List of eggplant dishes
- List of potato dishes
- List of vegetable dishes
