= Karnıyarık =

Turkish stuffed eggplant and meat dish

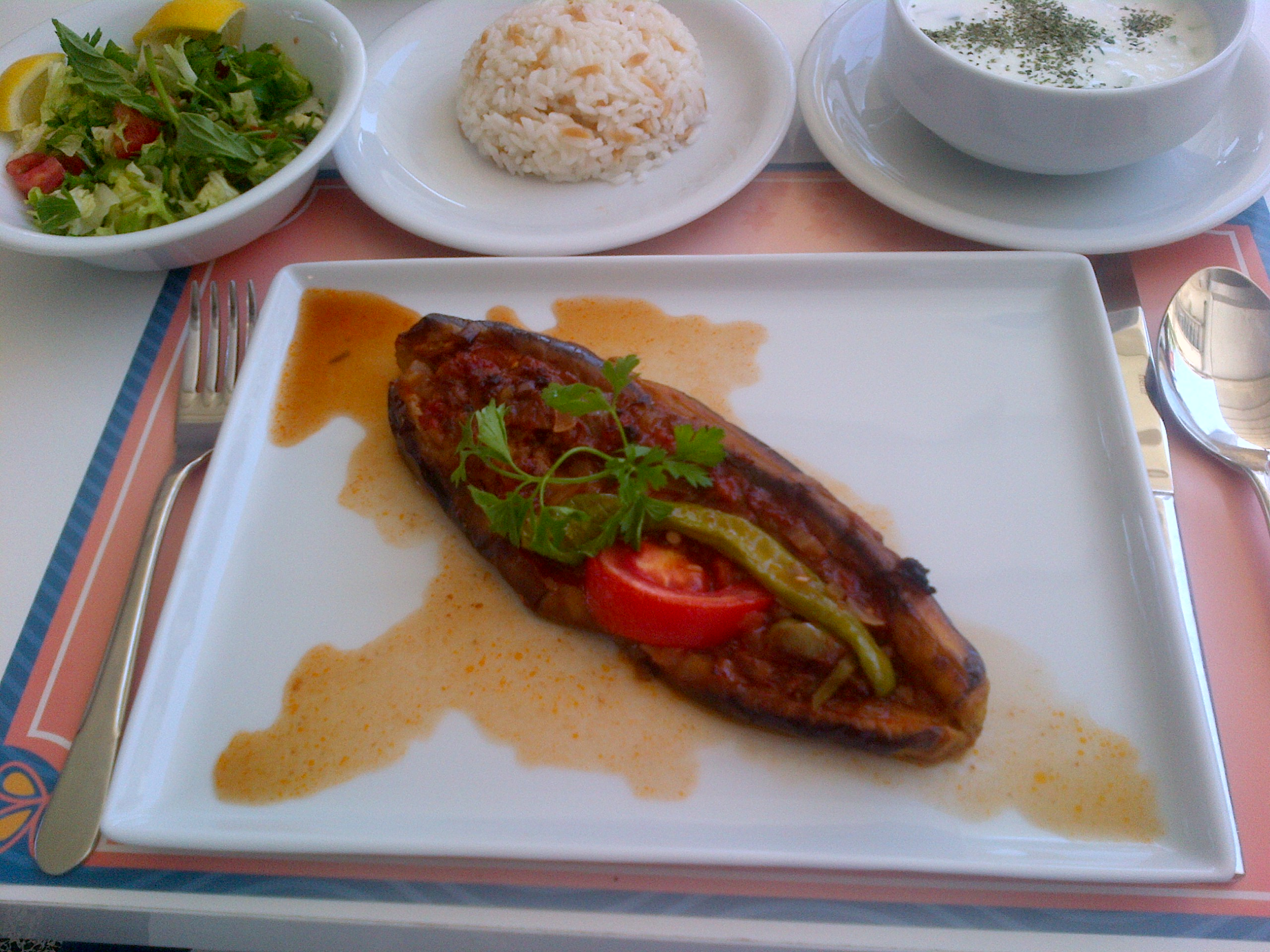
- Place of origin: Turkey
- Main ingredients: Eggplant, onions, garlic, black pepper, tomatoes, parsley and ground meat
- Variations: İmam bayıldı

Karnıyarık (lit. 'riven belly') is a Turkish dish of eggplant stuffed with a mix of sautéed chopped onions, garlic, black pepper, tomatoes, optional green pepper, parsley, and ground meat.

It is similar to İmam bayıldı, which does not include meat and is served at room temperature or warm. The eggplant is traditionally fried, though it can also be roasted.

The dish is often served with rice.

== See also ==
- Moussaka
- Papoutsakia
- List of casserole dishes
- List of eggplant dishes
