= Makdous =

Levantine pickled eggplant dish

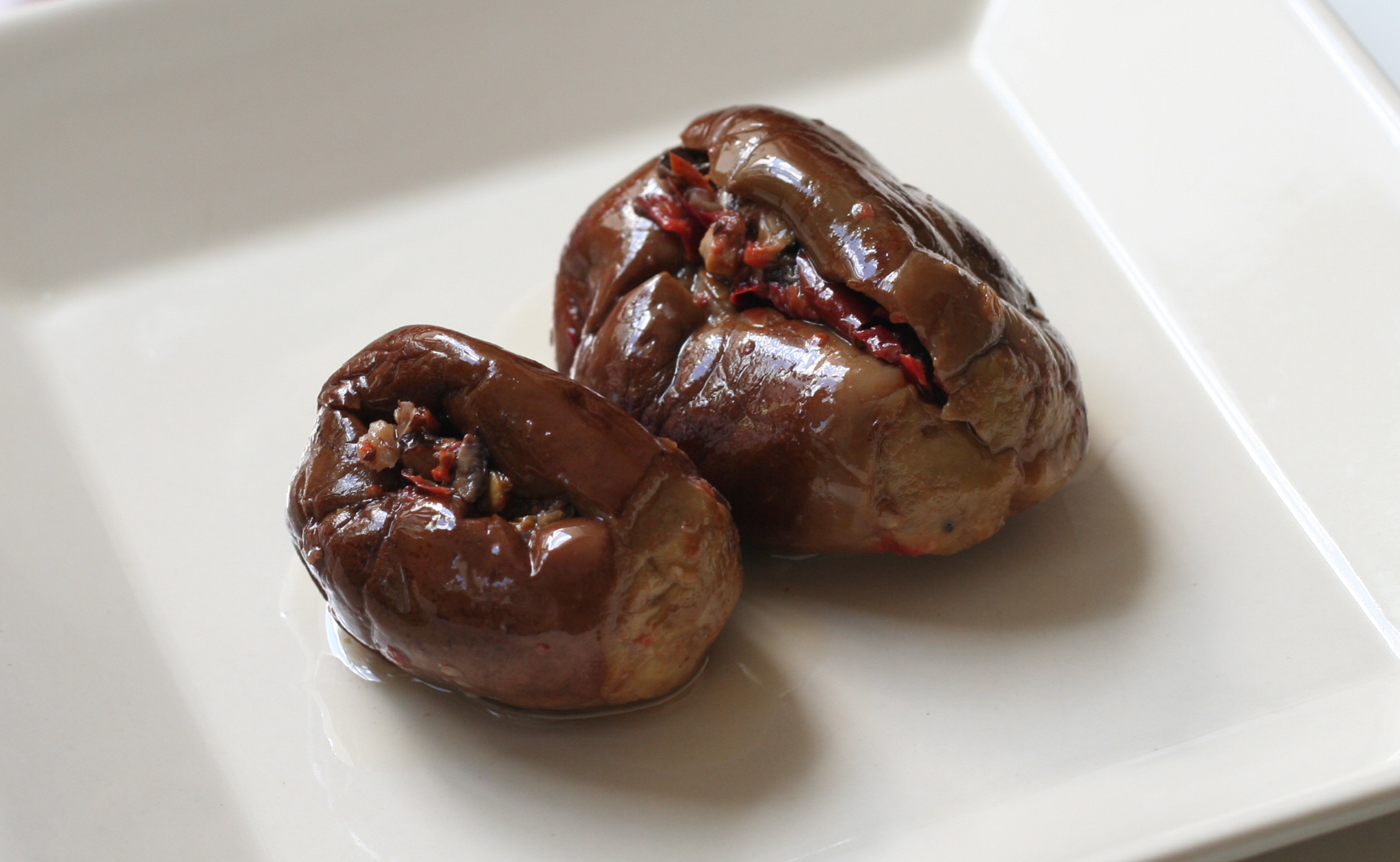
- Course: Hors d'oeuvre
- Place of origin: Syria (region)
- Region or state: Syria, Jordan, Lebanon, and Palestine
- Main ingredients: Eggplants, walnuts, red pepper, garlic, olive oil, salt

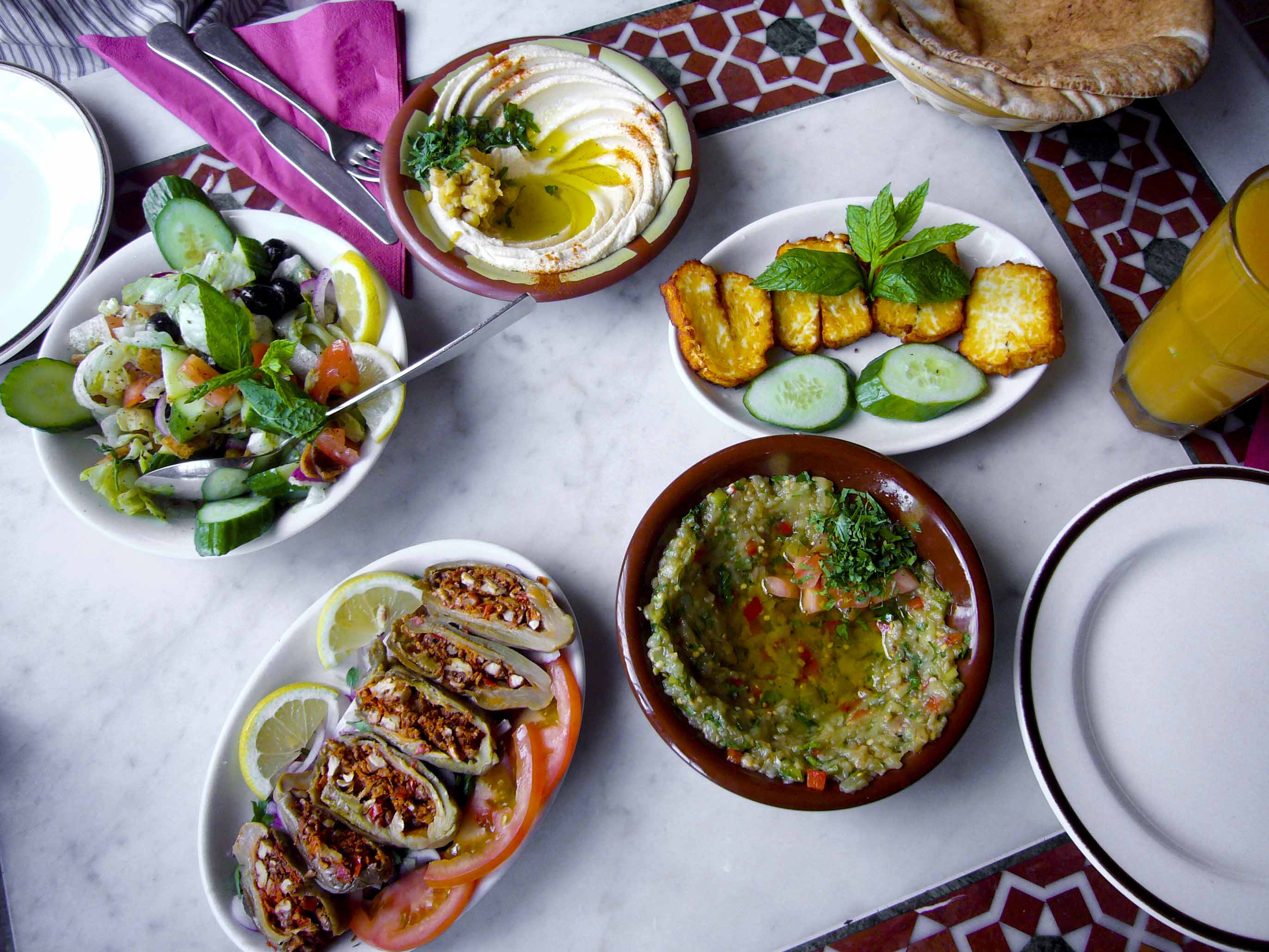
A Syrian meal, with makdous at the lower left of center. Continuing clockwise are a salad, hummus, haloumi and baba ganouj, with pita bread partially visible at the upper right corner.

Makdous (Arabic: المكدوس or sometimes المقدوس) is a dish of oil-cured aubergines. Part of Levantine cuisine (Syria, Jordan, Lebanon, and Palestine), they are miniature, tangy eggplants stuffed with walnuts, red pepper, garlic, olive oil, and salt. Sometimes chilli powder is added.

== Preparation ==
Makdous is usually prepared by Syrian households around fall to supply for winter, and is usually eaten during breakfast, supper or as a snack. It is also often served as an appetiser in restaurants. Syrians prepare makdous with a chili paste filling. After the eggplants are stuffed, they are preserved in olive oil. Before being stuffed, the eggplants are boiled until they are softened.

== Etymology ==
The name makdūs (مكدوس) is the past participle (اسم مفعول) form of the Arabic root كدس (kadasa), meaning "to heap" or "to pile", in reference to ingredients being stacked and packed together in oil.

== History ==
Pickled eggplants stuffed with various herbs and spices are mentioned in a 13th century Syrian cookbook called Kitab al-Wuslah ila l-habib.

During the Syrian civil war, the soaring cost of living turned makdous from a staple food in the Syrian pantry to a luxury. Enab Baladi reported the price of makdous reaching 500,000 Syrian Liras in 2025 in Damascus, the minimum wage being 750,000 at the time. It is typical for some Syrian families to stock up on tens of kilograms of makdous during fall to cover their needs during winter. The lack fo access to gas also contributed to the increased prices of makdous, as it takes approximately 4 hours of boiling to soften 20 kilograms of makdous

== See also ==
- List of stuffed dishes
- Stuffed eggplant
