= İmam bayıldı =

Turkish aubergine dish

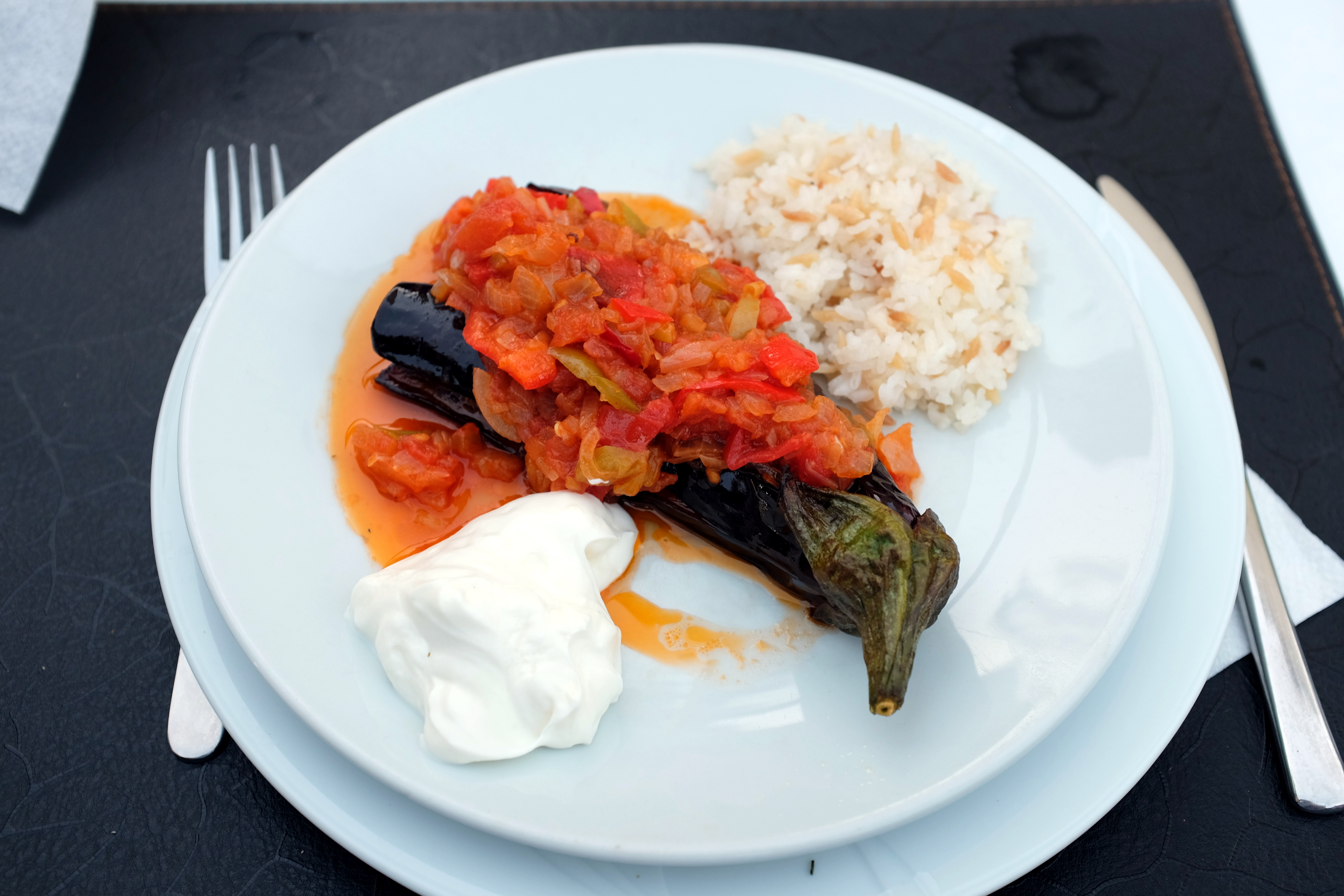
- A plate of İmam bayıldı served with yogurt and rice
- Alternative names: İmambayıldı
- Place of origin: Ottoman Empire
- Region or state: Turkey, Greece, Albania, Kosovo, Bosnia, Serbia, North Macedonia, Bulgaria, Armenia, Romania
- Associated cuisine: Ottoman
- Serving temperature: Room temperature or warm
- Main ingredients: Aubergines, onions, garlic, tomatoes, olive oil

İmam bayıldı (literally: "the imam fainted" in Turkish) is a Turkish dish consisting of whole aubergine stuffed with onion, garlic and tomatoes, and simmered in olive oil. It is a zeytinyağlı (olive oil-based) dish and is found in most of the former Ottoman regions. The dish is served at room temperature or warm.

== Origin of the name ==
Legend has it that Imam Bayıldı earned its name from an Imam (a religious leader) who fainted upon tasting the delectable flavors of this dish prepared by his wife.

A Turkish folk tale relates a different version in which the imam married the daughter of an olive oil merchant. Her dowry consisted of twelve jars of the finest olive oil, with which she prepared an aubergine dish with tomatoes and onions each evening until she had used all the oil, so she could not serve the dish on the thirteenth day. In response, the imam fainted. Yet another folk tale suggests that a Greek cook prepared it for the imam.

== Geographic distribution ==
Imam bayildi is also well-known under minor variants of the Turkish name in Bulgaria, North Macedonia, southern part of Romania (Brăila, Constanța etc), Greece (ιμάμ μπαϊλντί imám baildí), Albania and Kosovo (imam ballajdi), Armenia, and the Arab world (إمام بايلدي, imām bāyuldi), and in English as "Imam bayeldi". During Ottoman times, the dish also spread to Anatolia's Pontian minority; in their language, it's called imam-bayildin.

== Variants ==
An imam bayıldı made with ground meat becomes a karnıyarık.

== See also ==
- Caponata
- List of eggplant dishes
