= Arab cuisine =

Culinary traditions of Arab people

Arab cuisine refers to the regional culinary traditions of the Arab world, spanning the Maghreb (the west) and the Mashriq (the east). These cuisines are centuries old and reflect Arab trade in ingredients, spices, herbs, and commodities. The regions share many similarities, but also have unique traditions. Climate, cultivation, and commerce have influenced them.

Across the region, staple ingredients include wheat and rice, lamb and chicken, yoghurt and other dairy products, and a wide range of legumes and vegetables, seasoned with herbs and spices such as cumin, cinnamon, saffron, and sumac. Coffee and tea, often flavored with cardamom, are popular beverages along with arak in some places.

Hospitality and generosity towards guests are central to Arab food culture, typically shared through large shared meals, with regional customs dictating how guests are welcomed and received. During Ramadan, people break their daily fast each evening with iftar, traditionally with dates.

Regional cuisine varies considerably. Levantine cuisine is known for olive oil, za'atar, and mezze dishes such as hummus and falafel; Iraqi cuisine, documented in what is considered the oldest surviving food traditions, is associated with dishes such as masgouf. Egyptian cuisine centres on largely vegetarian staples including ful medames and Koshari; the Gulf and Arabian Peninsula have dishes such as kabsa and mandi. Yemeni food is distinct from neighbors, known for dishes such as saltah. Bedouin cuisine relies heavily on dates, dried fruits, and preserves suited to a nomadic lifestyle. Maghrebi cuisine from Morocco, Tunisia, Algeria, and Libya is built around couscous and is known for spice blends such as harissa.

== Medieval cuisine ==
Medieval Arab writers from the 9th to the 16th centuries wrote numerous cookbooks documenting nearly 4,500 recipes from the Arab world, spanning regions like Al-Andalus, Egypt, Syria, the Maghreb, and Iraq.

=== Breads ===
The white bread barazidhaj was made with high-quality wheat flour, similar to raqaq bread but thicker; the fermented dough was leavened usually with yeast and "baker's borax" (buraq) and baked in a tandoor. One poetic verse describing this bread:

"In the farthest end of Karkh of Baghdad, a baker I saw offering bread, wondrous fair.
From purest essence of wheat contrived. Radiant and absolute, you may see your image reflected, crystal clear.
Barazij rounds glowing with lovely whiteness, more playful than gorgeous singing girls,
They look like crystal trays, and were they indeed so, they would have served us as plates.

Raqaq bread was made in two varieties, labiq (soft, thin flatbreads) and jarmazaj (dry, thin bread flavored with tamarisk seeds).

=== Sauces ===
Numerous recipes for sauces (sibagh) have survived from historic Arabic cookbooks. The 10th-century Kitāb al-Ṭabīkh written by Ibn Sayyar al-Warraq gives several recipes to be served with roasted fish, attributed to various sources.

To Ibrahim ibn al-Mahdi are credited two sibagh recipes, one prepared by adding rue, caraway, thyme, asafetida and cassia to the mustard sauce, and another made by mashing vinegar-soaked raisins with garlic, walnut, mustard, vinegar, and seasonings like asafetida and anise.

From the seventh Abbasid caliph Al-Ma'mun's recipe collection comes a sibagh made with whey, walnut, garlic, olive oil and murri.

There are similar recipes meant for poultry dishes prepared with seasonings like ginger, pomegranate, spikenard, and cloves.

A surviving poem about sibagh is attributed to Caliph Al-Mu'tamid:

The concept of sibagh is so subtle that none but the wise its depths may sound.
Walnut and garlic with yogurt whey are the most you may need for it.
Or make it with vinegar, mahrut, and coriander. But with anjudhan it will be even better.
If not, then mustard and garlic mixed with anjudhan and onion, equal parts, will make your relish.
Or with just vinegar and onion eat your fish and it will still be a tasty dish.

=== Sweets ===
Described as the "food of kings" and "supreme judge of all sweets", lauzinaj was an almond-based confection that had entered medieval European cuisine by the 13th century from Andalusian influence, returning Crusaders and Latin translations of cookery books. There are two versions of the dish known from medieval texts:

1. Lauzinaj mugharraq or "drenched lauzinaj" is believed to be an earlier version of the Ottoman dish baklava. It was made by filling thin pastry dough with a mixture of ground almond (and sometimes other nuts like pistachio or walnut), rose water, and sometimes luxury flavorings like mastic, ambergris, or musk.
2. Lauzinaj yabis was made with ground almonds cooked in boiling honey or sugar until reaching a taffy-like consistency. The raw version, closer to marzipan in consistency, was made by blending the almonds with sugar and flavoring with camphor, musk, and rose water. The finished confection was molded into animal or other shapes, or cut into squares and triangles.

=== Vegetables ===
Vegetables include leeks, endive, melilot, fenugreek, okra, onions, purslane, Jew's mallow and radish. Boiled asparagus is served with olive oil and murri. The cooking water may be sweetened with honey and seasoned with cilantro, rue, anise and black pepper, and used as a beverage either by itself with honey, or added to wine.

Some vegetables are consumed raw, but asparagus, cauliflower, white soybeans, leeks, orach, a variety of mushroom known as ghushina, chard, cabbage, carrot, turnip, fresh fennel and eggplant are usually boiled.

Some vegetable dishes are served cold. One example of such a dish is eggplant with fried onion, fresh herbs and olive oil dressed with fermented sauces, vinegar and caraway. There are several cold eggplant dishes that are similar, some made with smoked eggplant, adding nuts like ground walnuts or almonds, and sometimes different seasonings like saffron, cassia, and galangal.

A dish for fried carrots with fresh herbs, dressing and spices was described by the poet Kushajim:

Dinars of carnelian and gold in a vessel so delicate, it may almost melt and flow.
All radiating with luster like carnelian shimmering on pearls.
In the vessel harmoniously combined, here together and there disperse.
The spices emitting fragrance like wine mingled with sweet breeze.
On top are pearls and silver decked with gems,
Which the cook delicately fashioned, a gorgeous dish with flavor and perfume.
The scattered rue is flowers of turquoise gems, vibrantly green,
Jiggling with murri and olive oil, ebbing and flowing with sheen.

== Diet and foods ==
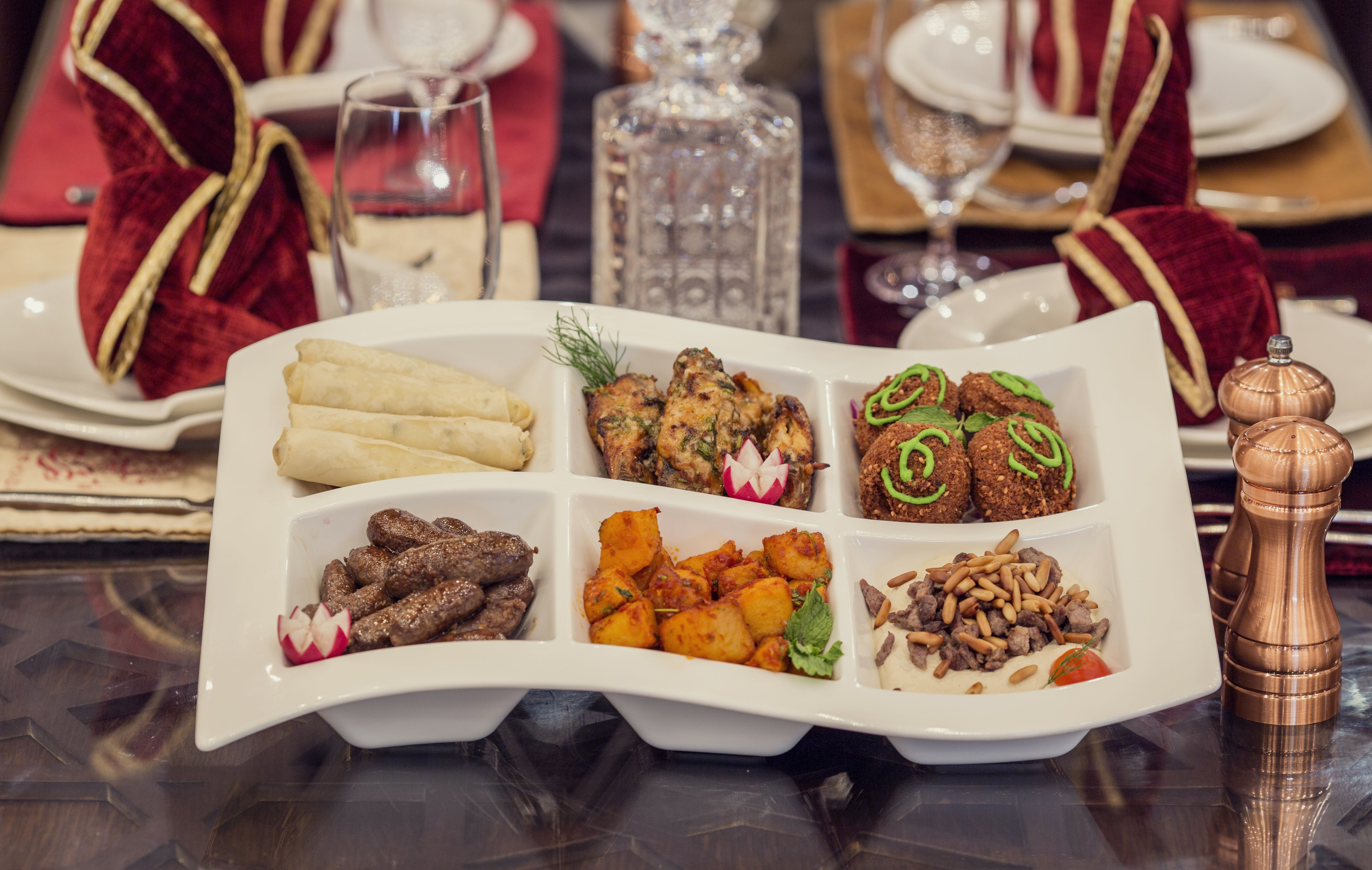
An Arab appetizer

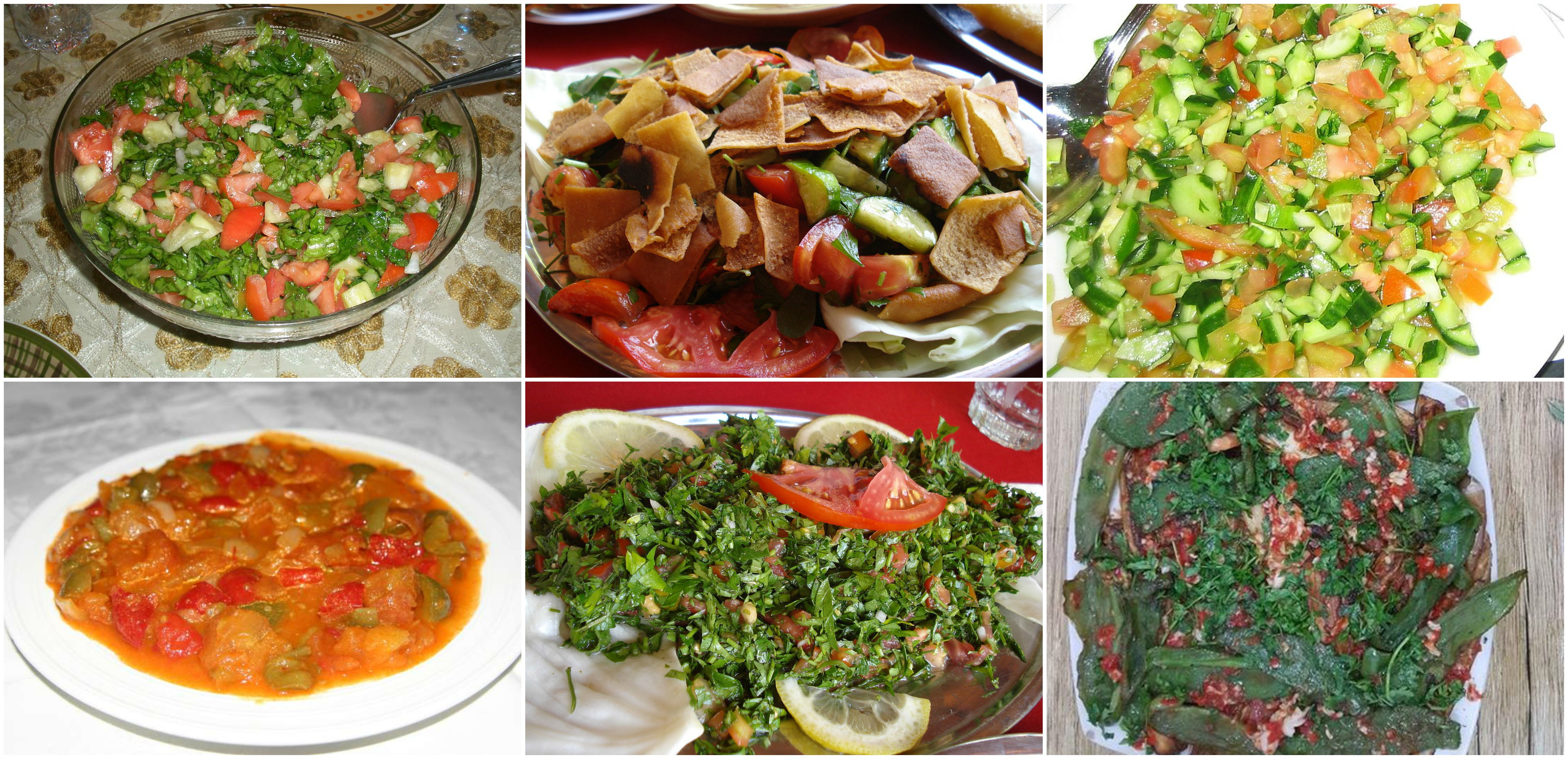
Arab salads: Arab salad, fattoush, matbucha, tabbouleh and raheb

Arab cuisine uses specific and unique foods and spices. Some of those foods are:

- Meat—lamb and chicken are the most used, followed by beef and goat. Other poultry is used in some regions, and fish is used in coastal areas including the Mediterranean Sea, Atlantic Ocean and the Red Sea. Some Christian Arabs eat pork.
- Dairy products—widely used, especially yogurt and white cheese. Butter, buttermilk and cream are also used extensively. Qishta cream is popularly used in desserts.
- Herbs and spices—include sesame, saffron, black pepper, allspice, turmeric, garlic, cumin, cinnamon, parsley, coriander and sumac. Spice mixtures include baharat, ras el hanout, za'atar, and harissa.
- Beverages—coffee and tea dominate, with coffee being more prevalent in the Middle East and tea prevailing in the Maghreb, Egypt, Sudan, Jordan, Palestine and some parts of Syria. Rose water and orange blossom water are also consumed occasionally. In the Levant, the main alcoholic drink is arak, a strong distilled spirit of the anise family.
- Grains—rice is the staple and is used for most dishes; wheat is the main source for bread. Bulgur and semolina are also used extensively. According to historic recipes known from Arabic cookbooks, grains were primarily used to make porridge and pasta type dishes in Arab cuisine until the 12th century. Two types of pasta were known: itriya, a short dry noodle of Greek origin similar to orzo, and rishta, a hand-cut fresh noodle of Persian origin. By the 13th century, the Turkic style tutmaj and salma noodles had entered the cuisine.
- Legumes—lentils are widely used in all colours, as well as fava beans, peanuts, chickpeas (garbanzo beans), scarlet runner beans, green peas, lupini beans, white beans, and brown beans.
- Vegetables—popular vegetables in Arab cuisine include carrots, eggplants, zucchini, artichokes, okra, onions, and olives. Potatoes are also eaten as vegetables in Arab culture.
- Fruits—pomegranate, dates, figs, oranges, citruses, watermelons, cantaloupe, honeydew melon, grapes, peaches, and nectarines are favored in Arab cuisine.
- Nuts—almonds, pine nuts, and walnuts are often included in dishes or eaten as snacks. Pistachios are particularly prevalent in Levantine desserts.
- Greens—parsley, coriander and mint are popular as seasonings in many dishes, while spinach and mulukhiyah (leaves from the plant of the Corchorus genus) are used in cooked dishes.
- Dressings and sauces—the most popular dressings include various combinations of olive oil, lemon juice, parsley, garlic, and tahini. Labneh (strained yogurt) is often seasoned with mint, onion, or garlic, and served as a sauce with various dishes, usually for breakfast.

== Structure of meals ==
There are two basic structures for meals in the Arab world: a regular schedule during most of the year and a second one unique to the month of Ramadan, in which observant Muslims fast from dawn until sunset.

=== Year-round ===
==== Breakfast ====
Breakfast is usually a quick meal, consisting of bread and dairy products, chiefly labneh and white cheeses, served with tea and sometimes fruit preserves. Manakeesh are also commonly eaten for breakfast.

==== Lunch ====
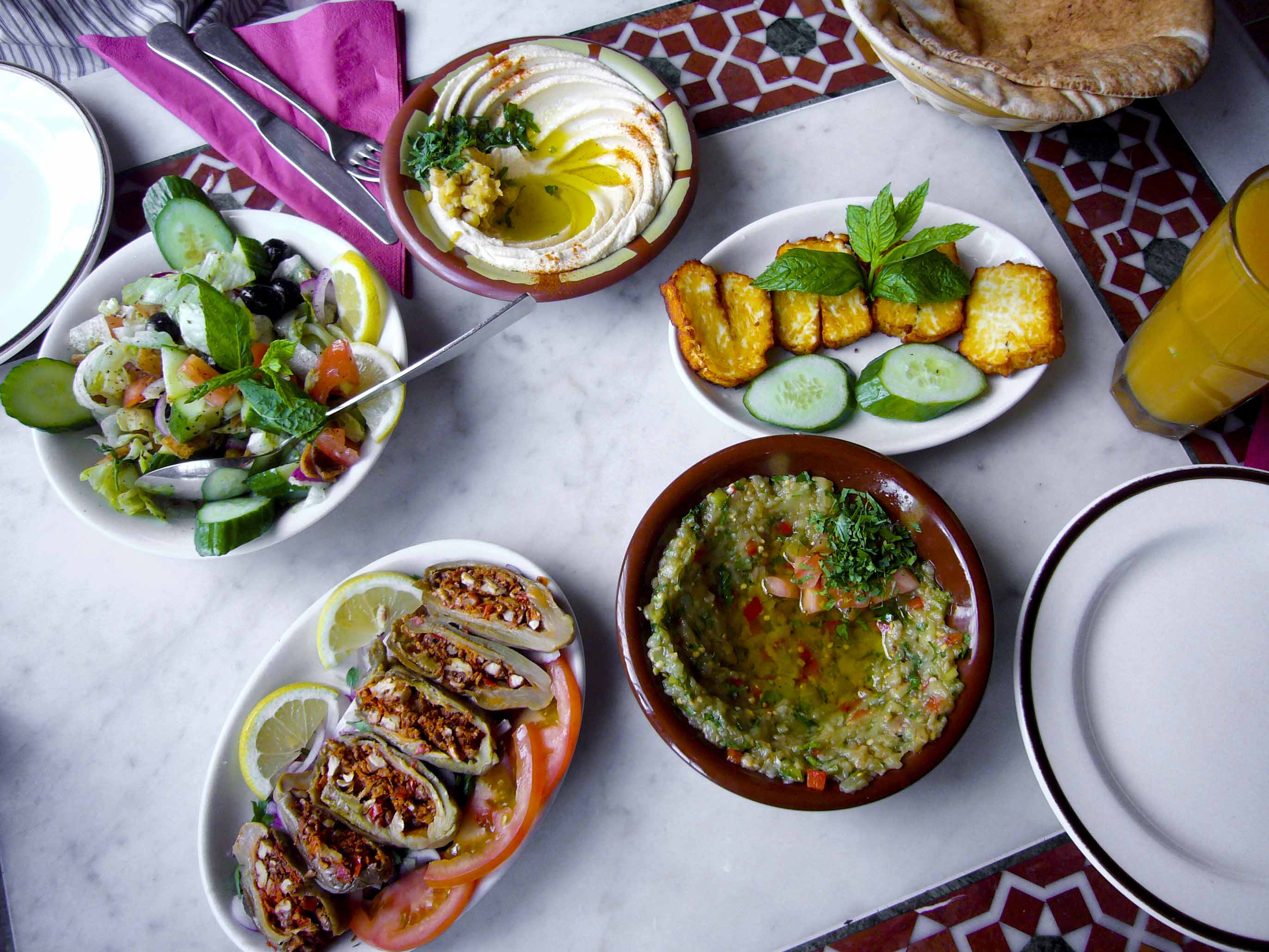
A spread of classic Levantine meze dishes, including, from top, clockwise: hummus, fried haloumi, baba ganouj, makdous and salad

Lunch is considered the main meal of the day. The main dish usually consists of meat (lamb, beef, poultry or fish) with rice, lentils, and vegetables (both fresh and cooked). The vegetables and meat are sometimes cooked together in a sauce (often tomato, although others are also popular). Salads and mezze are served as side dishes to the main meal. Most households add bread.

A variety of drinks can be served for lunch, such as ayran, tamarind, and various fruit juices. Regional drinks include karkadeh and erq sous in Egypt, and naqe'e al zabib in Yemen. With the advent of globalization, soft drinks have also become popular.

==== Dinner ====
Dinner is traditionally the lightest meal, although in modern times, dinner has become more important with regards to entertaining guests due to the hours of the workday.

=== Ramadan ===
==== Iftar ====
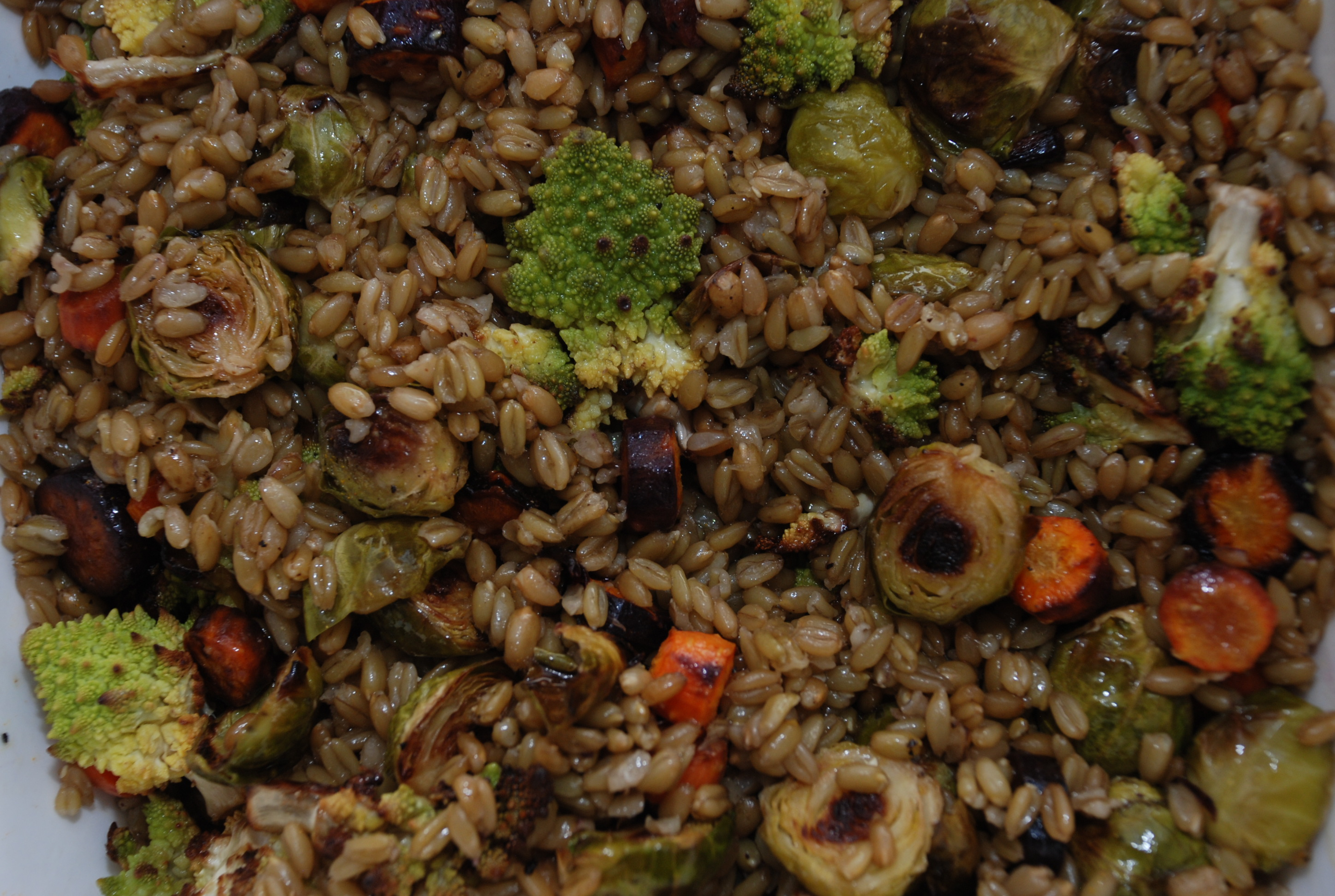
Freekeh with roasted vegetables

Iftar (also called Futuur) is the meal taken at dusk when the fast is over. In Islamic tradition, the fast is broken by eating a date.

This is often followed by a soup, often lentil soup, but also chicken soup, oat soup, or potato soup. Freekeh is also common.

The third course is the main dish, usually eaten after the Maghreb prayer is conducted. The main dish is mostly similar to what is served in lunch year-round, except that cold drinks are served. A particularly popular drink during Ramadan is Vimto.

==== Suhur ====
Suhur is the meal eaten just before dawn, when fasting must begin. It is eaten to help the person make it through the day with enough energy until dusk.

=== Sweets ===
In addition to the two meals eaten during Ramadan (one for dinner and one for Suhur before dawn), sweets are consumed much more than usual during the month of Ramadan; sweets and fresh fruits are served between these two meals. Although most sweets are made all year-round such as kanafeh, baklava, and basbousa, some are made especially for Ramadan, such as qatayef.

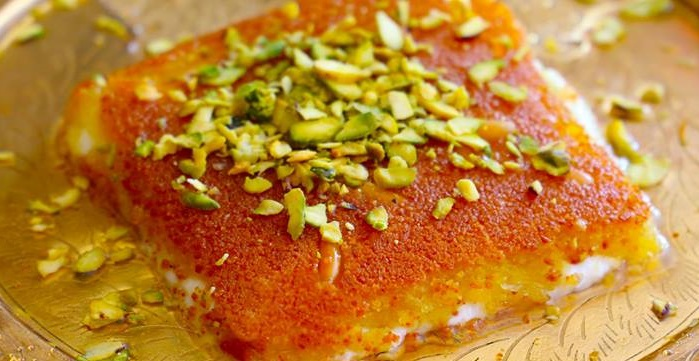
Kanafeh Nabulsieh from Nablus

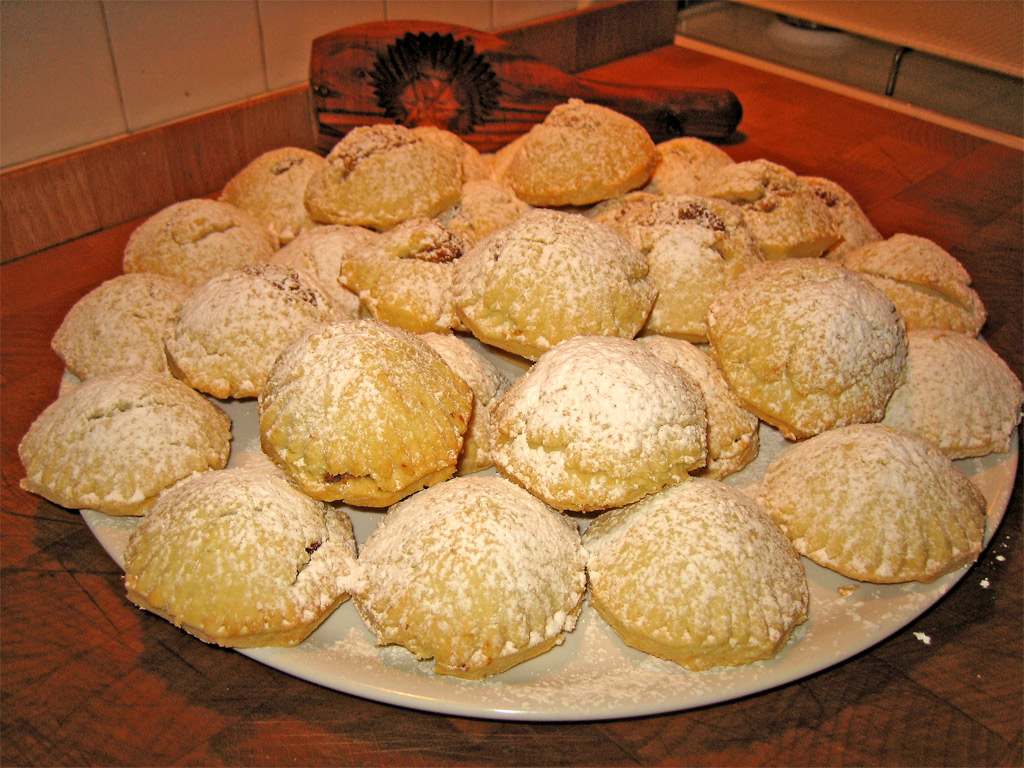
Ma'amoul; a filled butter cookie made with semolina flour

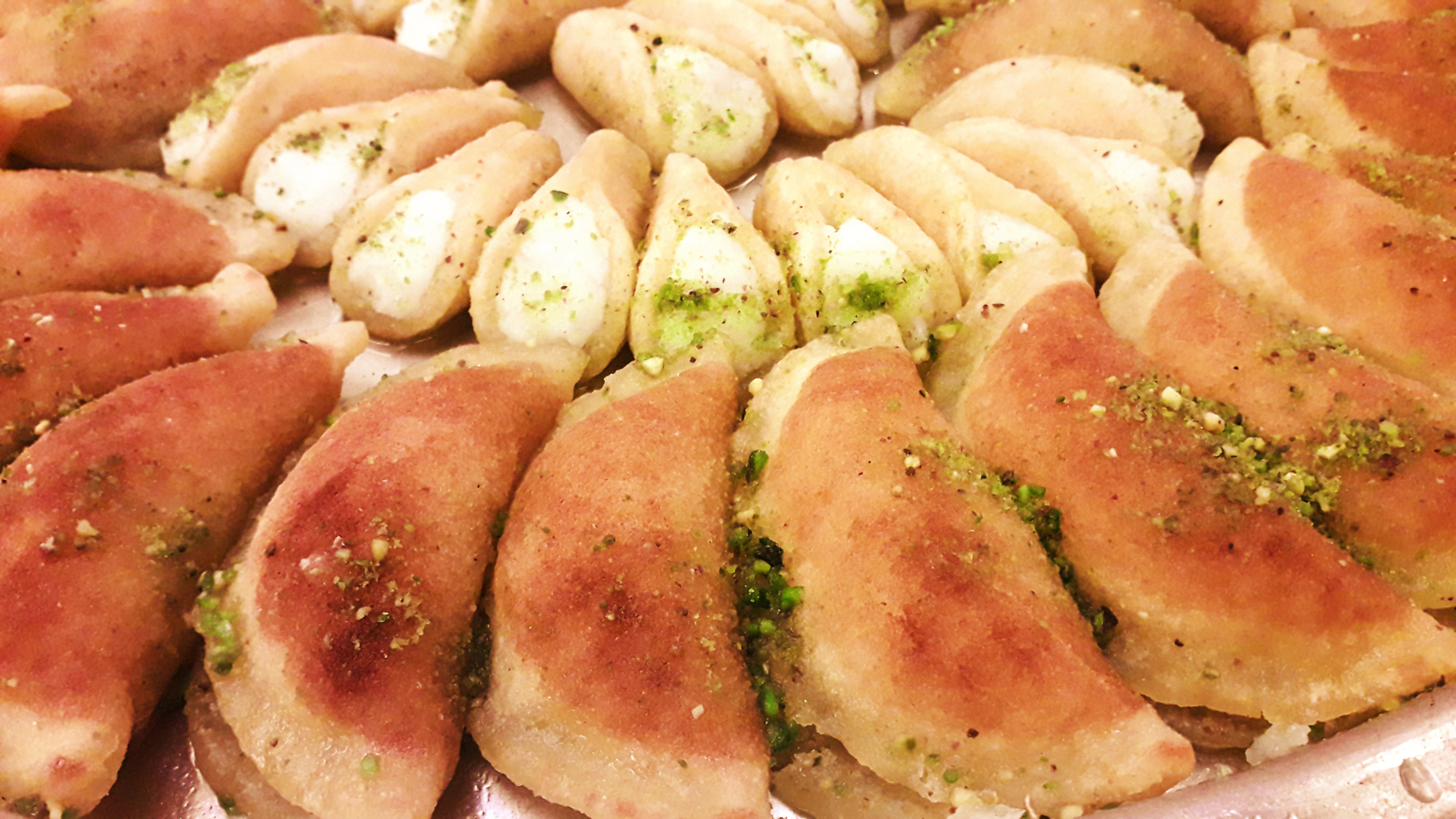
Qatayef; sweet dumpling filled with cream or nuts

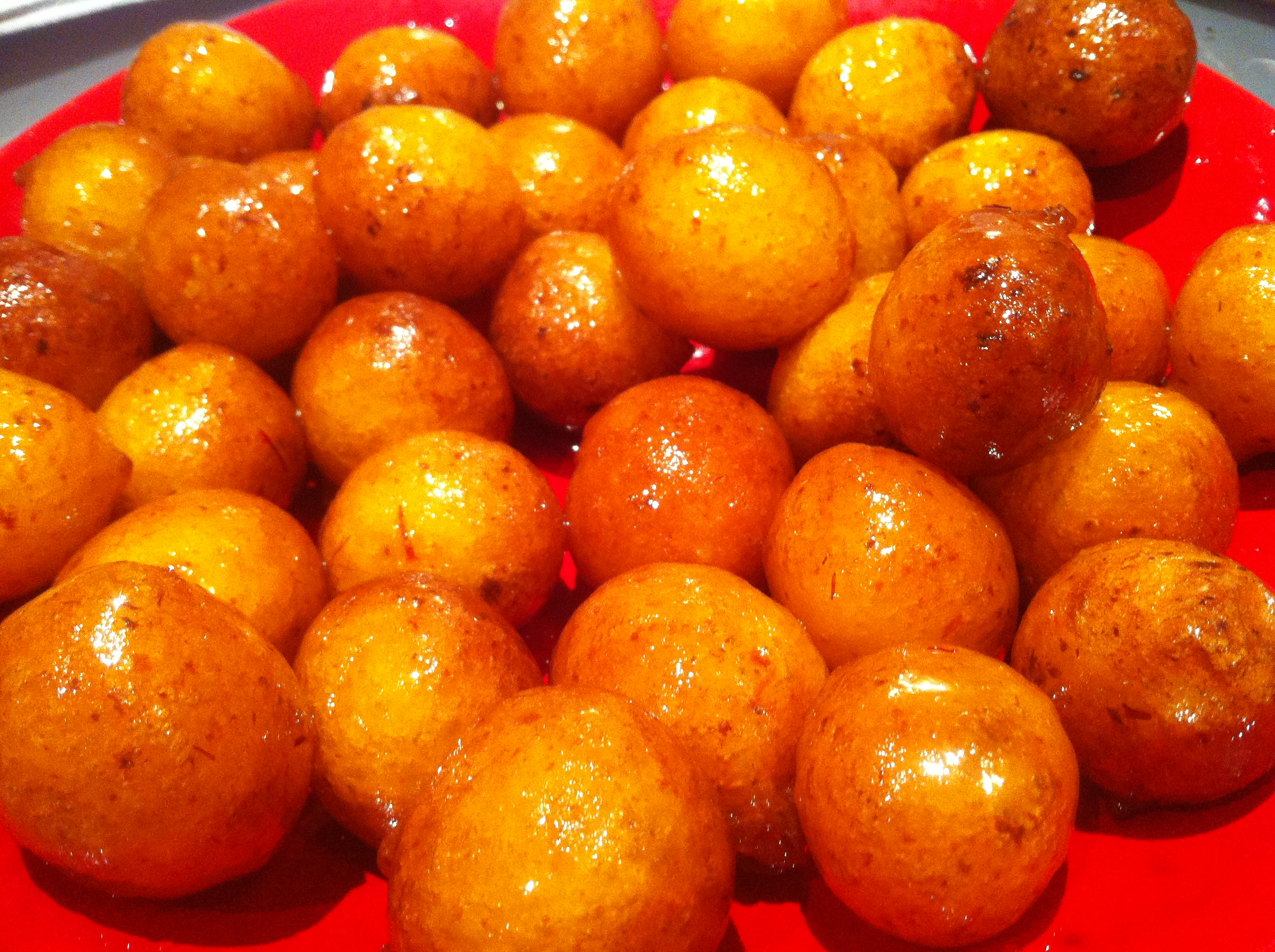
Luqmat al-qadi or luqaimāt or Awameh are eaten throughout the Arabic world

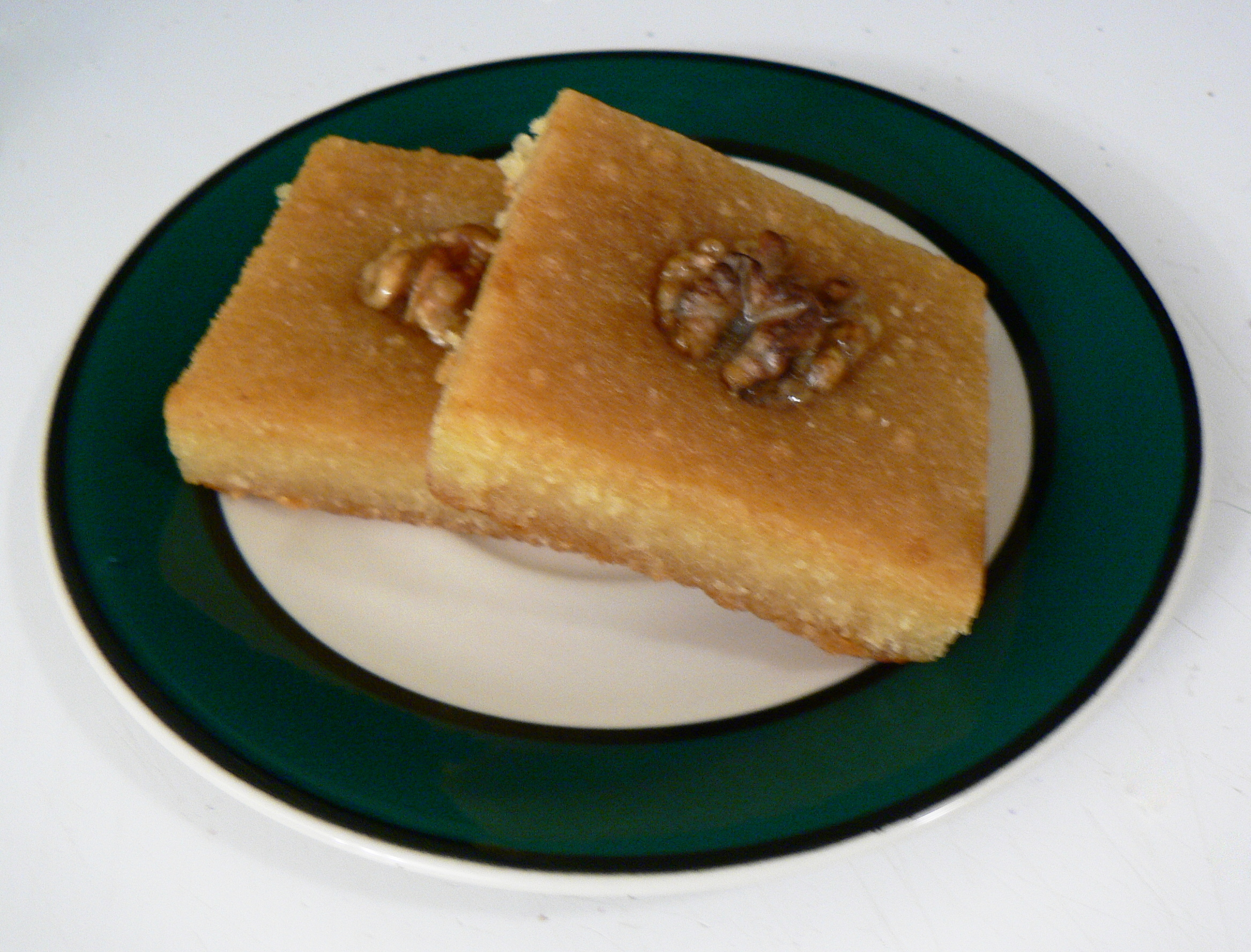
Basbousa; syrup-soaked semolina dessert popular throughout the Middle East and North Africa.

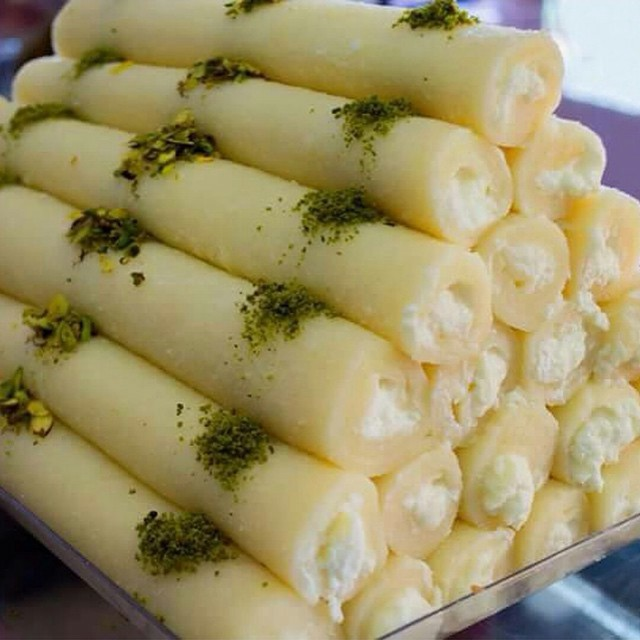
Levantine Halawet el jibn dessert; made of a semolina and cheese dough, filled with qishta.

== Arab hospitality ==
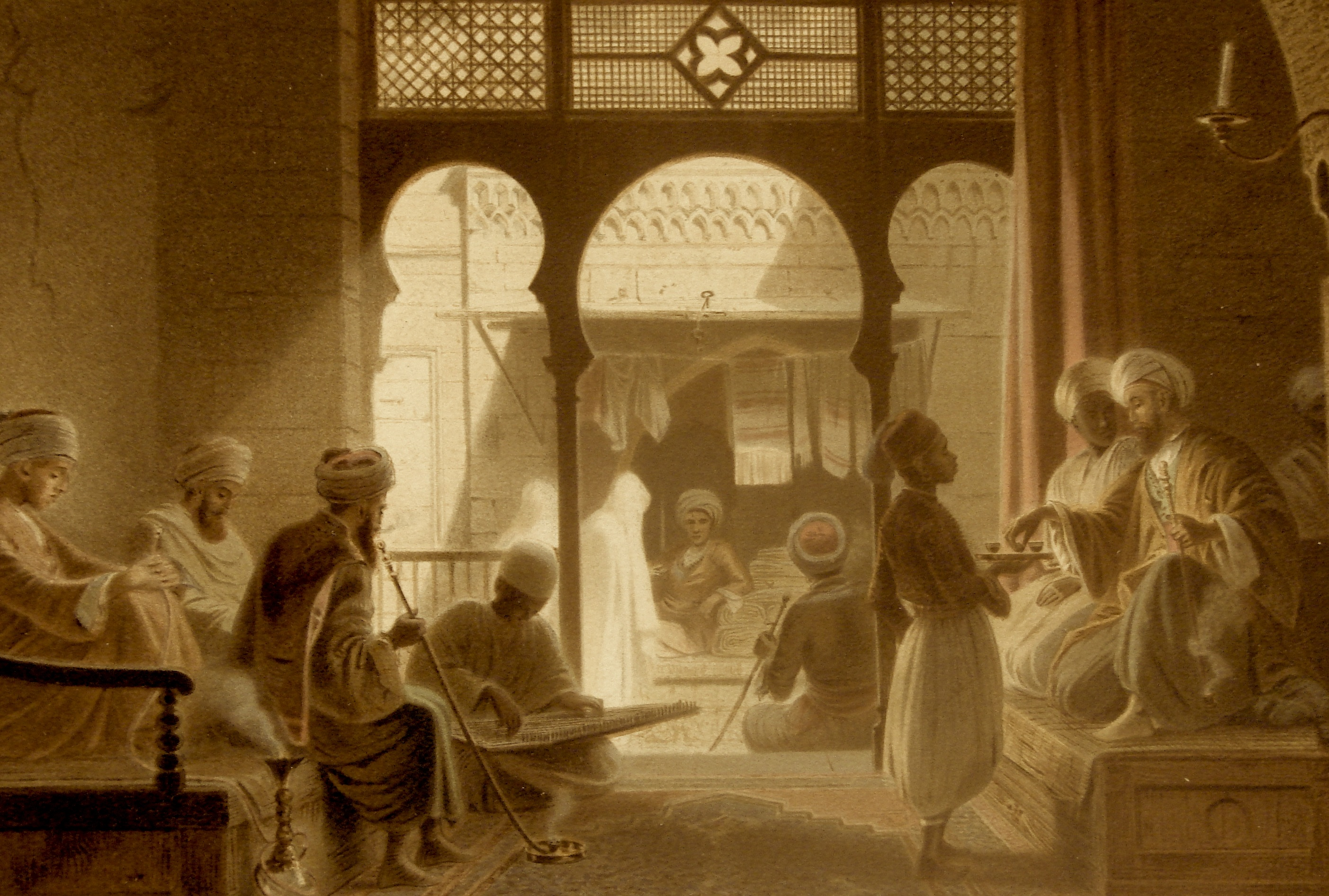
Coffeehouse in Cairo, 18th century

Essential to any cooking in the Arab world is the concept of hospitality and generosity. Meals are generally large family affairs, with much sharing and a great deal of warmth over the dinner table. Formal dinners and celebrations generally involve large quantities of lamb, and every occasion entails large quantities of Arabic coffee or Arabic tea.

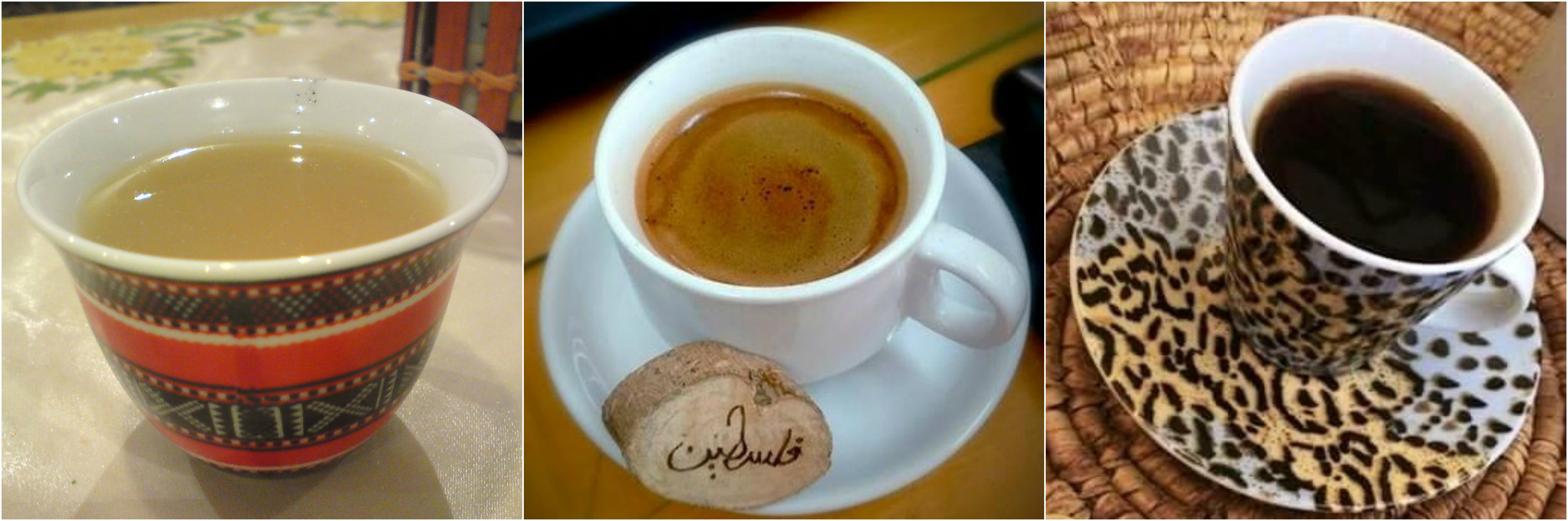
The different types of Arabic coffee: Hejazi/Najdi golden coffee on the left, Levantine coffee in the middle, and Levantine qahwah sādah (plain black coffee) on the right

A person who takes advantage of this hospitality, for instance, by attending feasts uninvited, is referred to as ṭufailī (Arabic: طفيلي, lit. 'infantile', or sponger), numerous stories about such persons can be found in Arabic literature.

=== Arabian Peninsula ===
==== Tea/Coffee ceremony ====
In the Persian Gulf region, a visitor is greeted by a great table of dried fruits, fresh fruits, nuts and cakes with syrup. Dried fruits include figs, dates, apricots and plums. Fresh fruits include citruses, melons and pomegranate. Arabic coffee and tea are common refreshments. Spices are often added to the coffee and other drinks.

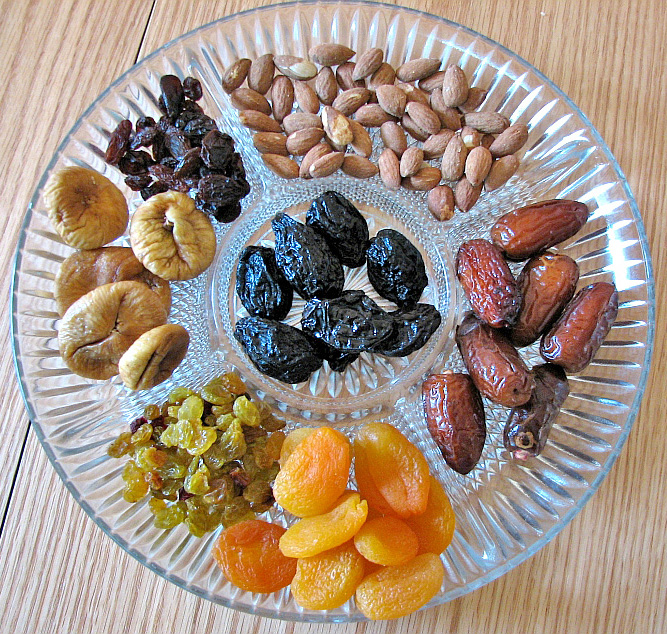
Dried fruits

==== Guest dinner ====
In the Khaleej al-Arab region, a guest should expect a dinner consisting of a very large platter called kabsa, shared commonly, with a large amount of spiced rice, with spicy lamb, chicken, or both as separate dishes, with various stewed vegetables, heavily spiced, sometimes with a tomato-based sauce.

Different types of bread are served with toppings specific to the region. Tea would certainly accompany the meal, as it is almost constantly consumed. Coffee would also be served.

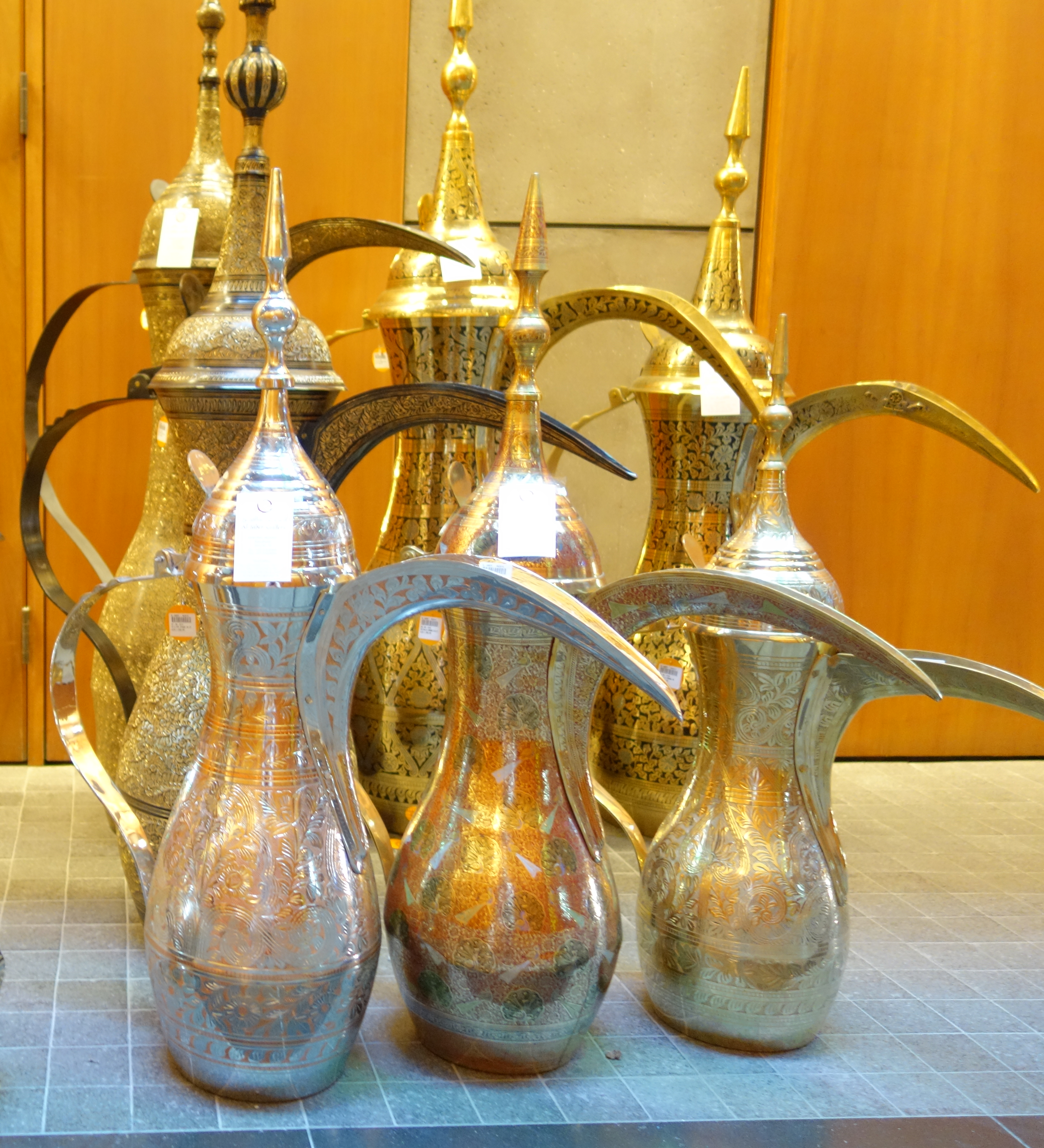
Dallahs for serving Arabic coffee

=== Maghreb ===
==== Tea/coffee ceremony ====
In the Maghreb region, a visitor will find a table full of bread-like snacks, including m’semen, baghrir, and other stuffed breads. These are served with honey, rosewater or olive oil.

There are also many different cookies and cakes included accompanied by plates with different kinds of nuts. Mint tea is often served with it in a traditional Maghrebian teapot.

==== Dinner guests ====
In the Maghreb region, a guest may find a table with different kinds of stews, called marqas or tajines. Dishes such as couscous and other semolina-based foods are also to be found.

These main dishes are accompanied by smaller mezze-like plates with salads, sauces and dips. Breads such as m'semen, khobz and baguette are used to eat the stews.

=== Levantine ===
==== Coffee/tea ceremony ====
In an average Arab Levantine household, a visitor might expect a table full of mezzes, breads topped with spices including za'atar and nuts. In the Levant, Arabic coffee is a much-loved beverage, but Arabic tea (usually Ceylon tea) is also enjoyed in Jordan, Palestine, and some parts of Lebanon & Syria.

==== Dinner guests ====
In the Levant, a guest will find a table with different kinds of mezzes, nuts, dips and oils. Mezzes include hummus, baba ghanoush, falafel, kibbeh, kafta, smoked vegetables and tabouli salads. The nuts can differ from almonds to walnuts, with different spice coatings. The dips and oils include hummus and olive oil.

=== Regional differences ===
There are many regional differences in the Arab cuisine. For instance, mujadara in Syria and Lebanon is different from mujadara in Jordan and Palestinian culture. Some dishes, such as mansaf (the national dish of Jordan), are native to certain countries and rarely, if ever, make an appearance in other countries.

Unlike most Western recipes, cinnamon is used in meat dishes, as well as in sweets such as baklava. Dishes such as tajine and couscous can differ from Morocco to Libya, each having their own unique preparation. Other dishes, such as the Andalucian-Moorish bastilla and albondigas have different traditional spice mixes and fillings.

Many Arabic food words are borrowed from Aramaic, the language originally spoken by the indigenous Christian inhabitants of Iraq and Syria.

== Regional Arab cuisines ==
=== Arabian Peninsula ===
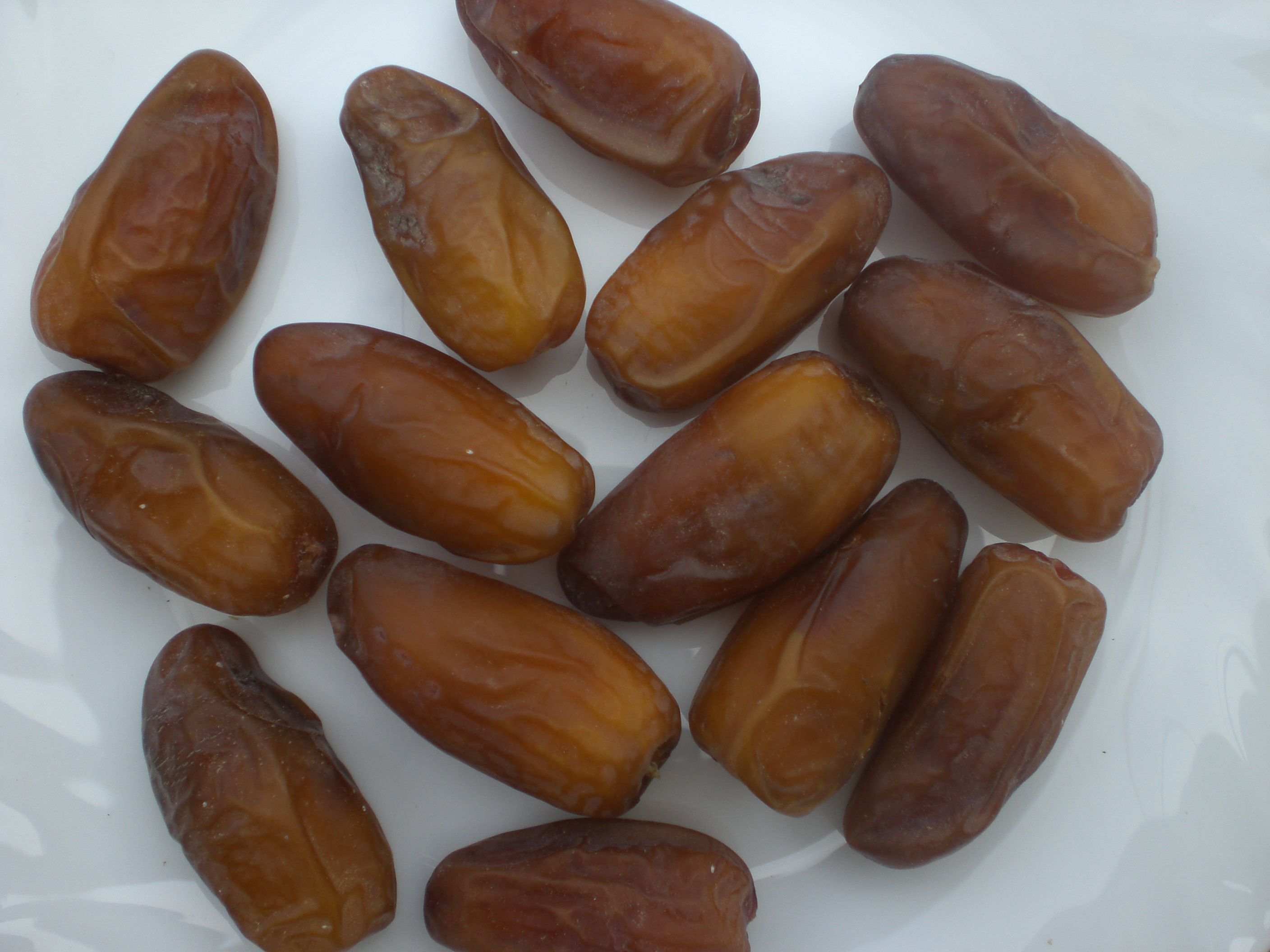
Dates are a staple in Arabian cuisine.

South Arabian and Eastern Arabian cuisine today is the result of a combination of diverse influences, incorporating Levantine and Yemeni cuisines.

Bukhari rice (رز بخاري) (ruz al Bukhari) is commonly eaten in the Hejaz region of Saudi Arabia. It is made with spicy tomato sauce, flavoured chicken and a fresh salad.

Kabsa (Arabic: كبسة, romanized: kabsah) or makbūs/machbūs (مكبوس Gulf pron.: [mɑtʃˈbuːs]) is an Arab mixed rice dish that originates from Yemen. It is commonly regarded as a national dish in all the countries of the Arabian Peninsula. It can also be found in regions such as southern Iran, Gaza in Palestine, and the Malabar Coast of India.

The cuisine of Yemen is in some ways distinct from other Arab cuisines. As in most Arab countries, chicken, goat, and lamb are eaten more often than beef, and fish is eaten mostly in coastal areas.

However, cheese, butter, and other dairy products are less common, especially in the cities and other urban areas. As with other Arab cuisines, the most widespread beverages are tea and coffee; tea is usually flavored with cardamom, clove, or mint, and coffee with cardamom. Karakaden, Naqe'e Al Zabib, and diba'a are the most widespread cold beverages.

Although each region has its own variation, saltah (سلتة) is considered the national dish of Yemen. The base is a brown meat is called maraq (مرق), a dollop of fenugreek froth, and sahawiq (سحاوق) or sahowqa (a mixture of chili peppers, tomatoes, garlic, and herbs ground into a salsa).

Rice, potatoes, scrambled eggs, and vegetables are common additions to saltah. It is eaten with flat bread known as mulawah, which serves as a utensil to scoop up the food.

Other dishes widely known in Yemen include aseed, fahsa, thareed, samak mafi, mandi, fattah, shakshouka, shafut, bint al-sahn, kabsa, jachnun, harees and Hyderabadi haleem.

Arabian Peninsula dishes

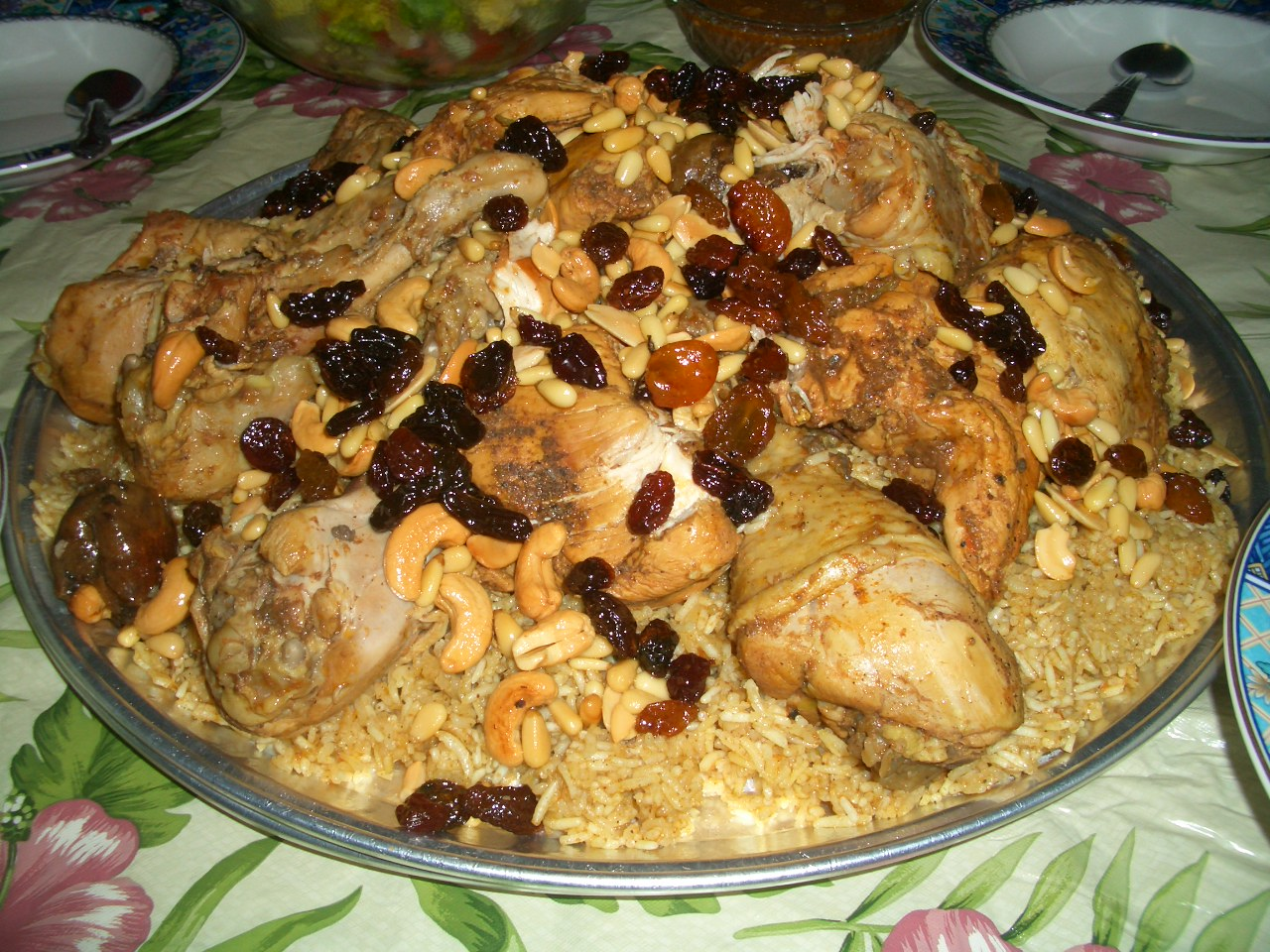
Kabsa, also known as machbūs

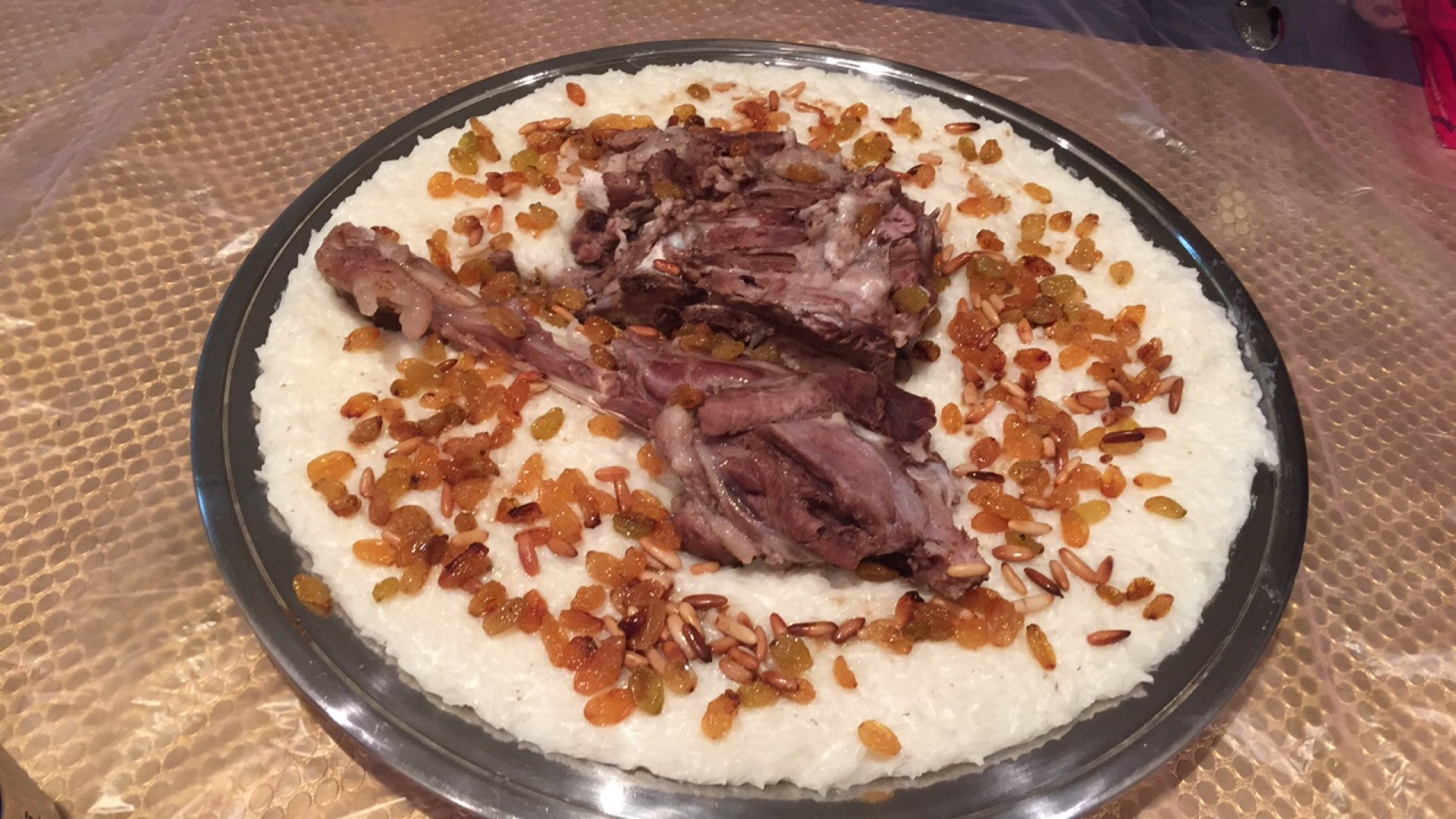
Saleeg, a dish from the Hejaz (western region) in Saudi Arabia

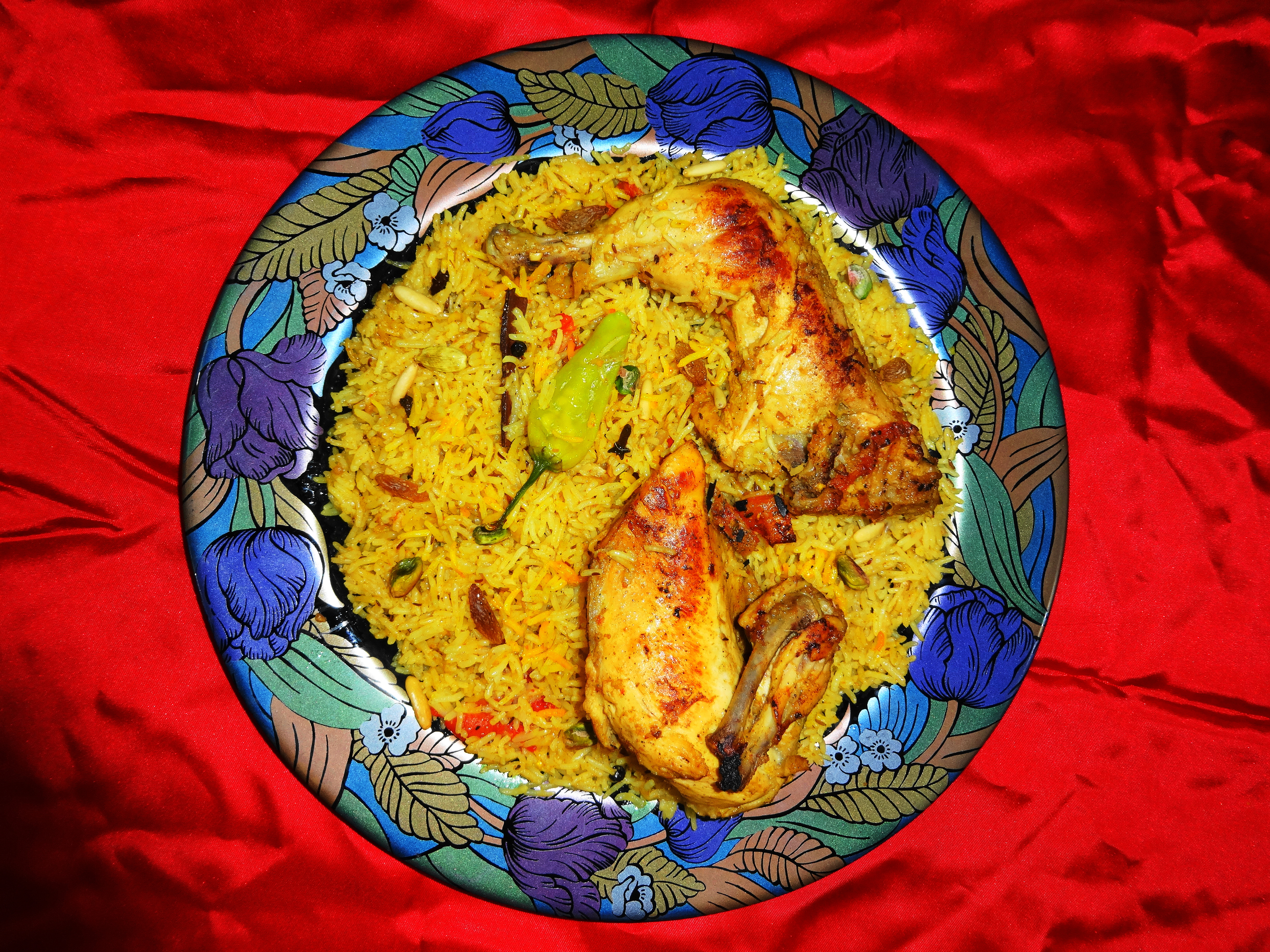
Mandi rice dish

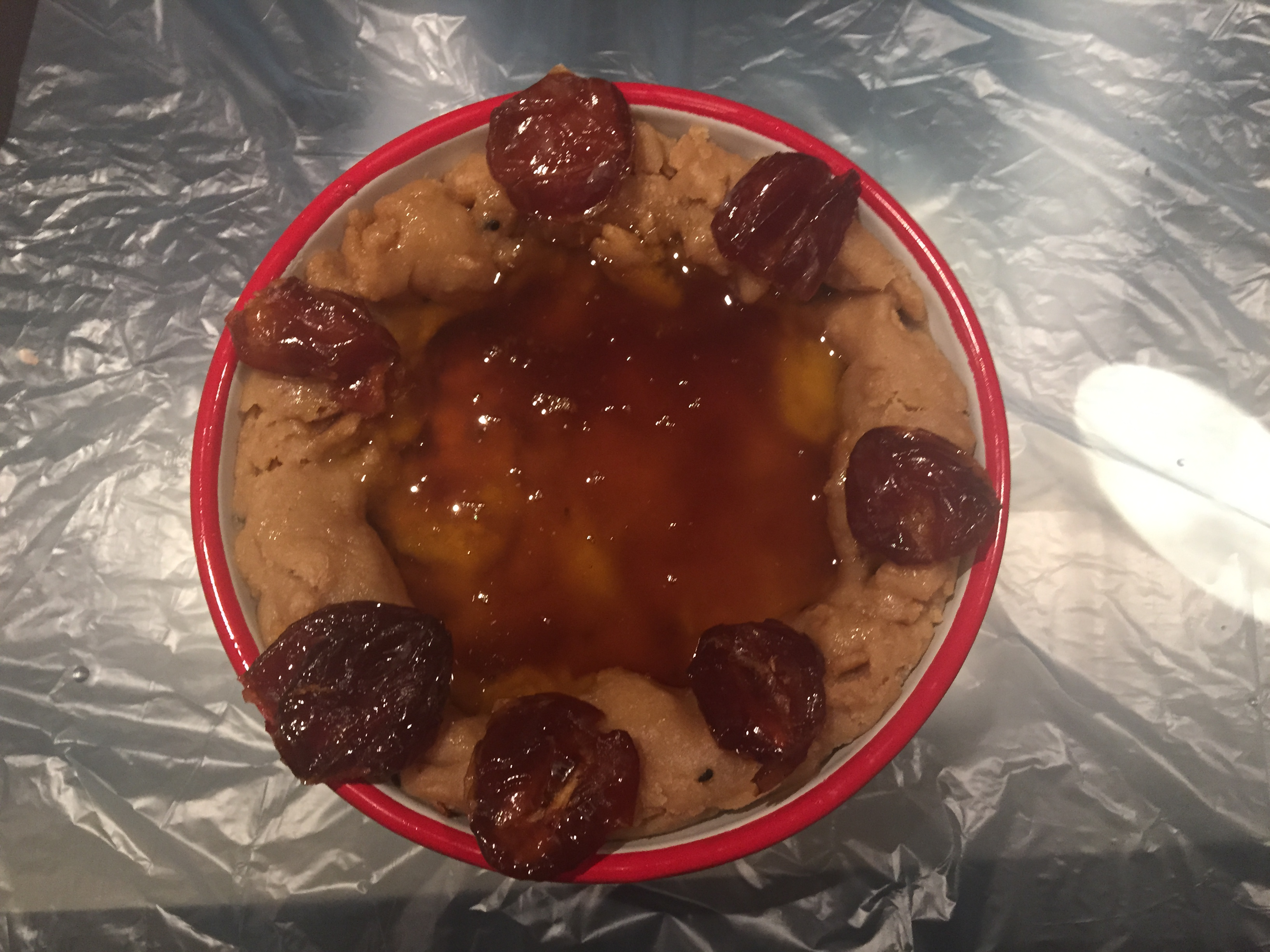
Arika from southern Saudi Arabia, primarily made of whole wheat flour, ghee, and honey

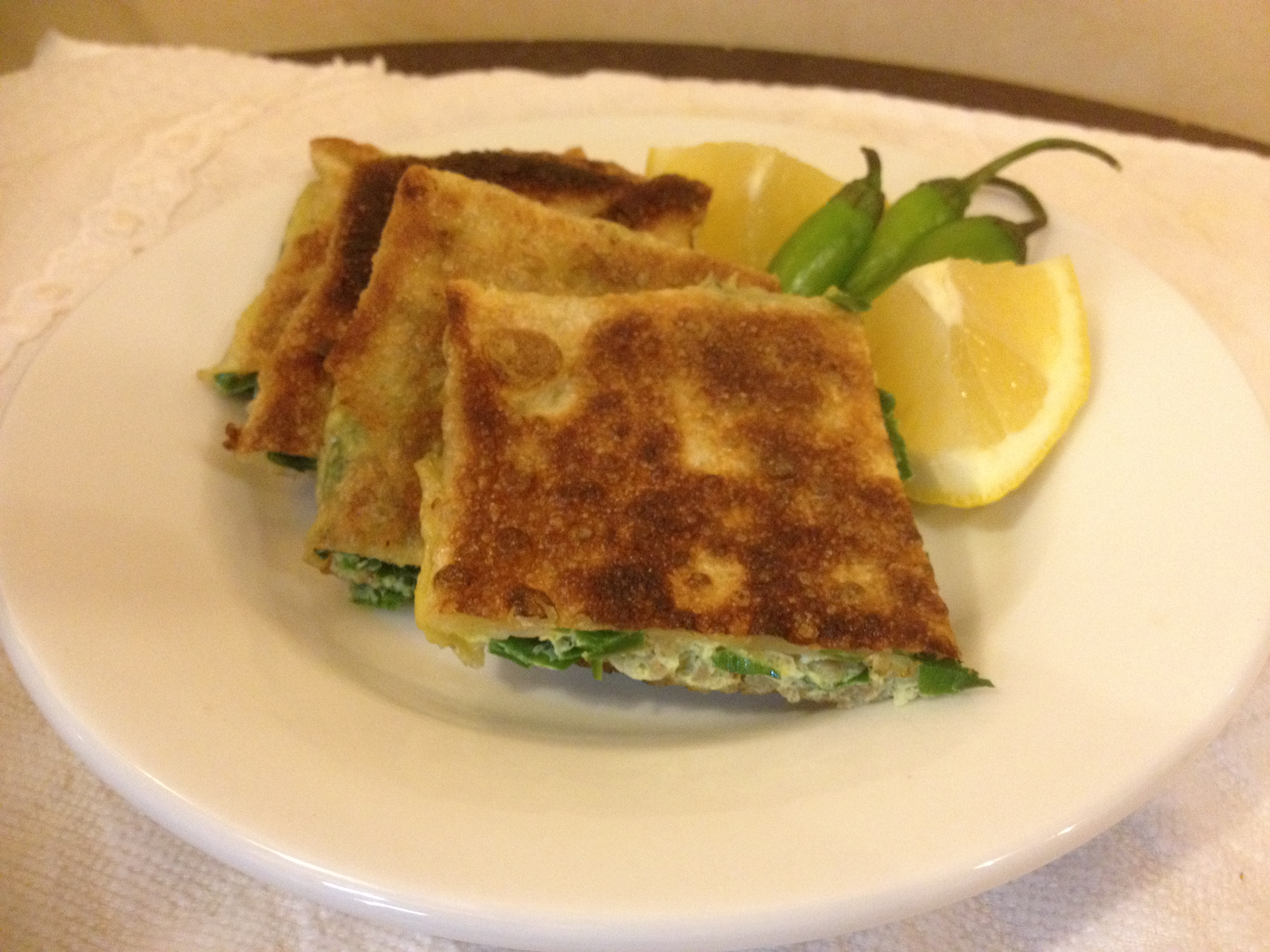
Mutabbak, a dish from the Arabian peninsula that was exported to South-East Asia (murtabak)

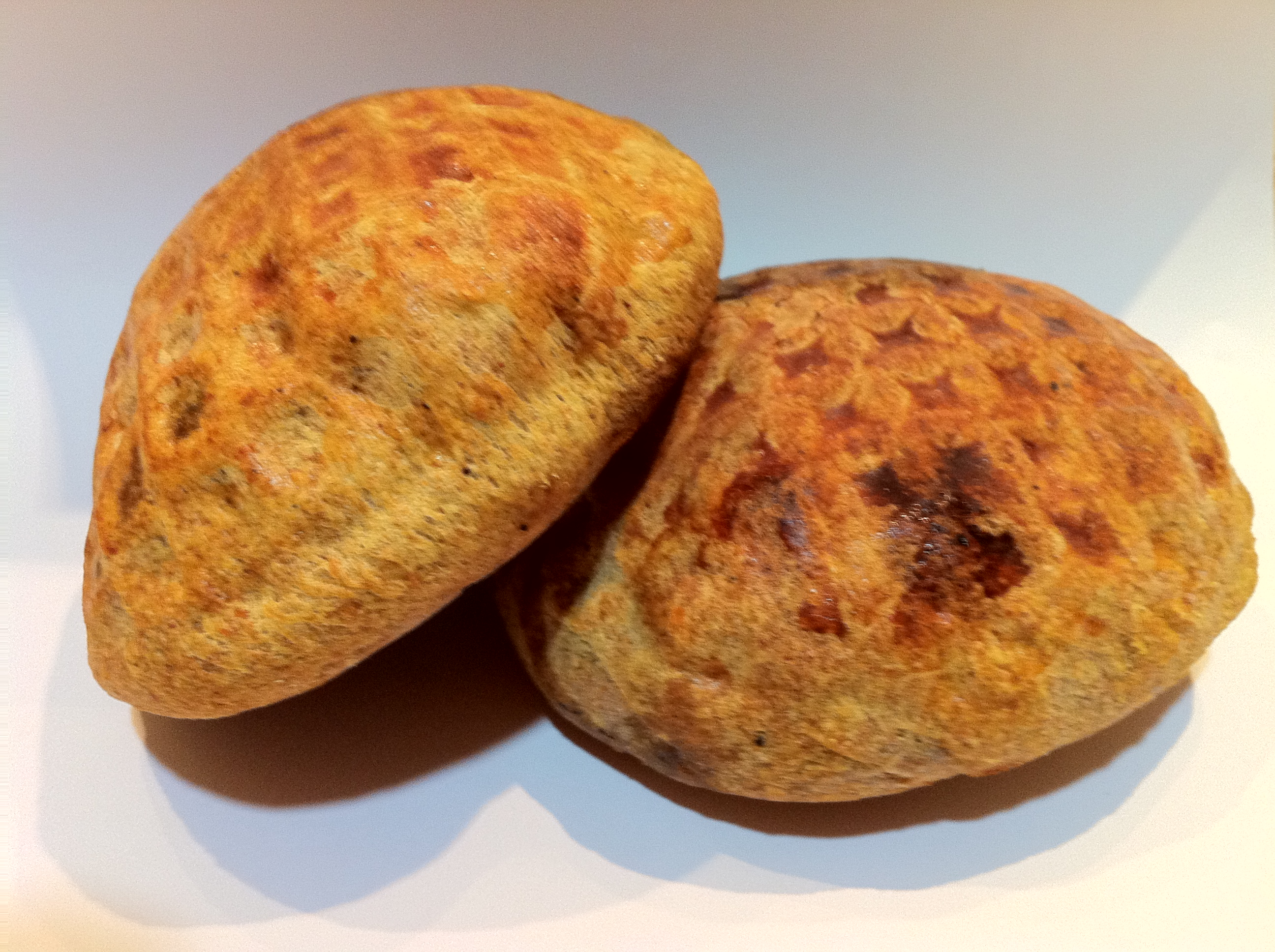
Kleeja, a type of cookie from central Saudi Arabia (different from the similarly-named Iraqi kleicha)

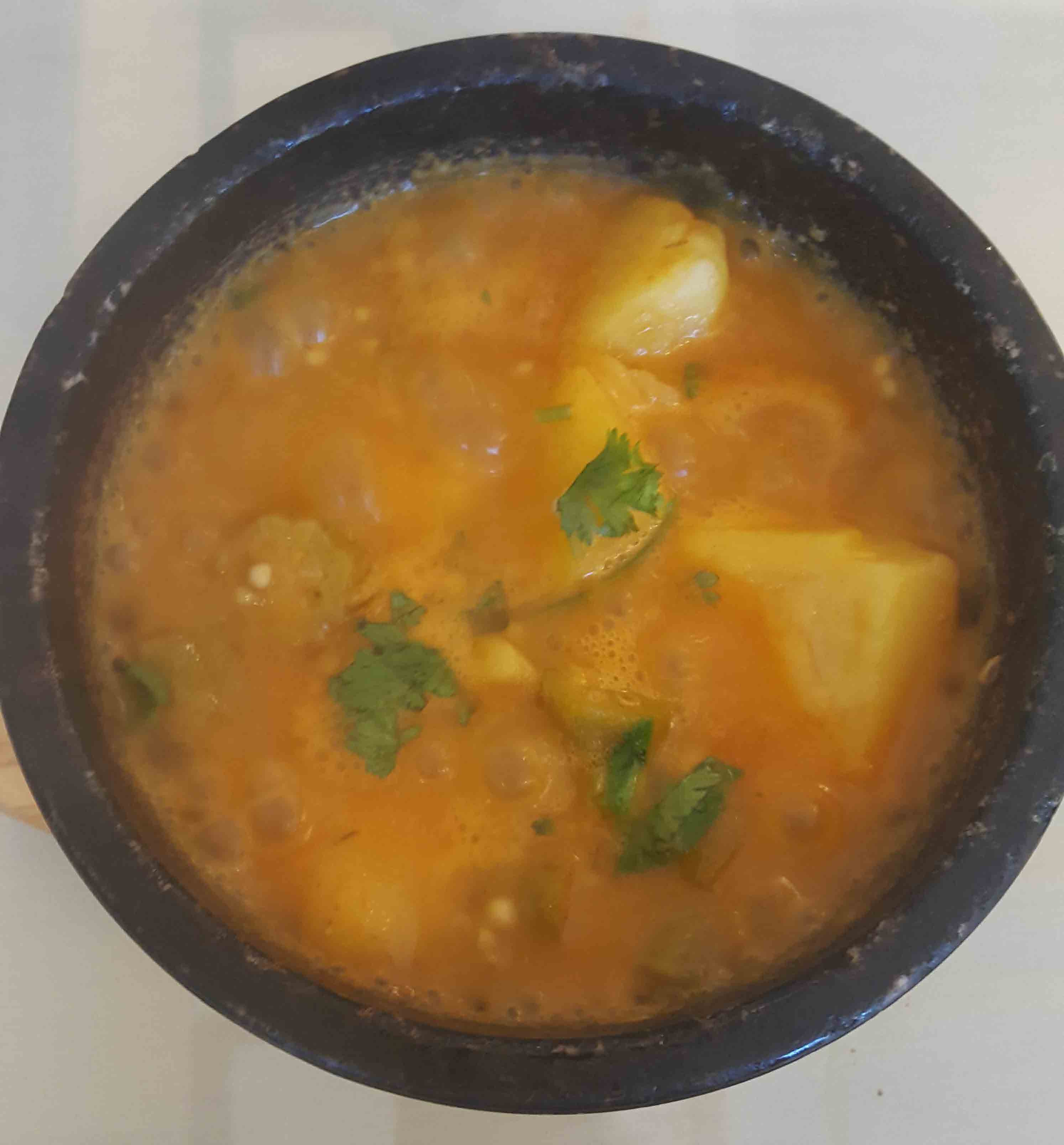
Yemeni saltah

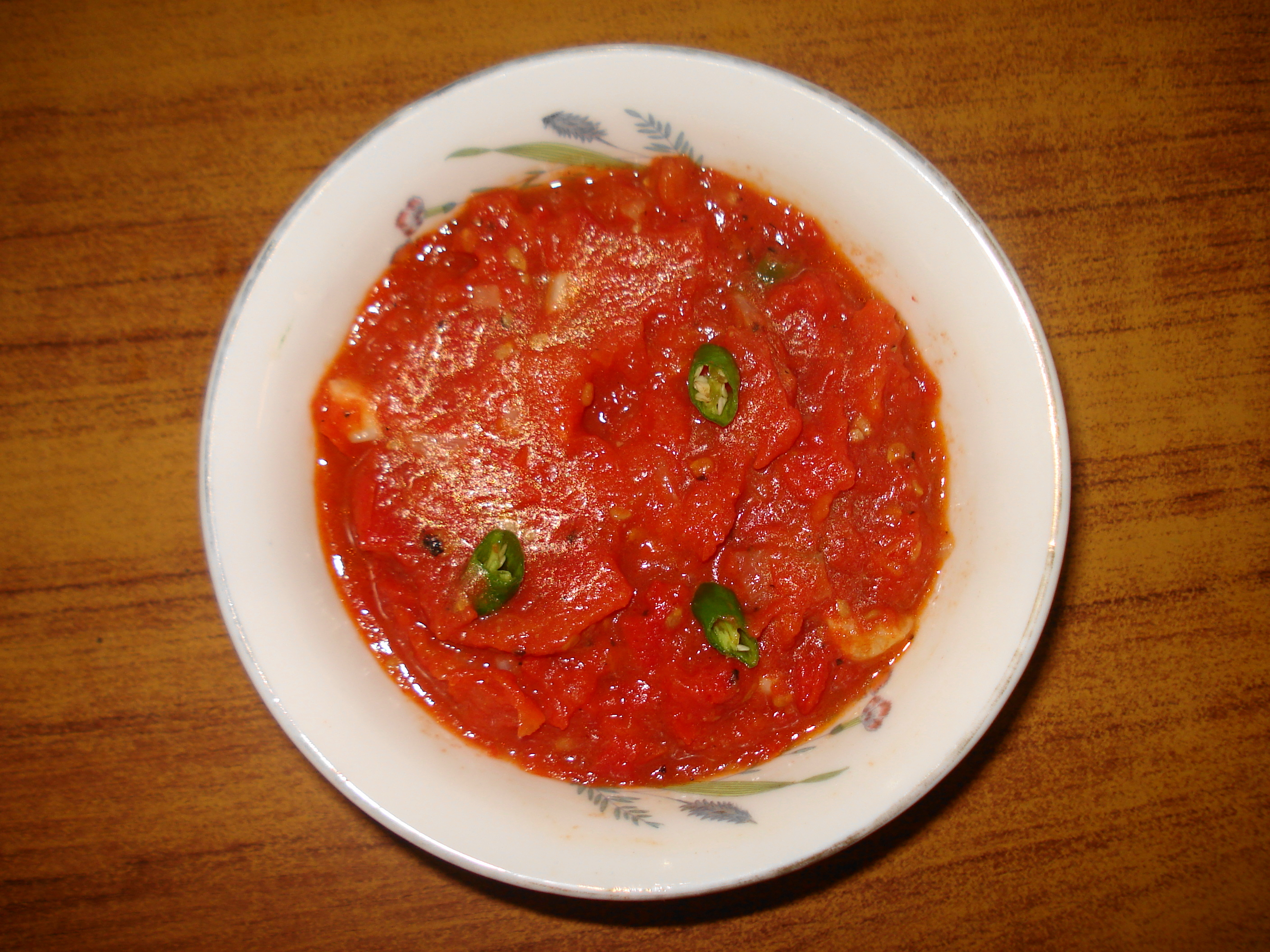
Daqqūs or duggus, a type of chili sauce

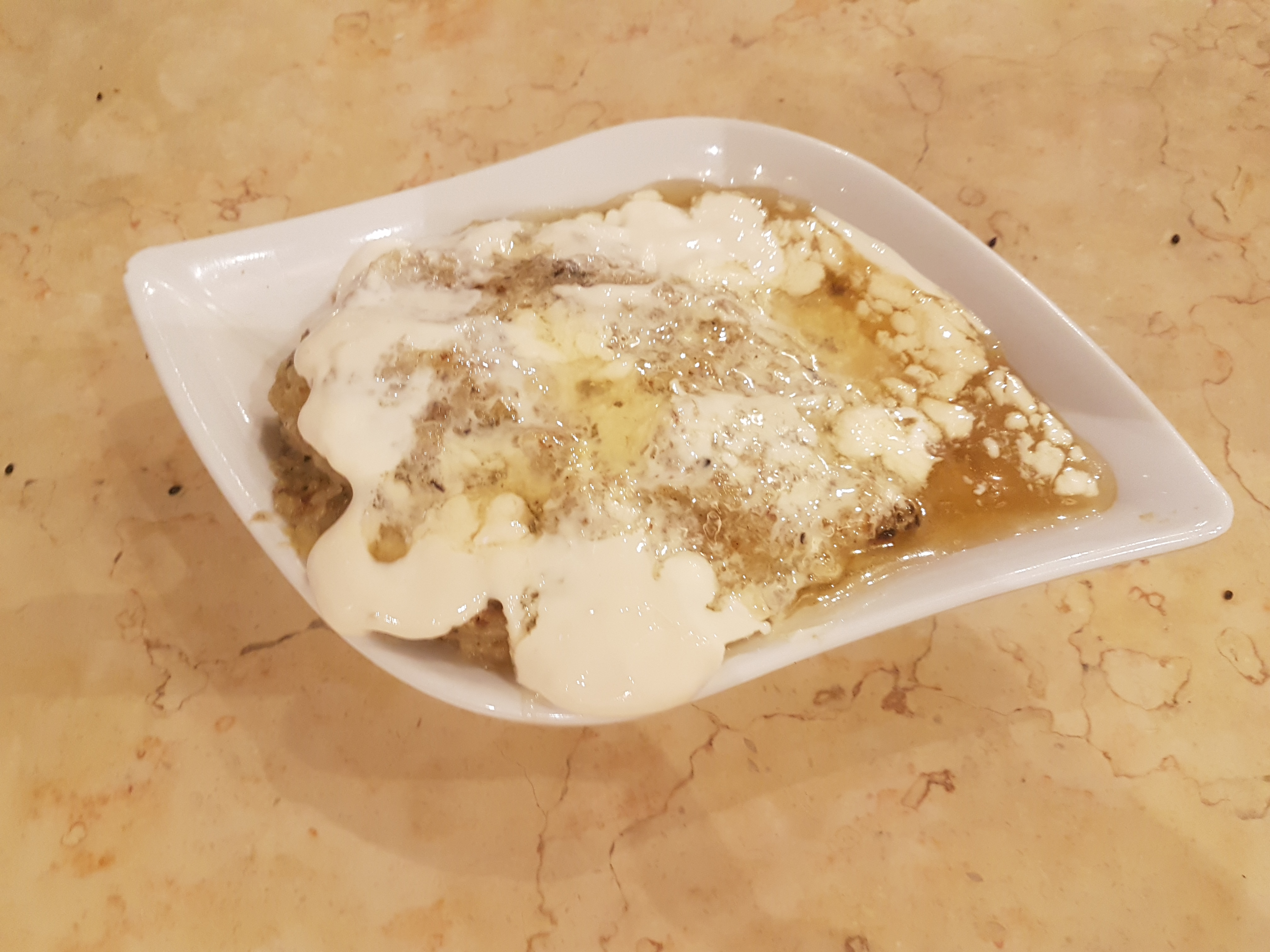
Masoob, made of bananas, ground flatbread, cream, cheese, honey, and sometimes dates

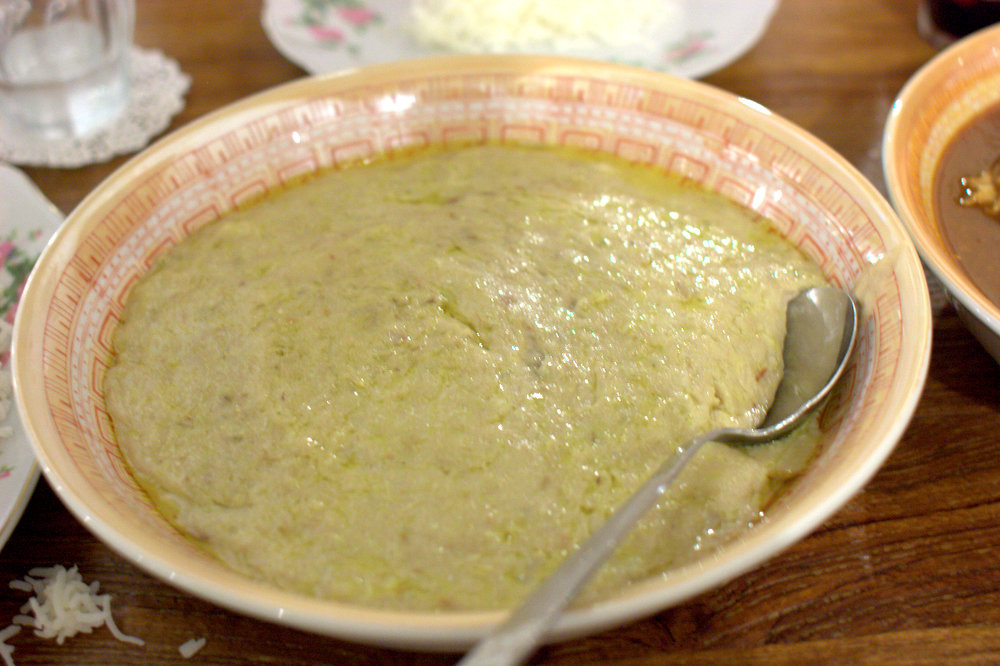
Harees هريس

=== Bedouin cuisine ===
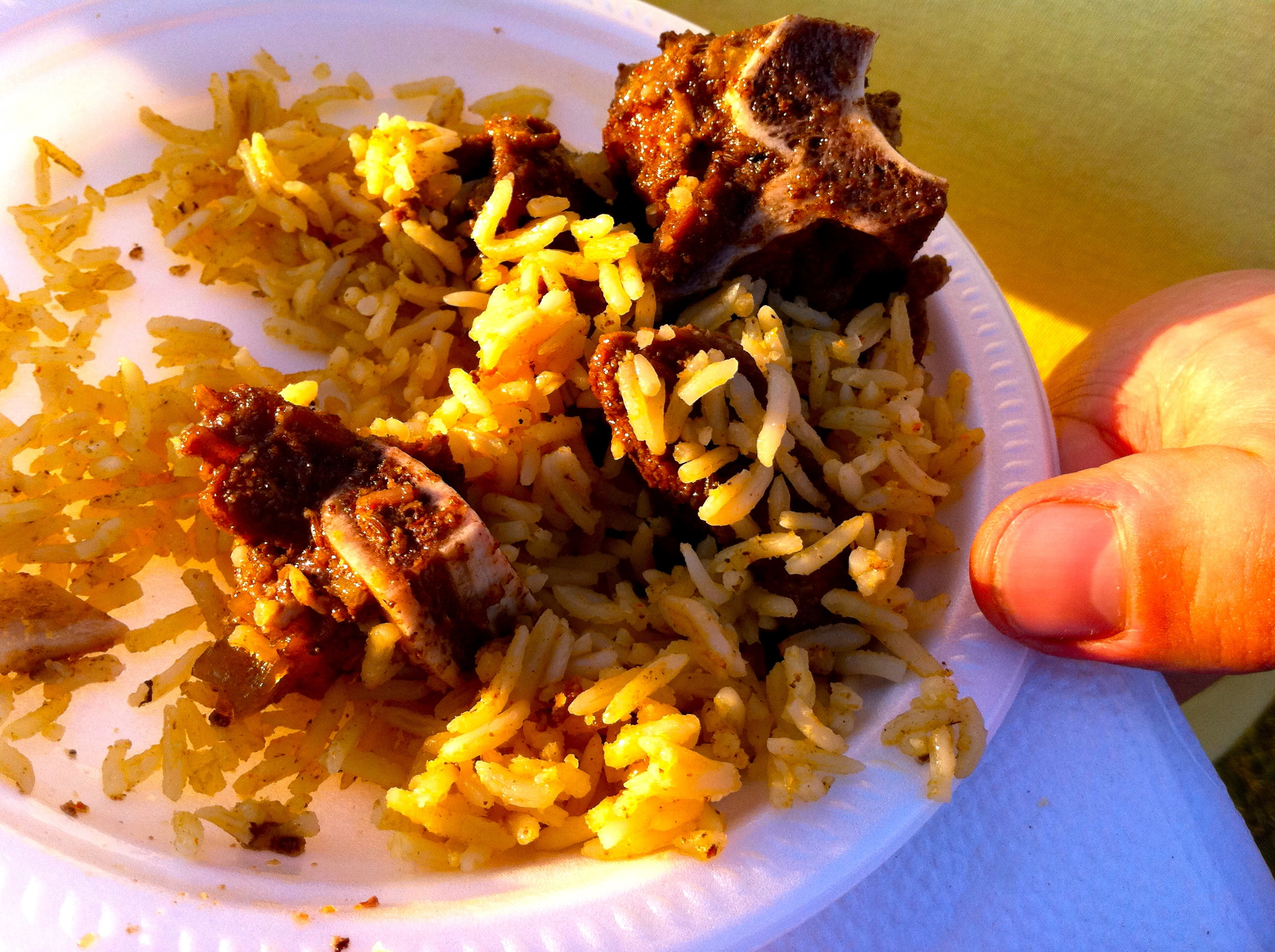
Camel meat

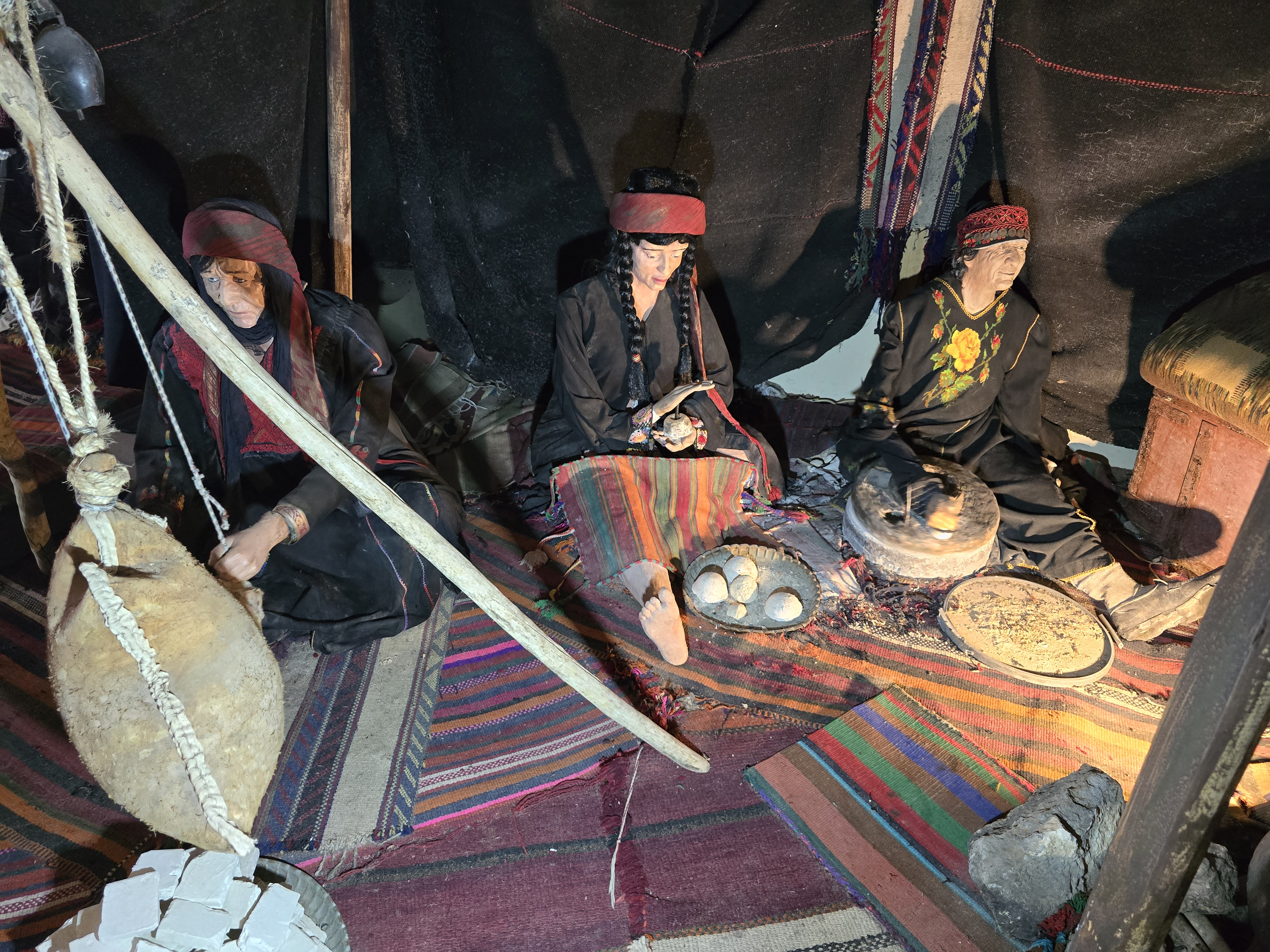
Bedouin women preparing Jameed, from a museum in Jordan.

The Bedouins of the Arabian Peninsula, Middle East and North Africa rely on a diet of dates, dried fruit, nuts, wheat, barley, rice, and meat. The meat comes from large animals such as cows, camels, goats, sheep and lambs. They also eat dairy products: milk, cheese, yoghurt, and buttermilk (labneh).

Preserved foods like samneh and jameed or dried fruits play a pivotal role in bedouin cuisine, who live in warm climates with no way to preserve perishable foods.

Bedouins also use many different dried beans including white beans, lentils, and chickpeas. Vegetables that are commonly used are those that could be dried, such as pumpkins, but also vegetables that are more heat-resistant, such as aubergines.

They drink fresh verbena tea, Arabic tea, Maghrebi mint tea, or Arabic coffee. A daily break to freshen up with drinks is traditional.

Common breads in the Maghreb are khobz and khaleej. Traditional dishes such as marqa and tajines (stews) are also regularly prepared.

Breakfast consists of baked beans, bread, nuts, dried fruits, milk, yoghurt, and cheese with tea or coffee. Snacks also include nuts and dried fruits.

=== Levant ===
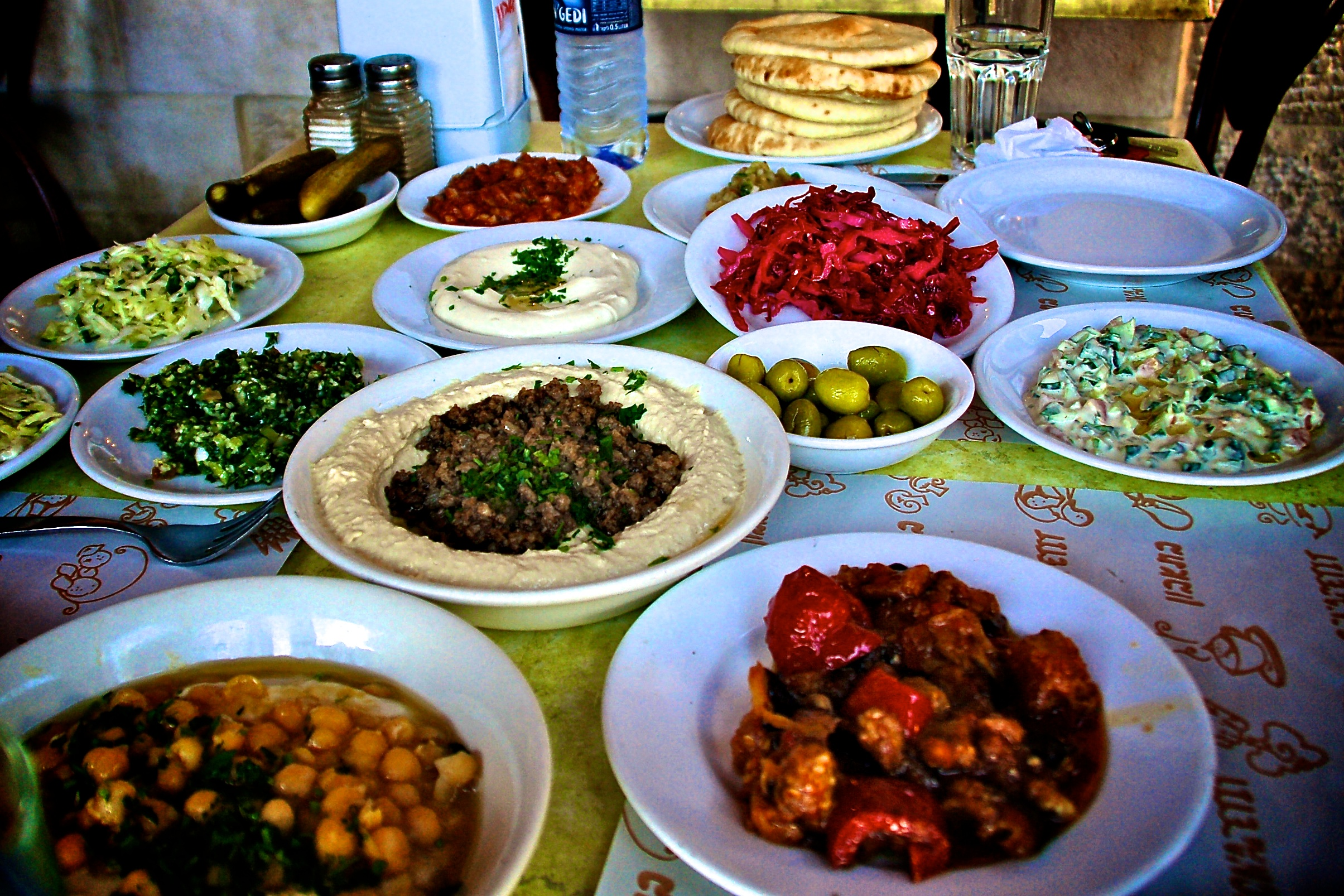
A typical Levantine mezze

Levantine cuisine is the traditional cuisine of the Levant. Although divided into Syria, Lebanon, Turkey, Jordan, Israel, and Palestine, the region has historically been more united, and shares many culinary traditions. Although very similar, there is some variation within the Levantine area.

The main ingredients used include olive oil, za'atar, garlic, olives, and rice, and common dishes include a wide array of mezze or bread dips, stuffings, and side dishes such as hummus, falafel, ful, tabouleh, labaneh, and baba ghanoush.

Salads are often seasoned with lemon juice or pomegranate molasses. Foods are either grilled, baked, fried, or sautéed in olive oil; butter and cream are usually reserved for desserts. Vegetables are eaten raw, pickled, or cooked.

Levantine cuisine is also famous for its wide range of cheeses, including shanklish, halloumi, and arisheh.

The main alcoholic drink in the Levant is arak, a strong distilled spirit of the anise drinks family (like the Greek ouzo and the French pastis). Levantine cuisine also incorporates wines made in Syria and Lebanon, such as the renowned Domaine de Bargylus.

Levantine dishes

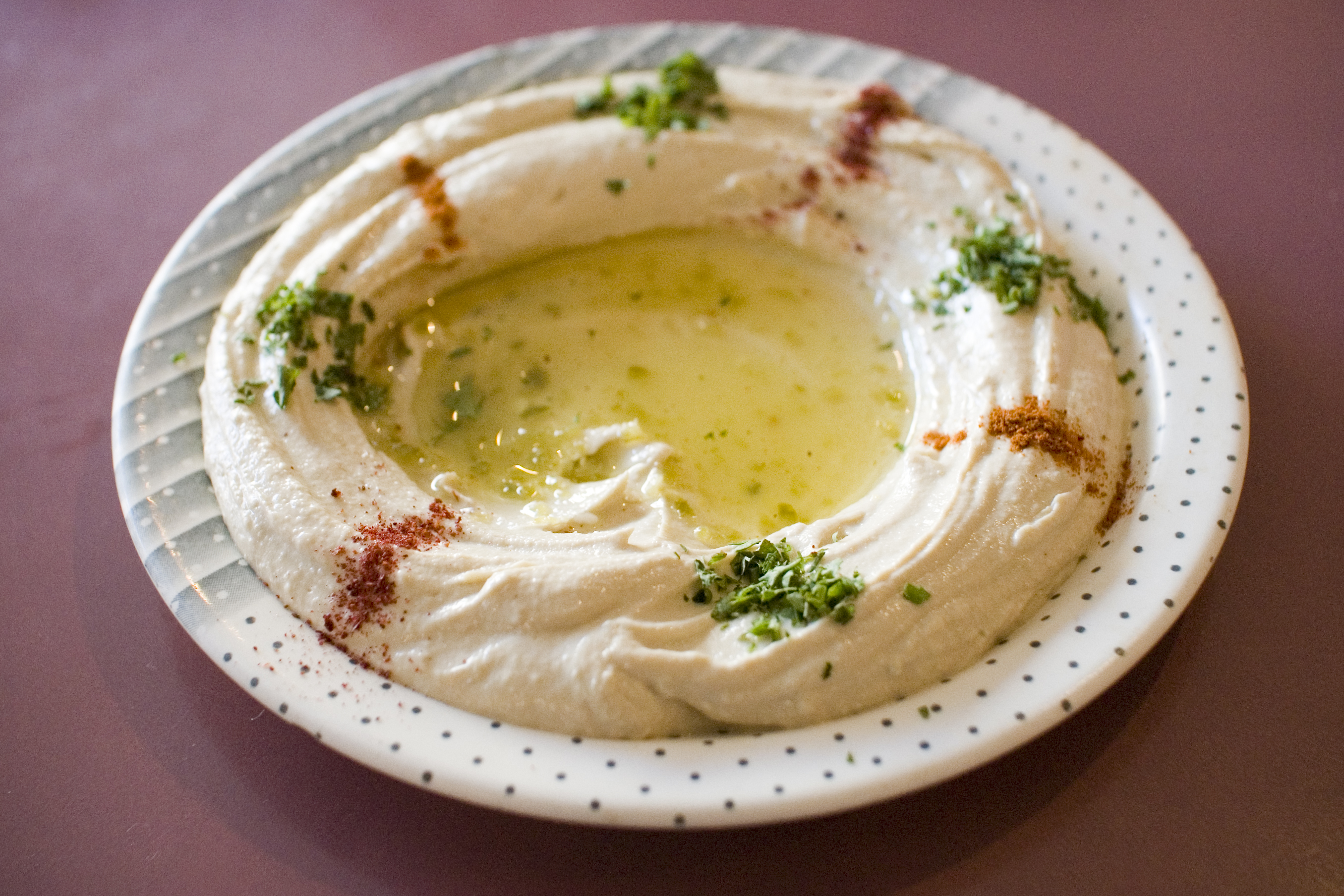
Hummus; A typical popular traditional Levantine meal

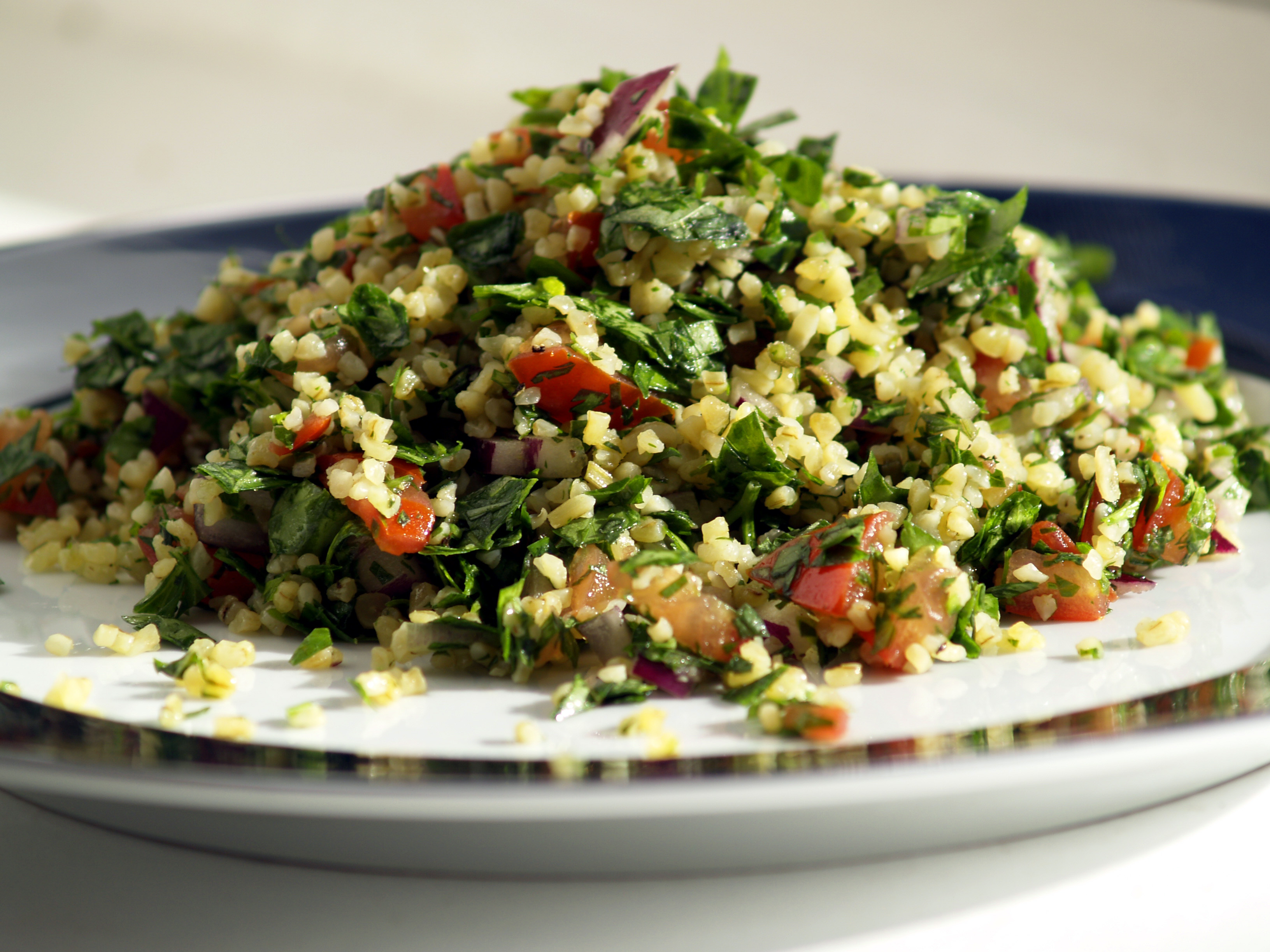
Tabbouleh salad

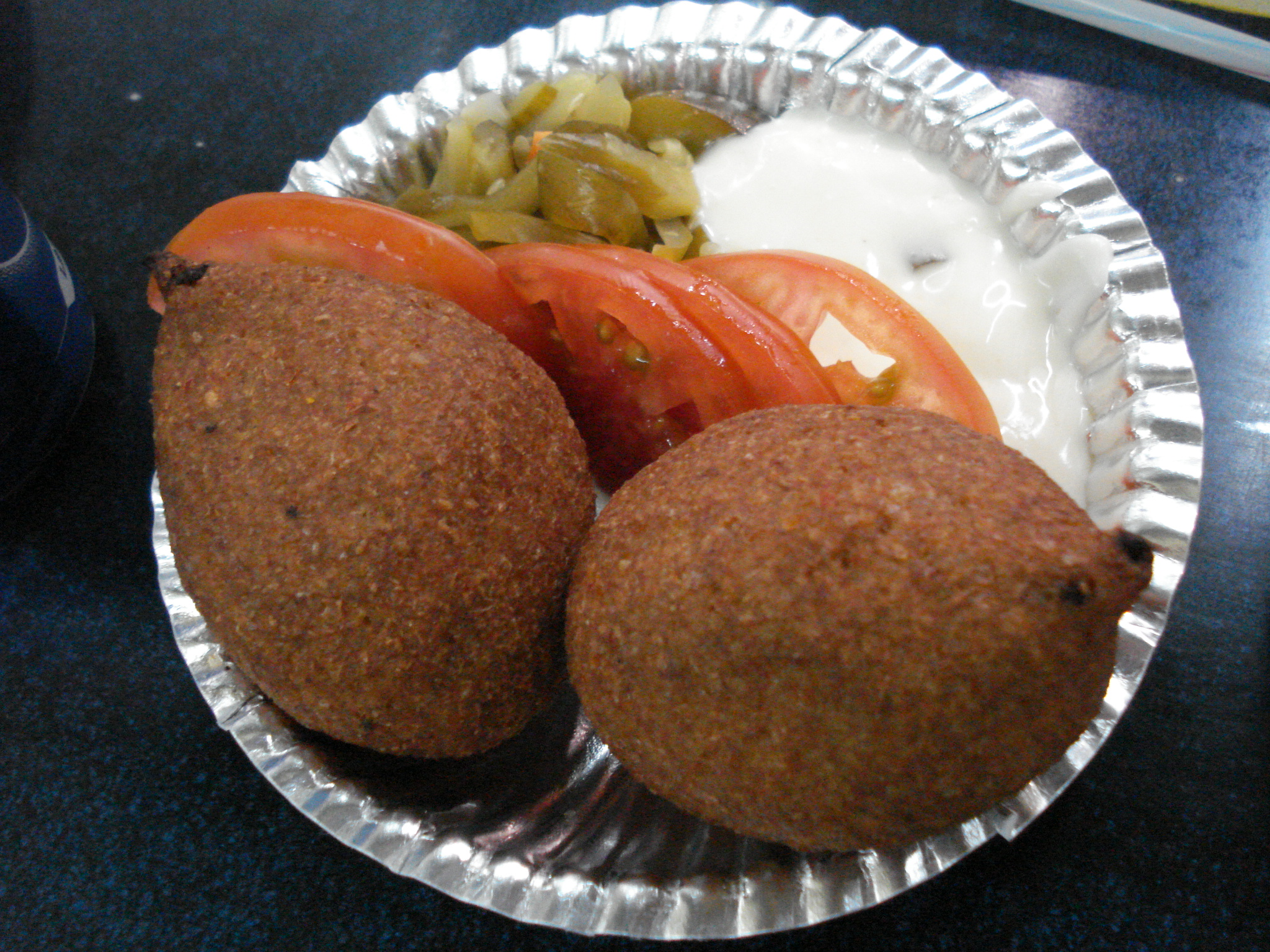
Kibbeh; pounded bulgur wheat with meat filling

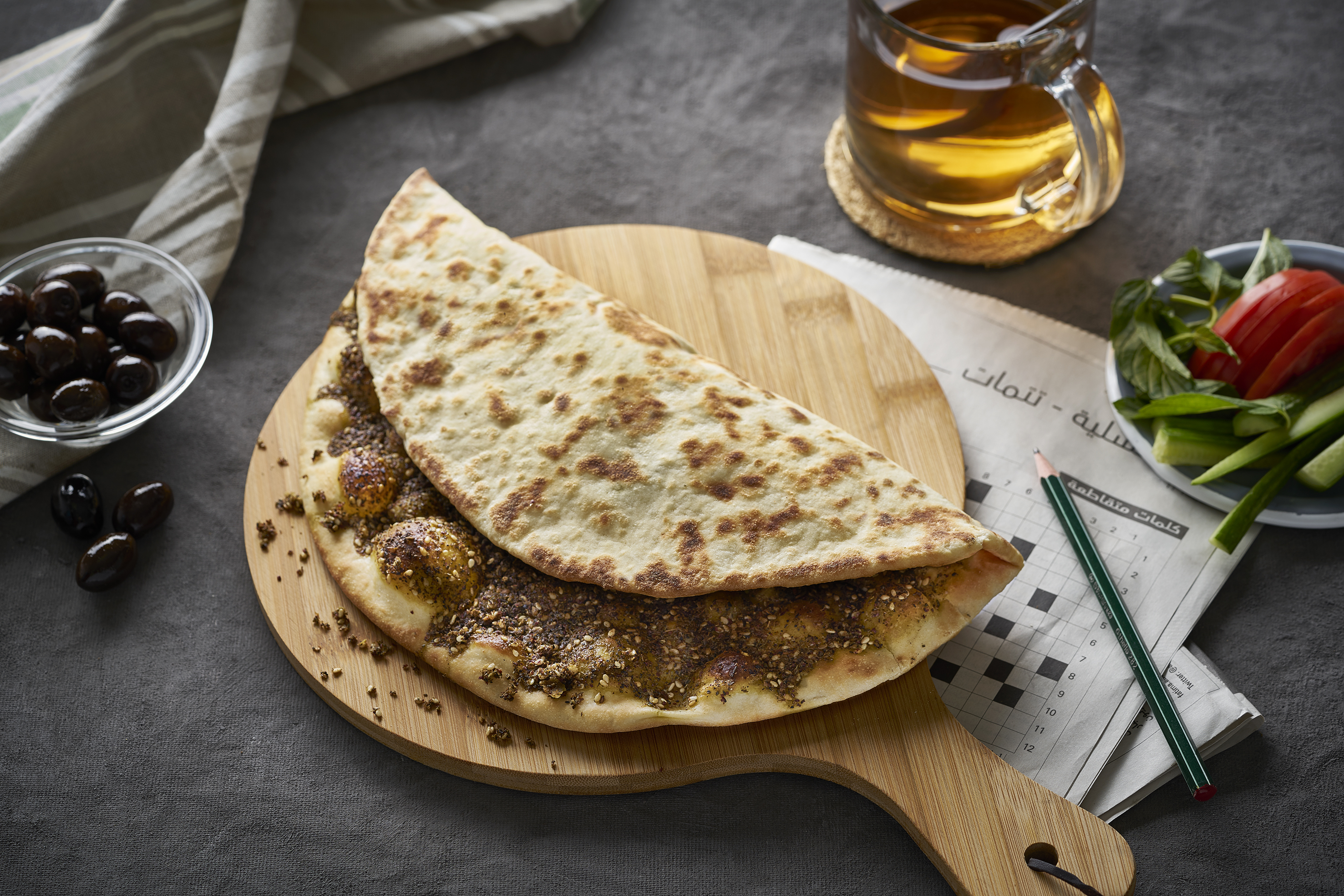
Manakish pies

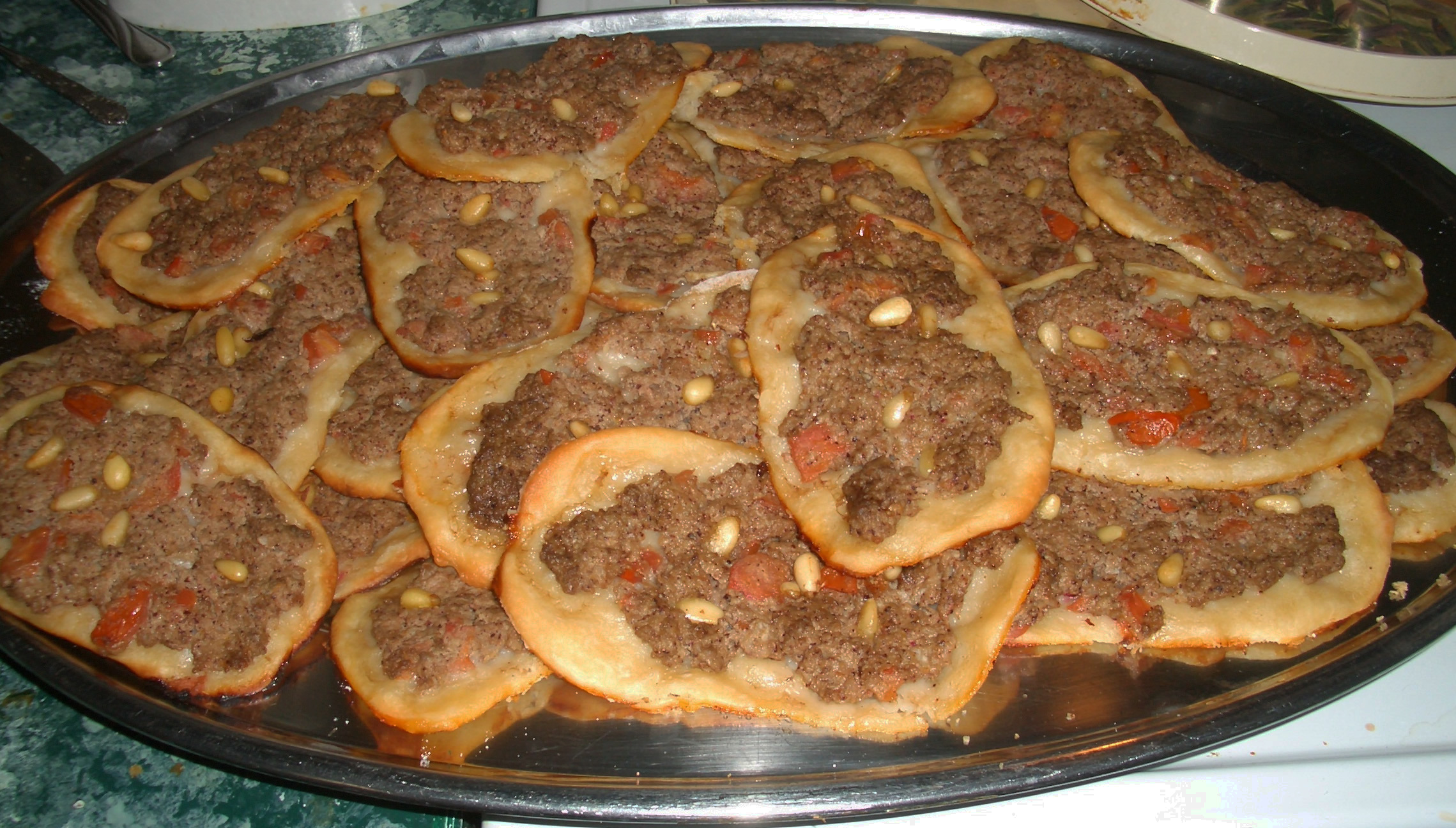
Sfiha, a flatbread with a minced meat topping, often lamb

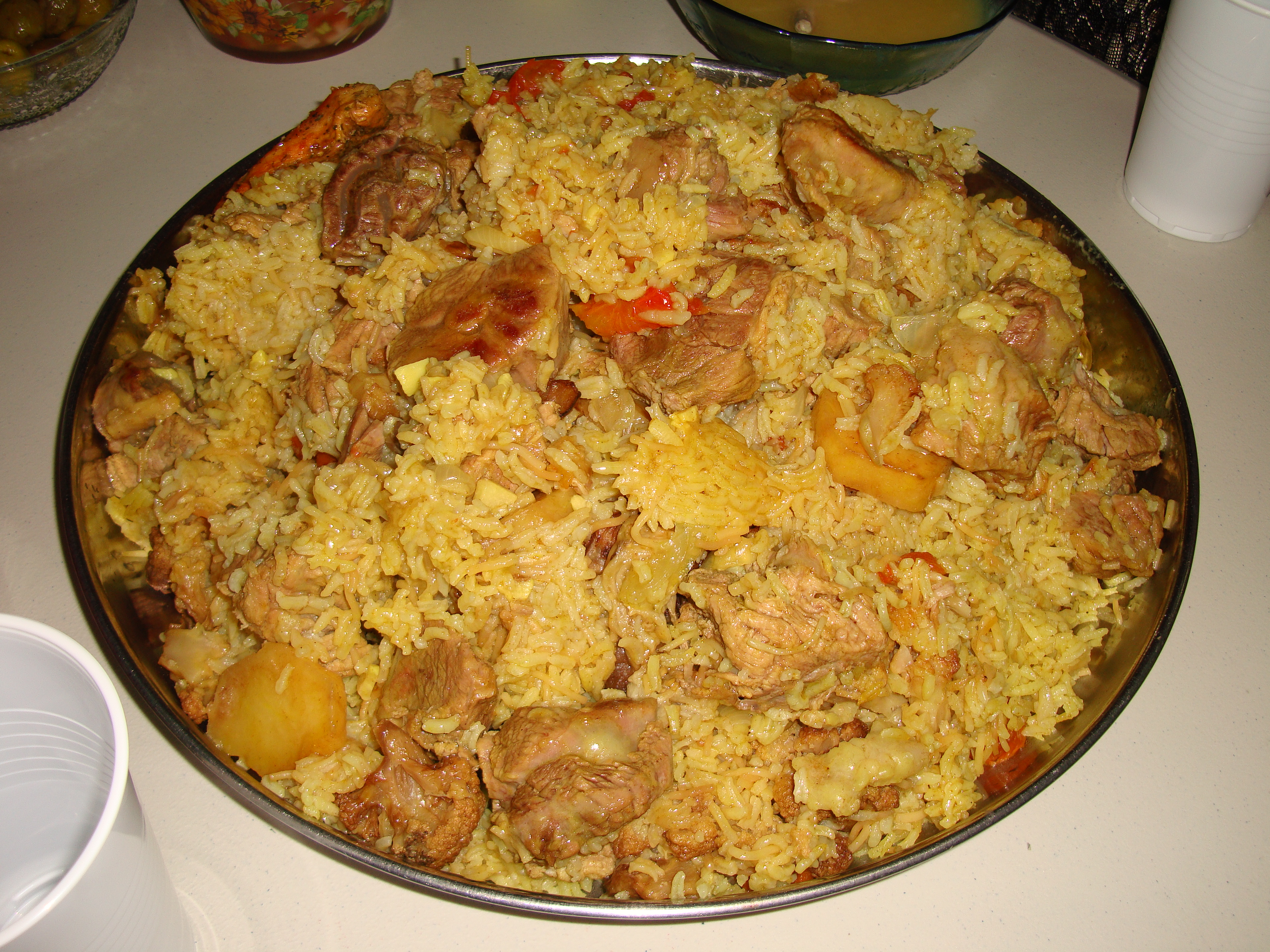
Maqluba, a rice and eggplant or cauliflower casserole, often with lamb

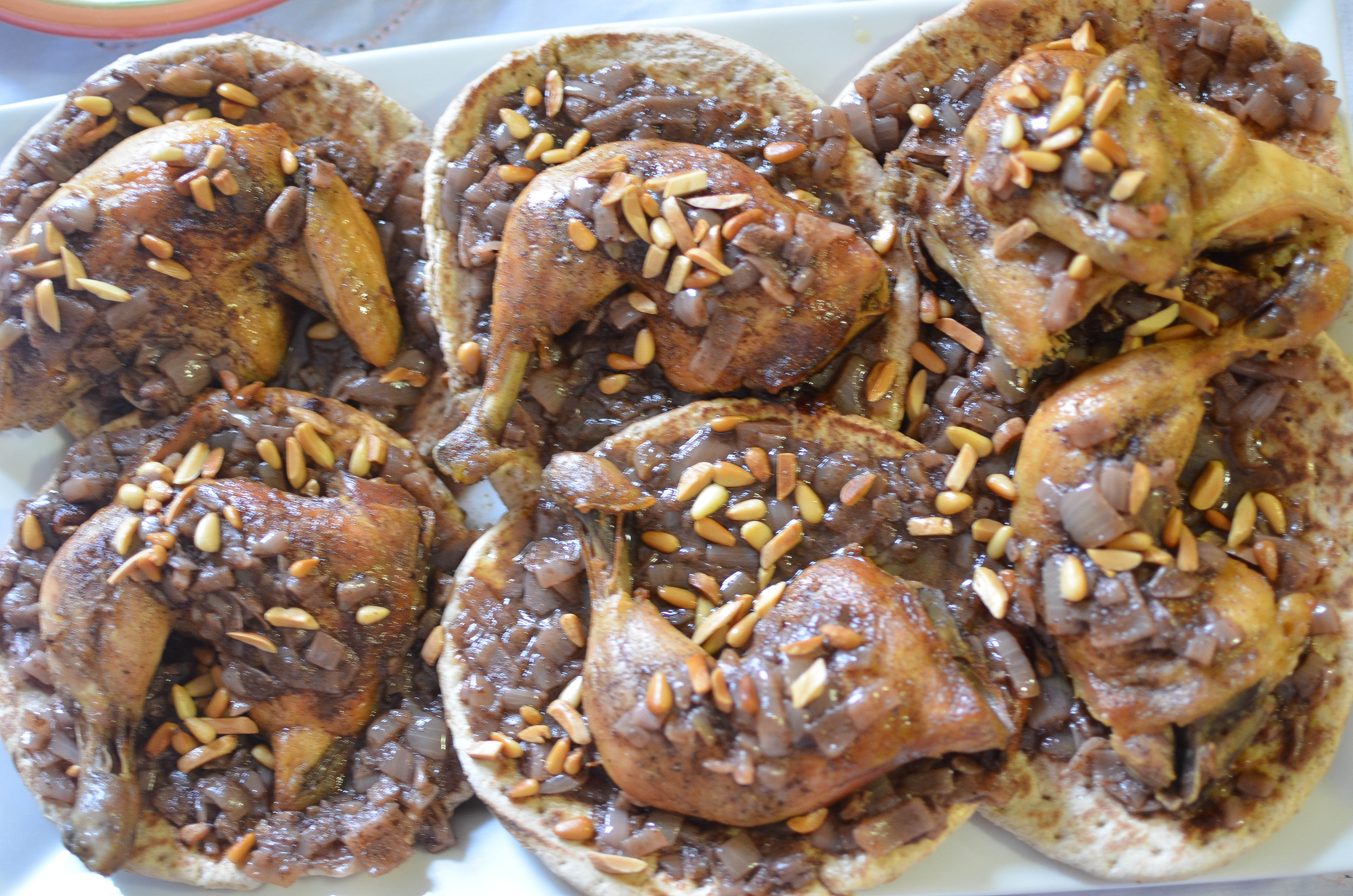
Musakhan, a Palestinian dish—chicken with onions, spices and pine nuts on taboon bread

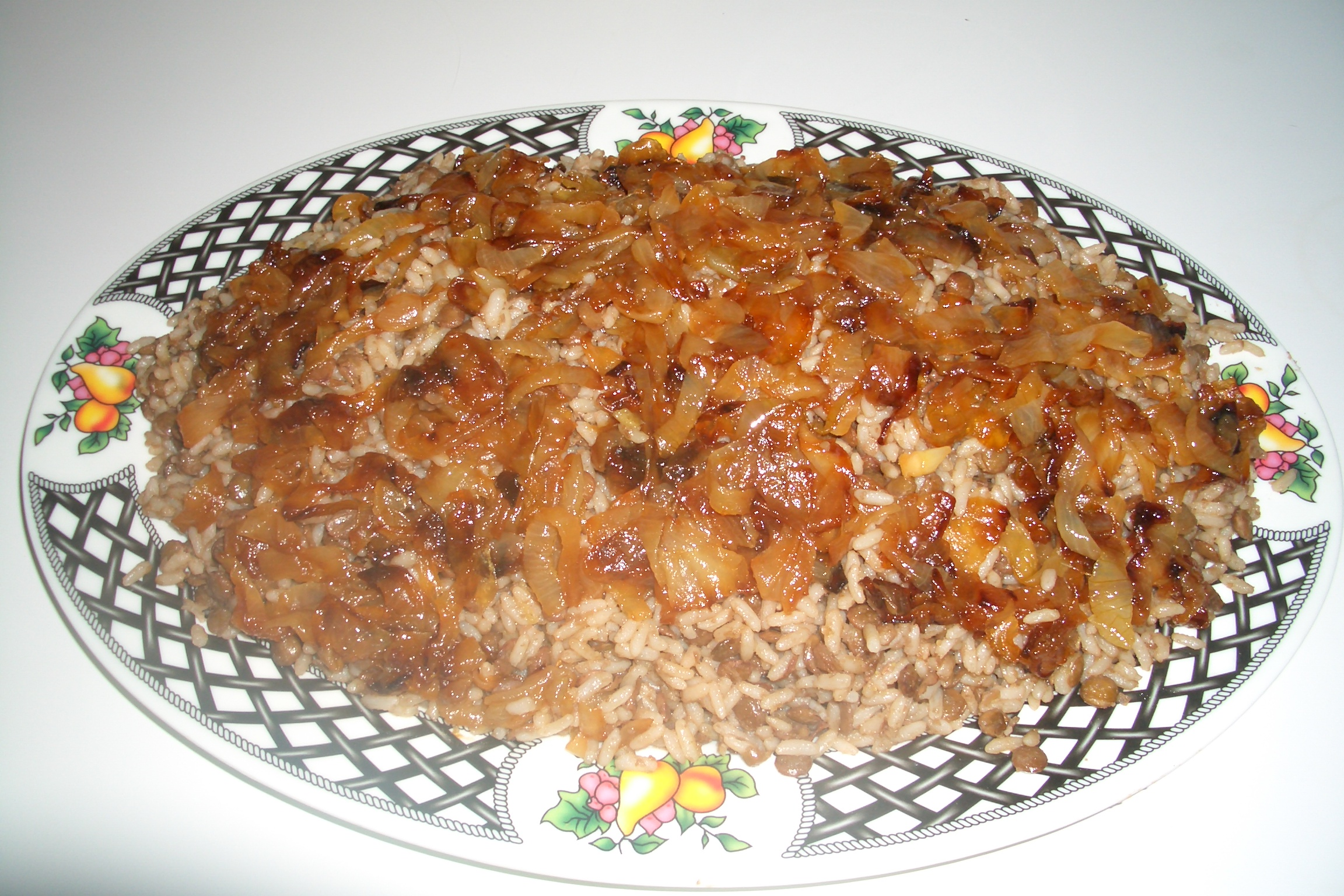
Mujaddara

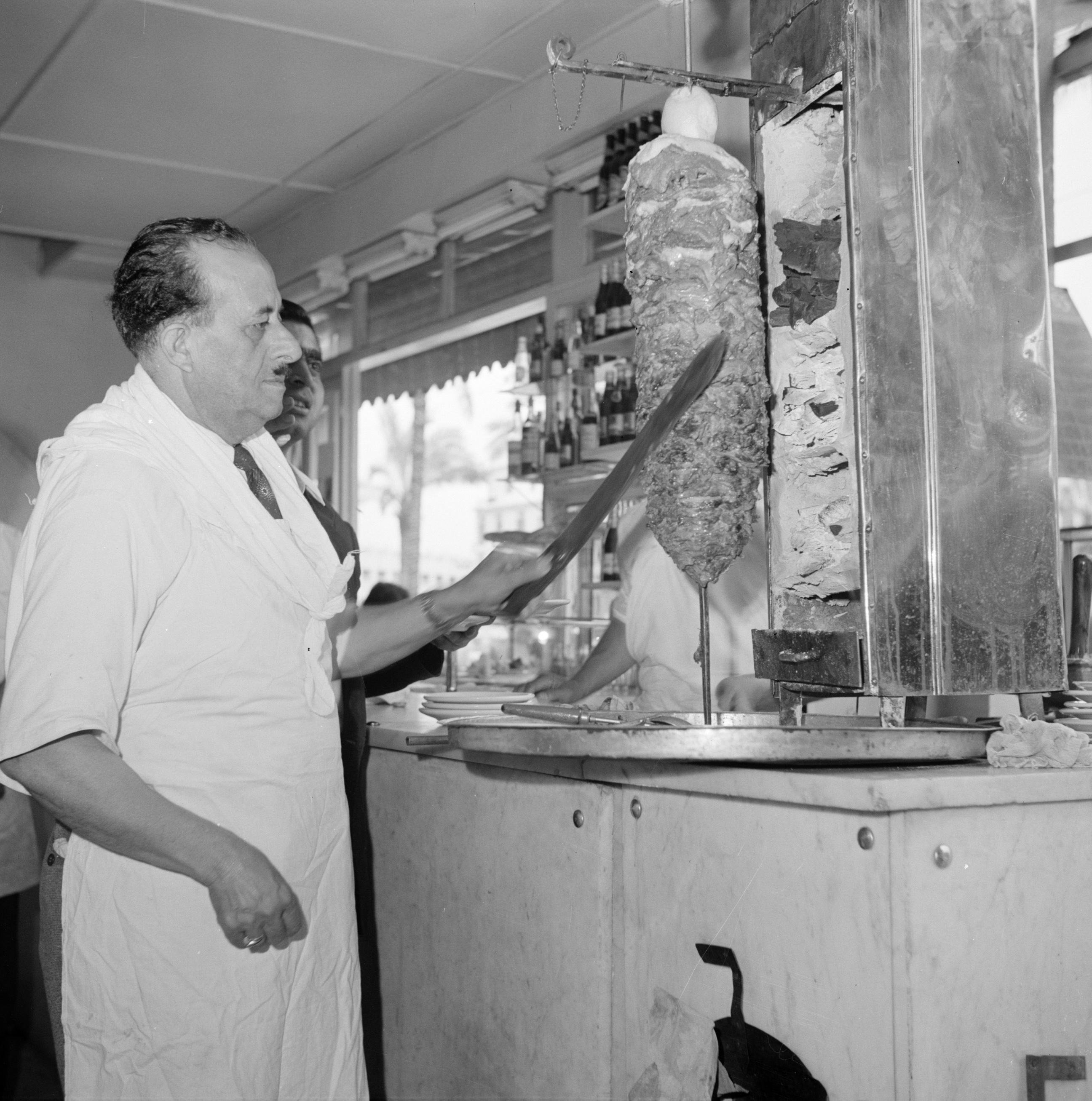
Shawarma in Lebanon, 1950

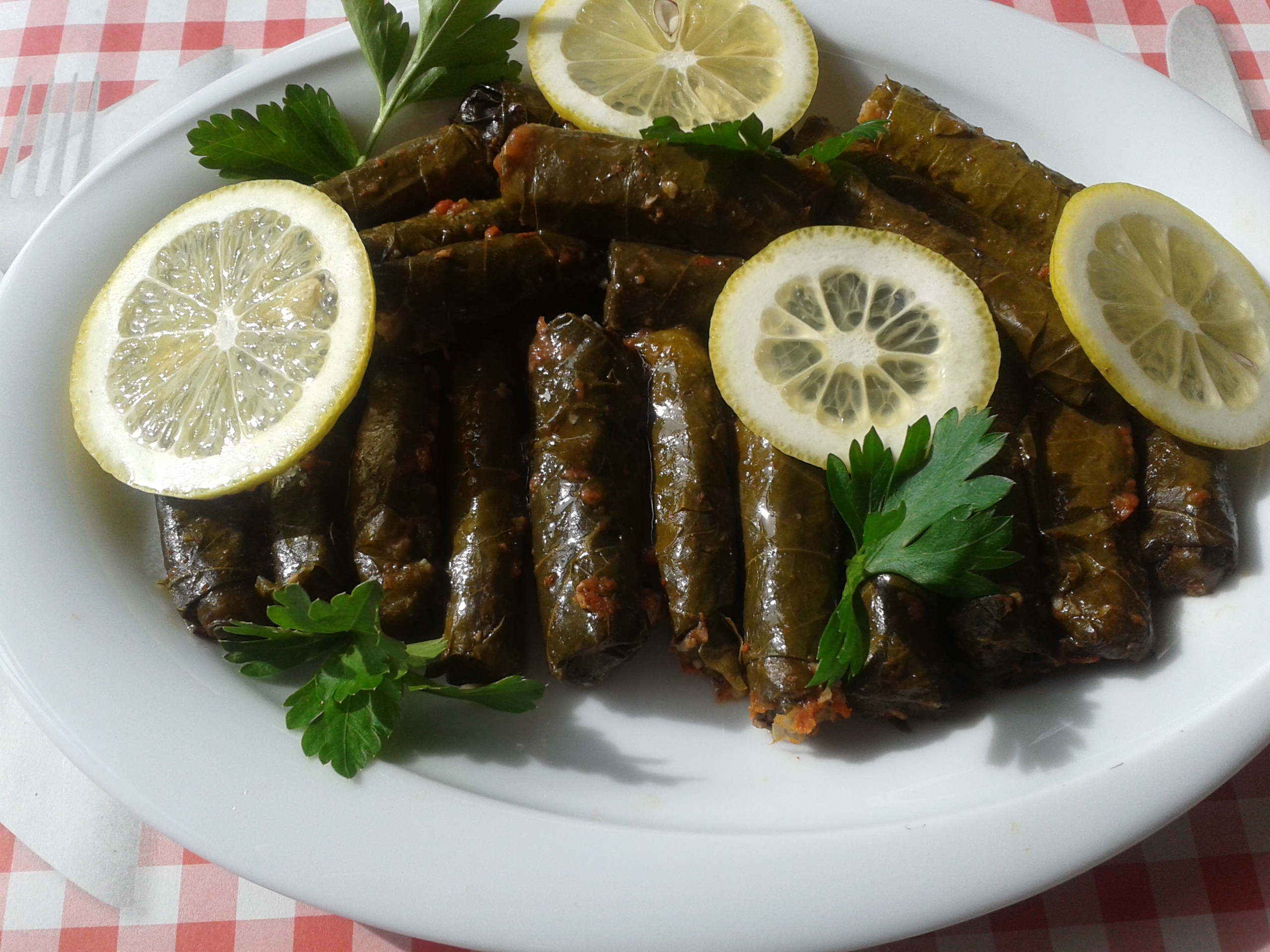
stuffed grape leaves

==== North Levant ====
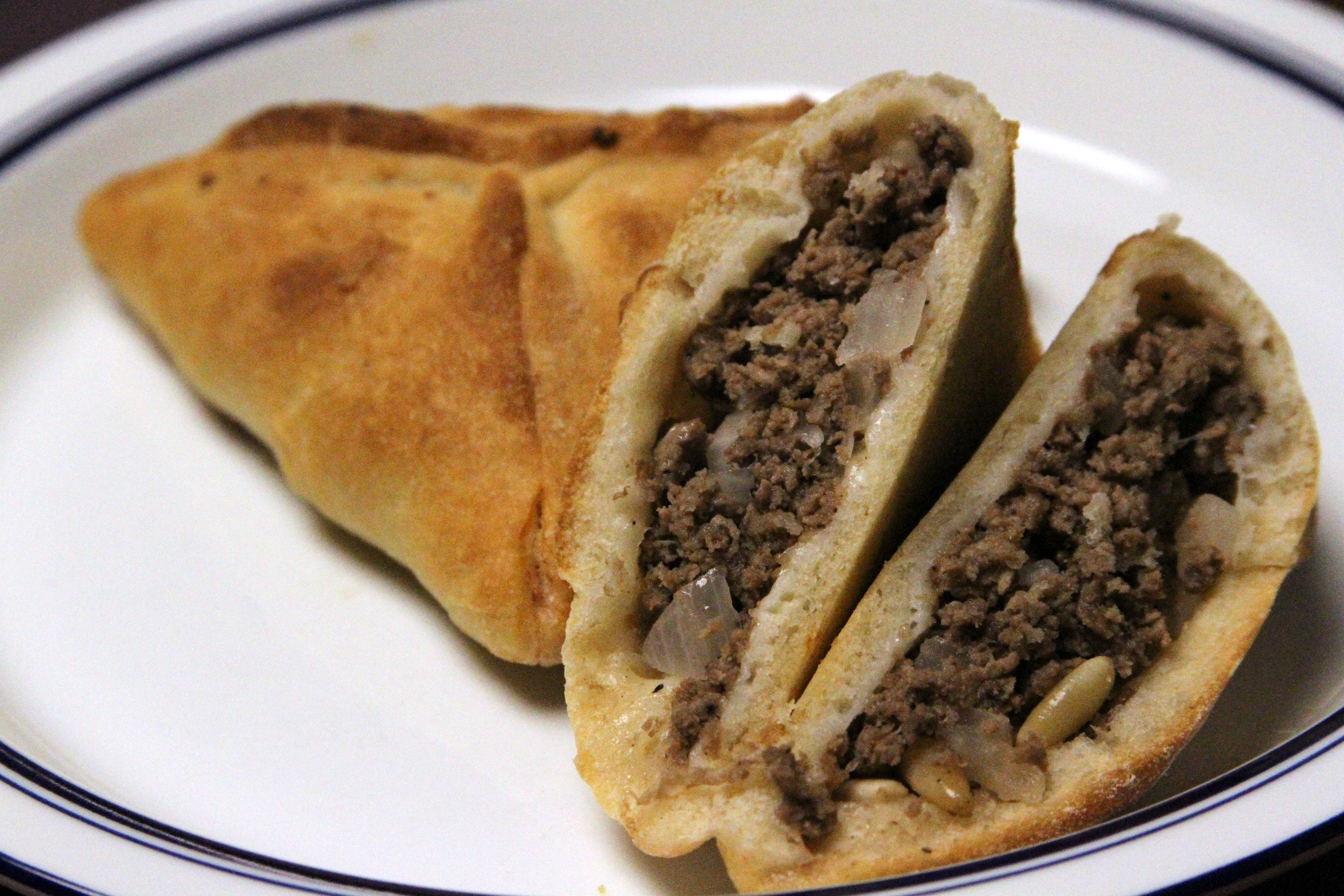
Fatayer stuffed with beef

Some ingredients are viewed as unique to Syrian and Lebanese cuisine, including zucchini, vine leaves, and pistachios, among others. Eggplant, in particular, is considered particularly emblematic of Syrian cuisine.

A quintessential breakfast dish is manakish, consisting of bread (pita or saj) topped with za'atar. It can also be topped with cheese—often akkawi or kashkawan. When topped with ground beef it is called sfiha.

Kibbeh, a dish based on spiced ground meat and bulgur wheat, is famous in Syria and Lebanon. It is considered the national dish of both countries. The city of Aleppo, in Syria, is particularly notable for supposedly having 17 different types of kibbeh, which includes kibbeh with sumac (kibbeh sumaqiyye), kibbeh with quince (kibbeh safarjaliyeh), kibbeh with yogurt (kibbeh labaniye), and raw kibbeh (kibbeh nayyeh). The latter dish is quite popular among Christians and is frequently consumed on Christmas or Easter. It is also very popular in Lebanon.

Another famous dish is shawarma, which consists of meat cut into thin slices which are placed in an inverted cone and cooked using a spit or a grill. Shawarma sandwiches are arguably the most famous example of street food in the Middle East. The traditional shawarma sandwich contains pickles and a garlic sauce, which can either be toum (when the meat used is chicken) or tarator (when beef is used). In Lebanon, French fries are often added.

Kashk is a famous Syrian soup, alongside many soups made of lentils.

==== South Levant ====
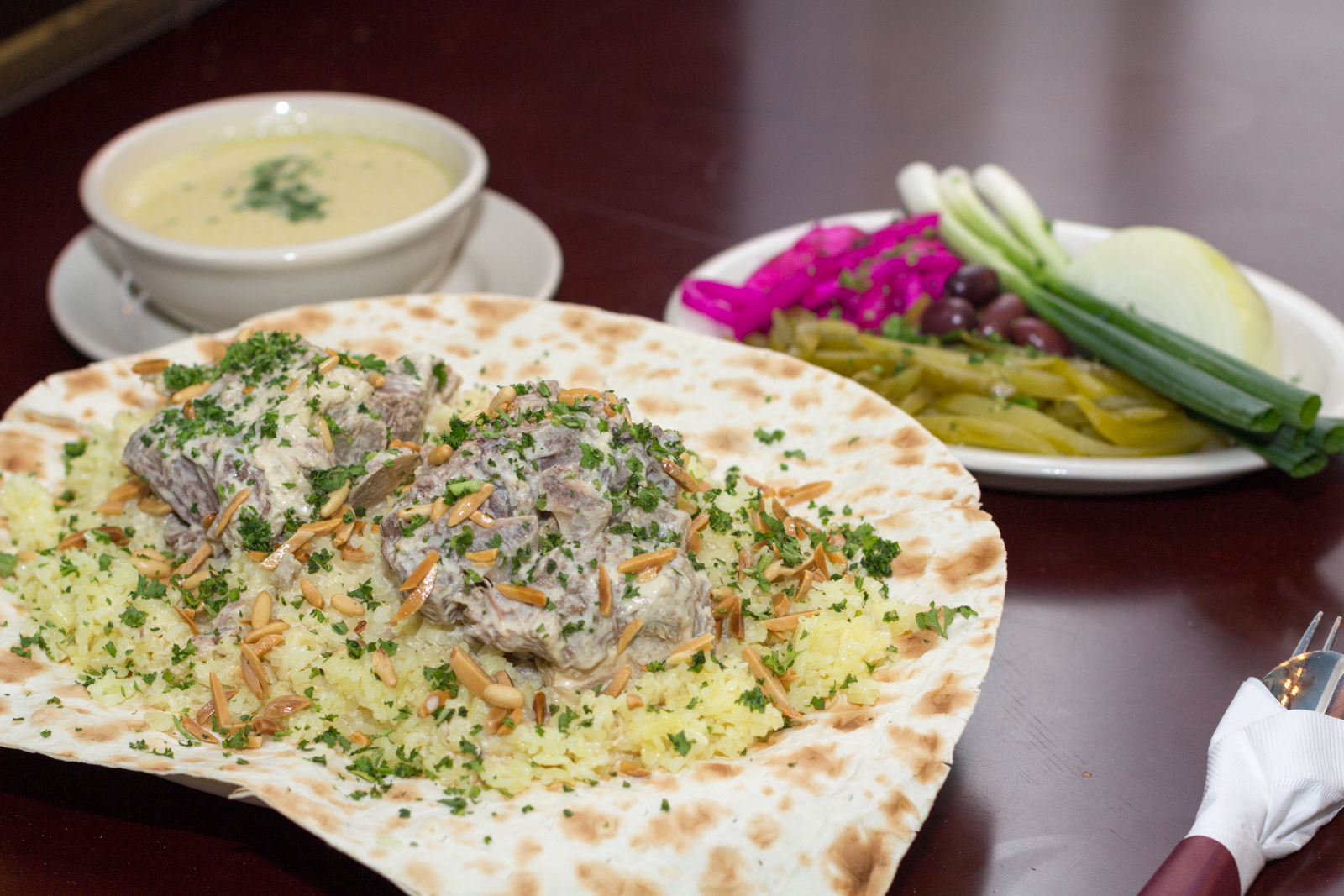
Traditional mansaf served on flatbread

In Jordan and Palestine (and to a lesser extent in southern Syria), there is a much stronger emphasis on roasting various meats, and cooking thick yogurt-like pastes from goat's milk.

Mansaf is a traditional meal, and the national dish of Jordan, having roots in the Bedouin population of the country. It consists of a leg of lamb or large pieces of mutton, on top of a markook bread that has been topped with yellow rice. A type of thick dried yogurt made from goat's milk, called jameed, is poured on top of the lamb and rice to give it its distinct flavor and taste. The dish is garnished with cooked pine nuts and almonds. Mansaf is mostly eaten during large dinner gatherings, and on special occasions such as Ramadan or Eid ul-Fitr.

Another common main dish is musakhan, famous in northern Jordan, the northern West Bank, and Jerusalem. It consists of taboon bread, topped with pieces of cooked sweet onions, sumac, saffron, and allspice. For large dinners, it can be topped by one or two roasted chickens on a single large taboon bread.

Maqluba (lit. 'upside-down') is another popular meal in Jordan and central Palestine. It consists of meat, rice, and fried vegetables placed in a pot which is flipped upside down when served, hence the name.

Mujaddara, another food of the West Bank, as well as in the Levant in general, consists of cooked green lentils, with bulghur sauteed in olive oil.

The primary cheese of the Palestinian mezze is akkawi cheese, which is a semi-hard cheese with a mild, salty taste and sparsely filled with roasted sesame seeds. It is primarily used in knafeh.

The Palestinian city of Nablus is particularly renowned for its knafeh, which consists of mild white cheese (usually akkawi cheese or nabulsi cheese) and a shredded wheat surface, which is covered by sugar syrup. In the Middle East, this variant of knafeh is the most common.

=== Iraq ===
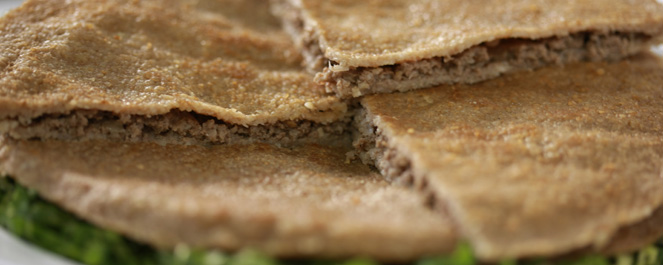
Kibbeh Moselleyh from Mosul

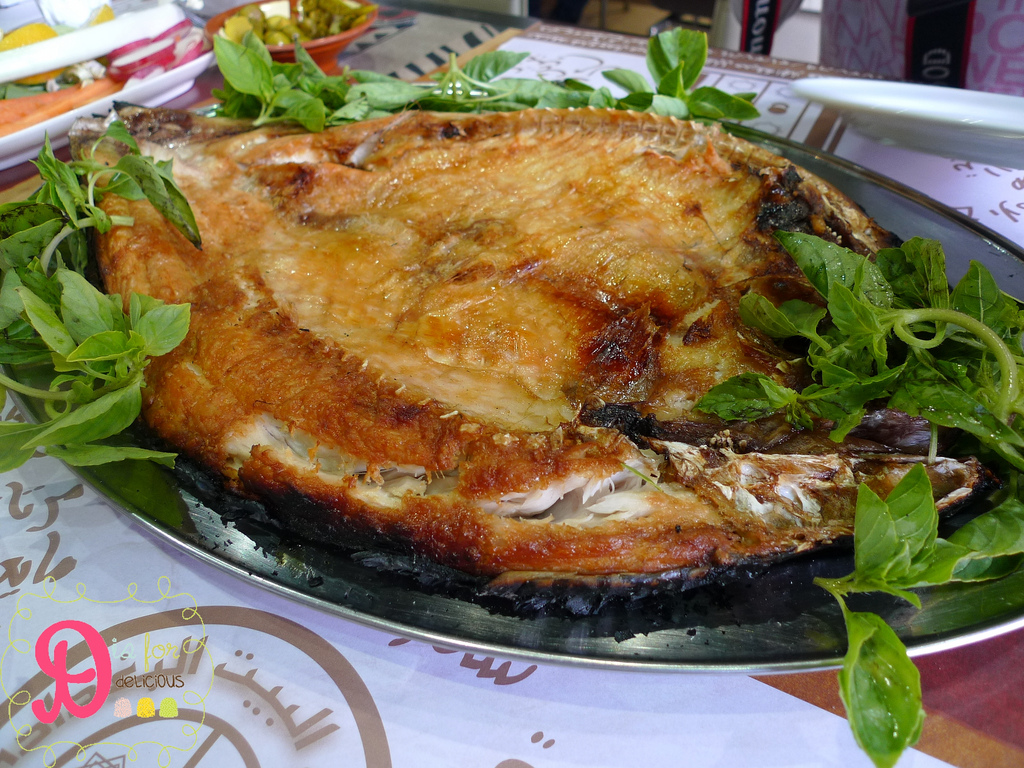
Masgouf fish

Iraq is home to the first cookbook ever recorded in history, historically in Baghdad and Mesopotamia. The Kitab al-tabikh is the oldest surviving Arabic cookbook, written by al-Warraq in the 10th century. It is compiled from the recipes of the 8th and 9th century courts of the Abbasid Caliphate in Baghdad. Due to its location, Iraq shares similarities in cooking and cuisines between both the surrounding regions of the Arab world as well as Turkish and Persian cuisine. Iraqi cuisine mainly consists of meat, rather than appetizers. In Iraqi cuisine, the most common meats are chicken and lamb. The national dish of Iraq is the Masgouf fish, usually eaten with grilled tomatoes and onions.

Iraqi cuisine uses more spices than most Arab cuisines. Iraq's main food crops include wheat, barley, rice, vegetables, and dates. Vegetables include eggplant, okra, potatoes, and tomatoes. Pulses such as chickpeas and lentils are also quite common. Common meats in Iraqi cuisine are lamb and beef; fish and poultry are also used.

Soups and stews are often prepared and served with rice and vegetables. Biryani, although influenced by Indian cuisine, is milder with a different mixture of spices, and a wider variety of vegetables, including potatoes, peas, carrots, and onions. Dolma is also one of the most popular dishes.

The Iraqi cuisine is famous for its kebab, as well as its tikka. A wide variety of spices, pickles, and amba are also extensively used.

=== Egypt ===
Kushari, an Egyptian dish.

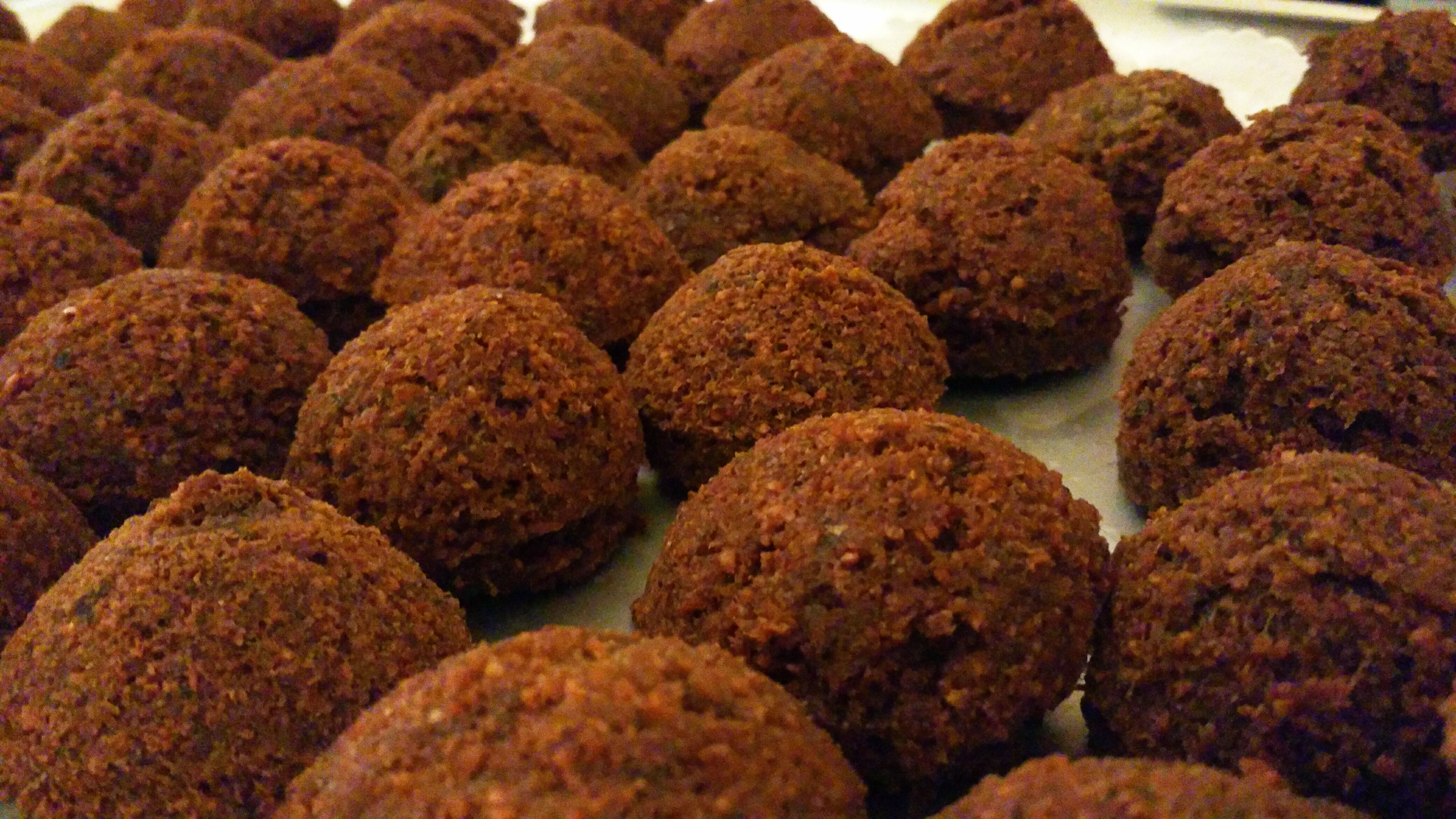
Falafel, deep-fried balls of ground chickpeas or fava beans, is a common dish in Egypt and the Levant.

Egypt has a very rich cuisine with many unique customs. These customs also vary within Egypt itself, for example, in the coastal areas, like the coast of the Mediterranean Sea and Canal, the diet relies heavily on fish. In the more rural areas, reliance on farm products is much heavier. Duck, geese, chicken, and river fish are the main animal protein sources. While Egyptians eat a lot of meat, Egyptian cuisine is rich in vegetarian dishes; three national dishes of Egypt; ful medames, ta'miya (also known in other countries as falafel), and kushari, are generally vegetarian. Fruits are also greatly appreciated in Egypt: mangos, grapes, bananas, apples, sycamore, guavas, and peaches are very popular, especially because they are all domestically produced and are available at relatively low prices. A famous dessert from Egypt is called om ali, which is similar to a bread and butter pudding made traditionally with puff pastry, milk and nuts. It is served all across the Middle East and is also made on special occasions such as Eid. Bread is a staple in Egypt; the most common breads are eish baladi.

=== Sudan ===
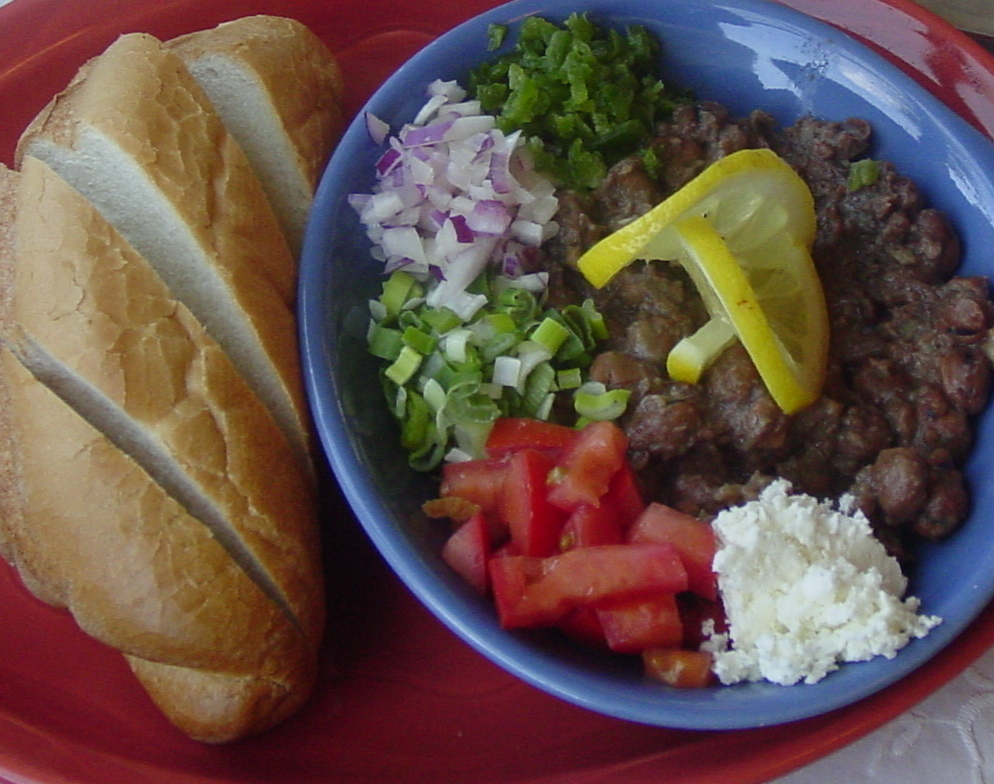
Shahan ful presented alongside olive oil, berbere, various vegetables, and a roll of bread

In comparison to its Maghreb and Levantine neighbors, the cuisine of Sudan tends to be generous with spices. Sudanese cuisine has a rich variety in ingredients and creativity. Simple everyday vegetables are used to create stews and omelettes that are healthy yet nutritious, and full of energy and flair. These stews are called mullah. One could have a zucchini mullah, spinach (riglah) mullah, etc. Popular dishes include ful medames, shahan ful, hummus, bamya (a stew made from ground, sun-dried okra), and gurasa (pancake), as well as different types of salads and sweets.

=== Maghreb ===
Maghreb cuisine is the cooking of the Maghreb region, the northwesternmost part of the Arab world along the Mediterranean Sea, consisting of the countries of Algeria, Libya, Morocco, Tunisia, and Mauritania. In Maghrebi cuisine, the most common staple foods are wheat (for khobz bread and couscous), fish, seafood, goat, lamb, beef, dates, almonds, olives and various vegetables and fruits.

Moroccan cuisine has long been considered one of the most diverse in the world. This is because Morocco has interacted extensively with the outside world for centuries. Over the centuries, chefs in Moroccan cuisine in Fes, Meknes, Marrakech, Rabat and Tetouan have been the basis for what is known as Moroccan cuisine today.

Tunisian cuisine is the style of cooking used by the Tunisian people and is part of the Maghreb and Mediterranean cuisine. Assa on mush, spices, olive oil, chili red pepper, kodaid, wheat flour, lamb, garlic, fish and many other vegetables and spices are common. Tunisian cuisine offers what is known as a "solar kitchen" that relies heavily on olive oil, spices, tomatoes, fish species, and meat. Bread is an essential ingredient in Tunisian cuisine, as it accompanies almost all dishes and is usually used by dipping for broth.

Libyan cuisine derives much from the traditions of Maghreb and Mediterranean cuisines. One of the most popular Libyan dishes is bazin, an unleavened bread prepared with barley, water and salt. Bazin is prepared by boiling barley flour in water and then beating it to create a dough using a magraf, which is a unique stick designed for this purpose. Pork consumption is forbidden, in accordance with Sharia, the religious laws of Islam. Tripoli is Libya's capital, and the cuisine is particularly influenced by Italian cuisine. Pasta is common, and many seafood dishes are available. Southern Libyan cuisine is more traditionally Arab and Berber. Common fruits and vegetables include figs, dates, oranges, apricots and olives.

Libyan cooking, like Tunisian, includes hot spices. Typical foods are bazin (Libyan bread), bsisa, couscous, harissa, hassaa, lebrak (filled grape leaves with rice and minced meat), Libyan boureek, Libyan summer salad, marqa or tajine, madrouba, and mbatten. Mbekbka is a unique Libyan soup with pasta or spaghetti—rather than draining off the water, pasta is boiled together with the sauce. It can be made with any type of pasta, and the simplest dish involves frying onions in oil, throwing in the tomato puree, chili powder, turmeric, then adding water and salt and leaving to boil before adding the pasta. Another way involves adding lamb chops, chickpeas and garlic to the sauce before serving hot with a sprinkle of extra virgin olive oil, lemon, fresh chili and optional crusty bread. Other vegetables such as pumpkin, potato and green pepper can be added. Maglouba, shakshouka, sherba, usban, zumita and asida. Desserts and beverages include makroudh, Libyan tea, ghoriba, maakroun, mafruka and mhalbiya.

Algerian cuisine is characterized by a wealth derived from land and sea production, a Mediterranean-Maghreb cuisine. It offers a variety of dishes depending on the region and season, which gives a very varied plate. This cuisine is still based on vegetables and cereals that have always been produced in abundance in the country, which was formerly called Roma bakery and then Bakery Europe. In addition, Algeria's rich history has contributed to the abundance of food from different periods and regions of the world. Among all the culinary specialties available in Algeria, couscous remains the most famous, recognized as a national dish, as well as the traditional pastry called Oriental pastry in Western countries. Despite its historical transmission from generation to generation, there are many books devoted to Algerian cuisine. Algerian cuisine combines a variety of ingredients including vegetables, fruits, spices, meat, fish, seafood, vegetables and dried fruits. Vegetables are often used for salads, soups, casserole, couscous and sauces. Carrots, pumpkins, potatoes, green beans, beans, kale, eggplant, and truffles are widely used.

Maghrebi dishes

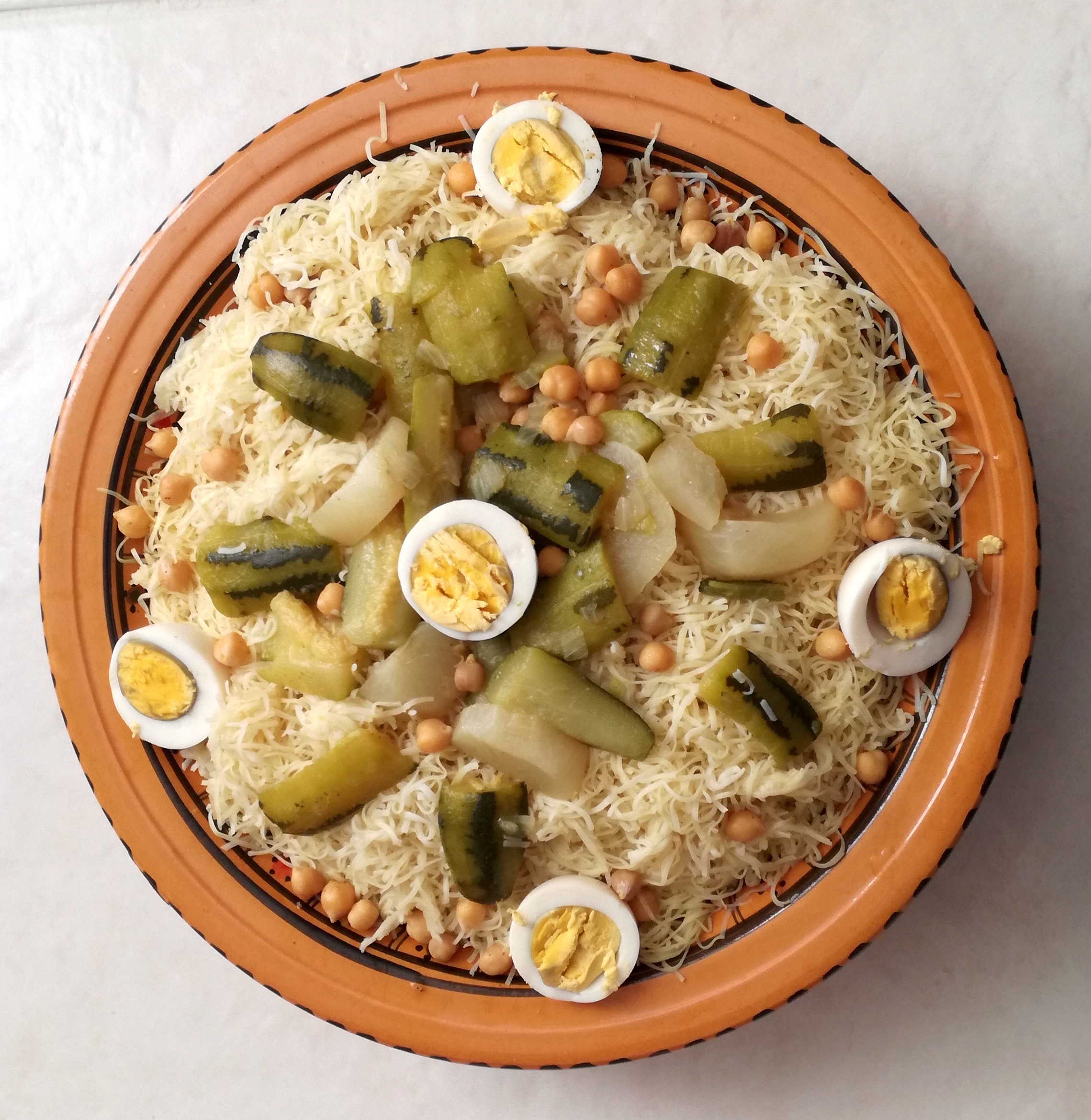
Rechta is a Maghrebi dish of fine noodles, consumed particularly in Algeria and Libya and to a lesser extent in Tunisia and Morocco.

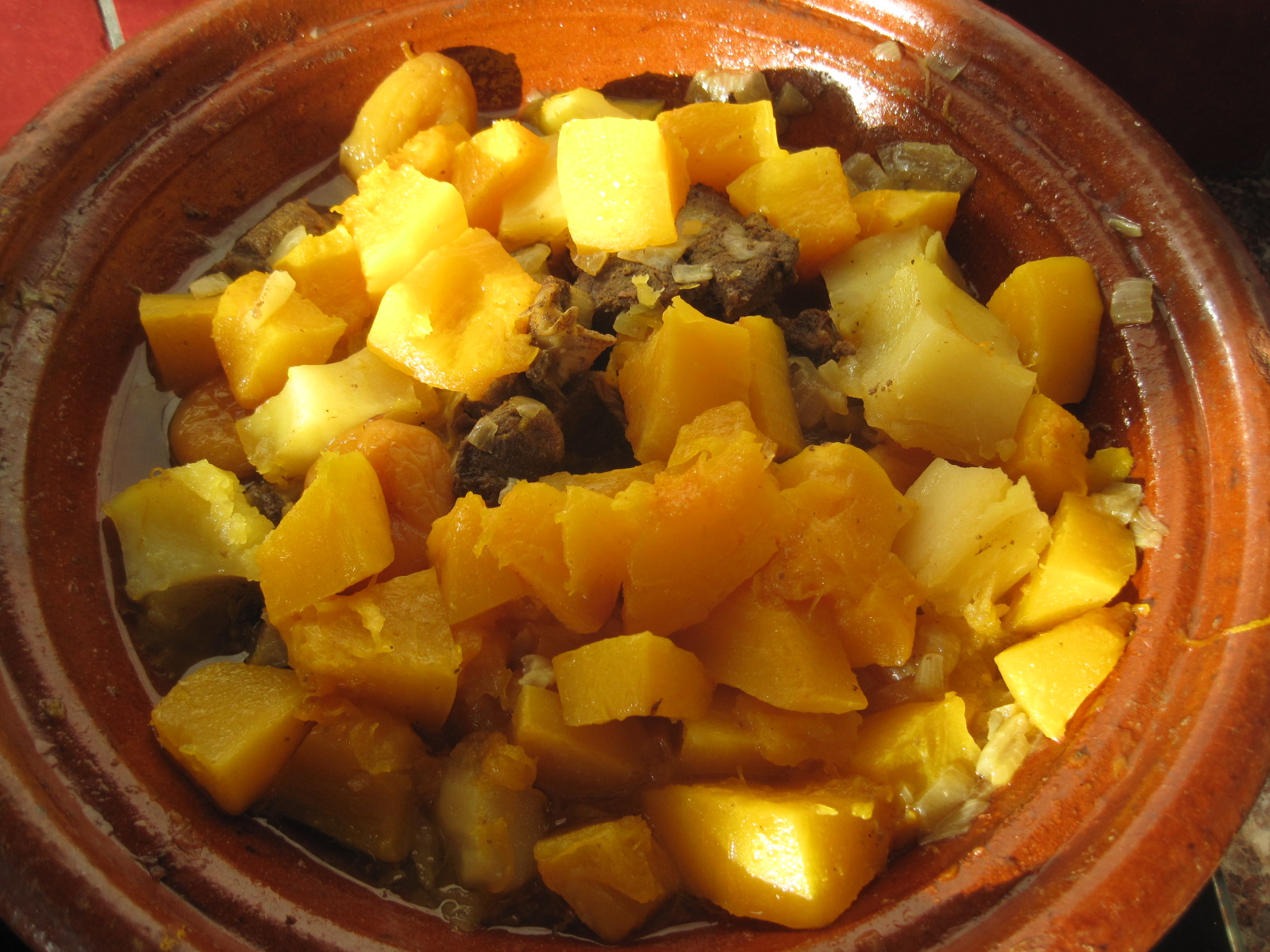
Tajine with lamb and mango. Tajine is a Maghrebi dish which is named after the earthenware pot in which it is cooked. It is also called maraq or marqa.

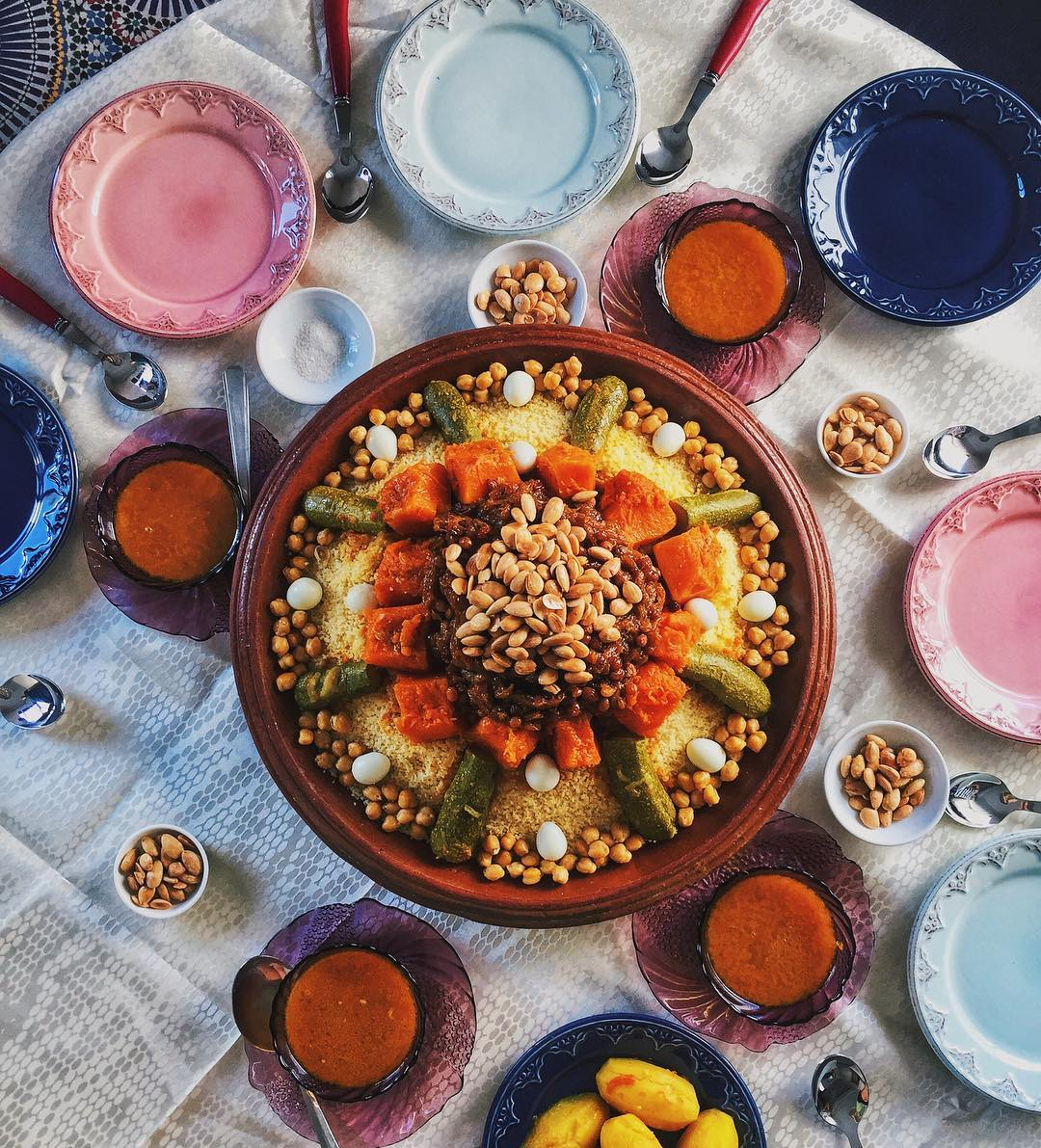
Couscous, a characteristic dish of the Maghreb, is made of steamed balls of crushed durum wheat semolina about 3 millimetres (0.12 in) across traditionally served with stew spooned on top.

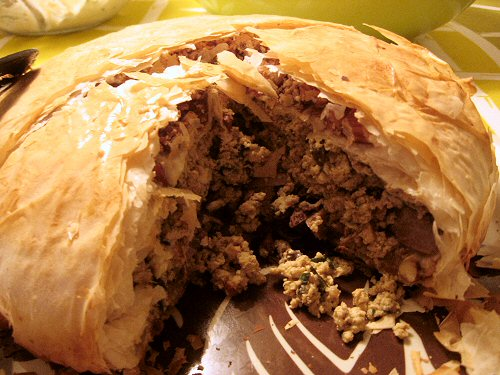
Bastilla, Moroccan meat pie

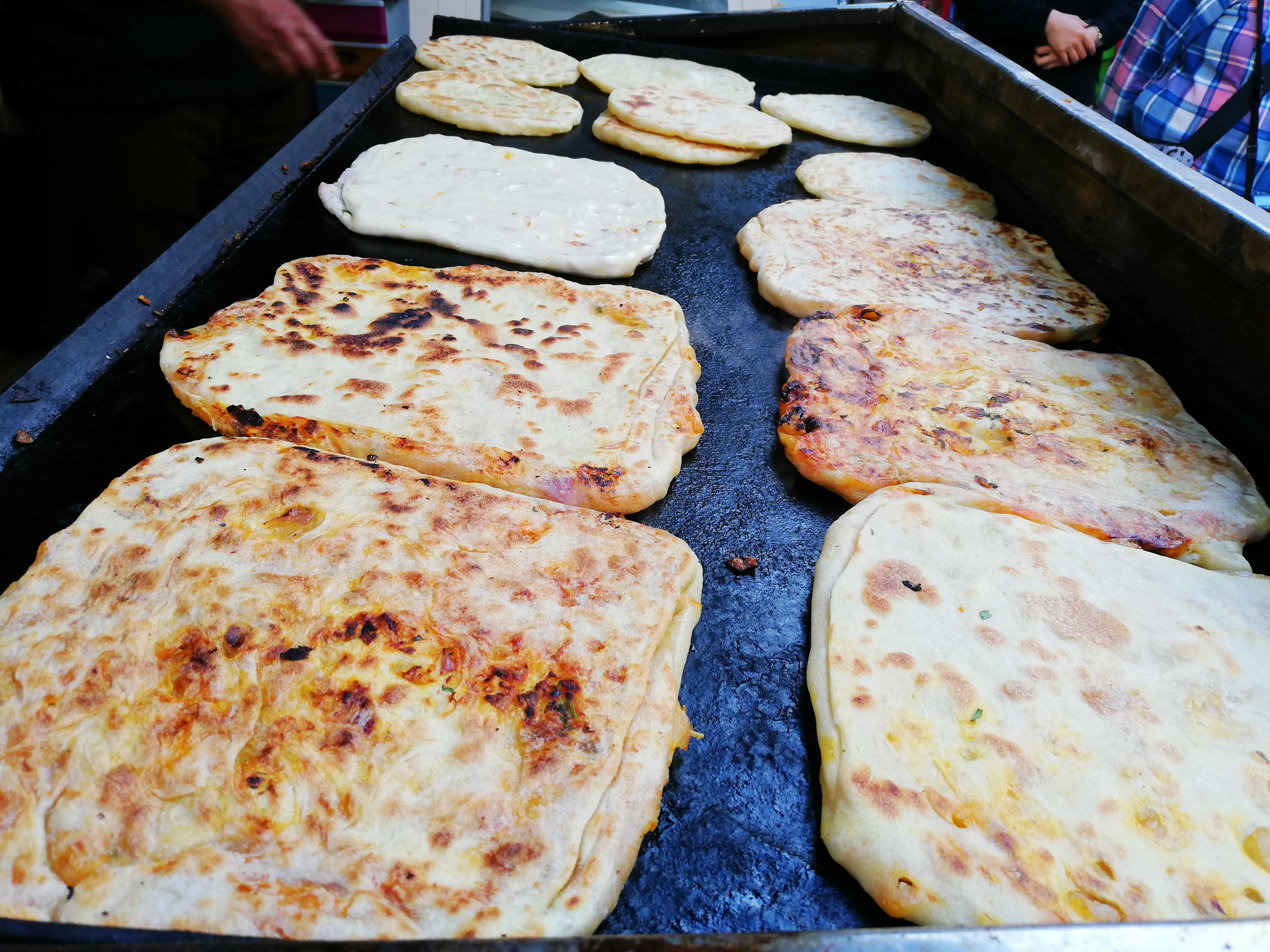
Msemmen, usually served with honey, mint tea or coffee, can also be stuffed with meat

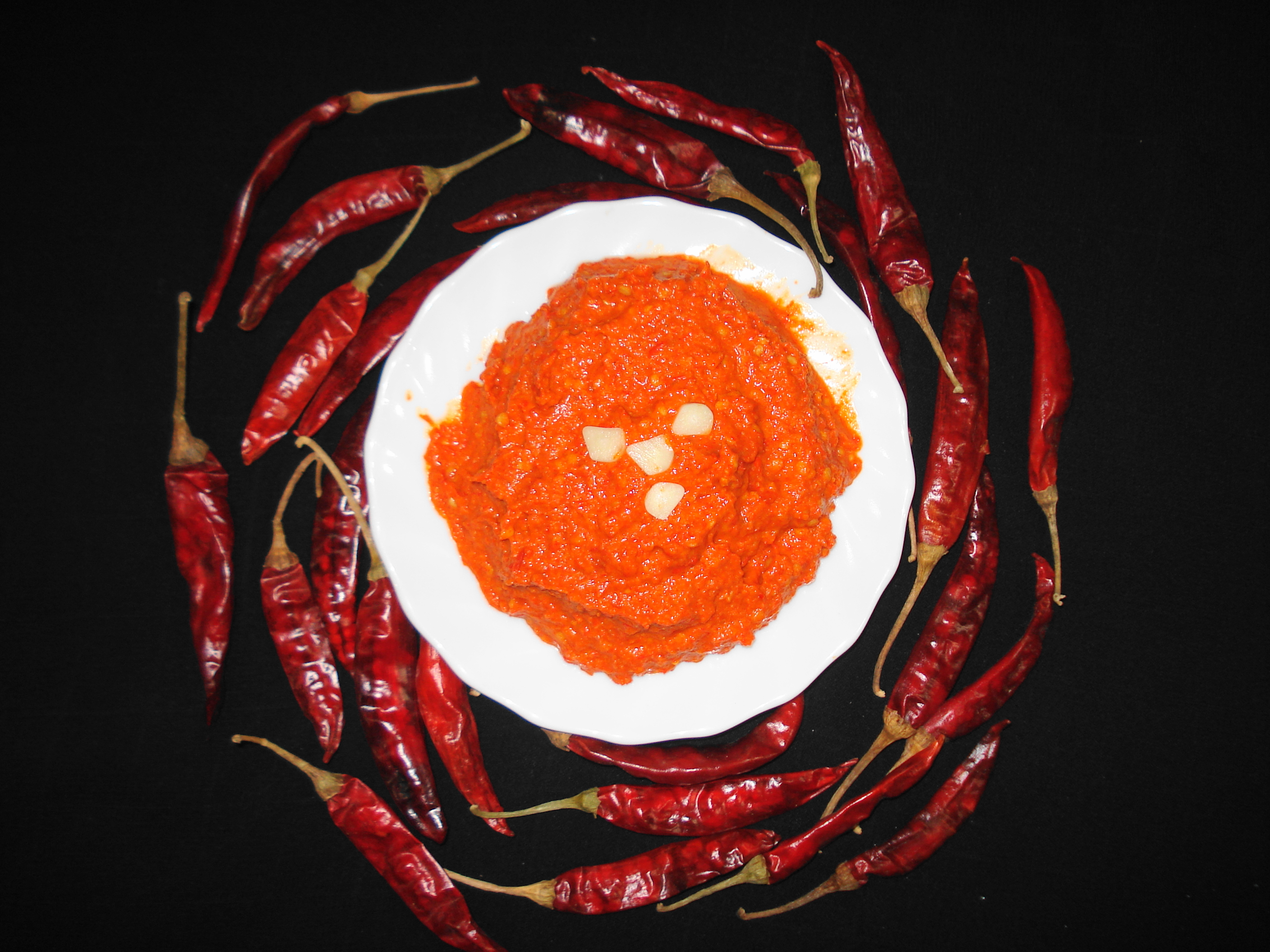
Harissa; spicy sauce

== Gallery ==
Other dishes

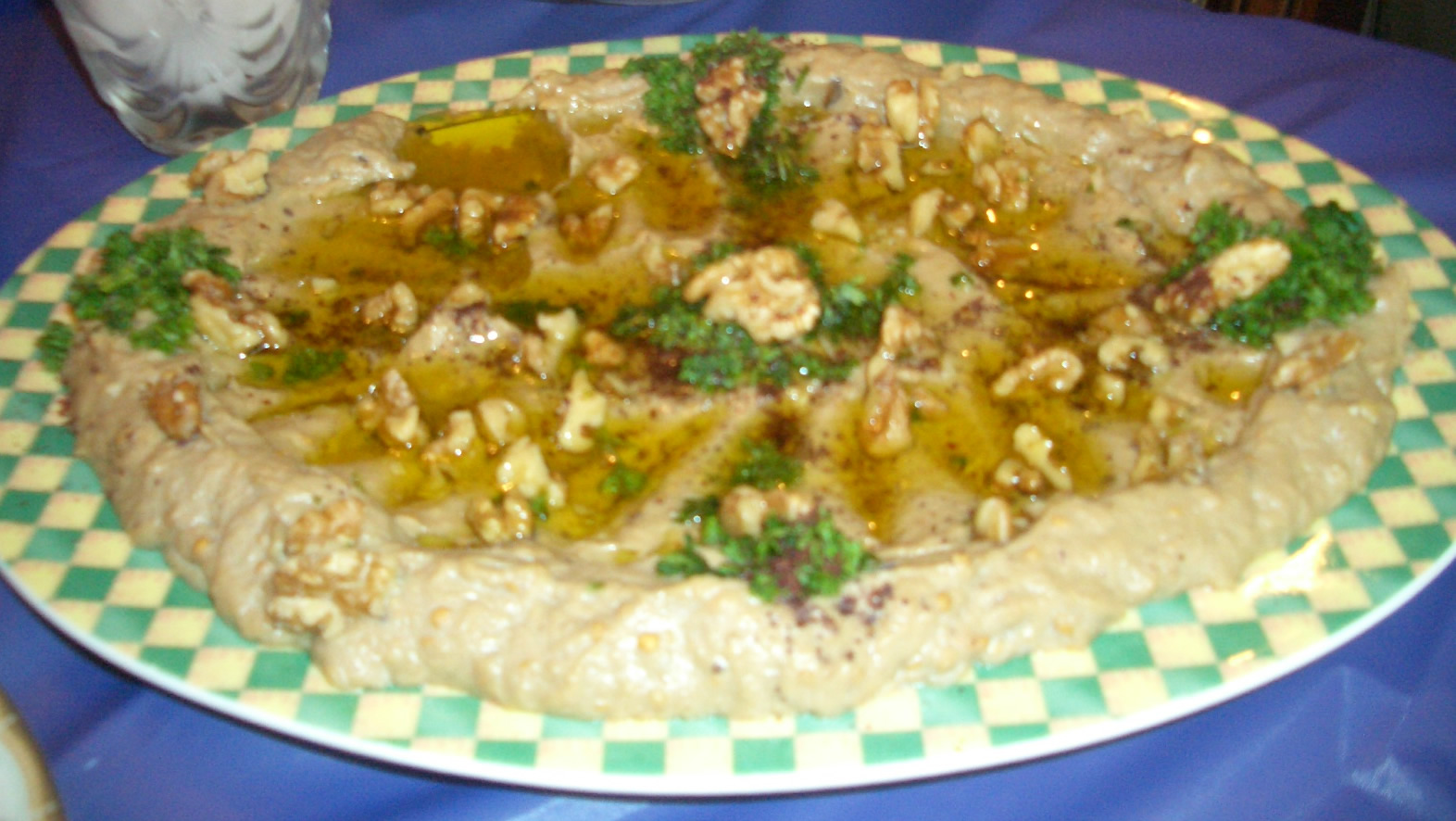
Baba ghanoush بابا غانوج

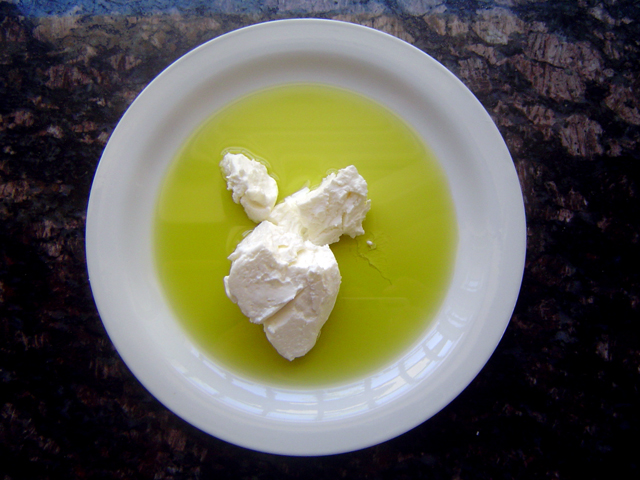
Labneh لبنة

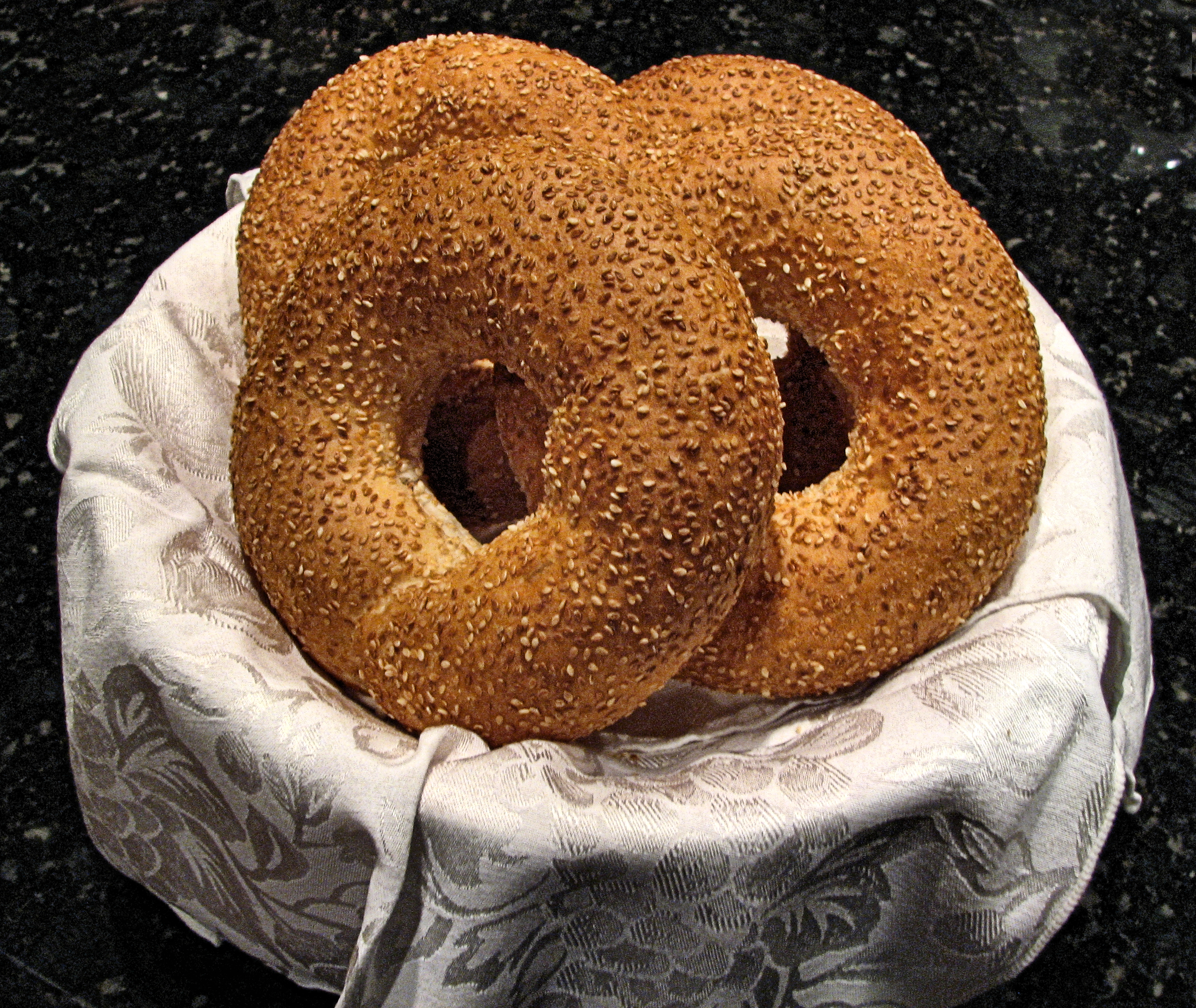
Ka'ak كعك - كحك

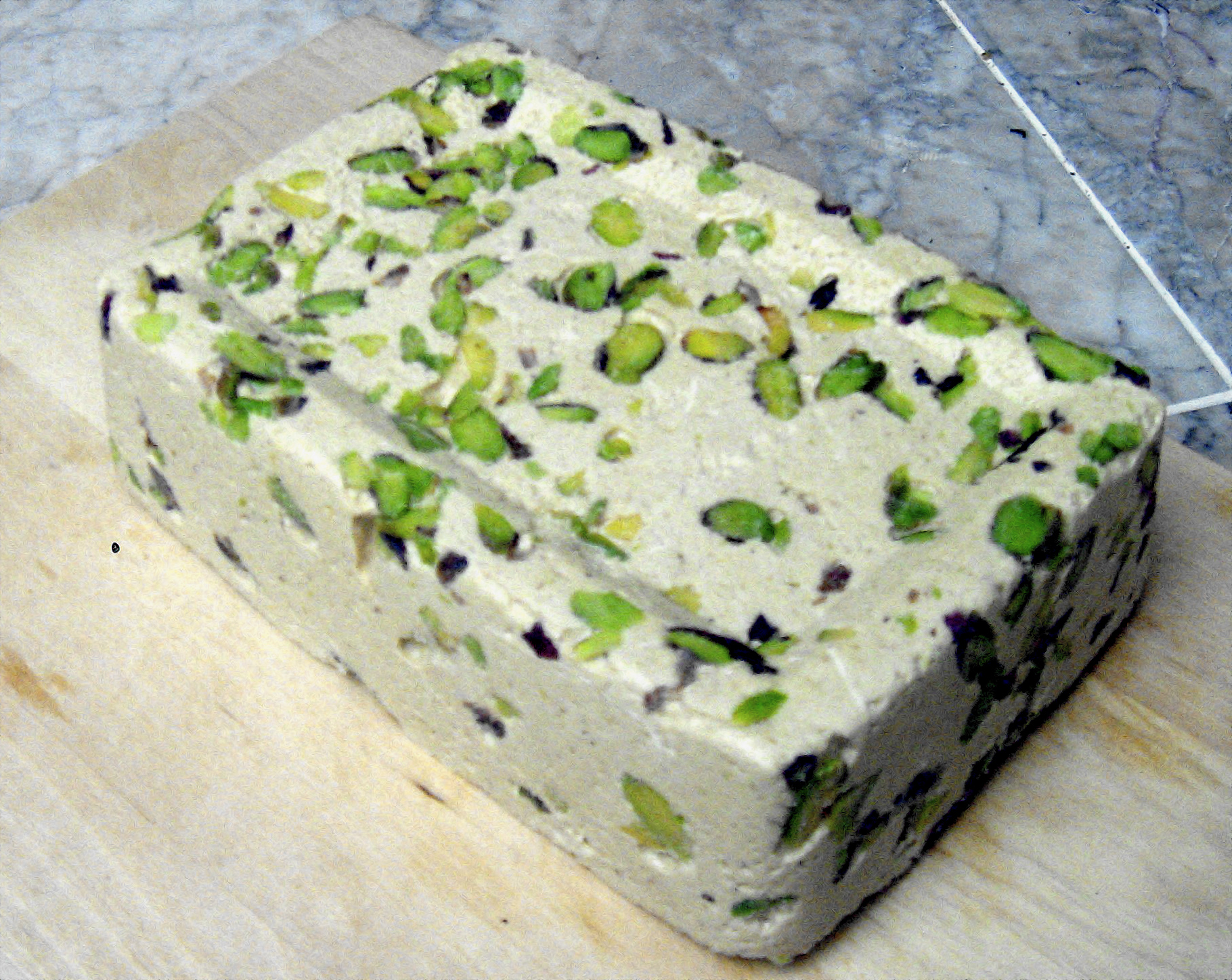
Halva حلاوة

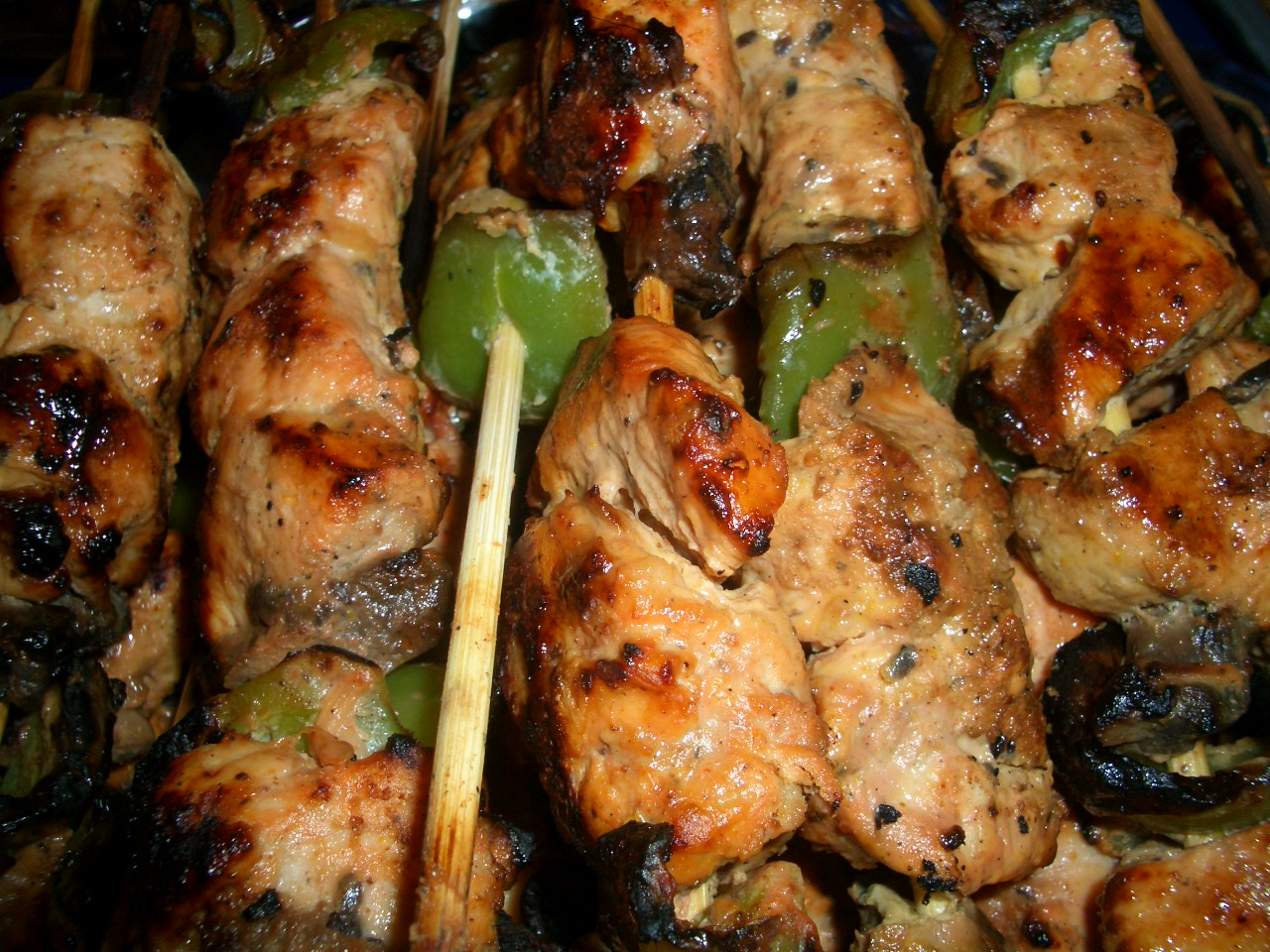
Shish taouk شيش طاوك

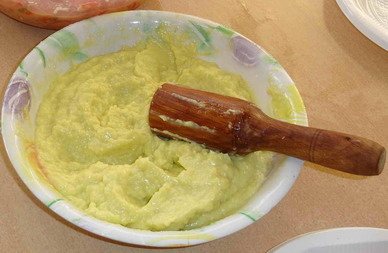
Toum تومية

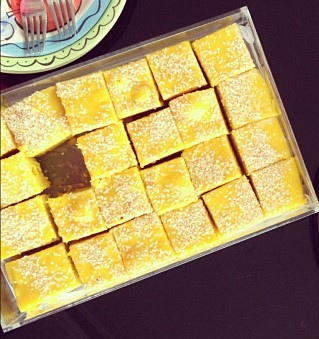
Sfouf صفوف

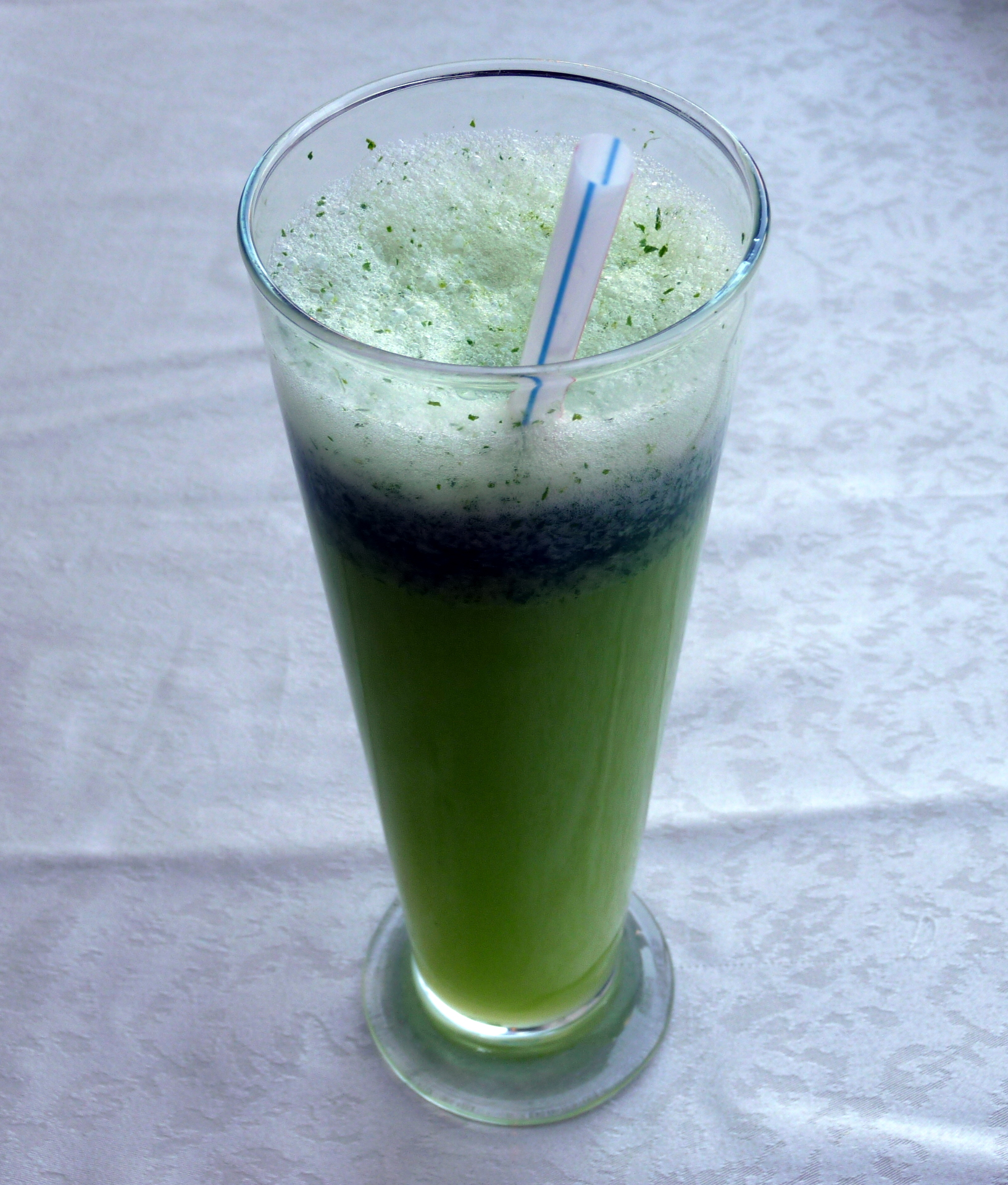
Limonana ليمون نعناع

== See also ==
- List of Arab salads
