= List of Levantine cheeses =

Countries in the Levant share a long history of raising cattle to earn a livelihood. The farmers thought of inventing various types of cheese with the portion of cattle milk that remained on the farm. Along with providing an innovation in the diet of people, in a way that is as equally important, farmers invented more dairy products that could be sold. Cheese is now embedded in the cuisines of the Levant. There are several traditional varieties of cheese most commonly found throughout the region, including ackawi (from Akka), baladi (from baladi goats), jibneh arabieh (from Galilee and Negev Desert), jibneh mshallale (from Syria), nabulsi (from Nablus), and surke (from Akkar and around Tartus).

== Types of cheese ==
Some of the most common types of cheese from the Levant are:

=== Akkawi ===
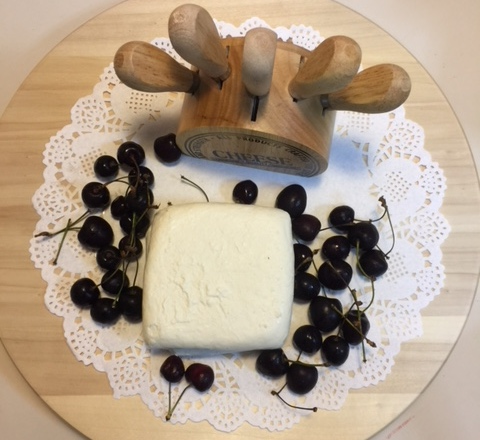
Akkawi cheese served with cherries

Akkawi (also called akawi, akkawi, and akawieh) is a white cheese with a rich and subtle flavor. It is a Levantine cheese originating from what is now Acre, Israel (Akka in Arabic). This cheese is commonly made using pasteurized cow's milk but can be made with goat or sheep's milk. It is produced on a large scale in Israel, Jordan, Syria and Palestine. Akkawi cheese is used in such dishes as Manakish (a flatbread topped with cheese, seeds and oil), Sambusek, Kunafa (a dessert cooked from shredded phyllo dough, stretchy cheese and soaked in cane sugar syrup), Mana'eesh (a Palestinian pastry stuffed with cheese and dried mint) and Fatayer (a Levantine meat pie).

=== Baladi ===
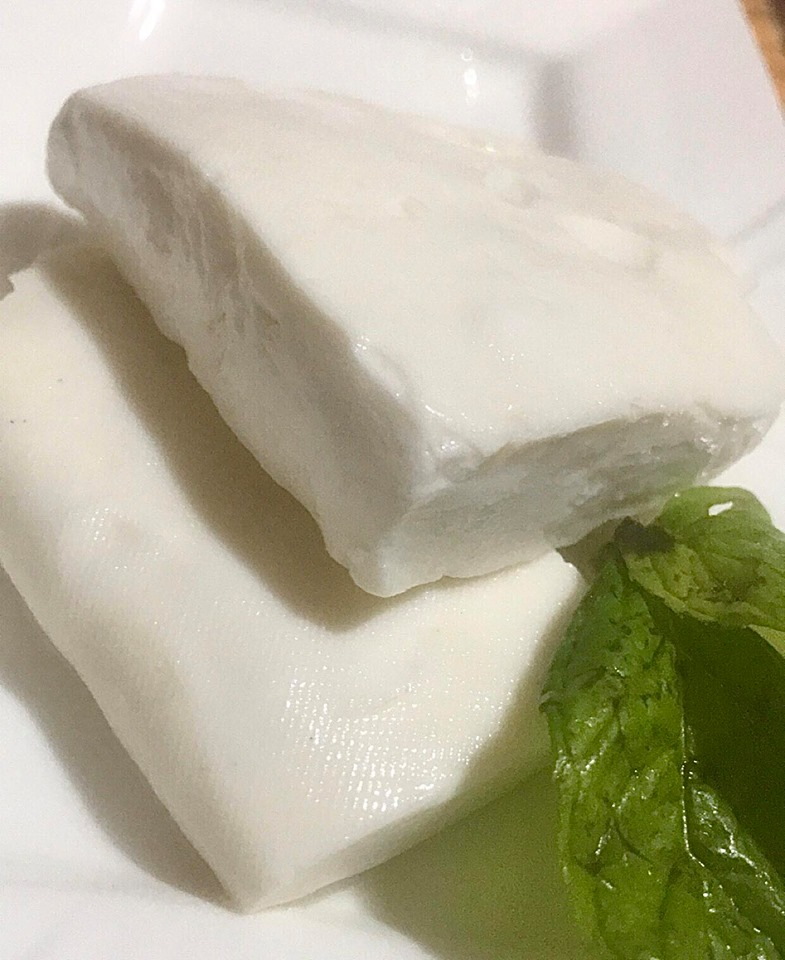
Baladi cheese

Baladi cheese is a soft-white, smooth, creamy cheese with a mild yet rich flavour, usually spread on fresh bread or crackers and most often eaten for breakfast or snacks. Baladi cheese is fresh, traditionally unpasteurized, and uncultured and is made with a mixture of goat, cow and sheep's milk. The presence of microorganisms and factors such as high moisture, being uncultured and unpasteurized tend to limit shelf life to just three days.

=== Circassian ===
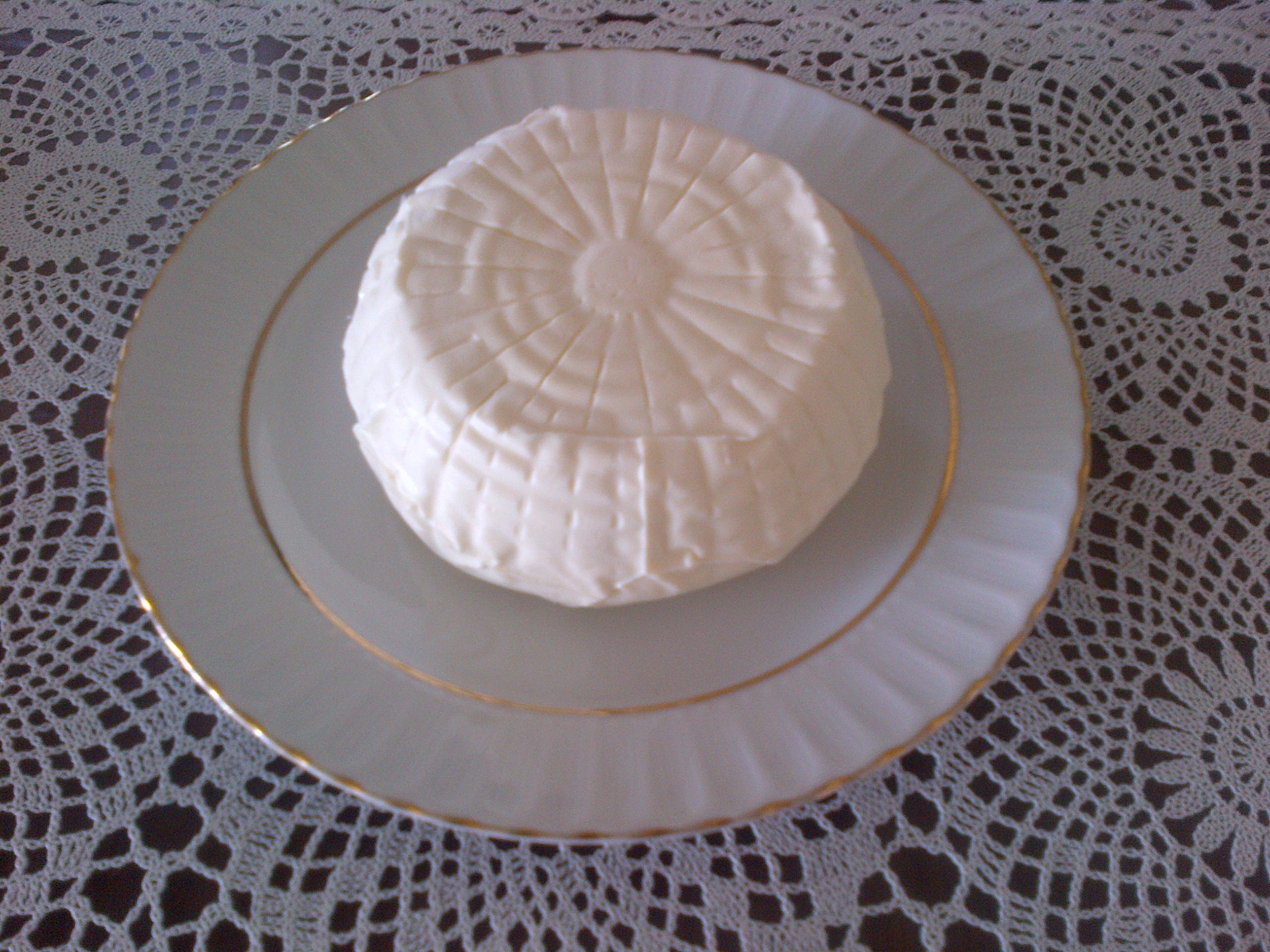
Circassian cheese

Circassian cheese is made across the Caucasus (Armenia, Azerbaijan, Georgia and parts of Russia) by the Circassian people. It is made with raw cow, sheep and/or goat's milk, while Adyghean cheese is made only with cow's milk. Circassian and Adyghean cheese are both made by producing curdles, which is achieved by adding acid to raw milk. The curdles don't melt even when exposed to high temperatures. There is also a 'smoked' version of this cheese. It is a tradition to compete to make the best type of Circassian cheese in Maykop, the capital of the Republic of Adyghea.

=== Jibneh Arabieh ===
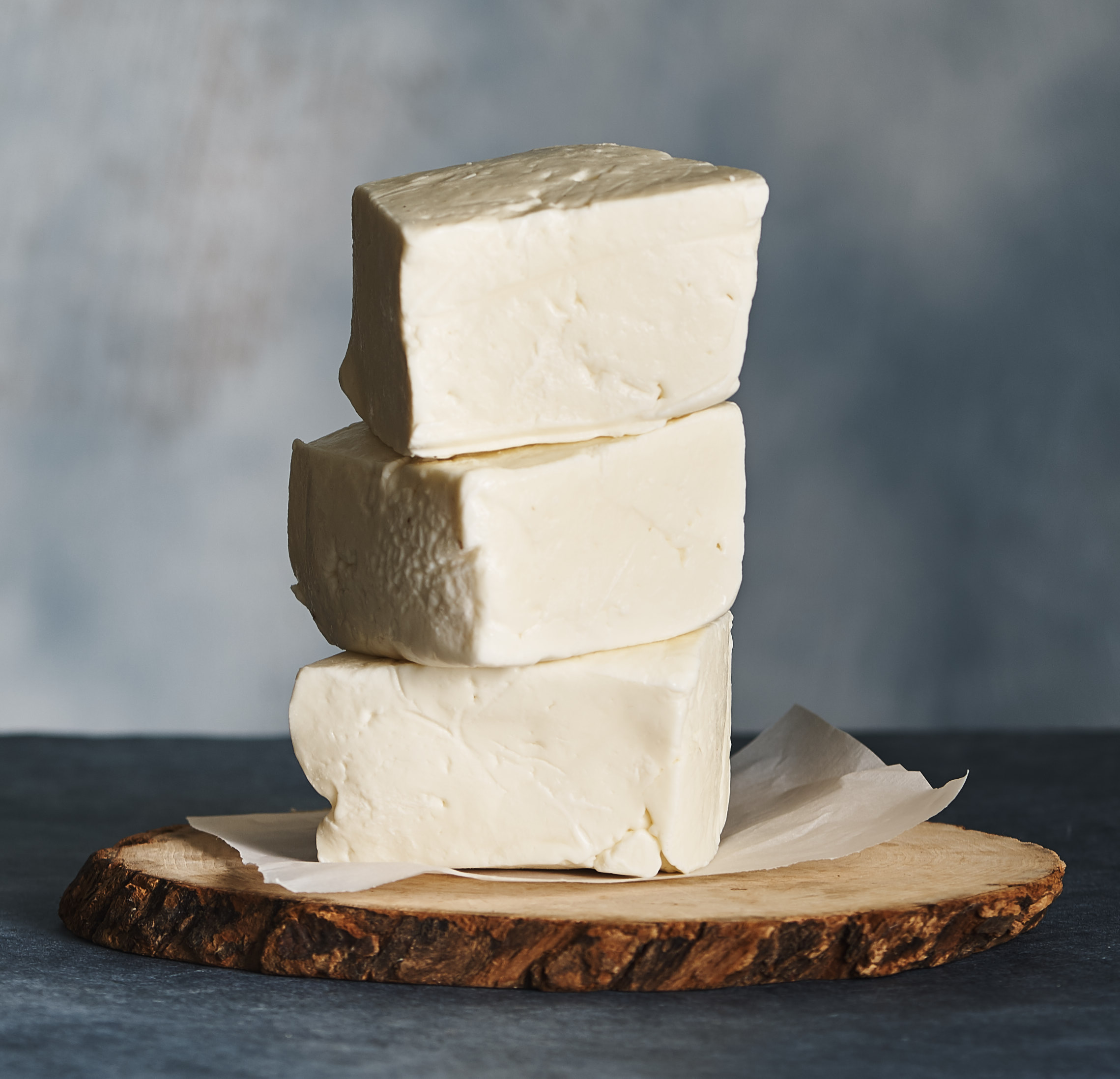
Blocks of jibneh arabieh/baida cheese

Jibneh Arabieh (Arabic for "Arab cheese") is also referred to as jibneh baida ("white cheese"). It is found throughout the Middle East and is particularly popular in Egypt and Eastern Arabia. It is a fresh cheese with a milky quality, a pronounced saltiness, medium-firmness, and excellent meltability. It can also be boiled before eating. While the product originated with Bedouins using goat or sheep milk, the current practice is to use cow's milk and to add mahleb, a spice ground from pits of the Prunus mahaleb cherry for a "slightly salty, sweet and nutty" flavor. Jibneh Arabieh is used in cooking or simply as a table cheese (a cheese that can be paired with a variety of foods and wines, and served with appetizers, soups, salads, main courses, and desserts).

=== Majdoule ===
Majdoule [(or, madjoul) means "braided" in Arabic] originates from Armenia and is incredibly popular for centuries and considered a culturally Syrian food [ mainly in ] Northern Syria. It is a salty white string cheese made up of thick strands braided together. It can be used in grilled cheese, sandwiches, eaten as a snack or after adding to Lebanese and pita bread and used for melting too.

=== Nabulsi ===
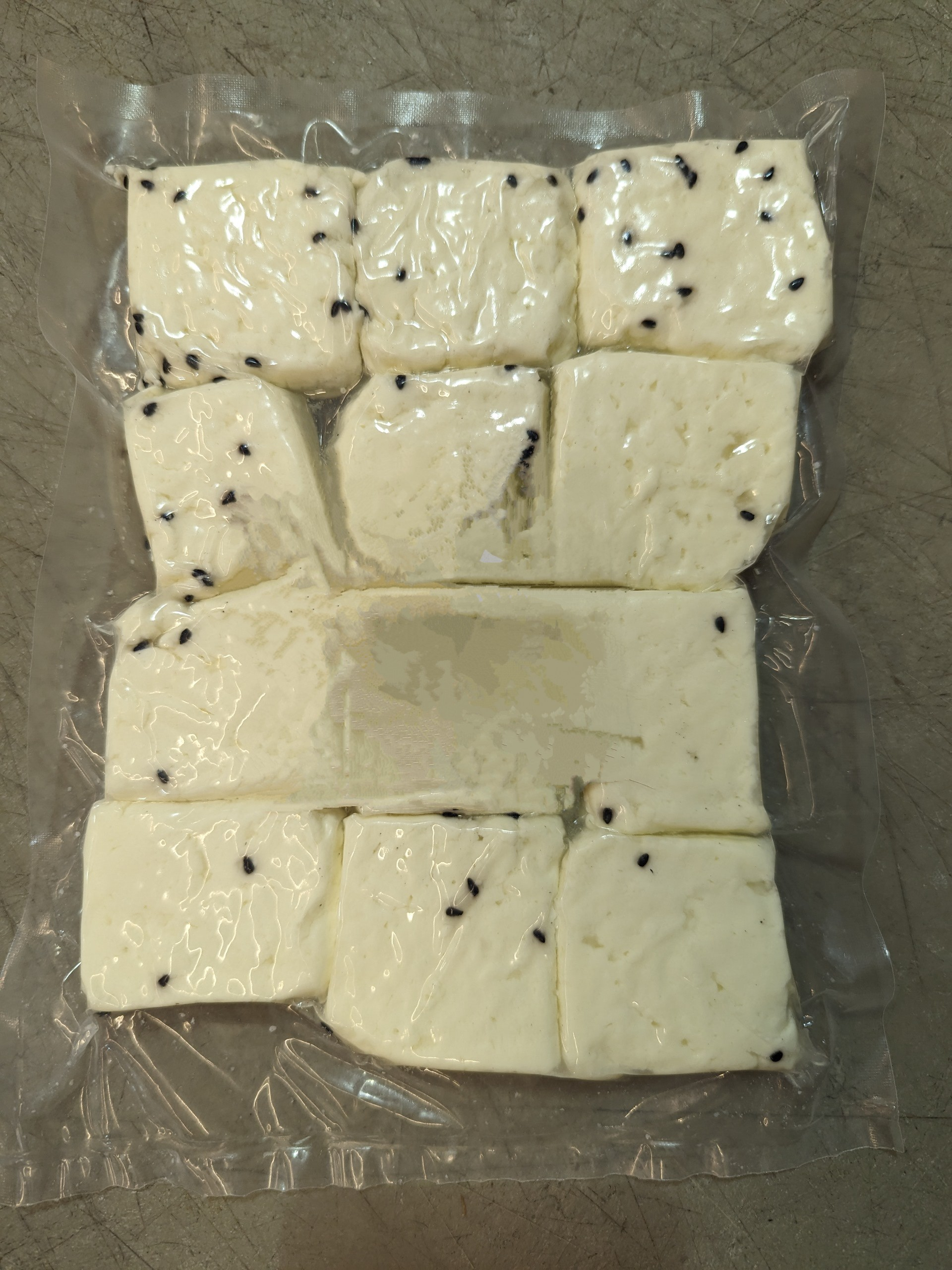
Firm, white Nabulsi cheese studded with black caraway seeds

Nabulsi cheese is a semi-hard cheese made primarily from sheep milk with goat milk being an alternative. It has a dense texture and melts easily. This cheese can be either salted or unsalted and is made from pasteurized milk from sheep, goats, or camels. It is also used as a base for other sweet-cheese desserts such as knafeh where it is almost always used.

=== Shanklish ===
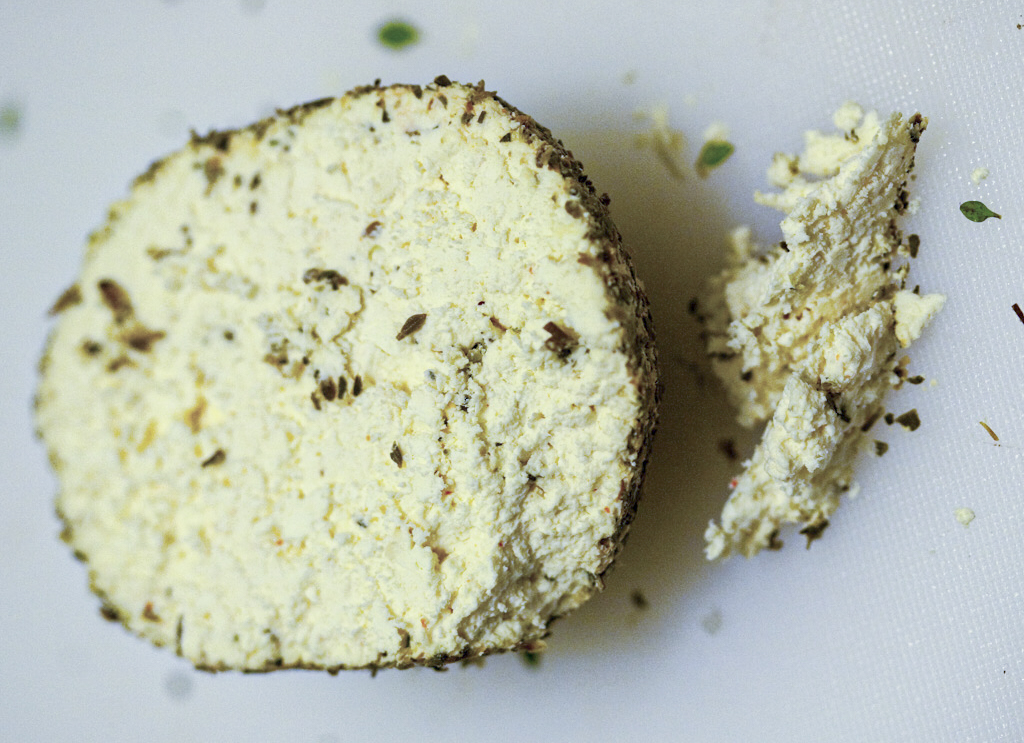
Shanklish cheese

Shanklish (also called surke) is a matured cheese made with spices and generally presented as balls covered in za'tar orchile powder or other dry herbs (thyme, oregano, garlic, and/or chili pepper). It is most often eaten as a starter dish with tomato, oil, and sometimes onion.

=== Jibneh Mshallale ===
Jibneh mshallale (or 'braided' cheese) is a form of string cheese originating in Syria. It is a fresh cheese, typically made from a combination of milks from cows, sheep, or goats. It is a cross between mozzarella, feta and halloumi (a cheese from the Cyprus that has a tangy taste and a firm, chewy texture).

=== Turkoman ===
Turkoman cheeses (Tulum, Kasar, Divle Obruk, Cevizli tulum) are soft, porous cheeses with a delicate flavor which can be consumed fresh or aged in bags made from animal skins. Turkoman cheeses are made with sheep milk or non-fat cow milk.
