= Syrian cuisine =

Culinary traditions of Syria

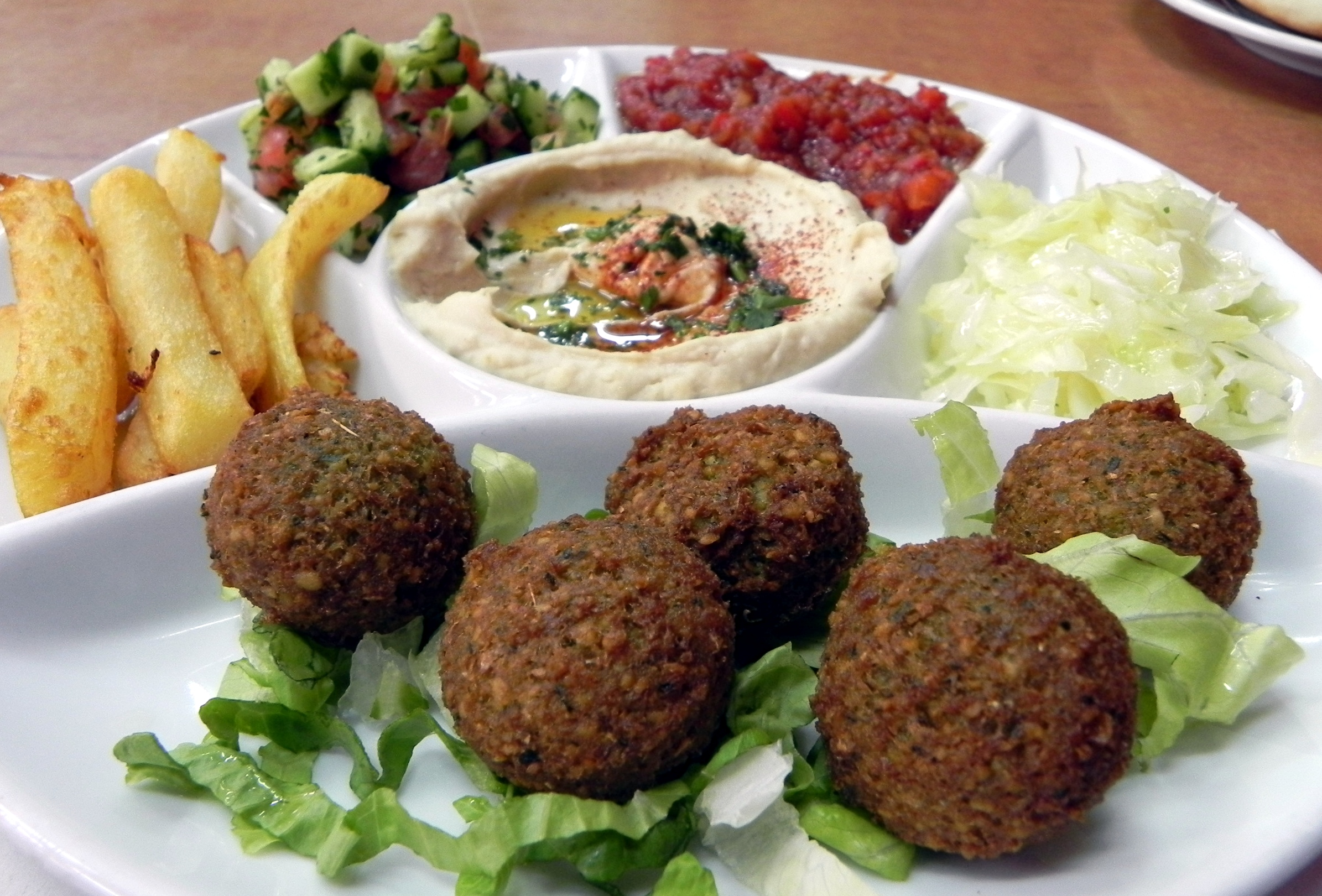
A typical Middle Eastern meal

Syrian cuisine is an Arab and Mediterranean cuisine that traces back to ancient civilization in Syria and the region. Syrian specialties makes use of eggplant, zucchini, garlic, meat (mostly from lamb and sheep), sesame seeds, rice, chickpeas, fava beans, lentils, steak, cabbage, cauliflower, vine leaves, pickled turnips, cucumbers, tomatoes, olive oil, lemon juice, mint, pistachios, honey and fruits.

Selections of appetizers known as mezze are customarily served along with Arabic bread before the Syrian meal's main course, which is followed by coffee, with sweet confections or fruits at will. Many recipes date from at least the 13th century.

== Foods ==
=== Meze ===
Name	Description
Baba ghanoush/ mtabbal (بابا غنوج)	eggplant (aubergine) mashed and mixed with seasonings
Baterish (باطرش)	mashed roasted eggplant
Falafel (فلافل)	a deep-fried ball or patty made from ground chickpeas, fava beans, or both
Fasolia bizzeit (فاصوليا بزيت)	green beans with olive oil, lemon and garlic
Fatteh (فتّة)	pieces of Arabic bread covered with other ingredients
Fattetil-makdus (فتّة المكدوس)	Fatteh with makdous and minced meat
Fatteh billahm (فتّة باللحم)	Fatteh with meat
Fatteh bissamn (فتّة بالسمن)	Fatteh made with beef or sheep tallow
Fatteh bizzayt (فتّة بالزيت)	Fatteh made with vegetable, corn, or olive oil
Fattet jaaj (فتّة دجاج)	Fatteh with chicken
Fattoush (فتوش)	salad made from several garden vegetables and toasted or fried pieces of pita bread
Halloumi cheese (جبنة حلومي)	usually sliced and grilled or fried
Harraa' esba'o (حراق اصبعو)	lentils with dough
Hummus (حمص)	a dip or spread made from cooked, mashed chickpeas, blended with tahini, olive oil, lemon juice, salt and garlic
Hummus billahm (حمص باللحم)	hummus with meat on top
Jez mez / jaz maz (جظ مظ)	eggs in tomato stew, Syrian shakshouka
Kishik (كشك)	drained yogurt
Kibbeh (كبة)	in the Middle East, dishes made of bulghur, chopped meat, and spices
Labneh (لبنة)	strained yogurt which tastes similar to cream or sour cream only more tart
Lahme bil'ajeen (لحم بعجين)	a thin piece of dough topped with minced meat and vegetables.
Makdous (مكدوس)	Stuffed and pickled eggplants
Makmoor (مكمور)	chopped zucchini with rice
Msaqqa'a (مسقعة)	grilled eggplant (aubergine) mashed with olive oil, tomato, onion and garlic
Mhammarah (محمرة)	a hot pepper dip from Aleppo, made from Aleppo pepper
Mtabbal (متبل)	mashed eggplant (aubergine) blended with tahini, olive oil, salt and garlic
Olives (زيتون)
Shakriyeh (شاكرية)	Lamb cooked in yoghurt
Shish kebab (شيش كباب)	skewered cubes of meat

=== Stuffed vine leaves ===
Name	Description
Yabrak (يبرق)	Grape leaves stuffed with rice and minced meat cooked and served hot
Yalanji (يالانجي)	Grape leaves stuffed with rice and a variety of vegetables and served hot or cold

=== Kebab ===
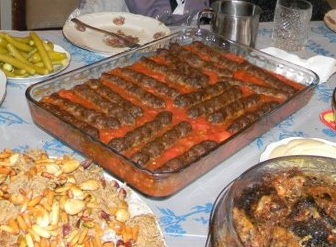
Kebab khashkhash from Aleppo

Name	Description
Kebab (كباب)	Grilled meat
Kebab halabi (كباب حلبي meaning "Aleppine kebab")	Kebab served with a spicy tomato sauce and Aleppo pepper, with about 26 variants including: Kebab hindi (كباب هندي), made from rolled lamb, with tomato paste, onion, capsicum and pomegranate molasses; Kebab kamayeh (كباب كميه), made from soft meat with truffle pieces, onion and various nuts; Kebab karaz (كباب كرز), made from lamb meatballs with cherries and cherry paste, pine nuts, sugar and pomegranate molasses; Kebab khashkhash (كباب خشخاش), made from rolled lamb or beef with chili pepper paste, parsley, garlic and pine nuts; Siniyyet kebab (صينيّة كباب), made from lean minced lamb served on a tray with chili pepper, onion and tomato

=== Kibbe ===
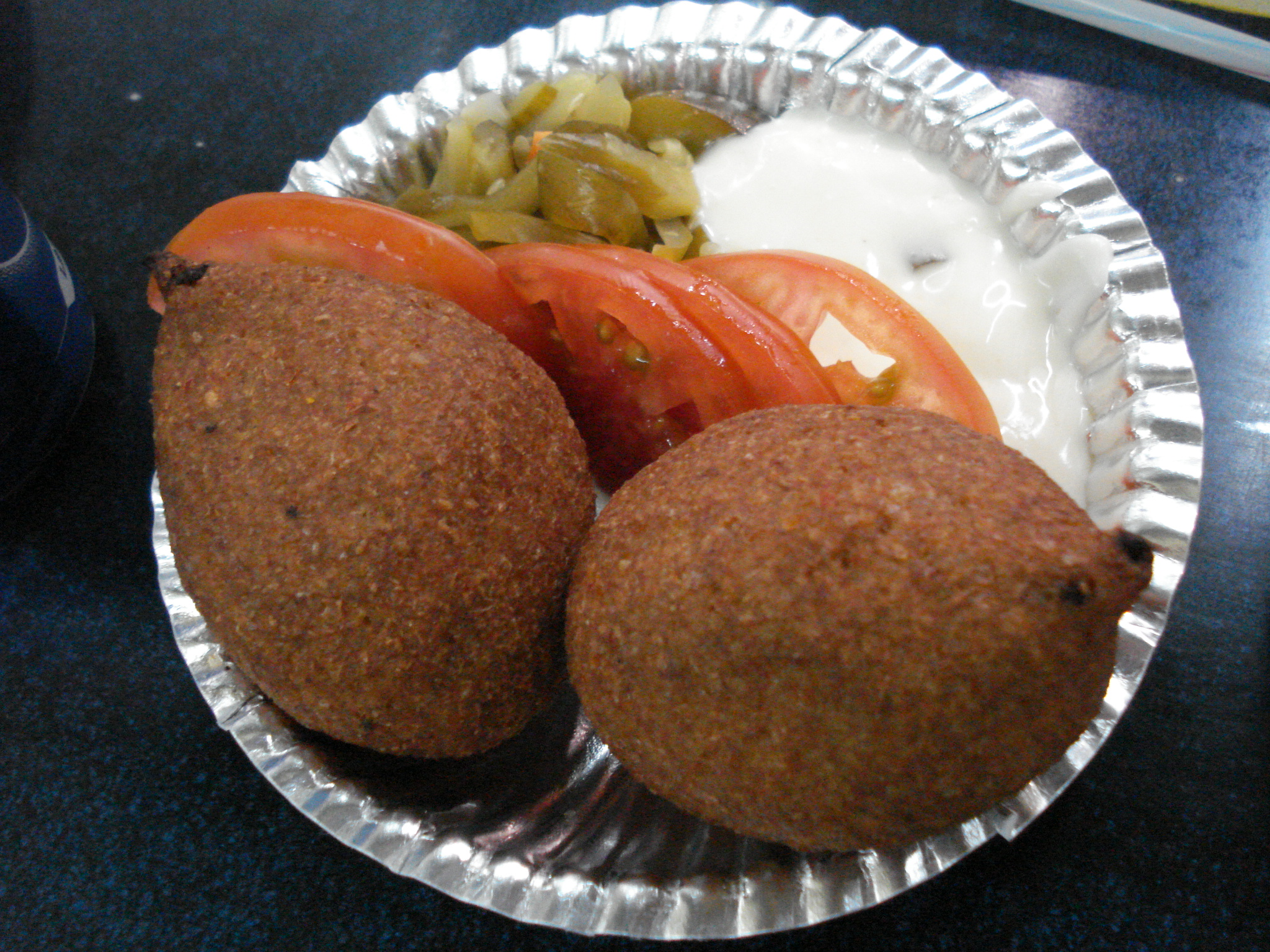
Kibbe

A variety of Syrian dishes made from a fried, baked, grilled, cooked, or raw mixture of bulghur and minced lamb are called kibbe (كبّة).

Name	Description
Kibbeh bisseniyyeh (كبّة بالصينيّة meaning "plate kibbeh")	A plate of baked kibbeh
Kibbeh Halabiyyeh (كبّة حلبيّة)	Kibbeh with a rice crust; though named after Aleppo
Kibbeh haamdah (كبّة حامضة)	Kibbeh with lemon juice
Kibbeh labaniyyeh (كبّة لبنيّة)	Cooked kibbeh with yogurt
Kibbeh 'qras (mishwiyyeh) ((كبّة أقراص (مشوية)	Grilled kibbeh
Kibbeh nayyeh (كبّة نيّة)	Raw kibbeh
Kibbeh safarjaliyyeh (كبّة سفرجليّة)	Kibbeh with quince
Kibbeh simmaa'iyyeh (كبّة سمّاقيّة)	Kibbeh with sumac

=== Mahshi (stuffed squash) ===
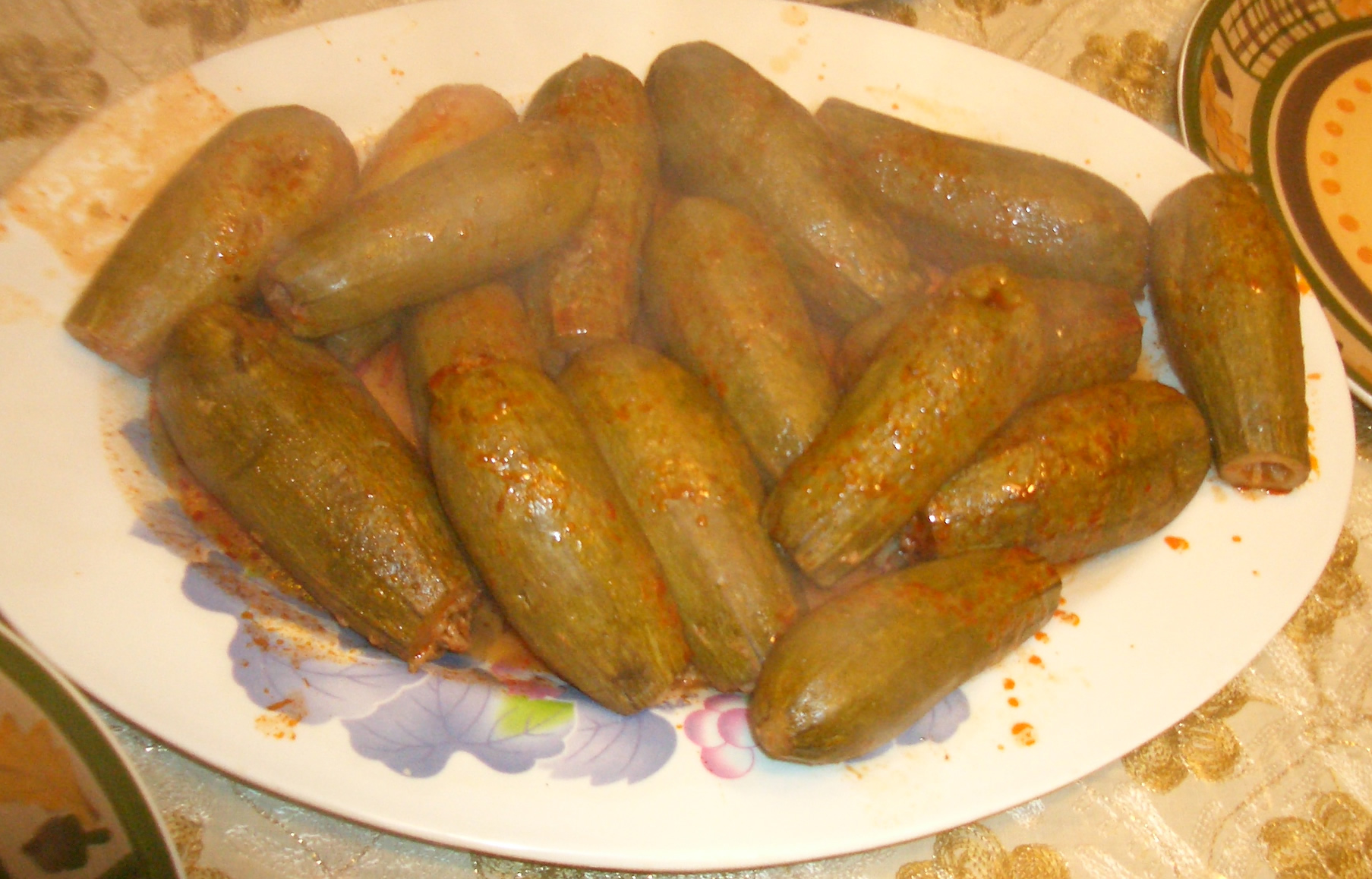
Kusa mahshi

A famous dish served in Syria is made from vegetables (usually zucchini—كوسا / kūsā, or eggplant—باذنجان / bādhinjān) which are stuffed (محشي / maḥshī) with ground beef or lamb or mutton, nuts, and rice.

=== Street food ===
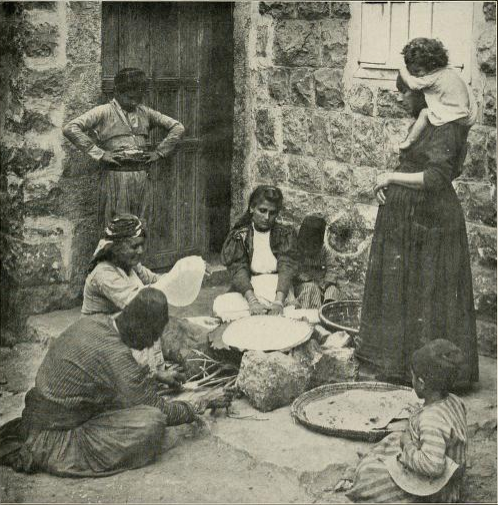
Baking flat bread in the 1910s

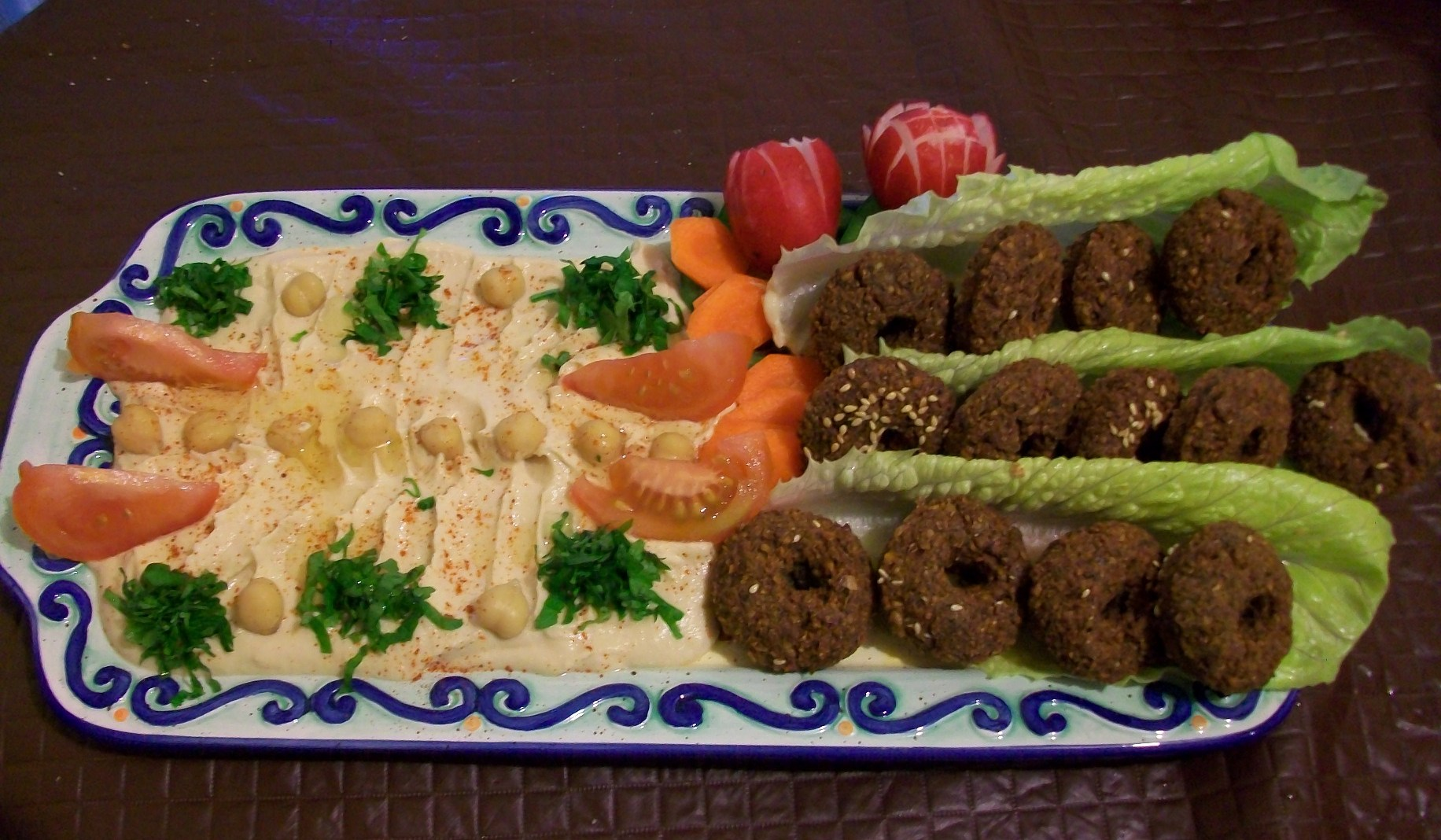
Falafil and hummus in a Syrian breakfast

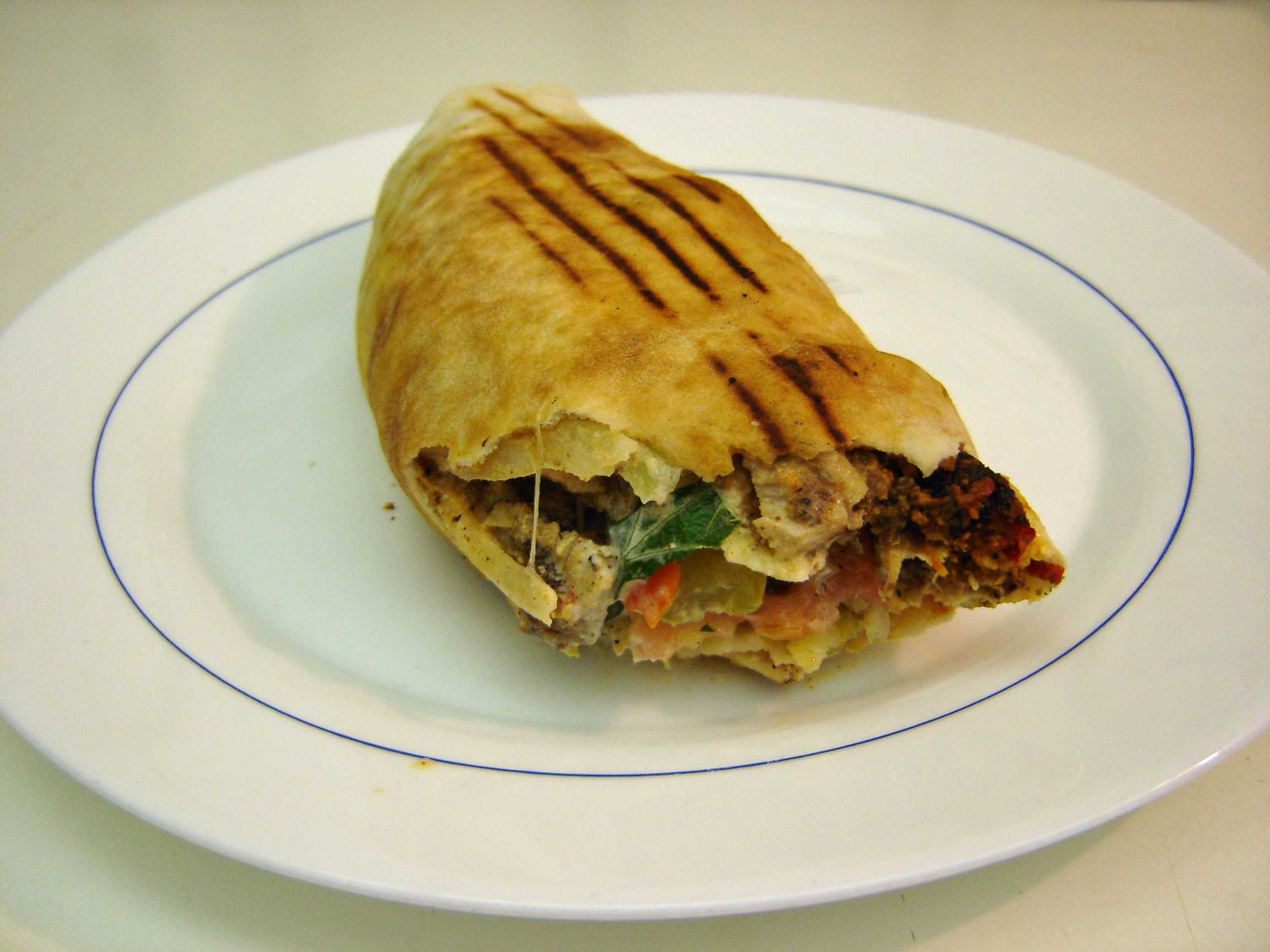
Shawarma

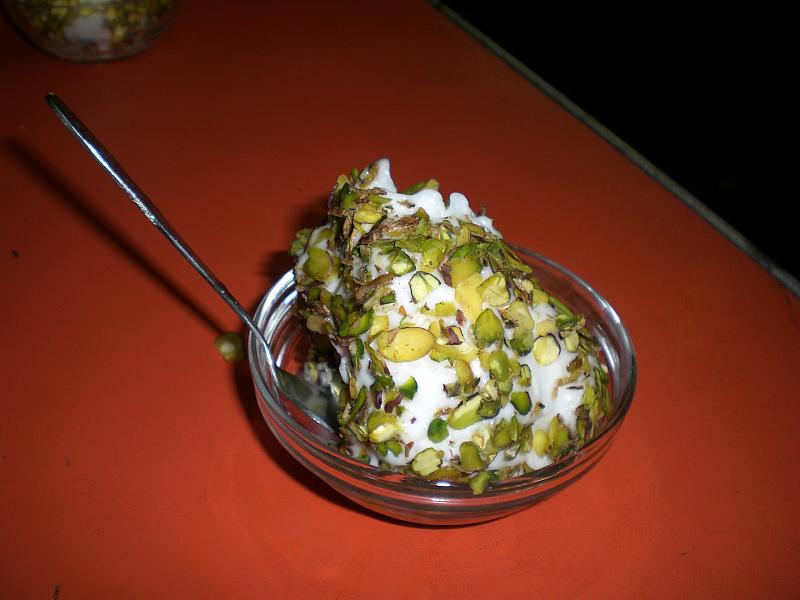
Booza

Syrian street food includes:

Name	Description
Booza (بوظة)	Ice cream known for its elastic texture, which is caused by the presence of mastic
Falafil (فلافل)	Fried balls or patties of spiced, mashed chickpeas, most often served in Arabic bread, with pickles, tahina, hummus, sumac, cut-vegetable salad and often, shatteh, a hot sauce, the type used depending on the falafil maker
Ka'ak (كعك)	Rings of bread, made from farina and other ingredients, commonly sprinkled with sesame seeds, occasionally served on the table to accompany Syrian cheese; a buttery and sweetened version, filled with crushed dates or walnuts, is eaten as a dessert, usually served to eat with string cheese shaped into a braid (jibneh mashallaleh)
Manakish (مناقيش)	Dough topped with za'atar, cheese or ground meat; it can be sliced or folded, and it can be served either for breakfast or lunch
Shawarma (شاورما)	Sliced and marinated meat shaved off a roasting skewer and stuffed into Arabic bread or sometimes baguette, alone with hummus, or with additional trimmings such as fresh onion, French fries, salads and pickles
Maarouk (معروك)	A sweet bread stuffed with date paste and topped with sesame seeds, and served in a wide variety of shapes, popular during Ramadan.

=== Sweets ===
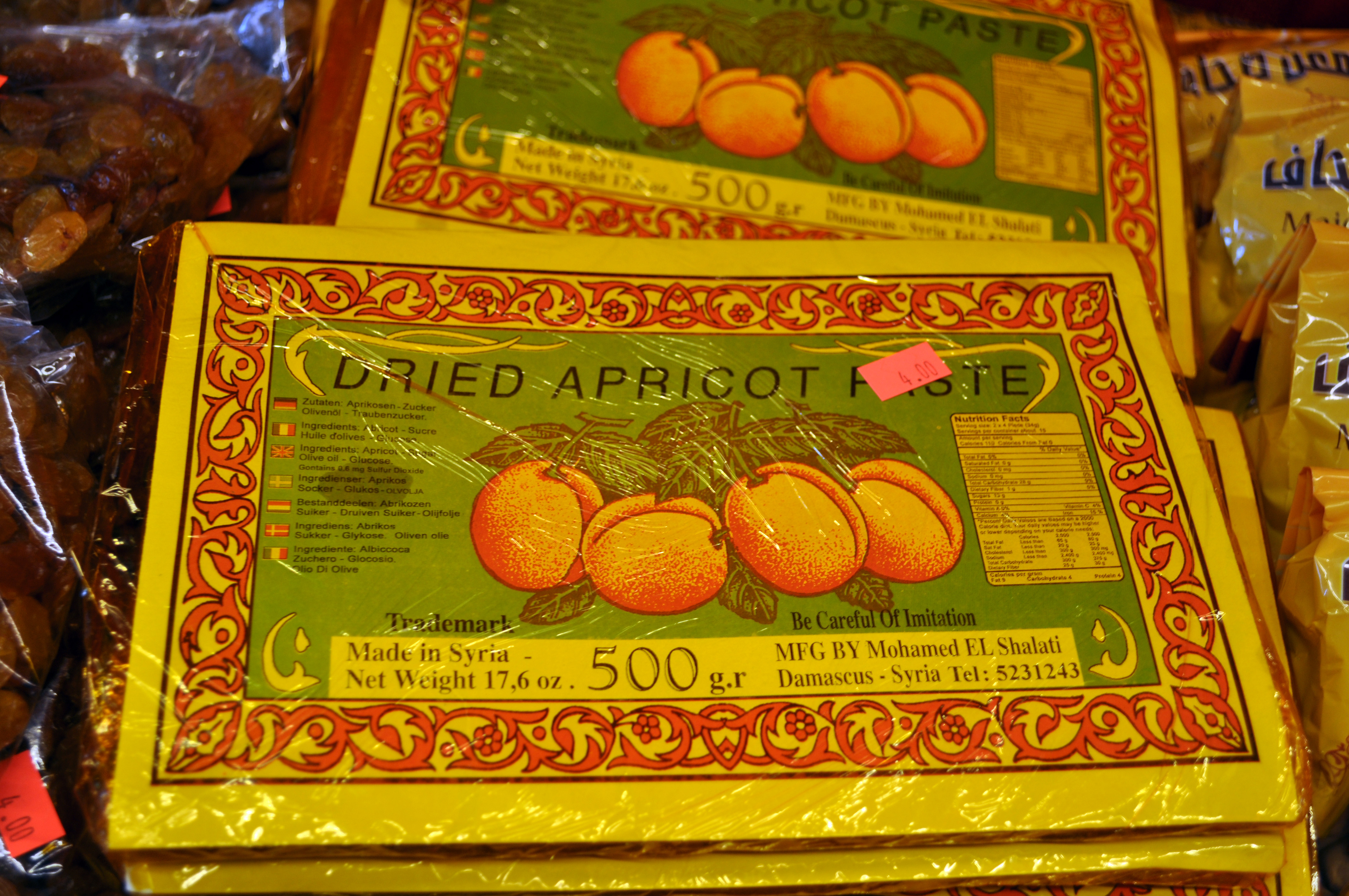
Dried-apricot paste (qamar ad-din)

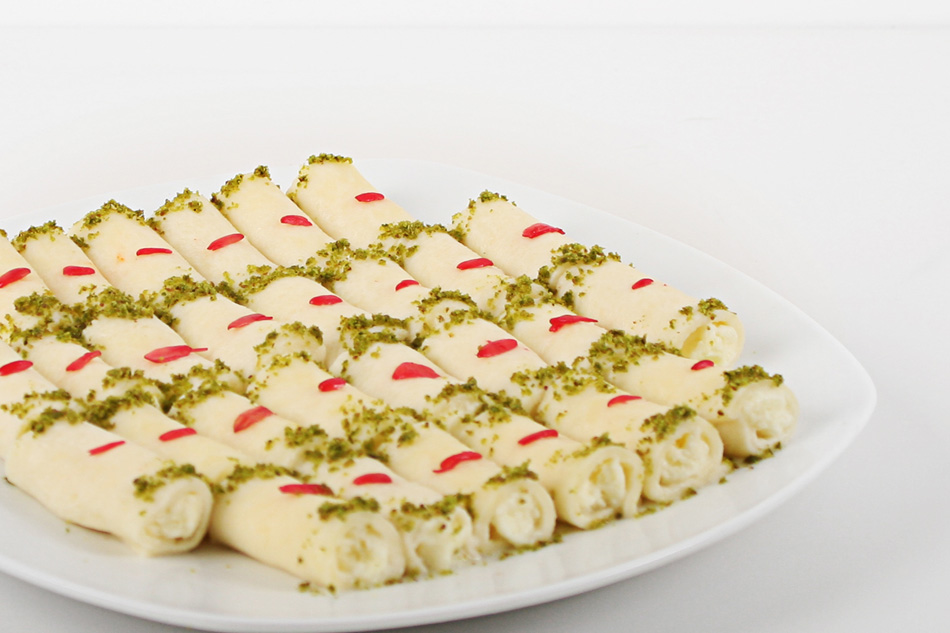
Halawet al-jibn

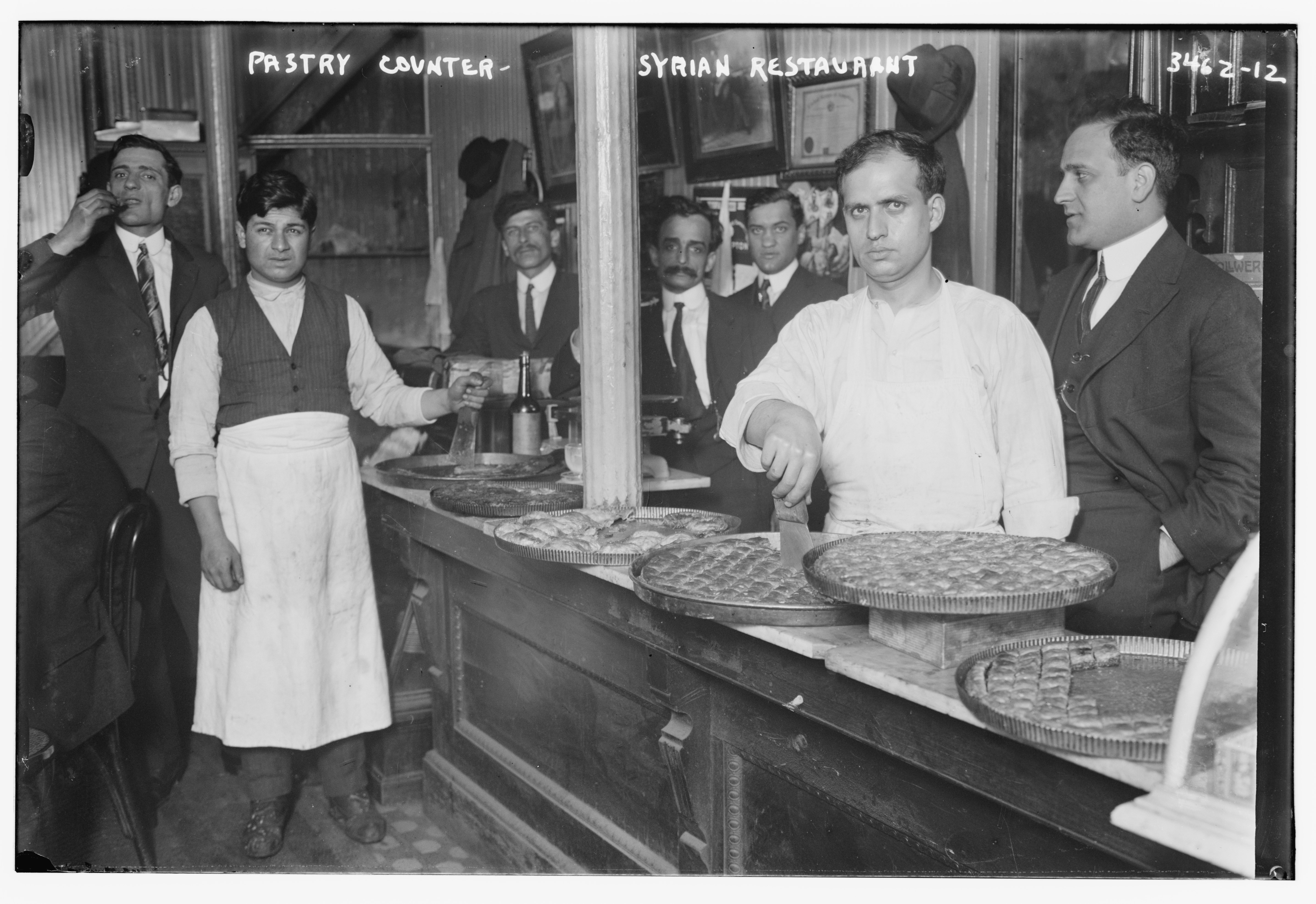
Pastry counter at a Syrian restaurant in Little Syria (Manhattan), 1910

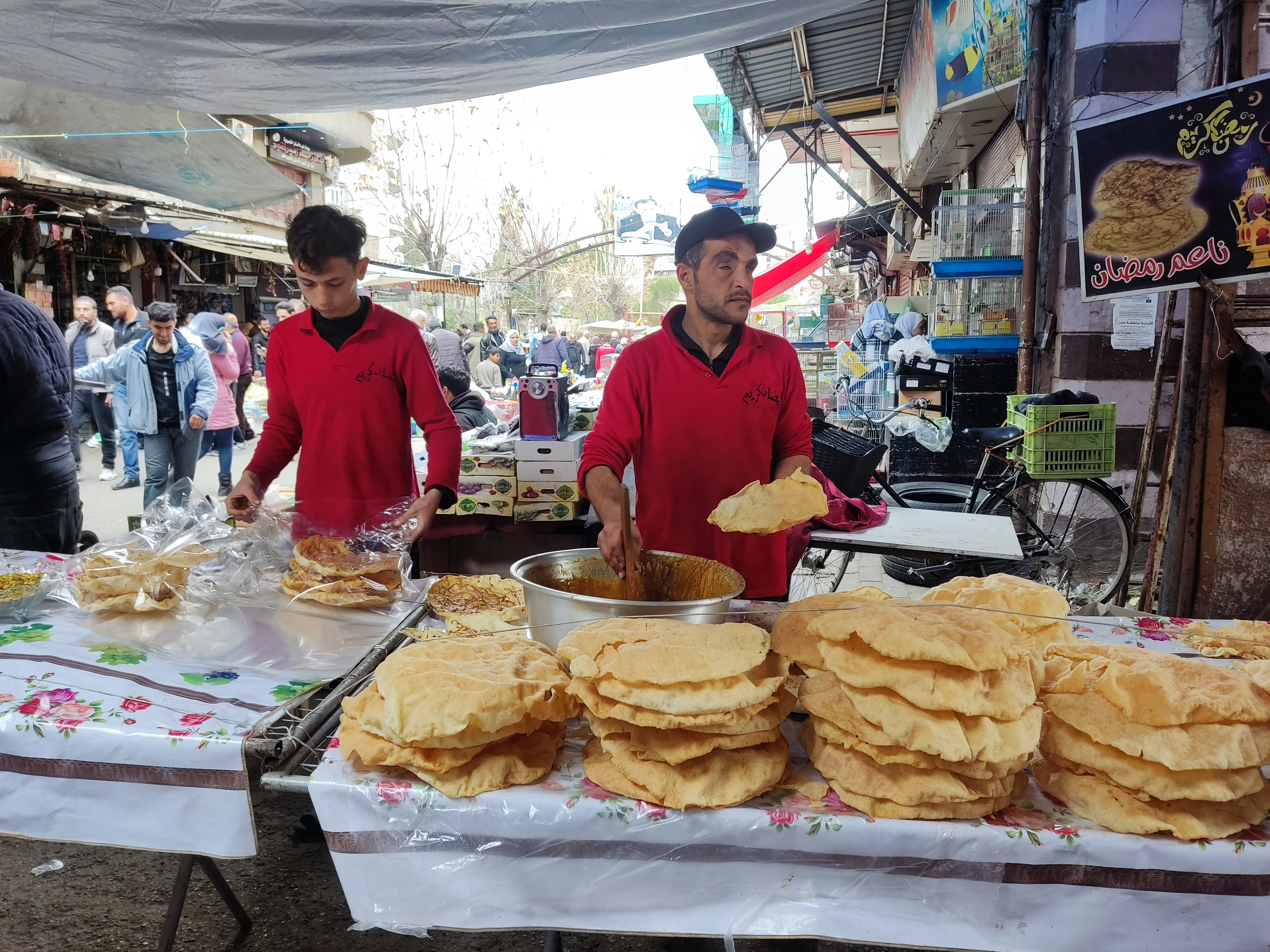
Naem bread salesman, brushing the bread with grape syrup

Name	Description
Ba'lawah (بقلاوة)	Layered pastry filled with nuts, steeped in a honey syrup called atr (قطر), and usually cut in a triangular or diamond shape
Barazek (برازق)	A sort of sesame seed cookie, made from white sesame seeds, butter, sugar, milk and honey
Basbousa (بسبوسة)	A sweet cake made of cooked semolina or farina soaked in simple syrup
Bashmina (البشمينا)	Syrian-style cotton candy. Made mainly from flour with a honey syrup called atr (قطر).
Bilatat jahanam (بلاطة جهنم meaning "Hell's tile")	Made mainly from sugar and flour with a red food coloring
Crêpe (كريب)	A very thin French pastry with butter and sugar
Ghazal al-banat (غزل البنات)	Sugar cotton candy stuffed with pistachios or cashews
Halaweh homsiyyeh (حلاوة حمصيّة)	Also known as al Qurmashliya, made from flour, water and salt, fried with oil until they form little pieces, which would be colored afterwards
Halawet al-jibn (حلاوة الجبن)	Pastry rolled and stuffed with cheese or thick milk cream, served with a honey syrup called atr (قطر)
Halweh (حلوة)	A slab of sesame paste studded with fruit and candy/sweets
Haytaliya (هيطلية)	A sort of milk pudding
Kanafeh (كنافة)	Shoelace pastry dessert stuffed with sweet white cheese, nuts and syrup
Ma'mul (معمول)	Biscuits filled with dates, pistachios or walnuts, and shaped in a wooden mould called tabi (طابع), a popular sweet on Christian holidays (Easter), Muslim holidays ('Id al-Fitr), and Jewish holidays (Purim)
Mamuniyyeh (مامونيّة)	Mixture of semolina and ghee simmered in water with sugar, usually served with salty cheese or milk cream called qishteh (قشطة)
Muhallebi (مهلبية)	A sort of milk pudding
Nabulsiyyeh (نابلسيّة)	A layer of semi-salty Nabulsi cheese covered with a semolina dough and drizzled with a honey syrup called atr (قطر)
Naem (Arabic: ناعم)	A fried flatbread covered in syrup
Qada'ef (قطايف)	Semolina dough stuffed with a paste made from sweet walnuts or milk cream, with a honey syrup called atr (قطر)
Qamar al-din (قمر الدين)	Dried apricot paste
Raha (راحة)	A confection based on a gel of starch and sugar
Rice pudding (رز بحليب)	Made from rice mixed with water or milk and other ingredients such as cinnamon
Simsimiyah (السمسمية)	A confection of sesame seeds and sugar or honey, with some Saponaria
Suwar as-sitt (سوار الست meaning "lady's wristlet")	A disc-shaped pastry steeped in a honey syrup called atr (قطر) while the centre is covered with smashed pistachios
Taj al-malik (تاج الملك meaning "king's crown")	Round dry pastry, the centre of which is filled with pistachios, cashews or other nuts
Zilabiyyeh (زلابيّة)	Thin sheets of semolina dough, boiled, rolled and stuffed with pistachios or milk cream called qishteh (قشطة)
Znud as-sitt (زنود الست meaning "lady's arms")	Phyllo pastries with various fillings

== Cheeses ==
- Halloumi—a semi-hard, unripened, brined cheese
- Jibne baida—a white hard cheese with a pronounced salty taste
- Jibne khadra—a form of string cheese, originated in Syria, also known as jibneh mshallaleh
- Shanklish—a type of blue cheese made from cow's or sheep's milk and often served topped with dried thyme and olive oil

== Beverages ==
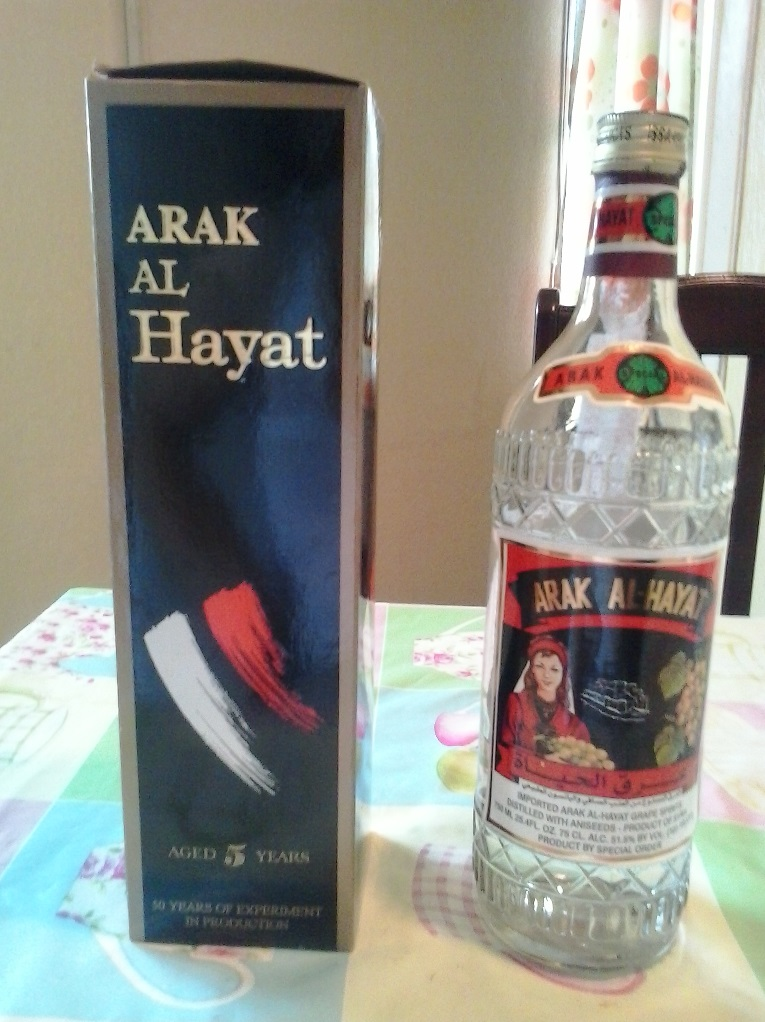
Special edition of 5-year-aged Arak al-Hayat ('ara') from Homs, Syria

Name	Description
Al-mateh (المته)	A caffeine-infused drink produced from ground yerba mate leaves and served hot
'Ara' (عرق)	A distilled alcoholic spirit, transparent in color, made from grapes and spiced with anise seeds
Ayran (عيران)	A yogurt-based beverage mixed with salt and water
Jallab (جلاب)	A fruit syrup which can be combined with liquid to form a hot or warm beverage
Polo (بولو)	Mint lemonade
Qahweh bayda' (قهوة بيضاء meaning "white coffee")	A caffeine-free drink made from water and orange blossom water, sweetened with sugar at will, usually served in lieu of coffee
Qamar al-din (قمر الدين)	A thick apricot juice, typically served for Iftar during Ramadan
Salep (سحلب)	A traditional winter beverage, made with a flour from the tubers of the orchid genus Orchis; salep flour is consumed in beverages and desserts
Syrian beer (البيرة السوريّة)	A beverage prepared from yeast-fermented malt, flavored with hops
Syrian coffee (قهوة)	A beverage made from lightly roasted coffee beans along with cardamom, and served in small cups (as with Turkish coffee)
Wine (نبيذ)	An alcoholic beverage made from fermented grapes
'Ara' Al-suse (عرق السوس)	Liquorice drink is prepared from the roots of liquorice, and it is a refreshing drink with many benefits, and it is often prepared cold and in the summer

== See also ==
- Mediterranean cuisine
- Levantine cuisine
- Middle Eastern cuisine
- Arab cuisine
