= White cheese =

Variety of cheese with a white hue

White cheese includes a wide variety of cheese types invented in different regions, sharing the sole common characteristic of their white hue. The specific type of white cheese can vary significantly depending on geographical location.

== Names ==
- Egyptian Arabic: جبنه بيضا gebna beda
- Arabic: جبنة بيضاء, jubna bayda – Akkawi, Jibneh Arabieh, Nabulsi cheese
- Bulgarian: бяло сирене, bjalo sirene
- French: fromage blanc
- German: Weißkäse – Quark or brined white cheese
- Greek: λευκό τυρί, lefko tyri – any brined white cheese that is not feta
- Hebrew: גבינה לבנה, gvina levana
- Italian: formaggio bianco – ricotta, mozzarella
- Macedonian: бело сирење, belo sirenje
- Portuguese: queijo branco – fresh Minas cheese
- Romanian: brânză albă – telemea
- Serbo-Croatian: бели сир, bijeli sir
- Slovene: beli sir
- Spanish: queso blanco – costeño cheese, cuajada, llanero cheese, Oaxaca cheese, panela cheese, queso de mano
- Tagalog: kesong puti
- Turkish: beyaz peynir

== White cheese by region ==
=== The Americas ===
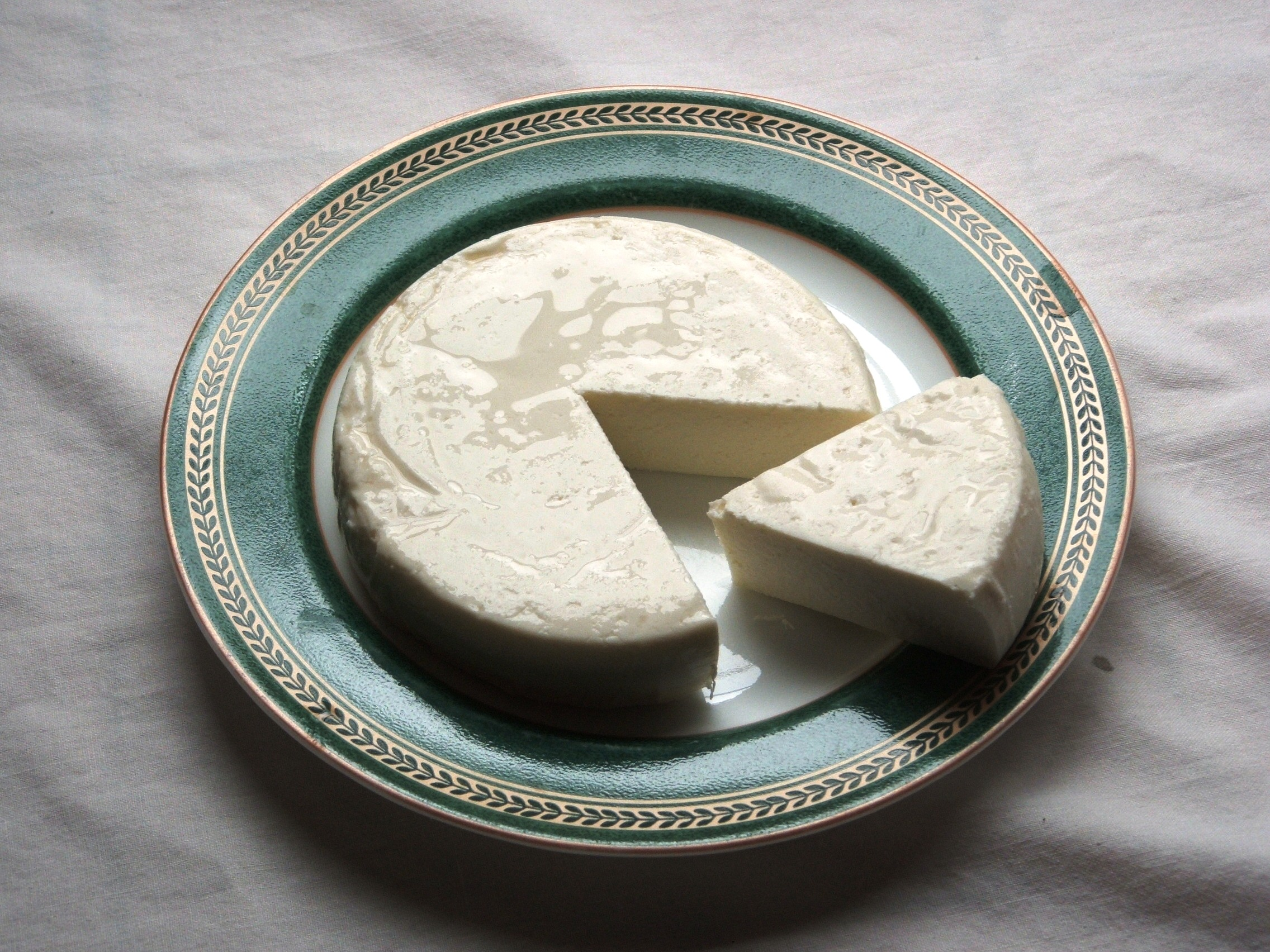
A plate of queso blanco

In Latin America, queso blanco (Spanish) or queijo branco (Portuguese) refers to various white cheeses, with the specific type varying by region.

Queso blanco is considered an easy cheese to make, as does not require careful handling, rennet, or bacterial culture. It is usually made by heating whole fresh milk to near-boiling, adding an acidifying agent such as vinegar, stirring until curds form, then draining the curds in cheesecloth for three to five hours. Such cheeses are also known as "bag cheeses," as the curds are normally hung in a bag of cheesecloth to drain. As it is highly perishable, it must be refrigerated or used immediately once the whey has drained out.

Queso blanco and queso fresco may be eaten alone or added to other dishes. They are often used as a topping for spicy Mexican dishes such as enchiladas and empanadas or crumbled over soups or salads. Meltable versions are used to make quesadillas. It is used to make cheesecake in some parts of the world.

The following cheese names may refer to queso blanco in the Spanish-speaking world or be considered similar to any of its local varieties: asadero, halloumi, Indian paneer, farmer cheese, pot cheese, quark from Central and Eastern Europe

==== Brazil ====
In Brazilian cuisine, white cheese goes by the name queijo branco (Portuguese pronunciation: [ˈkejʒu ˈbɾɐ̃ku]). Minas cheese, a Brazilian cheese, is usually fresh.

==== Colombia ====
On the Caribbean coast, the most popular cheese is queso costeño. It can be either hard and salty or soft and low in salt. People mainly have it with breakfast, in dishes like mote de queso, or grated in foods like arepas and bollos (especially the hard and salty kind). One variation is known as queso de capa de Mompós.

==== Mexico ====
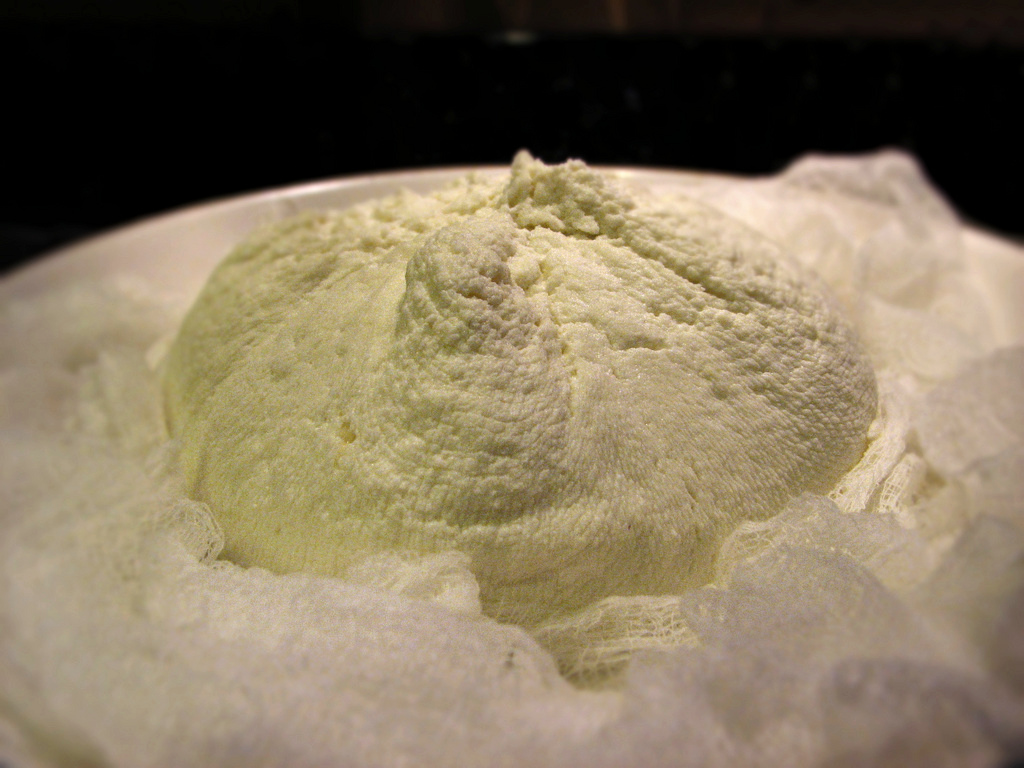
Freshly pressed Mexican queso fresco sitting in cheesecloth

Mexican cuisine features two main variations of white cheese. queso blanco, traditionally made from cow's milk, and queso fresco (Spanish pronunciation: [ˈkeso ˈfɾesko]), which may include a combination of cow's and goat's milk. While certain types like Oaxaca cheese melt when heated, the majority simply become soft when exposed to heat. If it is pressed, and more water is removed, it becomes known as queso seco.

In regions such as Guerrero, Zacatecas, and San Luis Potosí, goat's milk cuajada (curd) is utilized in desserts like gorditas de cuajada and panes de dulce.

In Jalisco, where it is commonly known as panela, this cheese variety is employed in crafting pan de cuajada and tamales de cuajada.

Many Mexican home cooks make their own instead of purchasing it. When made for the evening meal, it is often prepared in the early afternoon and left to drain until evening.

==== Dominican Republic ====
In Dominican Republic cuisine queso blanco is a firm, salty cheese used for frying: queso frito.

==== Nicaragua ====
In Nicaraguan cuisine, queso blanco is a firm cheese used for frying: queso frito. Cheese is one of the most popular dairy products in the daily diet. You can find various kinds, including cuajada fresca (fresh curd), cuajada ahumada (smoked curd) with and without chili, and cuajada ahumada with spices.

The smoking process varies. They are shaped into small balls, put on a wooden grill called tapezco, and a fire is lit underneath using firewood that produces significant amounts of smoke. Another preparation method is to bake them in an oven for 10 minutes until they are golden and have acquired a smoky flavor.

People enjoy these cheeses with güirila or corn tortillas, or use them as fillings in tamales. They also mix cheese into corn masa in revueltas and use it as a filling in griddled quesadillas, or add rapadura de dulce or sugar for fillings in oven-baked empanadas.

==== Peru ====
In Peruvian cuisine, several recipes mix queso fresco and spices to make a spicy cold sauce eaten over peeled boiled potatoes, such as papa a la huancaína or ocopa.

==== Puerto Rico ====
In Puerto Rican cuisine, queso blanco is a firm cheese used for frying and typically paired with guava paste. The cheese also goes by queso fresco and queso blanco del país. Although still popular, it has been losing consumers due to higher-quality cheese becoming available on the island.

==== Venezuela ====
Venezuelan cuisine has a large diversity of white cheese (quesos blancos), varying in texture and flavor, usually named after a geographical region.

Examples include queso blanco duro (hard white cheese called llanero), queso semi-blando (semi-soft cheese, called paisa or palmita), or very tender types like guayanés cheese or queso de mano. The hard version is grated as a side for the national dish pabellón, and it's also used as a topping for pasta and as a filling for arepas and empanadas. The softer types are used as fillings for arepas and cachapas.

=== Eurasia and North Africa ===
White cheese is a traditional food in Balkan and Middle eastern regions.

Most cheese produced in the Middle East is white cheese, and most is pickled in salty brine. It is common to soak cheese in water to desalt it prior to consumption. In warm areas with no access to refrigeration, brining is an effective method for conserving cheese. While the preparation method and ingredients of the different cheeses may differ, there are many instances where different varieties of cheese do not possess a well documented name.

==== Central and Eastern Europe ====
Quark, a type of fresh cheese in Central and Eastern Europe, is known by different names in various regions, such as tvaroh (Czech), twaróg (Polish), tvorog (Russian), topfen (Austrian), biezpiens (Latvian), and varškė (Lithuanian).

==== Cyprus ====
Halloumi cheese is a very popular Cypriot cheese, usually made from sheep or goat milk, with a semi-hard to hard texture, but is elastic when heated.

==== Egypt ====
Domiati, a soft, white, salty cheese, is primarily produced in Egypt and some Middle Eastern countries.

==== France and Belgium ====
Fromage blanc is a fresh cheese from France and Belgium.

==== Greece ====
Greece offers a range of white cheeses. Among these options are feta, a brined curd cheese. Manouri, a semi-soft, fresh white whey cheese, is crafted from goat and/or sheep milk whey remaining after cheese production. Mizithra, another choice, is an unpasteurized fresh cheese. It's a Greek traditional delicacy made using milk and whey sourced from sheep and/or goats.

==== Italy ====
Italy has a variety of white cheeses. Among them, Asiago cheese is a cow's milk cheese known for its varying textures according to its aging, from smooth for the fresh Asiago (Asiago Pressato) to a crumbly texture for the aged cheese (Asiago d'allevo) of which the flavor is reminiscent of Parmesan. Another Italian cheese is Mascarpone, a cheese made from cream, coagulated by the addition of citric acid or acetic acid. Mozzarella, originally from southern Italy, is a fresh cheese traditionally made from Italian buffalo and later cow's milk by the pasta filata method. There also is Ricotta, a whey cheese made from sheep (or cow, goat, or Italian water buffalo) milk whey left over from the production of cheese.

==== Levant ====
In Levantine cuisine, a variety of white cheeses exist, including: Akkawi, a salty, brined, and semi-hard white cheese that is named after the city of Akka, Nabulsi cheese, a cheese flavored with mastic and prunus mahaleb often used in making knafeh nabulsieh, it is named after the city of Nablus, baladi cheese, a fresh cheese typically made from goat milk, it sometimes called mountain cheese due to the fact its often made in the mountains of Lebanon, and mujaddal cheese, a sort of braided cheese.

There are also varieties of fermented cheese common to this region, like shanklish.

==== The Philippines ====
In Philippine cuisine, kesong puti, a soft, white cheese, similar to queso blanco and cottage cheese, is made from unskimmed carabao's milk, salt and rennet.

==== Portugal ====
In Portuguese cuisine, queijo fresco (Portuguese pronunciation: [ˈkeijʒu ˈfɾeʃku]) refers to a popular mild, soft, creamy, white unaged cheese used throughout the Iberian Peninsula. In the Azores queijo fresco is typically served with the fresh pepper sauce pimenta de terra.

==== Romania ====
Caș is a type of semi-soft white fresh cheese made from sheep or cow milk, produced in Romania. Another type of white cheese traditionally made in Romania is telemea, a salty variety, made of sheep or cow milk.

==== Turkey ====
Beyaz peynir is a salty, white cheese made from unpasteurized sheep (or cow) milk. The cheese has a slightly grainy appearance and is similar to Greek feta cheese.

==== Southeastern Europe ====
Sirene / Sirenje (Bulgarian: сирене, pronounced [ˈsirɛnɛ]; Macedonian: сирење, pronounced [ˈsireɲe]; Serbian/Croatian: сир, sir, Albanian: djath i bardhe), also known as "white brine sirene" (Bulgarian: бяло саламурено сирене, [ˈbjaɫo sɐɫɐˈmurɛno ˈsirɛnɛ], is a type of brine cheese made in South-Eastern Europe. It is especially popular in Bulgaria, the Republic of North Macedonia, and other Balkan countries.
