= Sheikh al-mahshi =

Stuffed eggplant or zucchini dish

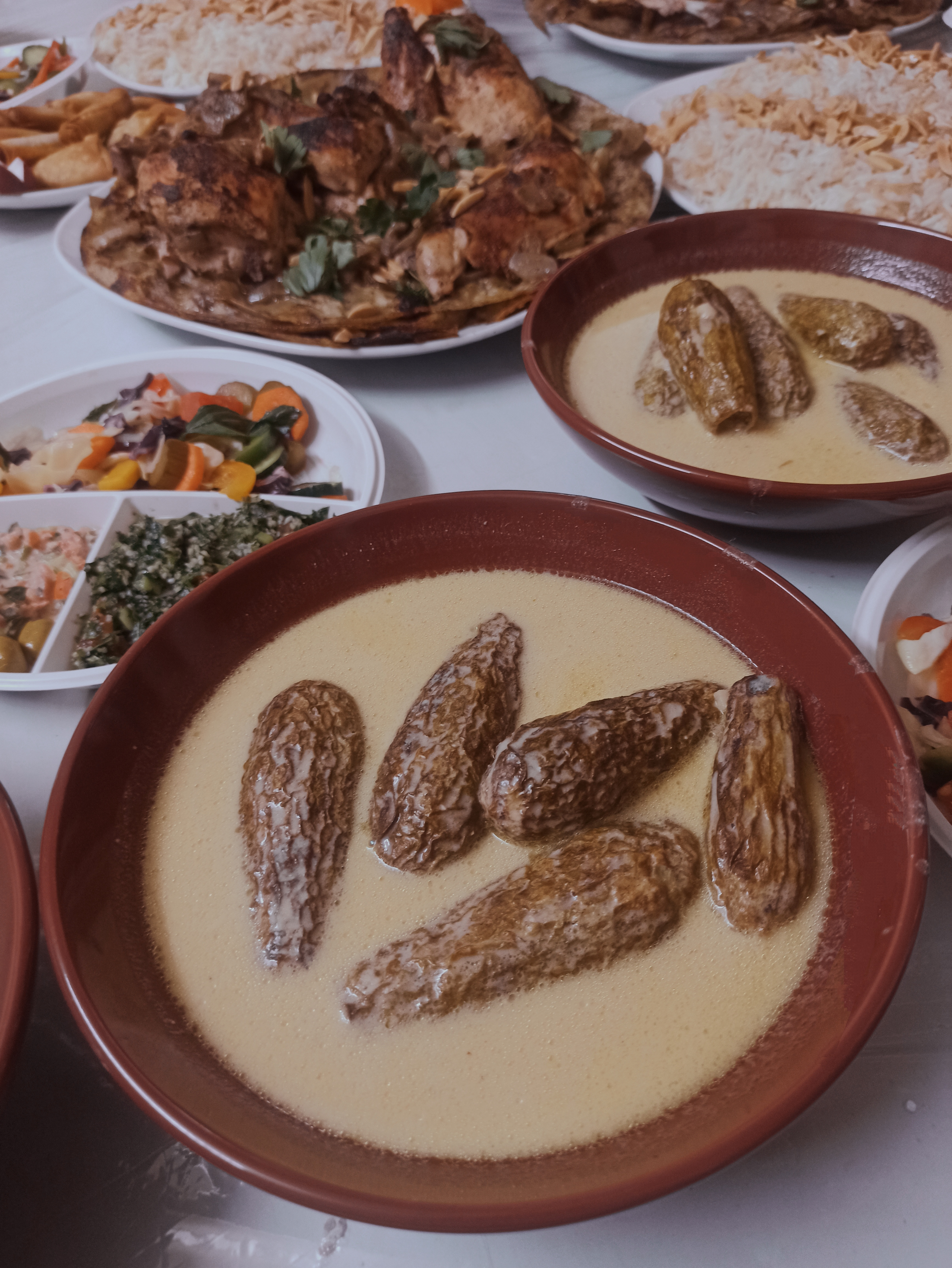
- Type: mahashi (stuffed vegetables)
- Region or state: Syria
- Main ingredients: zucchini · minced meat · eggs · olive oil · onion · pine nuts · yogurt · starch (to thicken the yogurt sauce)
- Similar dishes: kousa mahshi

Sheikh al-mahshi (شيخ المحشي Arabic pronunciation: [ʃeːx.al.maħʃi] 'the Chief of fillings'), sheikh el mahshi or shexmahshi (Kurdish) is a popular dish in the Middle East consisting of zucchini stuffed with minced lamb meat and nuts, bathed in a yogurt sauce (original recipe) or tomato sauce (derivative recipes). Certain sources point to Syrian origin.

Due to its combination of flavors and laborious preparation, this is one of the most appreciated dishes in the Arab world. This esteem is reflected in its name: sheikh means 'chief', that is, it is considered a "sheikh's food". Unlike kusa mahshi, the filling completely dispenses with rice, and is instead filled with more luxurious ingredients: meat and pine nuts. This dish requires a lot of elaboration, which is why it is considered an honor for guests when it is served in a house.

Popular legend has it that this dish was found in Syria and the dish spread throughout the Middle East, the Arabs gradually replaced the vegetable filling with meat and onion. zucchini is more commonly used in Iraq, Syria, Palestine, Jordan, Egypt and the Gulf countries, while in Lebanon eggplants are preferred.

== Preparation ==
In general, small vegetables are used, since large ones are difficult to seed, and require a lot of stuffing. If only large ones are available, it is better to cut them in half. Although less well known, there are also recipes that use tomatoes.

The filling begins by lightly toasting the almonds or pine nuts. In addition, a chopped onion is cooked over low heat. Then the minced meat is added and seasoned with the spices to suit each home: cinnamon, black pepper, etc. and salt. Finally, the meat is mixed with the dried fruit.

In the Middle East there is a specific kitchen utensil for emptying vegetables, called in Arabic حفارات الكوسا (hafārat kūsā) o معورة كوسا (maʿwarat kūsā) and "sacacorazones" in Spanish. With another utensil there is a risk of breaking the skin of the vegetable and therefore making it unusable.

Once all the zucchini have been emptied, they are stuffed. Finally, the zucchini are lightly browned in samneh.

For the yogurt sauce, flour should be mixed with strained yogurt and water, and heated in the pot without stopping stirring, which is difficult. First-time cooks are advised to add egg or an egg-flour mixture to help stabilize the sauce and keep it from splitting. Starch can also be used to thicken it. Finally, the stuffed zucchini are placed in the yogurt sauce and cooked. The dish is commonly served with rice.

Variants

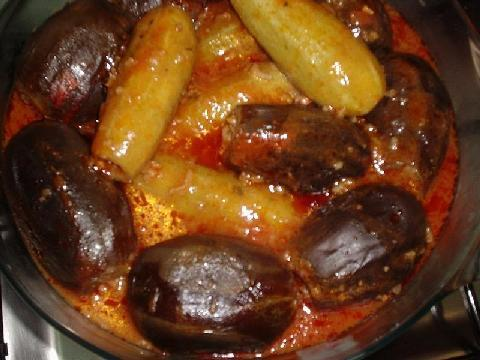
Sheikh al-mahshi of zucchini and aubergines in tomato sauce

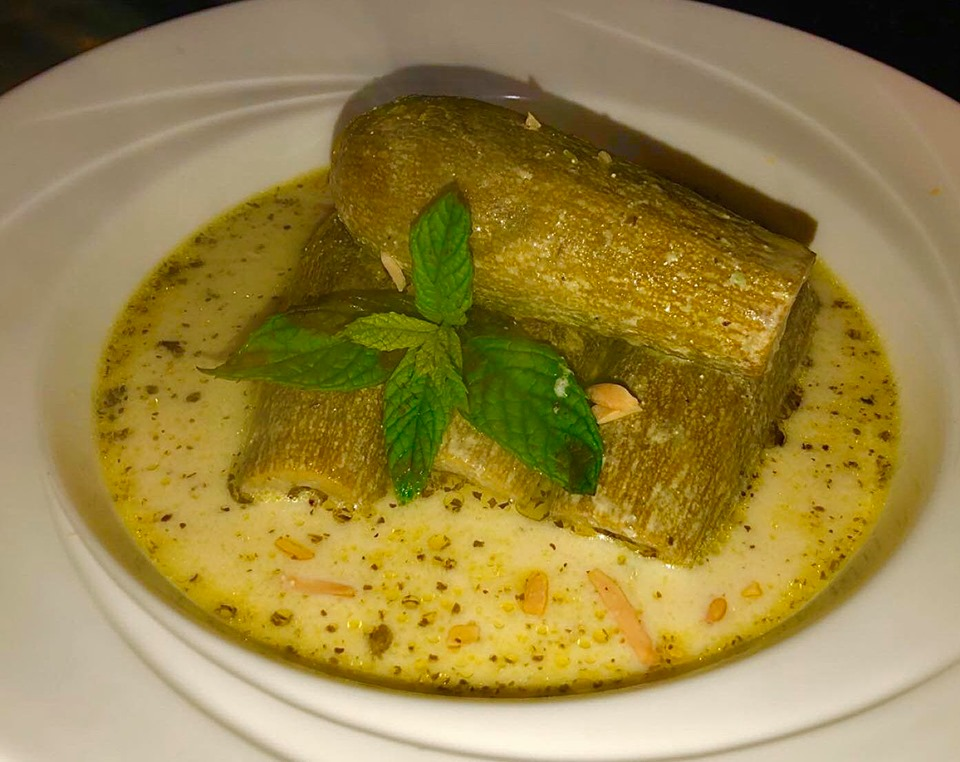
Sheikh al-mahshi of zucchini in yogurt sauce

== Variations ==
In Hebron, in the West Bank, the yogurt sauce is made with jameed.

== See also ==
- Makdūs, candied and stuffed aubergines
- Mahashi, Arabic stuffed vegetables
