= Jibneh Arabieh =

Middle Eastern cheese

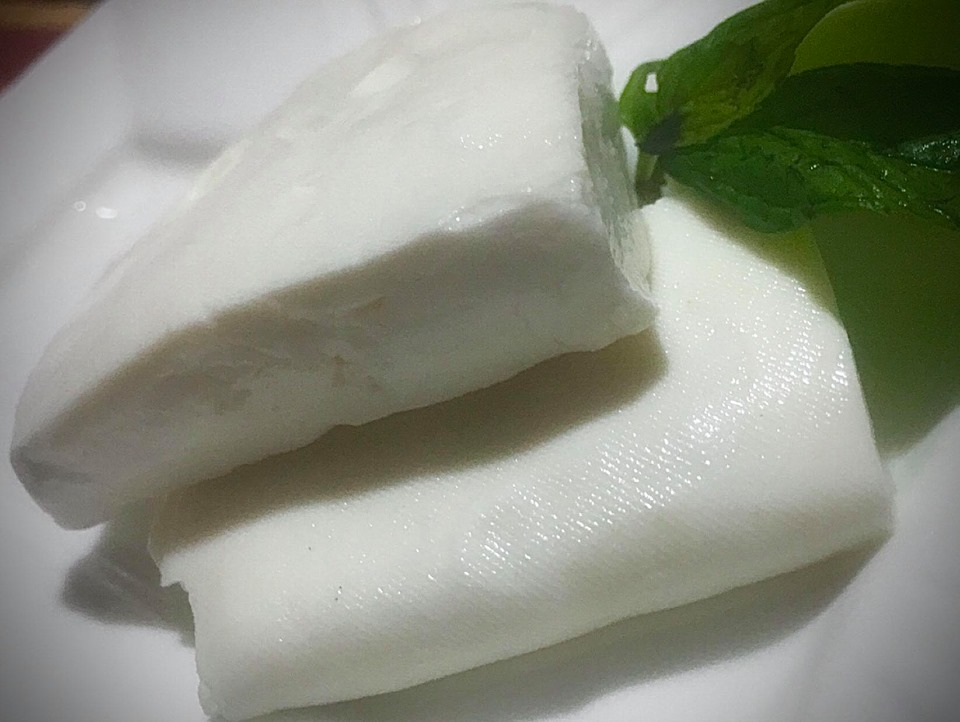

Jibneh Arabieh (Arabic: جبنة عربية; also jibni) is a soft white cheese found all over the Middle East. It is particularly popular in the Persian Gulf region. The cheese has a mild taste similar to feta but less salty. The heritage of the product started with Bedouins using goat or sheep milk; however, current practice is to use cow's milk to make the cheese. Jibneh Arabieh is used for cooking, or simply as a table cheese.

Jibni is an ingredient in cheese-filled pastries such as knafeh.

== See also ==
- Akkawi cheese
- Nabulsi cheese
- List of cheeses
