= Kibbeh safarjaliyeh =

Syrian dish

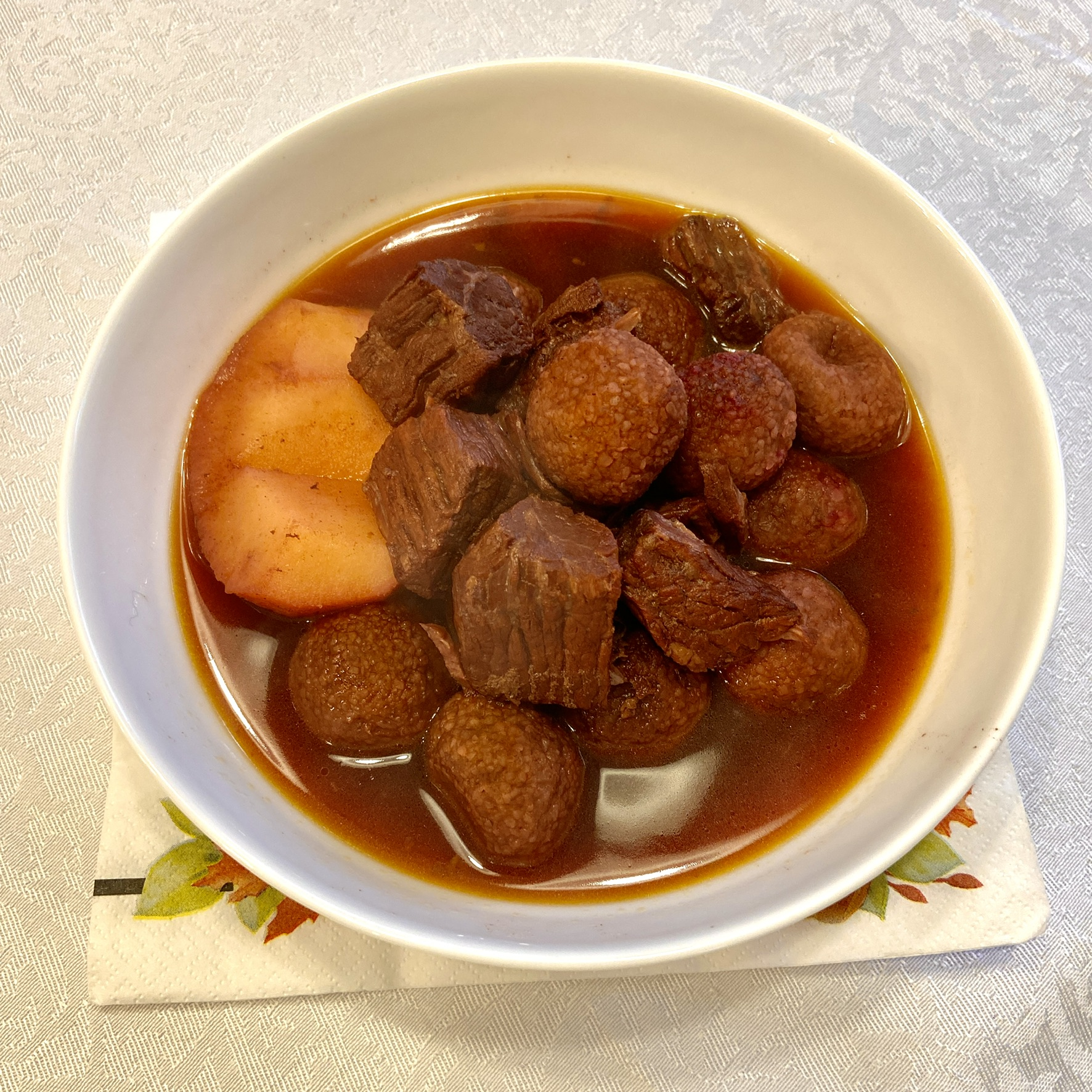
A bowl of kibbeh safarjaliyeh made with beef.

Kibbeh safarjaliyeh (Arabic: كبة سفرجلية) or kibbeh bi'safarjaliyeh (sometimes kubbah) is a dish of Syrian cuisine that consists of lamb or beef chunks as well as kibbeh in safarjaliyeh, a broth consisting of quince, pomegranate juice, pomegranate molasses, and beef broth. Kibbeh safarjaliyeh is a variation of the common Levantine dish, kibbeh, which it includes as an essential ingredient.

== Place of occurrence ==
Kibbeh safarjaliyeh is an authentic Aleppine dish. The city is known for its many variations of kibbeh with this and others mixing sour with savory flavors. It is thought that there are dozens of variations from the city. While many of these variations have spread across the Levant, safarjaliyeh seems to have remained largely local to Aleppo.

== Preparation and use ==
It is made by pounding bulgur wheat with ground meat into a paste and forming it into balls stuffed with butter and spices. The kibbeh is boiled before being simmered in the beef broth with the pomegranate juice, meat, and quince. Typically, the dish is served warm as an appetizer or first course. It also is primarily served in the fall and winter due to quince being in season and the dish's inherent warmth.

== Etymology ==
Safarjal (سفرجل) is the Arabic word for quince, the golden yellow pome fruit integral to the dish. Thus, safarjaliyeh is derived from it.

== See also ==
- Kibbeh nayyeh
- Cherry kebab
