= Smen =

Salted, fermented butter used in Middle Eastern and North African cuisine

Samneh/smen
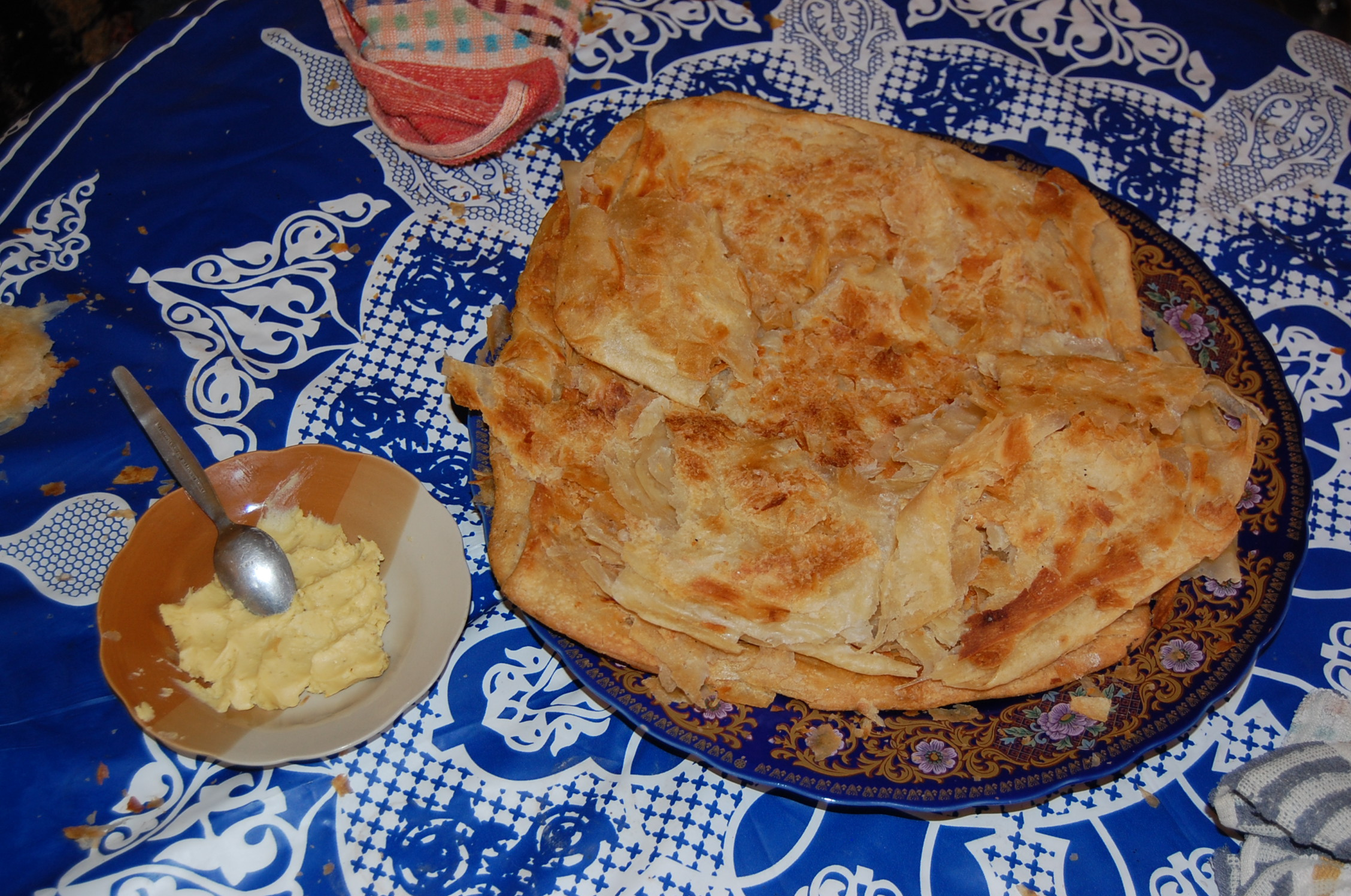
- Maghrebi smen (left) with msemmen (right)
- Type: Butter
- Region or state: Arab world
- Associated cuisine: Arab cuisine
- Main ingredients: Butter
- Variations: Fermented, smoked
- Similar dishes: Ghee

Smen (from Arabic: سمن, romanized: samn, or سمنة, samna; also called sman, semn, semneh, samneh, or sminn) is a salted, fermented butter native to North African cuisine (Algerian, Moroccan and Tunisian), as well as a traditional Yemeni dish. In countries like Jordan and Lebanon, samneh is a type of butter similar to clarified butter, while north African smen is a type of fermented butter similar to ghee.

Smen is an important ingredient in North African and Middle Eastern cuisine. It is produced using butter made from the milk of sheep, goats or a combination of the two. The butter is brought to its boiling point, then skimmed, then strained into a ceramic jar, and salted before it curdles. Some add roasted fenugreek seeds to the boiling butter, after which it is strained from the fenugreek seeds. Thyme is often added to provide a yeast and enzyme starter. Other plants or fruits can be used. The result is then aged, often in sealed containers. It is then traditionally buried in the ground for temperature stability purposes, in the same way that cheese is left to mature in caves because they have cooler and more stable temperatures.

It is similar to ghee, clarified butter, and niter kibbeh. Middle Eastern samneh is typically cooked for longer than clarified butter to further remove water and solids and thus extend its shelf life.

== Etymology ==
The Arabic samn is likely derived from the Semitic root *šamn. An 1890 Ottoman Turkish to English dictionary by British lexicographer James Redhouse described semn as "clarified butter" or "ghee".

== History ==
According to food historian Nawal Nasrallah, the practice of clarifying butter as a method of preservation dates back to ancient Mesopotamia

== Regional customs ==
=== Levant and Egypt ===
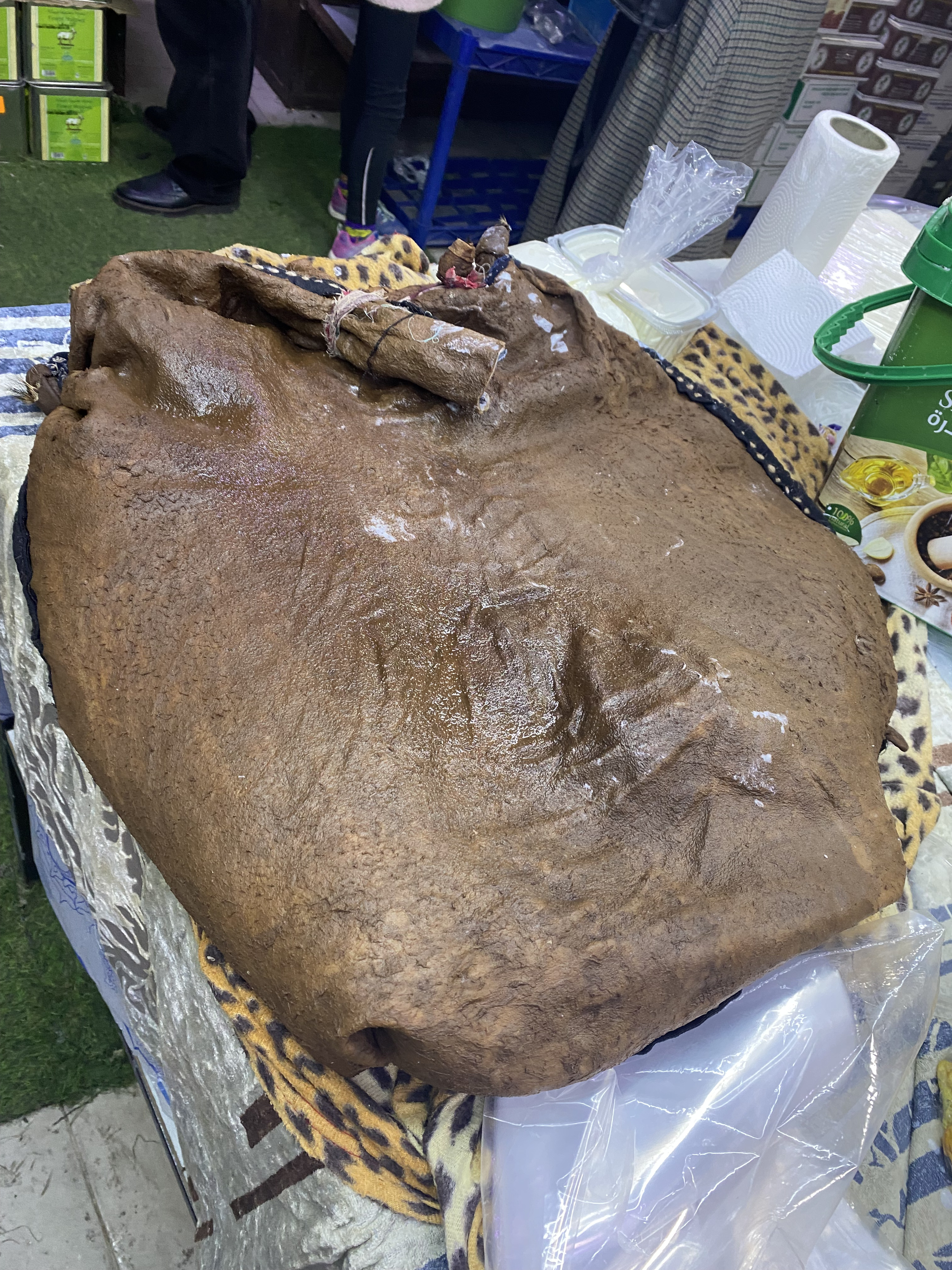
Leather bag used for making samneh baladi, Jordan

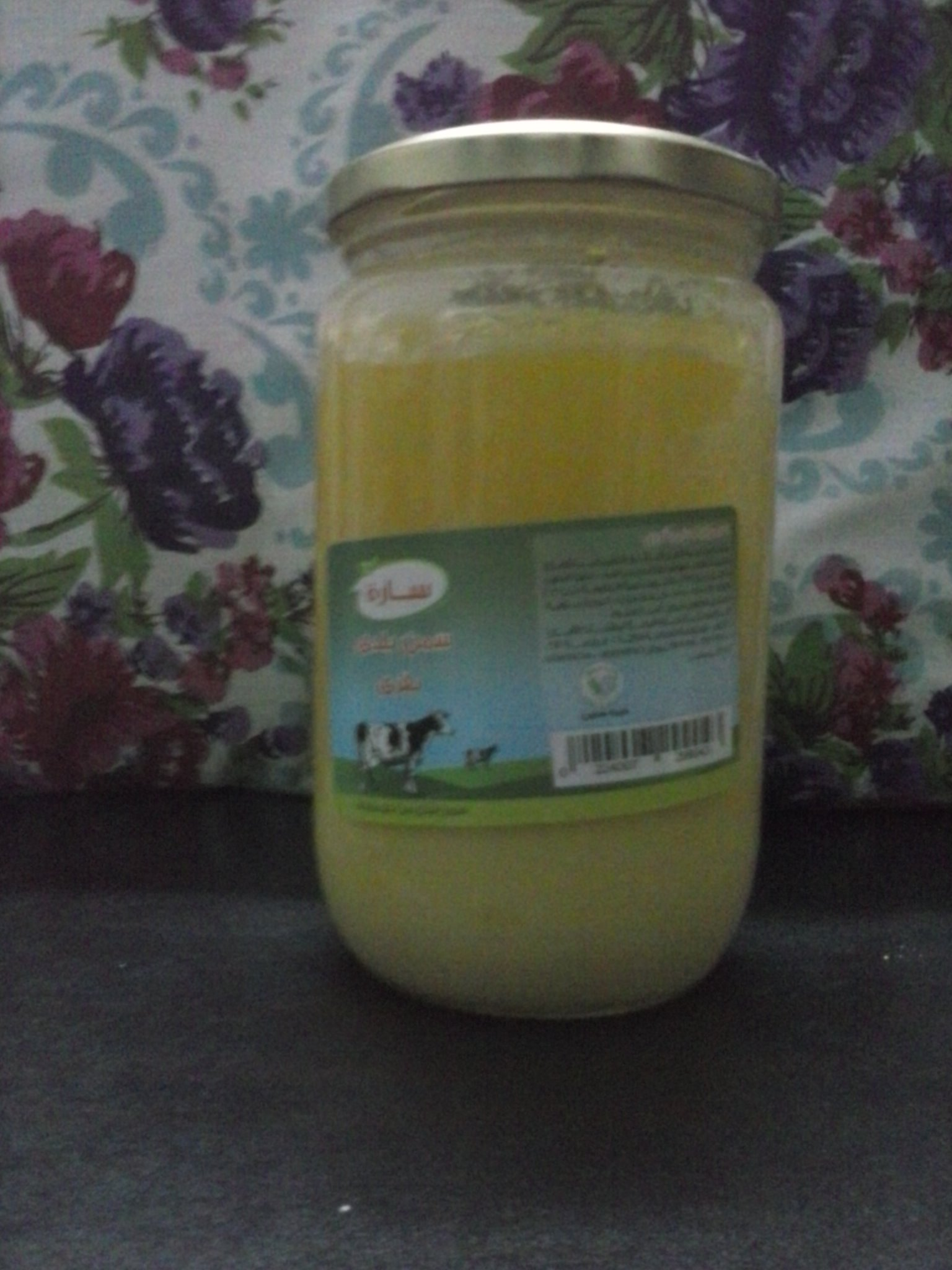
Jar of Egyptian samneh, made from cow milk

Spice blends like hwajeh (حواجة) are a traditional component in Jordanian samneh, Melilotus is a major component in these blends. In Jordan and Palestine, butter is often gently simmered with bulgur, which absorbs remaining milk residues, before being strained to produce samneh, also called samneh baladieh.

In Egypt and Syria, samneh is traditionally prepared using a leather bag.

Samneh baladieh is a core component of many sweets, like baklava and knafeh.

=== Maghreb ===
Moroccan smen is traditionally aged after it has been prepared and spiced, undergoing fermentation as it ages until it acquires a pungent odour rather like that of blue cheese. A 2022 survey in northern Morocco found that smen is used as traditional medicine for a number of ailments, with this knowledge transmitted orally across generations. A similar fermented butter is also made in Tunisia. Matured smen is very similar in taste to blue cheese as it is a high-fat form of cheese. The older the smen, the stronger—and more valued—it becomes.

The milks used are traditionally cow, goat, ewe, or a mixture.

According to popular legend, Berber farmers in southern Morocco will sometimes bury a sealed vessel of smen on the day of a daughter's birth, aging it until it is unearthed and used to season the food served at that daughter's wedding.

=== Yemen ===
In Yemen, the local custom was to take fresh butter and to add thereto hot water while the milk or whey was still mixed with the butter. This mixture is then taken up and put into a separate vessel where it is then brought to a boil. Immediately thereafter, they take either wheat flour or roasted and ground fenugreek seeds mixed with roasted wheat kernels, and cook them together on a low heat. Allowed to simmer. Afterwards, the butter is then strained until one is left with a clear batch of melted butter (smen). The smen is then stored in a smoked earthenware container in a cool place.

Yemenis prepare a special version of semneh (سمنة) which is smoked with aromatic herbs inside of a gourd in order to impart deeper flavour and aid in preservation. Yemeni samneh is used to make a dish called fatoot samneh.

== See also ==
- Bog butter
- Clarified butter
- Dairy product
- List of African dishes
