= Queso frito =

Fried cheese dish

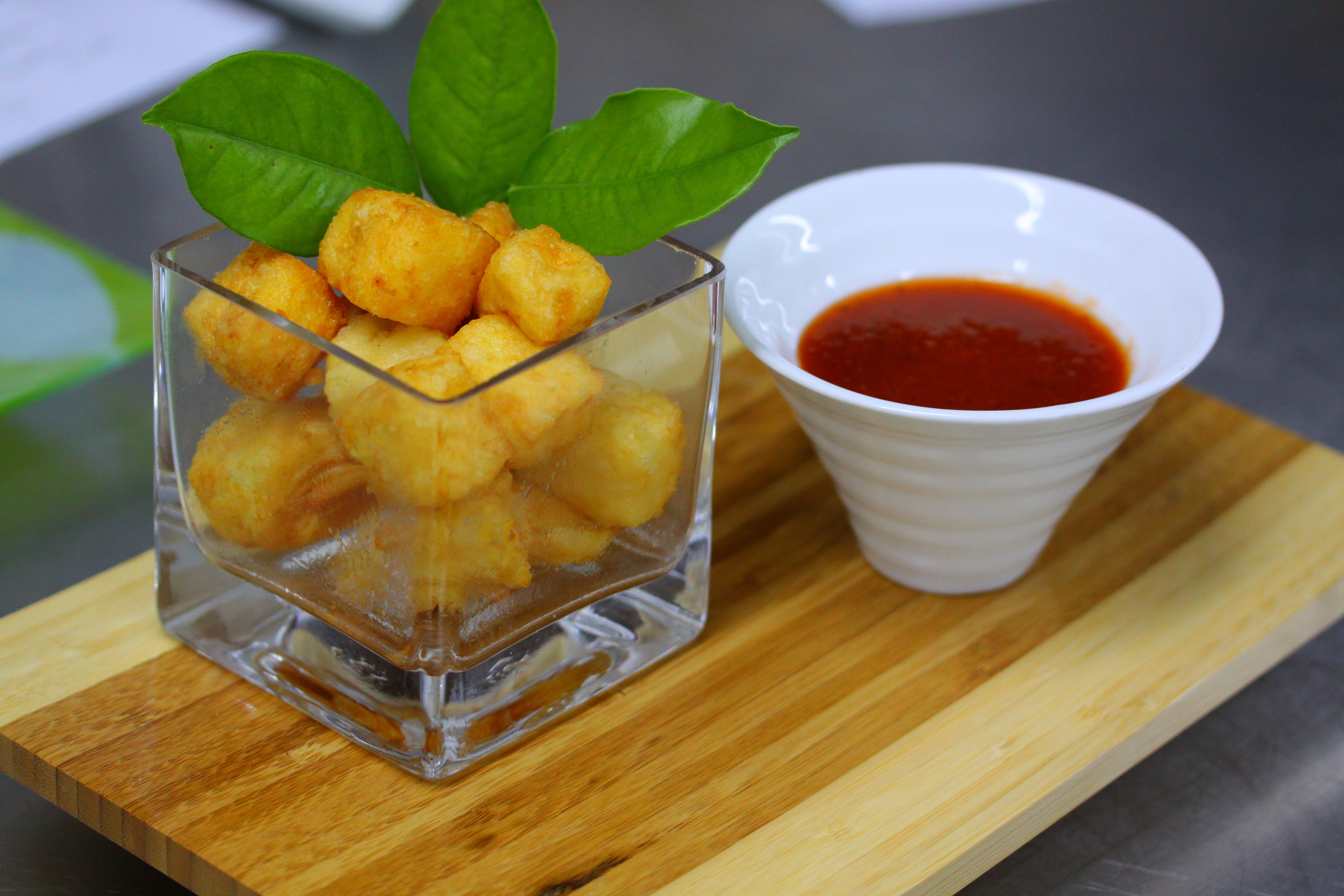
Queso frito with tomato jam

Queso frito (English: 'fried cheese') is a fried cheese dish. It consists of a white, salty cheese with a high melting point called queso de freír (Spanish for 'frying cheese'), queso paisa, or queso fresco (fresh cheese') or queso blanco (white cheese). Queso frito is made throughout Latin America.
