= Balady =

Balady or Baladi (بلدي) is an Arabic word meaning "native" or "local." It may refer to:

- Eish baladi, rustic Egyptian flatbread similar to pita
- Baladi cheese, a Middle Eastern feta
- Balady citron, a variety of citron in Israel and Palestine
- Baladi music, a form of urban Egyptian dance music
- Baladi, a group of Yemenite Jews
- Beledi, also called "baladi", a duple meter used in Arabic music; and also rustic or folk tradition music
- Baladi (grape), a variety of grape used for Spanish wine
- Salata baladi, an Egyptian salad

== See also ==
- Bilady (disambiguation)
