= Bilady =

Bilady (Arabic: بلادي, romanized: Bilādī), alternatively romanized as Biladi or Beladi, may refer to:

- "Biladi, Biladi, Biladi", the current national anthem of Egypt
- "Ishi Biladi", the national anthem of the United Arab Emirates

== See also ==
- Balady (disambiguation)
