= Cherry kebab =

Kebab made with minced lamb and cherry

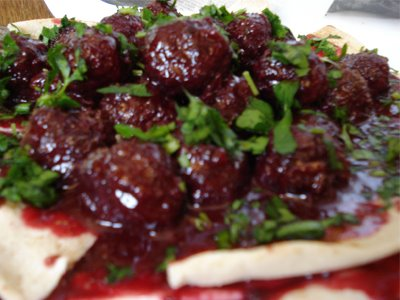
Cherry kebab

Cherry kebab (Arabic: كَباب كَرَز, romanized: kabāb karaz) is a special kind of kebab from Aleppo, Syria. It is made with minced lamb and cherry.

== Preparation ==
Cherry kebab is a stew-like preparation. The specific of this dish is that the true version of cherry kebab requires the use of St. Lucie cherries. St. Lucie cherry (Prunus cerasus) is a small (8–10mm long), ovoid, bitter, crimson-colored cherry, smaller than its sweet counterpart. It comes in several varieties, including Aleppo, Montmorency, and Morello. Because it is sweet and sour at the same time, it perfectly blends with the richness of the lamb. Cherries give a beautiful bright purplish magenta color for this dish.

== See also ==
- Kibbeh safarjaliyeh
- Kibbeh nayyeh
