= Stuffed squash =

Dish common in Egypt and the former Ottoman domain

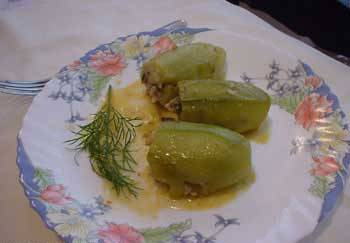
- Stuffed squash
- Alternative names: Stuffed zucchini
- Type: Dolma
- Course: Main course
- Region or state: The Balkans, Egypt, Turkey, and the Levant
- Associated cuisine: Egyptian, Levantine, Turkish, Greek cuisine, Macedonian cuisine, Albanian, Montenegrin, Bosnian, Croatian, Serbian, Bulgarian, Hungarian, Romanian, Moldovan
- Serving temperature: Hot
- Main ingredients: Summer squashes, minced meat, rice
- Ingredients generally used: onions, spices, tomato sauce
- Similar dishes: Stuffed peppers

Stuffed squash, courgette, marrow, zucchini or mahshi kusa is a dish common in Egypt, the Levant and the Balkans. It is a kind of dolma consisting of various kinds of squash or zucchini, stuffed with rice and sometimes meat, and cooked on the stovetop or in the oven. The meat version is served hot, as a main course. The meatless version is considered an "olive-oil dish" and is often eaten at room temperature or warm.

== Preparation ==
Töltött tök prepared for cooking

The placenta and seeds of larger, shorter, cylindrical immature squashes are pulled off, and the further proceeding is similar as for punjene paprike or sarma. Often, punjene tikvice (stuffed squashes) and punjene paprike (stuffed peppers) are made together, as a mixed dish.

== Name ==
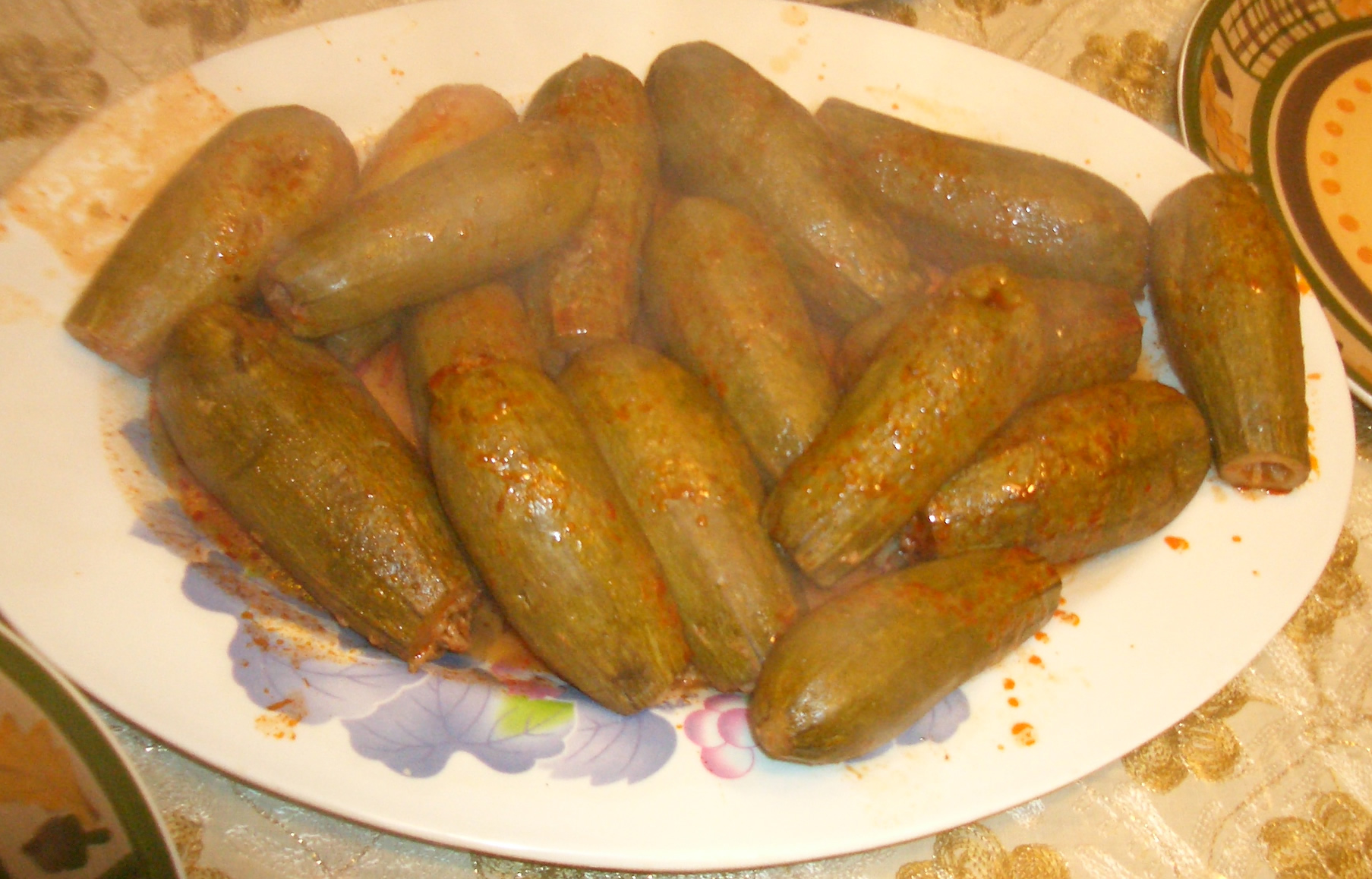
Kousa mahshi, stuffed zucchini

== Variants ==
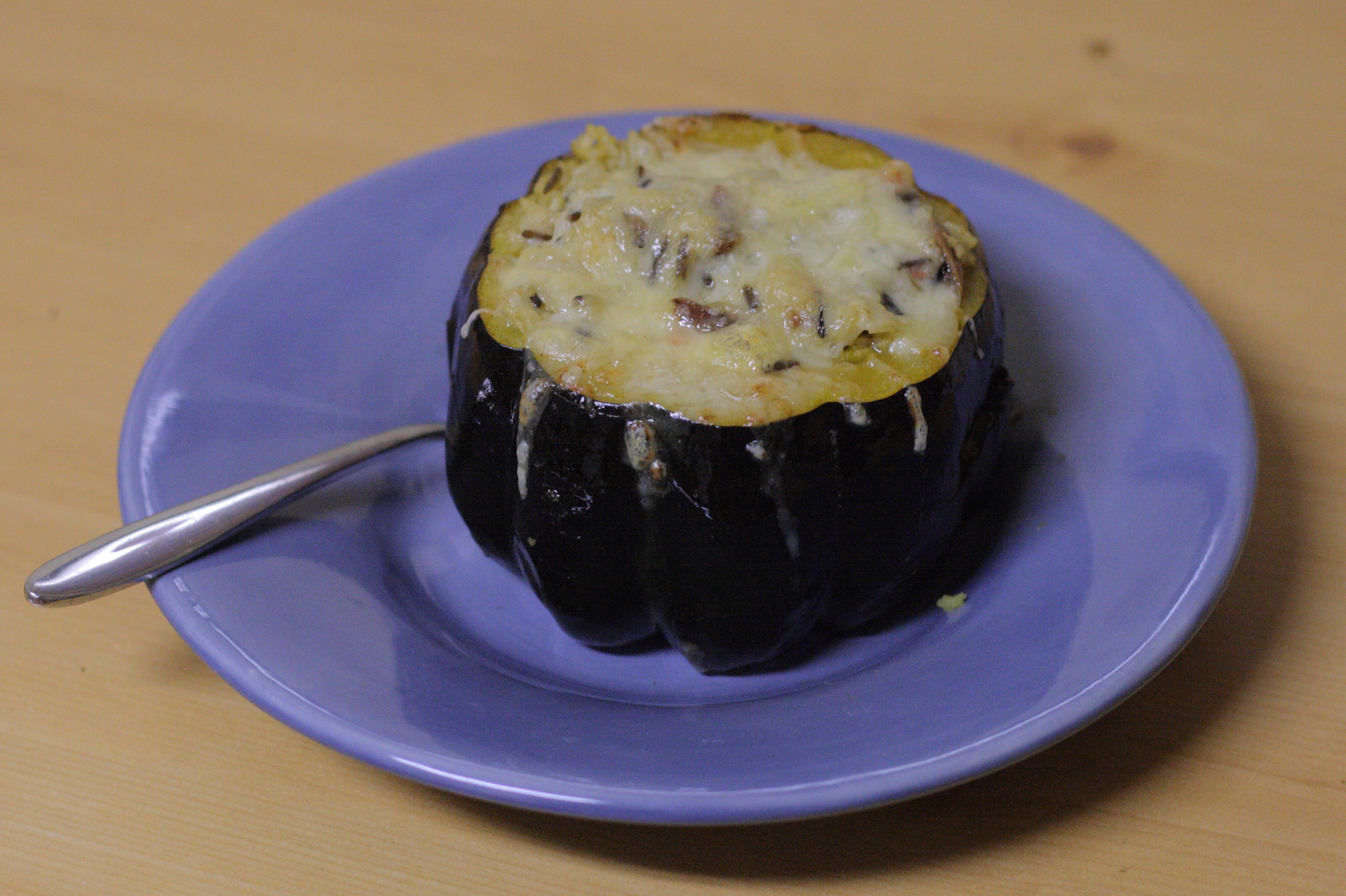
An acorn squash stuffed with pilaf and topped with cheese

The name in different languages generally means literally "stuffed squash" eg. punjene tikvice in Serbo-Croatian.

=== Egypt ===
Mahshi kosa (Egyptian Arabic: محشي كوسا) is a traditional stuffed squash dish eaten in Egypt, it is a type of dolma consisting of squash that is cored and stuffed with a seasoned filling of rice and herbs. The stuffing typically includes short-grain rice mixed with parsley, dill, and cilantro, flavored with cumin, coriander, salt, and black pepper. The squash are then gently simmered in a spiced tomato sauce, allowing the rice to absorb the liquid while the zucchini becomes tender.

=== Levant ===
In the Levant, this dish is flavoured with mint and garlic. In Cyprus, the flowers of the marrow are also stuffed.

The cultivar is called 'Cousa' in Robinson and Decker-Walters (1997) p. 77: "Some summer squash cultivars, e.g. the vegetable marrows (Cucurbita pepo) are consumed when almost mature. In the Middle East, nearly mature fruits of 'Cousa' are stuffed with meat and other ingredients, then baked".

=== Turkey ===
In traditional Turkish cuisine, stuffed zucchini (Turkish: kabak dolması) commonly contains ground beef in addition to rice and sometimes vegetables, herbs and spices. It is often served with both yogurt and a tomato-based sauce.

=== Bulgaria ===
In Bulgaria, the dish is commonly known as пълнени тиквички (palneni tikvichki), which can refer to stuffed squash or stuffed courgettes.

=== Hungary ===
In Hungarian cuisine, stuffed squash is commonly known as töltött tök. It is typically stuffed with ground meat, rice, vegetables, herbs and spices. Stuffed courgettes are commonly known as töltött cukkini.

== See also ==
- List of squash and pumpkin dishes
- List of stuffed dishes
- Sheikh al-mahshi, zucchini stuffed with minced lamb meat and pine nuts in yogurt sauce
