= Baladi cheese =

Mediterranean cheese

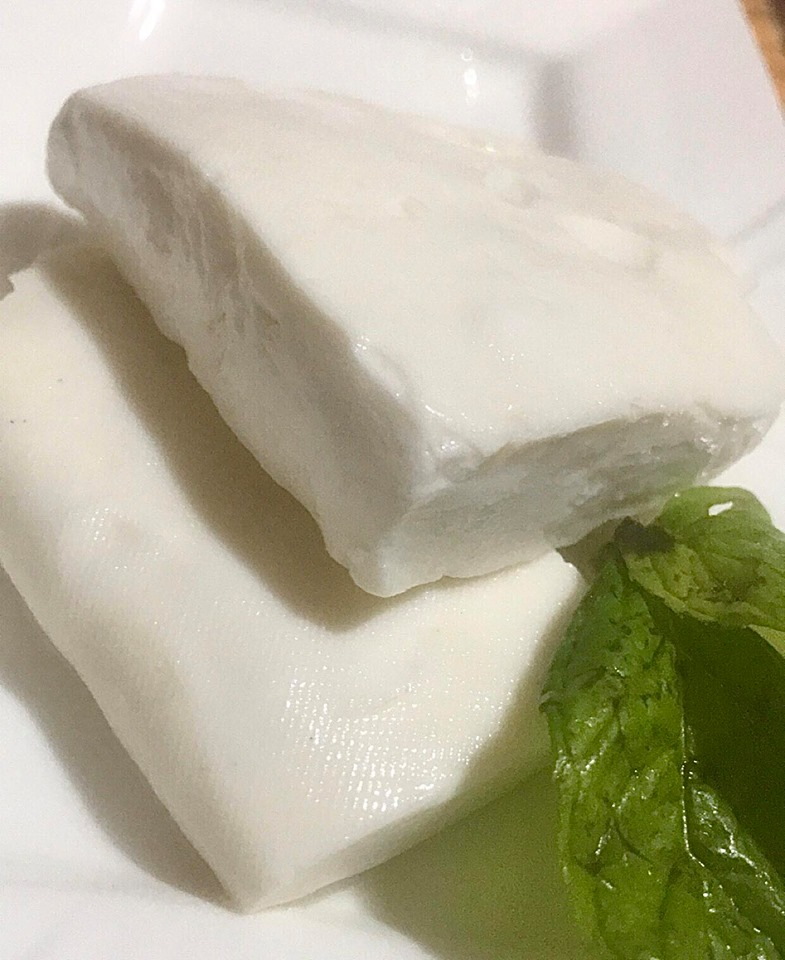
- Region: Arab world
- Source of milk: sheep, goat
- Pasteurised: No
- Texture: soft

A dish topped with baladi cheese

Baladi cheese (Arabic: جبنة بلدي, romanized: jibnah baladī or جبنة بلدية) is a soft, white cheese originating in the Middle East. It has a mild yet rich flavor.

== About ==
Baladi has the same size and shape as Syrian cheese with markings from the draining basket or hoop which leave a design patterned on its outer surface. It is slightly higher in fat than Syrian and its texture is softer, creamier and less chewy. It is also rindless.

== Name ==
Baladi is made using milk from baladi goats. The word baladi means "village" or "country". Baladi is also called the "cheese of the mountains" or "mountain cheese" since it is made among high mountains by shepherds in Lebanon.

It sometimes referred to as "green cheese" (Arabic: جبنة خضراء, romanized: Jibneh Khadra), typically in reference to the unprocessed cheese made in Lebanon.

== Ingredients ==
Baladi is a fresh, traditionally unpasteurized, and uncultured cheese made with a mixture of goat, cow and sheep's milk. The diverse microflora, high moisture, uncultured, and unpasteurized nature tends to limit the shelf life to 3 days.

Cultures similar to ones used for preparing yogurt can be added. Rennet is added during the preparation in powder or tablet form.

After the cheese is prepared, it is submerged in brine and then taken out of the brine quickly and marketed for sale. It is sometimes shaped into balls less than 10cm in diameter before being stored.

The unpasteurized sheep milk might lead to infections, so it is sometimes tested for Brucella and pasteurized, some industrial dairy plants produce the cheese and keep well controlled sanitary conditions.

== See also ==
- Akkawi
- Feta
- List of cheeses
- Nabulsi cheese
