= Nabulsi cheese =

Palestinian sheep and goat cheese

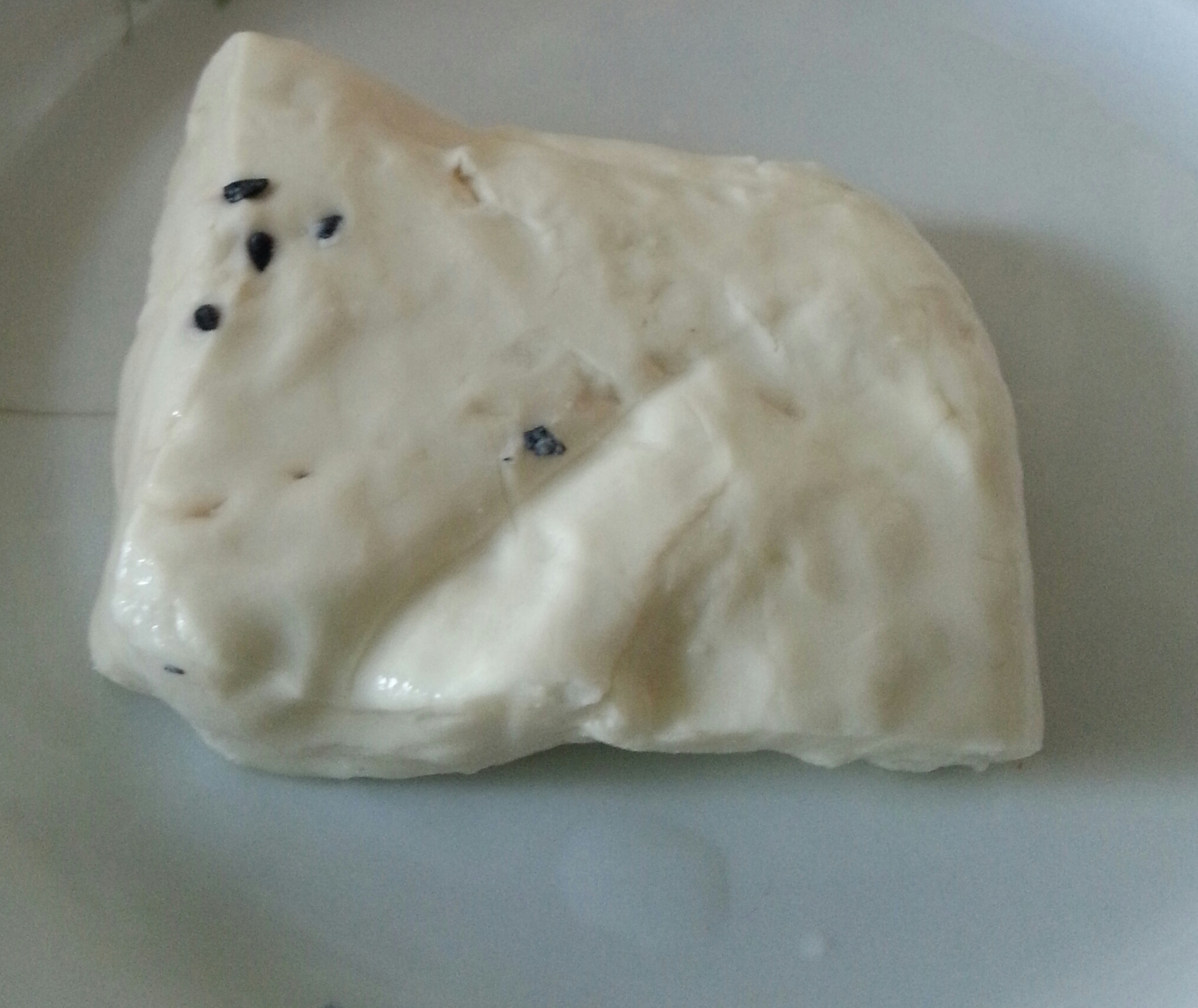
- A block of Nabulsi cheese; nigella sativa seeds are mixed into the cheese
- Region: West Bank
- Town: Nablus
- Source of milk: Cow, sheep, goat
- Texture: Semi-hard, elastic when heated, brittle when dry
- Named after: City of Nablus

Nabulsi is a Palestinian white brined cheese made in the Middle East. Its name refers to its place of origin, Nablus, and it is known throughout the West Bank and surrounding regions. Nabulsi, along with Akkawi cheese, is one of the principal cheeses consumed in Jordan. It is produced primarily from sheep's milk; alternatively, goat's milk may be used. Nabulsi cheese is white and rectangular in shape. It is semi-hard with no gas holes. It becomes soft and elastic when heated. It is a typical ewe's or goat's milk cheese, but is traditionally flavored with mahleb (Prunus mahaleb) and mastic (Pistacia lentiscus) added to the boiling brine. It is a major ingredient of the Middle Eastern dessert knafeh.

== Production ==
The cheese can be prepared using cow, sheep or goat milk, or a mixture of cow and sheep milk to create mashmouleh (Arabic: مشمولة) cheese.

The cheese is first prepared by heating the milk and then adding rennet, after the milk coagulates, the curds are pressed, cooled, cut, then boiled, and finally stored in brine.

The cheese is traditionally flavored by adding mastic gum and mahaleb to the brine. It is typically made during spring, when pastures are green.

== Consumption ==
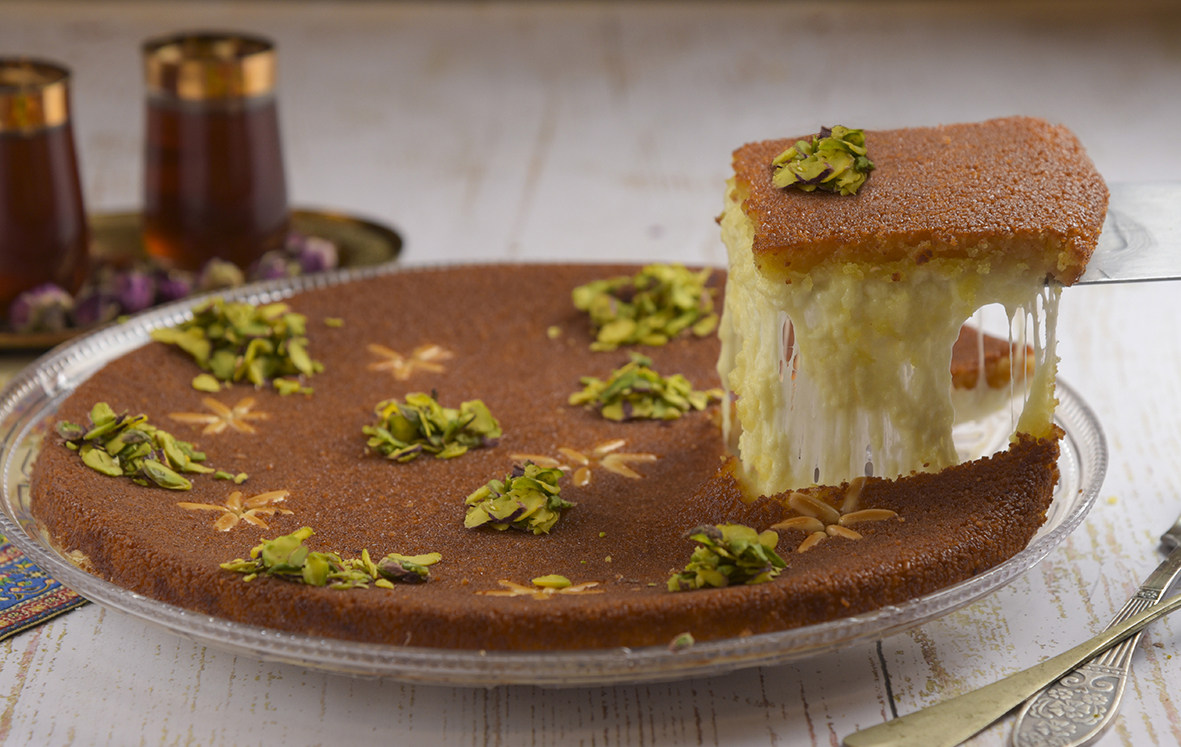
Soft Knafeh with Nabulsi cheese filling

The cheese is widely used in the middle east and Southeast Europe. It is used in both sweet and savory dishes.

After the cheese is prepared, it is stored in brine. It may be later desalted for use in the production of bakery goods and desserts such as knafeh, where the stretchability of the cheese is desired. Additionally, it may be eaten fresh, or fried in olive oil.

To desalt the cheese, it is soaked in fresh water—often refrigerated—for several hours or overnight, which helps reduce its saltiness before consumption.

In regions where Nabulsi cheese is not readily available, some recipes will substitute it for mozzarella and/or ricotta, sometimes combined with other softer cheeses. This aims to replicate the texture of heated Nabulsi cheese.

=== Health concerns ===
The high salt content of brined Nabulsi cheese may lead people with issues like hypertension or kidney stone disease to avoid it. The salt content is intentionally increased by sellers to help preserve the cheese in storage, so it is recommended by the WHO to reduce the saltiness prior to consumption.

== See also ==
- Brined cheese – Cheese that is matured in brine
- List of cheeses
- Palestinian cuisine – Culinary traditions of Palestine
