= Akkawi =

Levantine white brine cheese

Akkawi cheese
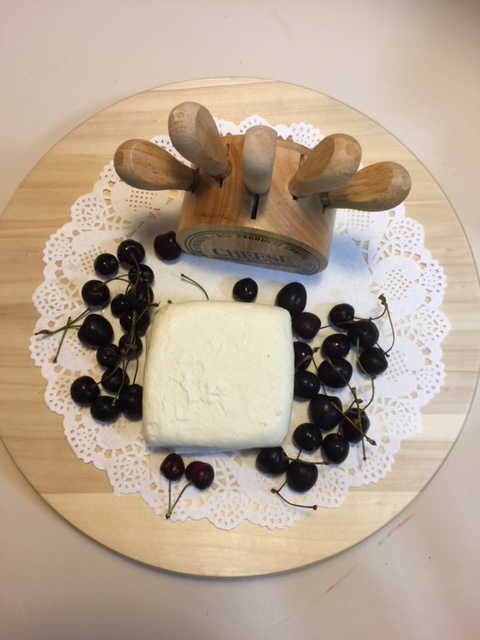
- Other names: Akawi; Akawieh; Ackawi
- Country of origin: Palestine
- Region: Levant
- Town: Acre
- Source of milk: Cow
- Texture: Semi-hard
- Named after: City of Acre

Akkawi cheese (Arabic: جبنة عكاوي, romanized: jubnat ʿakkāwī; also Akawi, Akawieh and Ackawi) is a white brine cheese from the Levant region, named after the Palestinian city of Acre (or Akka, present-day Israel).

== Etymology ==
Akkawi cheese is named after the port city of Acre (Arabic: عكّا, romanized: ʿAkkā). ʿAkkāwī (عكّاوي) is a nisba meaning "from Acre".

== History ==
Muslim scholar Ahmed Aref El-Zein's 1913 book The History of Sidon (تاريخ صيدا, Tārīkh Ṣaydā) contained a list of imported goods into Sidon, Lebanon, from 1907, which mentioned 1200 containers of "Akkawi cheese" (جبن عكاوي, jubn ʿakkāwī) being imported from the cities of Haifa and Acre.

== Production and storage ==
Akkawi is commonly made with pasteurized cow's milk, but can also be made with goat or sheep milk. This cheese is largely produced in the Middle East, notably in Israel, Palestine, Lebanon, Jordan, Syria, Egypt, and Cyprus. In these regions, people usually eat it with a soft flatbread during lunch and dinner. Akkawi is hand-packed into square draining hoops and then cured in a salted whey brine for two days.

Akkawi is produced by heating milk to 35-40 Celsius, adding rennet, then leaving it to curdle for around an hour, after which the whey is squeezed out through a cheesecloth to drain the cheese.

== Texture and taste ==
The color is white and it has a smooth texture and a mild salty taste. It is commonly used as a table cheese eaten by itself or paired with fruit.

The texture can be compared to mozzarella, feta or a mizithra, since it does not melt easily. Akkawi can be stored up to a year. The texture and flavor is a result of its specific culturing from its curds that are kept together for a prolonged period longer than simpler tasting curd cheese such as Syrian cheese when akkawi is transformed into cheese.

== Supply chain problems ==
The supply of akkawi has often been a problem in the Middle East. During the Lebanese Civil War, dairy animals were slaughtered and the country had to import akkawi from Eastern Europe. In Los Angeles, people used to make a substitute for akkawi by soaking feta cheese in several changes of water to desalinate it.

== See also ==
- Brined cheese – Cheese that is matured in brine
- List of cheeses
- List of stretch-curd cheeses – Cheeses prepared using the pasta filata technique
