= Assyrian cuisine =

Culinary traditions of the Assyrian people

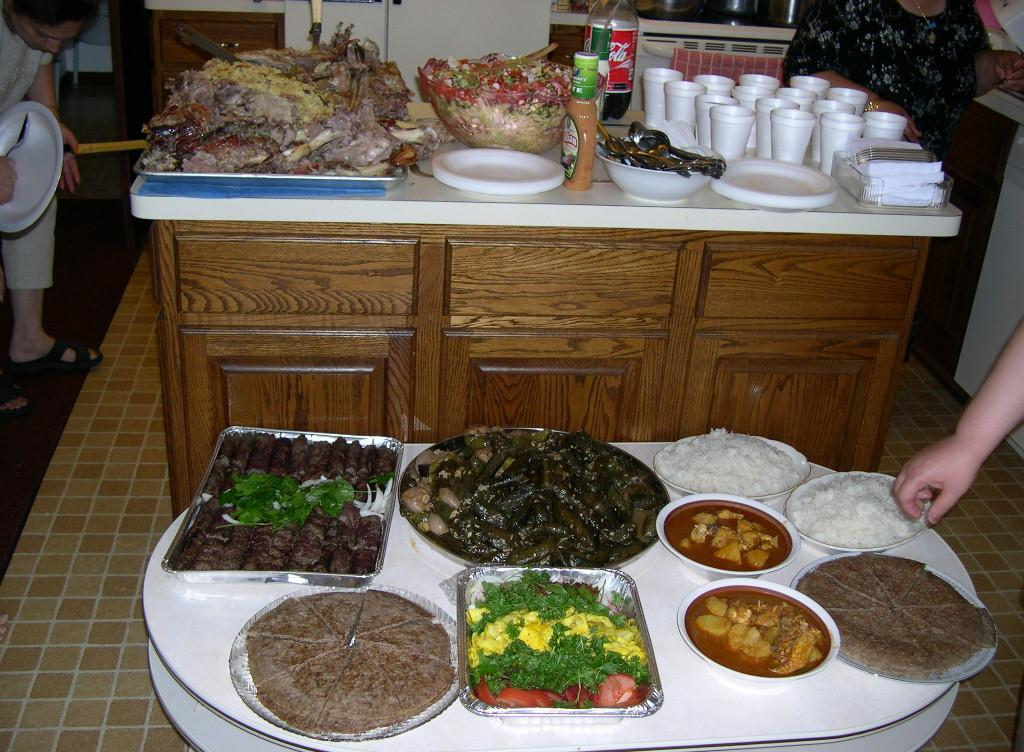
Typical Assyrian cuisine

Assyrian cuisine is the cuisine of the indigenous Assyrian people, Eastern Aramaic-speaking Syriac Christians of Iraq, northeastern Syria, northwestern Iran and southeastern Turkey. Assyrian cuisine is primarily identical to Iraqi/Mesopotamian cuisine, as well as being very similar to other Middle Eastern and Caucasian cuisines, as well as Greek cuisine, Levantine cuisine, Turkish cuisine, Iranian cuisine, Palestinian cuisine, and Armenian cuisine, with most dishes being similar to the cuisines of the area in which those Assyrians live/originate from. It is rich in grains such as barley, meat, tomato, herbs, spices, and potato as well as fermented dairy products, and pickles.

== Lunch and dinner ==
There is no difference between lunch and dinner to Assyrians as there are with some other cultures. They are referred to as kawitrā w kharamsha, or ˁurāytā w ḥšāmtā (ܚܕܝܐ ܘ ܥܫܝܐ). Lunch and dinner typically consist of basmati rice, which can be prepared either plain, red (smooqah), yellow (shaootah), or plain with fried miniature noodles called sha'riya. Alternatively, there is also green rice (reza qeena), which is flavoured and seasoned with lima beans and dill, which give it a green colour. In place of rice, gurgur (burghul or "perda" in Assyrian) can be prepared in the same way as rice. Beef and chicken kebab, grilled on skewers or a spit, are also commonly eaten at mealtime.

Biryani is an Assyrian rice dish with sha'riya made of green peas, fried cubed potatoes, almonds, raisins, sliced hard boiled eggs, and chicken. Rezza smooqah (red rice) is often made with chicken or meat. Rice is usually accompanied with a stew, called shirwah(sometimes also called shorba), with a broth basis (prepared with tomato paste, water, and spices) and a main vegetable ingredient (potatoes, beans, okra, string beans, spinach, cauliflower, or zucchini). Beef, chicken, or ox tails can be added according to taste and availability. During Lent, meat is omitted for religious reasons. A traditional Assyrian salad is cubed tomatoes, cucumbers, peppers, and red onions made with a homemade dressing of lemon, vinegar, salt, pepper, and olive oil.

Other various types of Assyrian special dishes include thlokheh (lentils cooked with curry and sha'riya), kofta (kipteh, ground beef meatballs flavored with parsley, rice, onion, and spices in a tomato based stew), kuba hammouth (ground beef long meatballs with an outer cracked wheat shell, much similar to Syrian and Lebanese fried kibbeh), and girdo (or bushala) is a porridge made of rice and sour yoghurt, served with date or fig syrup.

Other traditional Assyrian specialities include tepsi (a casserole made in layers of fried potato, fried eggplant, fried green peppers, fried onions, meat, and tomatoes drenched in a tomato sauce and baked in the oven, not unlike the Levantine version of moussaka), shamakhshi (fried rolled eggplant stuffed with ground beef in tomato sauce), dolma (rice and tomato sauce stuffed in grape leaves, cabbage, various peppers, zucchini, and eggplant), masgouf (fish spiced with olive oil, salt, and turmeric, topped with tomatoes, potatoes, and onions, then oven-baked) and lahmacun (flatbread topped with ground beef, tomato paste, spices, and onions).

Sesame seeds are important to the cuisine and used to make tahini; an Assyrian folk tale tells of the gods drinking sesame wine on the night before they created the earth.

== Soups and stews ==
Boushala (or bushala) is one of the oldest known dishes; it is a yoghurt-based soup with assorted greens such as Swiss chard or spinach and bulgur wheat. This soup can be served hot or cold. Dikhwah (or dokhwa) is a dried yoghurt-based heavy stew with barley and meat.

Harissa (or hareesa) is a porridge made with hulled wheat berries, deboned chicken or beef, and broth, sometimes eaten with butter or cinnamon.

Tashrib (or tashreeb) is a soup made of chickpeas, onions, and chicken or lamb meat, often served on top of bread at breakfast. Tashrib is similar to a Syrian dish called fatta and an Iraqi dish called tashghib. There are variations of the dish that may include more toppings like lentils, noodles, and pomegranate.

Pacha, similar to Armenian and Turkish dishes, is a heavy stew consisting of lamb stomach stuffed with rice, brain, tongue, liver, or offal.

== Desserts ==
There are several different types of desserts such as cakes and cookies, which include baklava, kulecheh, kadeh, nazoochi, and others. Due to the influence from the post-Ottoman occupation of Iraq and Syria by the British and French many customs were picked up from the colonial administrators, tea and biscuits are often eaten as snacks.

Kadeh looks like a thick yellowish flat bread though it contains plenty of butter, eggs, and sugar which renders it a very sweet pastry. Kadeh are usually prepared alongside kulecheh and are served during Christmas. Nazoochi is similar to kadeh but sweeter and cut into a triangle shape; it is served during tea time or during social events.

== Beverages ==
Alcoholic beverages are consumed at different rates in the Assyrian community depending on geography. Arak is one of the most popular alcoholic beverages and can be distilled from grapes or dates. It is a strong alcohol so it is often served with food; it tastes like black liquorice and is clear until mixed with water, which then becomes milky-white. Assyrian rural communities have often traditionally brewed their own organic wheat beer and produced their own wine.

Daweh is a popular yogurt drink made with yogurt, water, salt, and sometimes mint. It is consumed during the summer when it is hot.

Black tea is almost always drunk in the morning with Assyrian breakfast. Assyrian tea is drunk with sugar and evaporated milk, as opposed to regular milk or cream. Dried lime tea, or chai noomi basra, an Arab herbal tea, may be consumed to treat upset stomachs and indigestion.

Traditional Assyrian coffee is made in a large bronze jezve (which is covered with Assyrian imagery) and is served sweetened, similar to Turkish coffee. Turkish coffee, which is a hold-over from Ottoman times, is often prepared the same way.

== Gallery ==
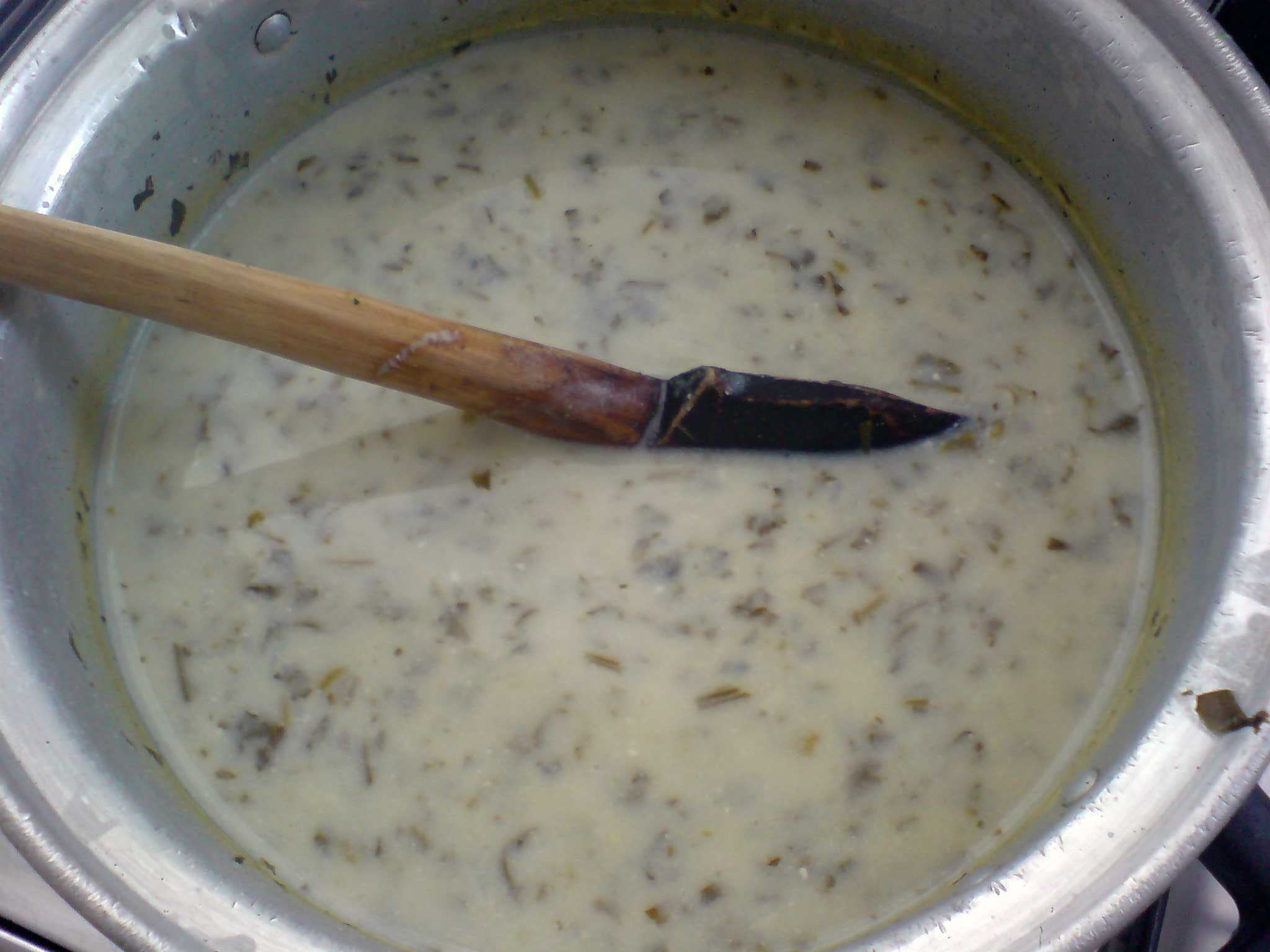
Bushala

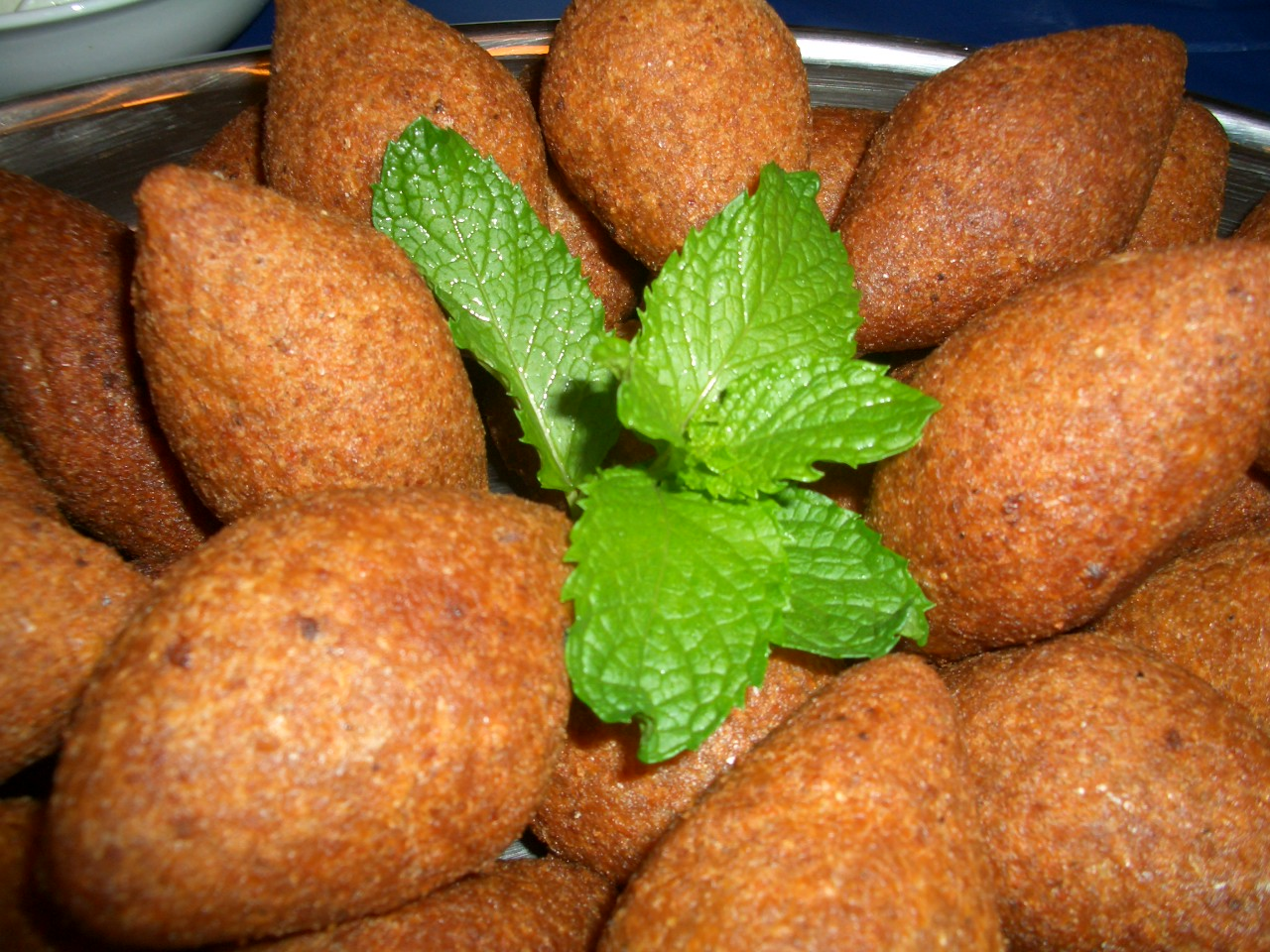
Typical kubba

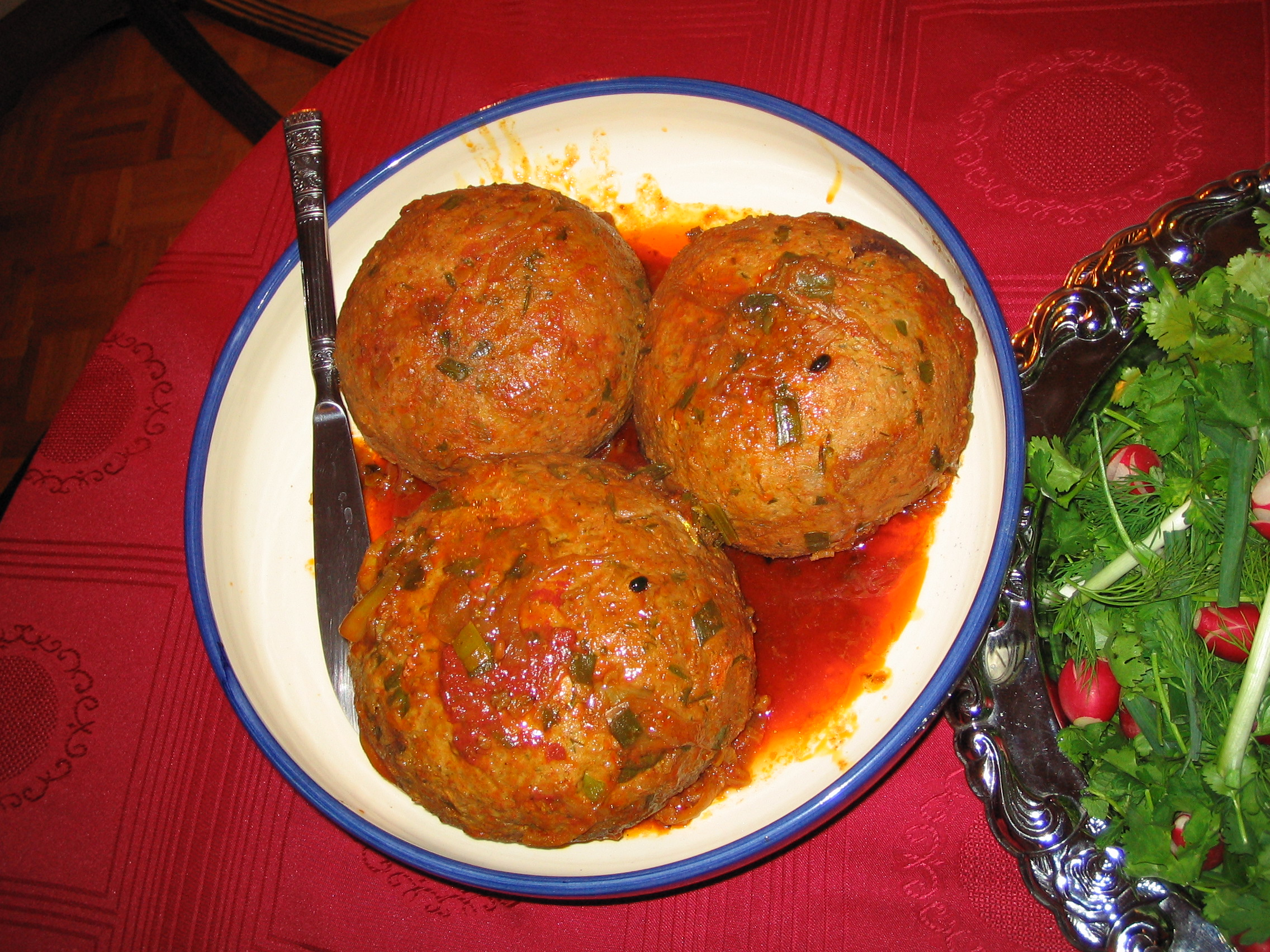
Kipteh

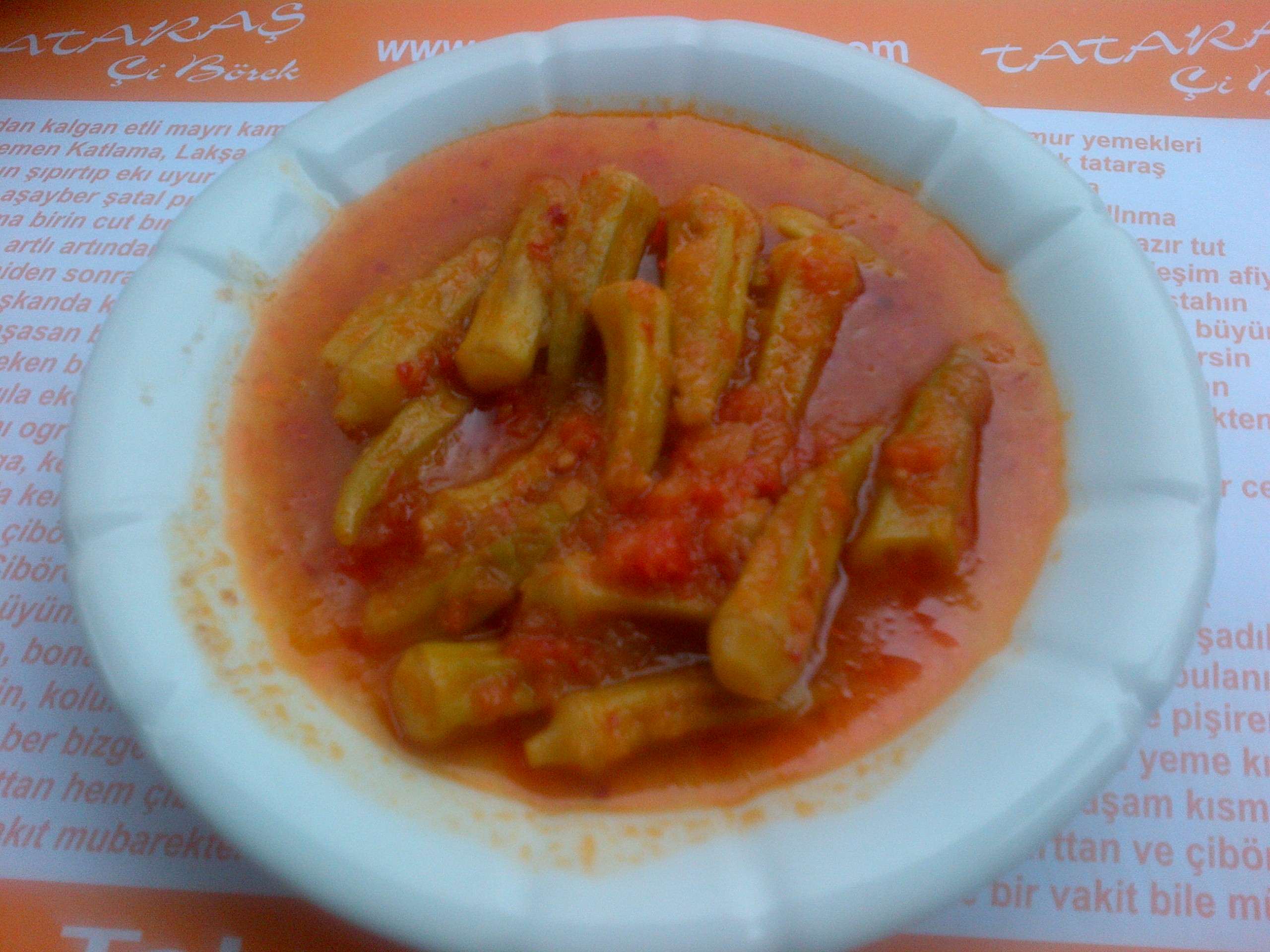
Okra stew

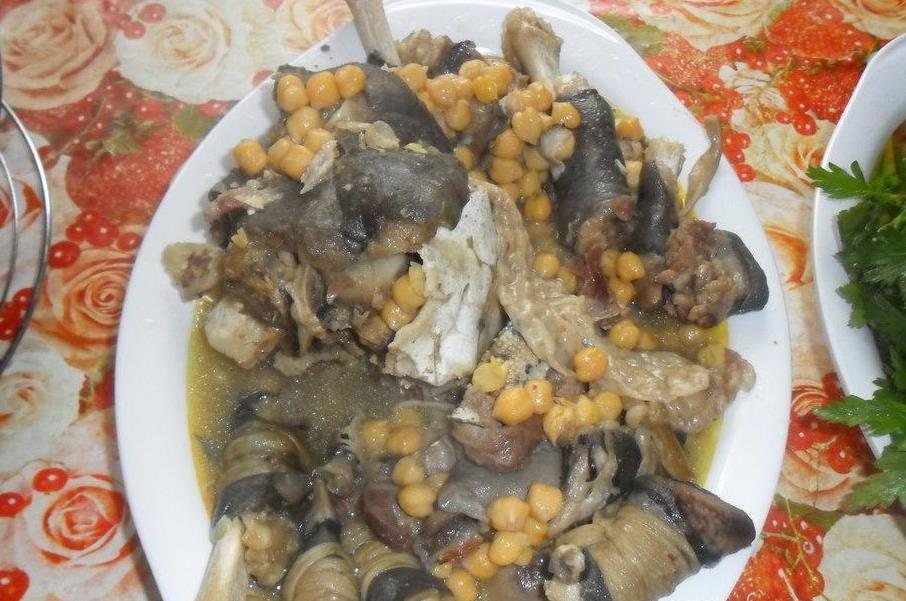
Pacha

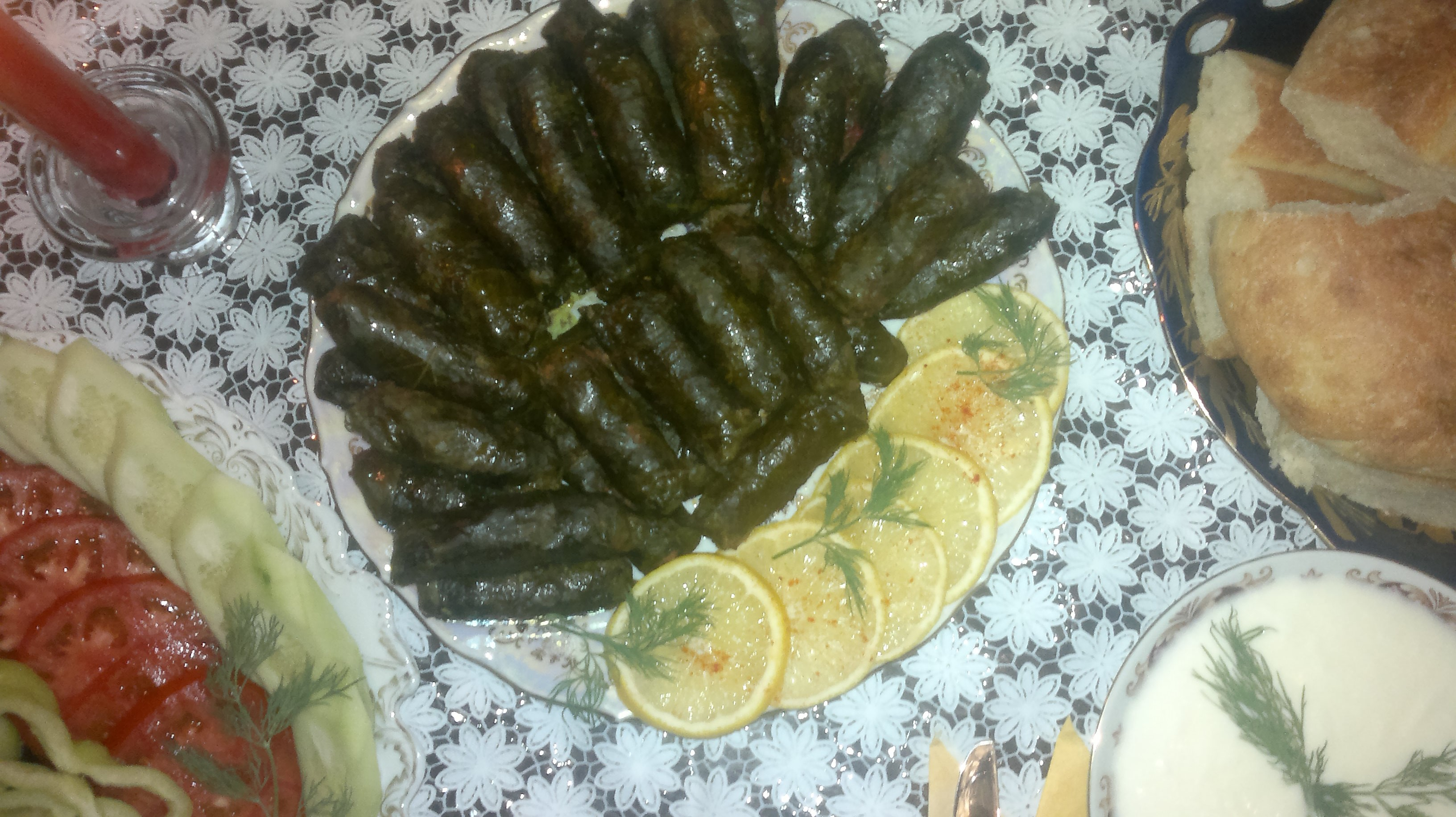
Dolma

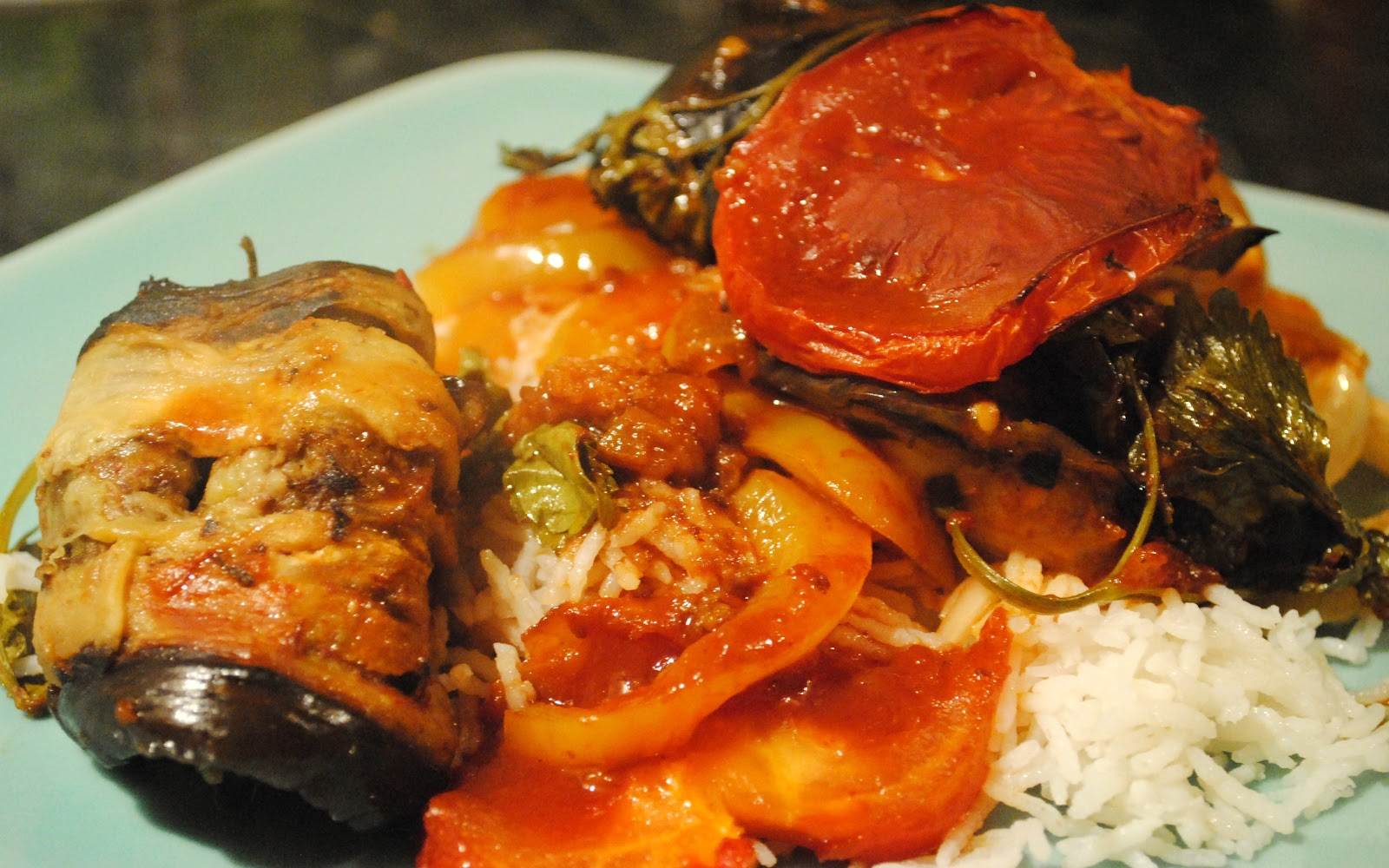
Tepsi

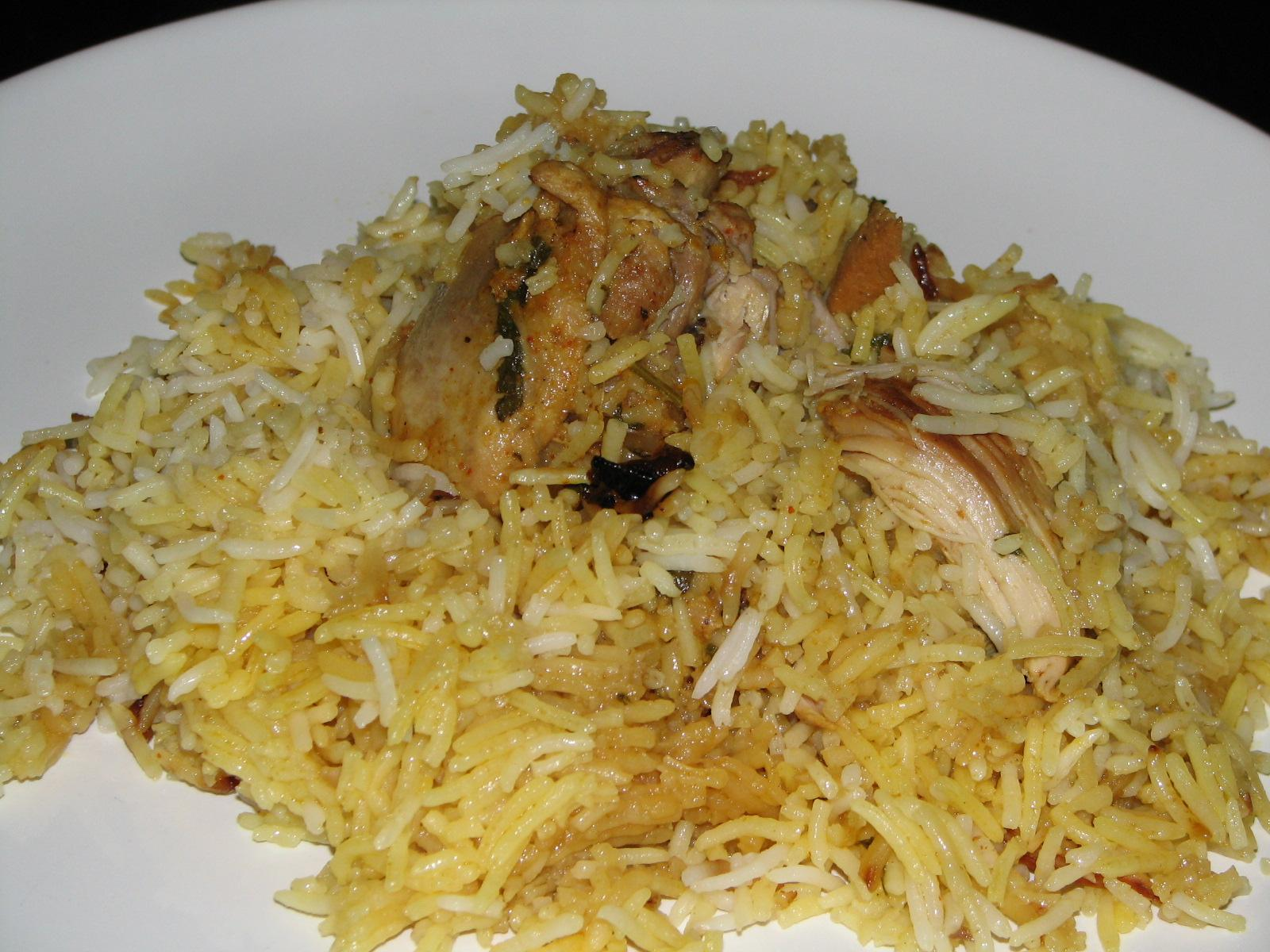
Biryani

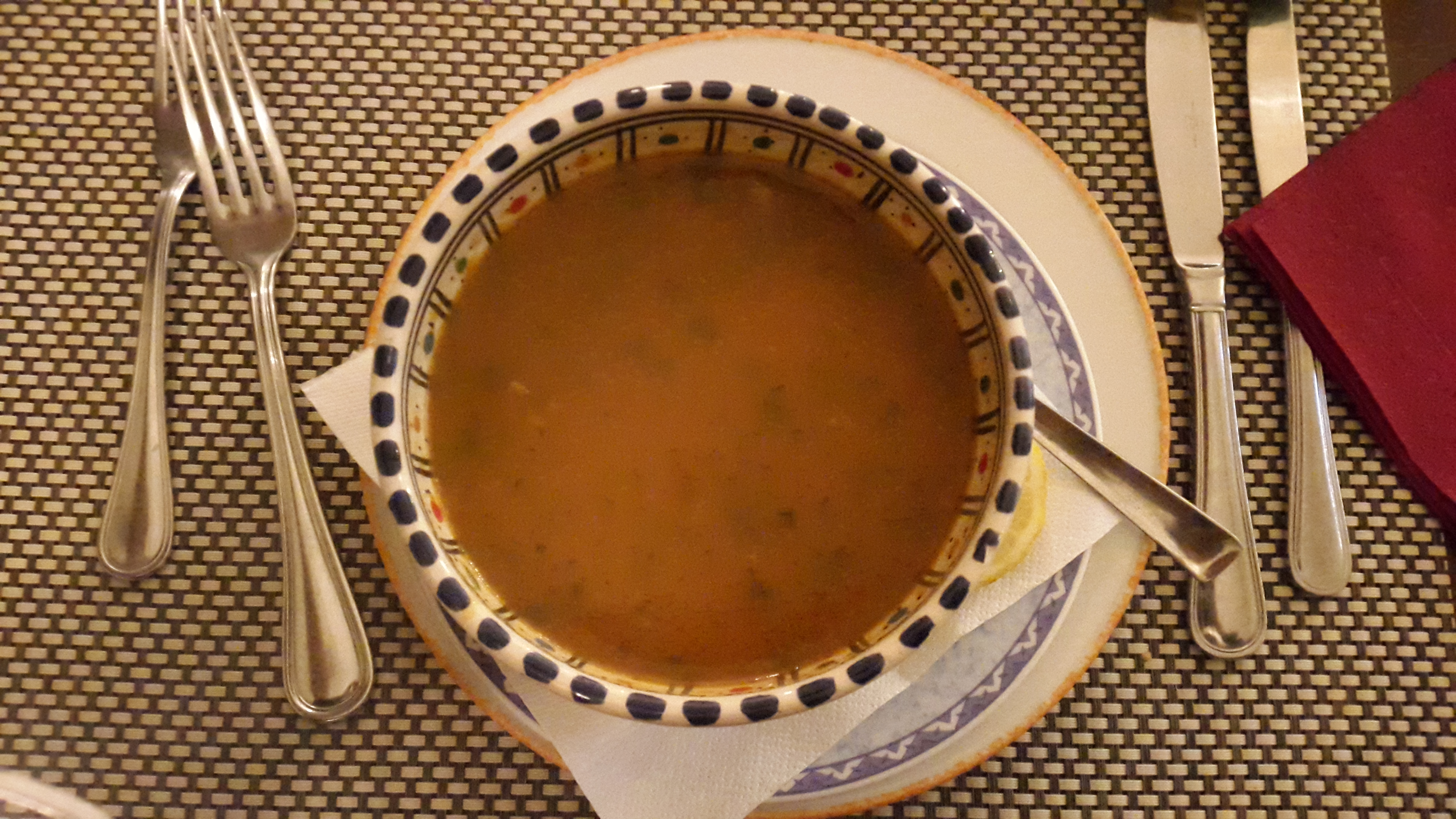
Tlokheh (lentil soup)

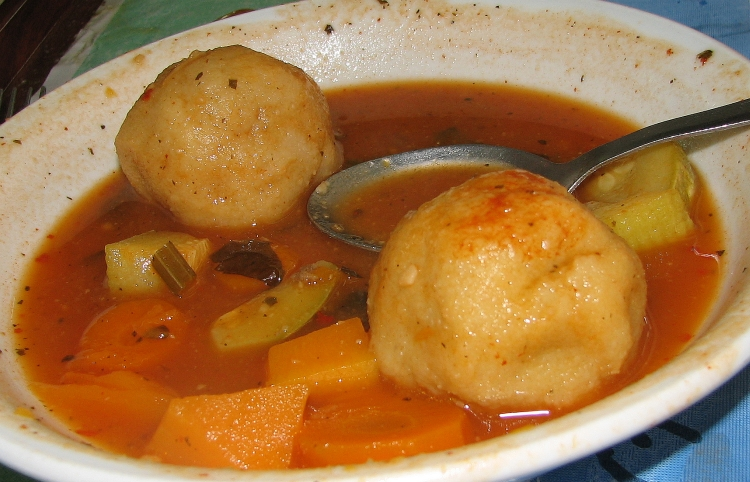
Kouba stew

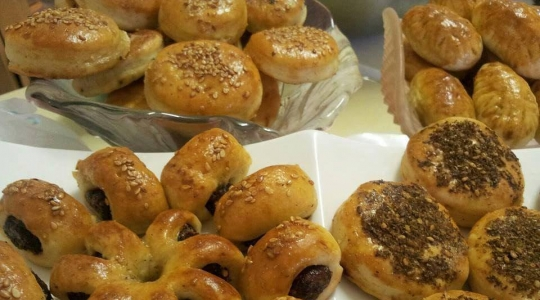
Kleicha

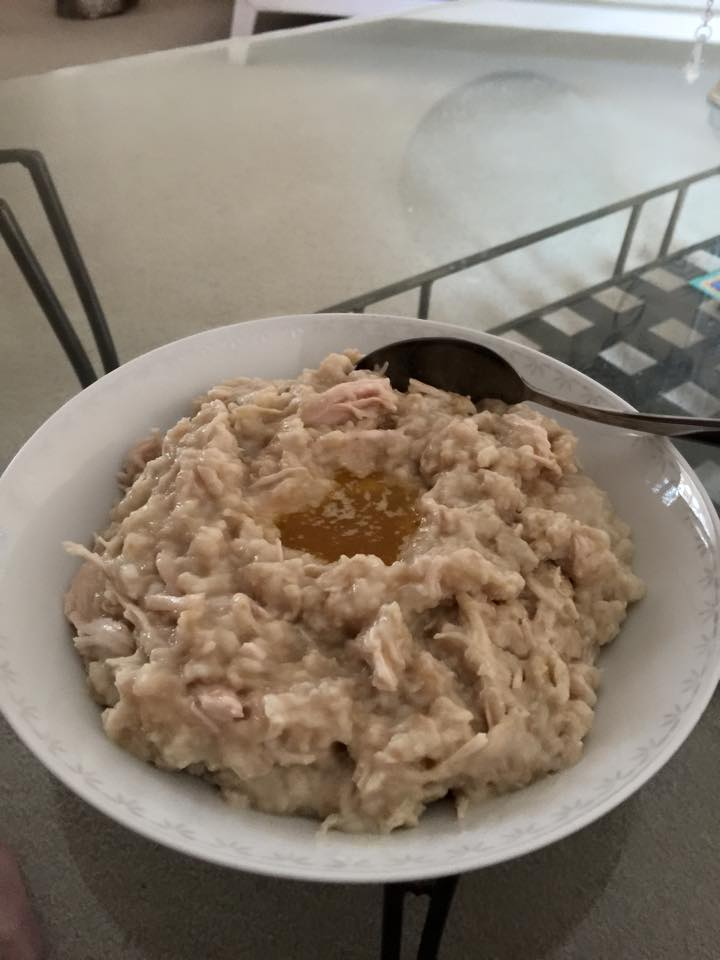
Hareesa (wheat porridge)

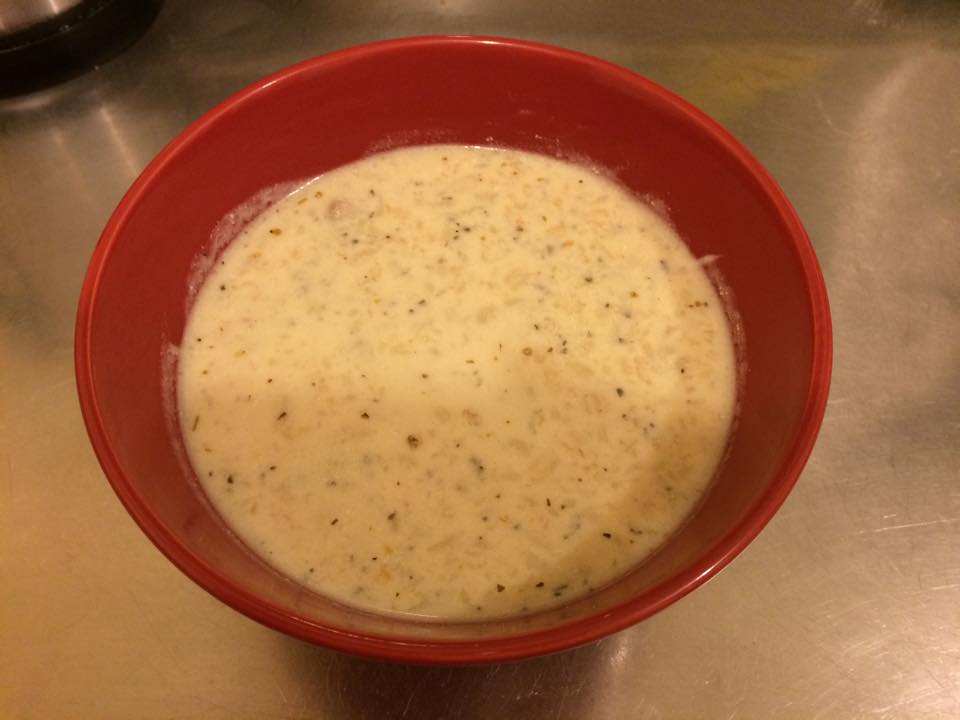
Dekhwa (barley soup)

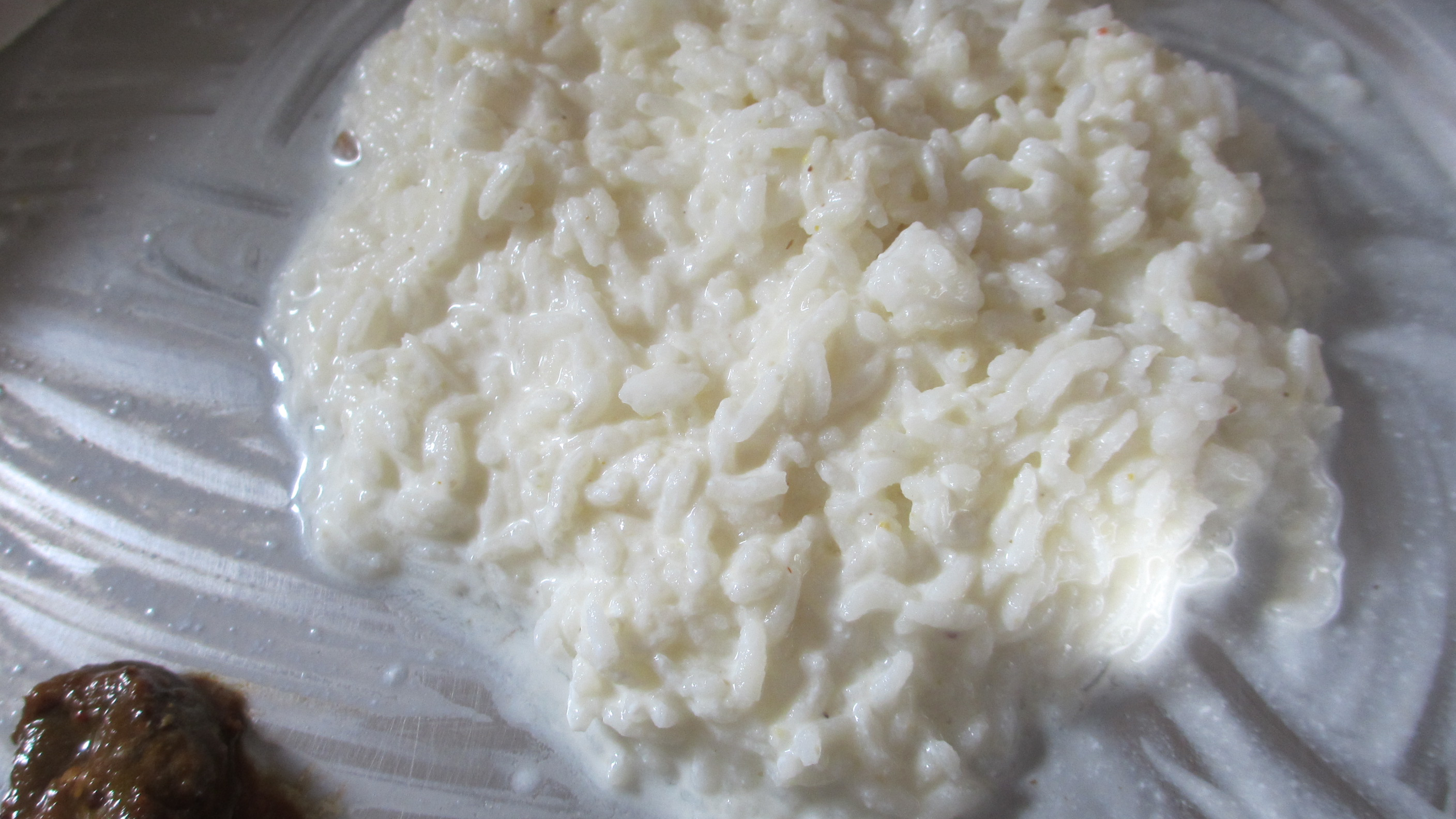
Gerdoo

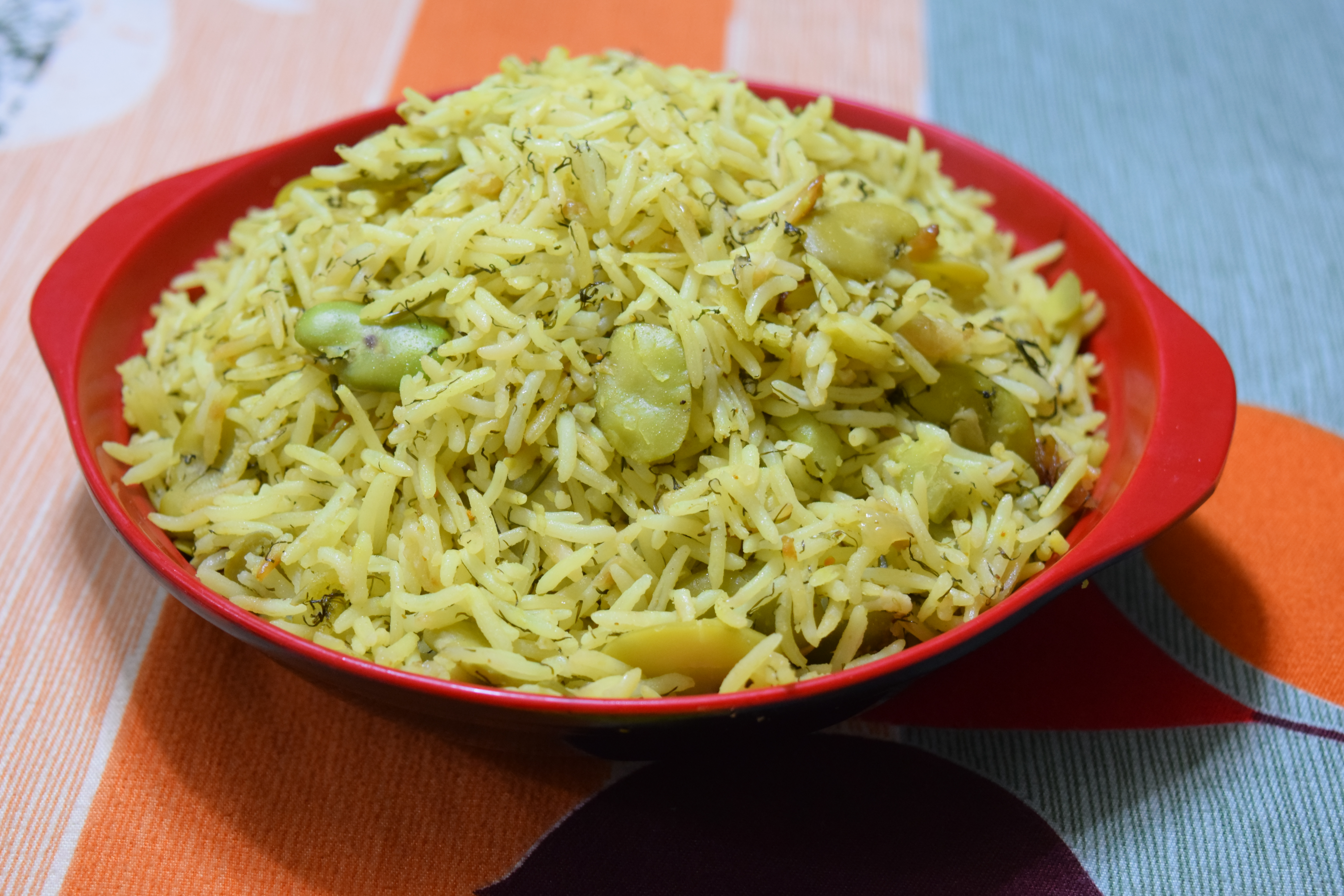
Green rice

== See also ==
- Arab cuisine
- Berber cuisine
- Jewish cuisine
- Kurdish cuisine
- Syrian cuisine
