= Iraqi cuisine =

Culinary traditions of Iraq

Iraqi cuisine is a Middle Eastern cuisine that has its origins in the ancient Near East culture of the Fertile Crescent. Tablets found in ancient ruins in Iraq show recipes prepared in the temples during religious festivals—the first cookbooks in the world. Ancient Iraq's cultural sophistication extended to the culinary arts.

The Iraqi kitchen reached its zenith in the Islamic Golden Age when Baghdad was the capital of the Abbasid Caliphate (750–1258 AD).

In Northern Iraq pomegranate is added to dolma. In Southern Iraq, fish is a staple. The center of the country is known for its rice dishes and sweets.

In terms of agriculture, Iraq harks back to ancient Mesopotamia, growing wheat and crops requiring winter chill such as apples and stone fruits. Lower Mesopotamia grows rice and barley, citrus fruits, and is responsible for Iraq's position as one of the world's largest producer of dates.

Pork consumption is forbidden to Muslims in Iraq, in accordance with Sharia, the Islamic law.

== History ==
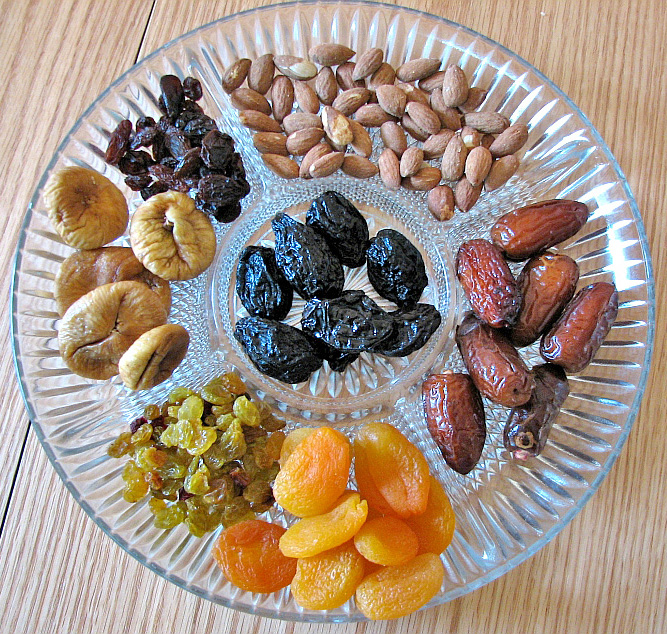
Dates, apricots, figs, and prunes are processed to make dried fruits

Archaeologists have found evidence from excavations at Jarmo, in northeastern Iraq, that pistachio nuts were a common food as early as 6750 BC. Among the ancient texts discovered in Mesopotamia is a Sumerian-Akkadian bilingual dictionary, recorded in cuneiform script on 24 stone tablets about 1900 BC. It lists terms in the two ancient Iraqi languages for over 800 different items of food and drink. Included are 20 different kinds of cheese, over 100 varieties of soup and 300 types of bread, each with different ingredients, filling, shape or size.

The world's oldest recipes are found in Mesopotamia of modern-day ancient Iraq, written in cuneiform tablets. One of three excavated cuneiform clay tablets written in 1700 BC in Babylon, 50 miles (80 km) south of present-day Baghdad, contains 24 recipes for stew cooked with meat and vegetables, enhanced and seasoned with leeks, onion, garlic, and spices and herbs like cassia, cumin, coriander, mint, and dill. Stew has remained a mainstay in the cuisine. Extant medieval Iraqi recipes and modern Iraqi cuisine attest to this.

== Ingredients ==
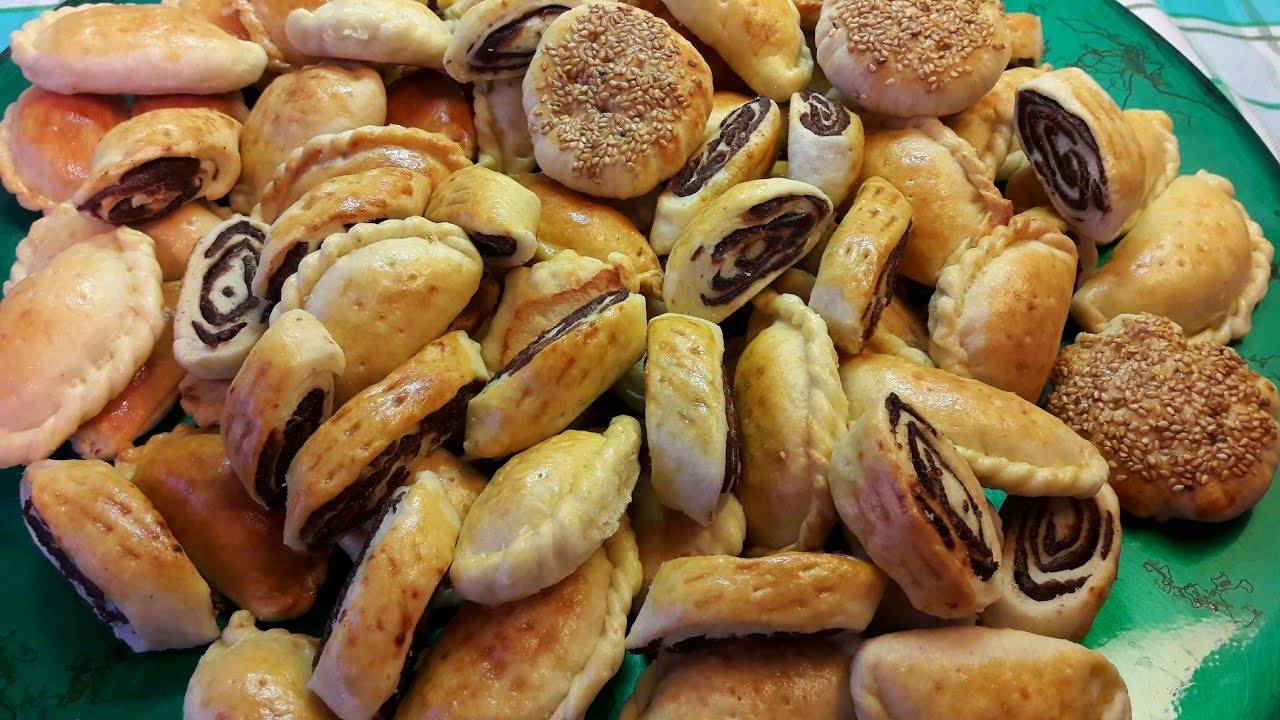
Kleicha is sometimes considered the national cookie of Iraq and is served during religious holidays.

Some characteristic ingredients of Iraqi cuisine include:

- Vegetables (e.g. eggplant, tomato, turnips, beans, shallots, okra, onion, lentils, cress, potato, cabbage, courgette (zucchini), spinach, lettuce, leeks, artichokes, garlic, peppers and chilli peppers).
- Cereals (e.g. rice, bulghur wheat and barley).
- Pulses and legumes (e.g. lentils, chickpeas, green beans, green grams, and cannellini beans).
- Fruits (e.g. olives, dates, raisins, apricots, plums, figs, grapes, melons, pomegranates, apples, cherries, quinces, and citrus fruits—oranges, lemons and limes).
- Cheeses (e.g. baladi, feta and halloumi).
- Herbs and spices (e.g. cinnamon, cardamom, coriander, fenugreek, cumin, oregano, mint, tarragon, thyme, saffron, dried lime, cassia, dill, turmeric, baharat, advieh, sumac and za'atar).
- Nuts and seeds (e.g. sesame, pistachios, almonds, walnuts, hazelnuts and pine nuts).

Other Iraqi culinary essentials include olive oil, sesame oil, tamarind, vermicelli, tahini, honey, date syrup, yogurt and rose water.

Lamb is the favorite meat, but chicken, beef, goat and fish are also eaten. Most dishes are served with rice—usually timman anbar, a yellowish, very aromatic, long-grain rice grown in the Middle Euphrates region.

Bulghur wheat is used in many dishes, having been a staple in the country since the days of the ancient Assyrians. Flatbread is a staple that is served with a variety of dips, cheeses, olives, and jams, at every meal.

== Common dishes ==
=== Mezza ===
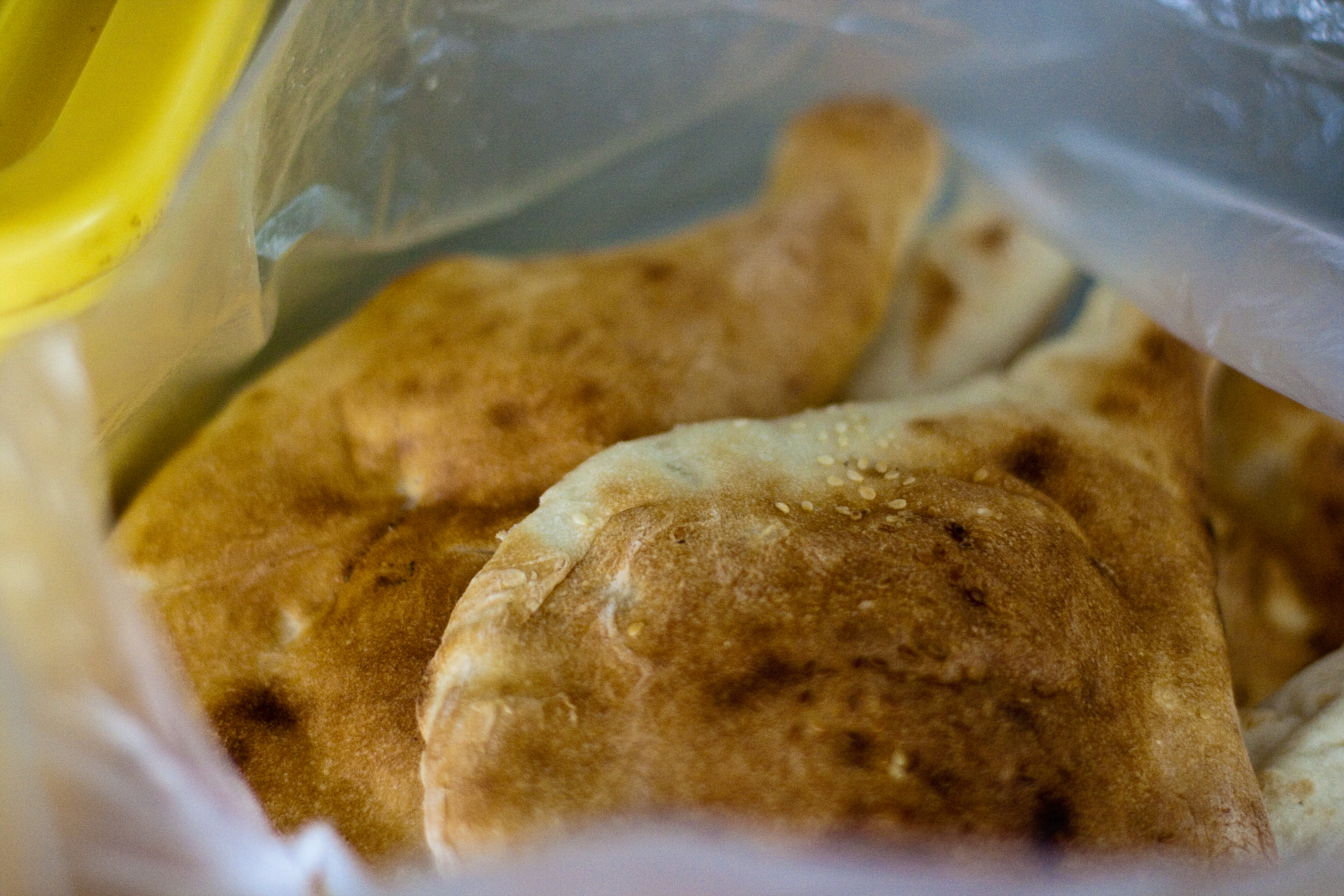
Samoon, type of Iraqi bread.

Meals begin with appetizers and salads, known as mezza. Mezza is a selection of appetizers or small dishes often served with a beverage, like anise-flavored liqueurs such as arak, ouzo, rakı, sambuca, pastis, or various wines, similar to the tapas of Spain, or finger food. Mezza may include:

- Iraqi sumac salad, a typical Iraqi salad with the addition of sumac berries.
- Baytinijan maqli, a dish often served cold, consisting of fried aubergine (eggplant) with tahini, lettuce, parsley and tomatoes, garnished with sumac and served on pita bread or sliced bread, often grilled or toasted. Variations include bell peppers, or a garlic-lemon vinaigrette.
- Fattoush, a salad made from several garden vegetables and toasted or fried pieces of pita bread.
- Tabbouleh, a salad dish, often used as part of a mezze. Its primary ingredients are finely chopped parsley, bulgur, mint, tomato, scallion, and other herbs with lemon juice, olive oil and various seasonings, generally including black pepper and sometimes cinnamon and allspice.
- Turshi, pickled vegetables in the cuisine of many Balkan and Middle East countries. It is a traditional appetizer, mezze for rakı, ouzo, tsipouro and rakia.

=== Dips ===
- Baba ghanoush, a dish of baked aubergine (eggplant) mashed and mixed with various seasonings.
- Hummus, a dip or spread made from cooked, mashed chickpeas, blended with tahini, olive oil, lemon juice, salt and garlic.
- Jajik, an appetizer, also used as a sauce for shish and döner kebab. Jajik is made of strained yogurt (usually sheep's milk or goat's milk in Greece and Turkey) with cucumbers, garlic, salt, usually olive oil, pepper, dill, sometimes lemon juice and parsley, or mint added. The cucumbers are either puréed and strained, or seeded and finely diced. Olive oil, olives, and herbs are often used as garnishes.

=== Soups and stews ===
Various stews served over rice form a major part of Iraqi cuisine.

- Fasolia yabsa (Iraqi white bean stew), made up of tender lamb or veal, white kidney beans (also called cannellini beans), tomato sauce and served over rice.
- Fasoulia, a soup of dry white beans, olive oil, and vegetables.
- Harissa, similar to keşkek, a porridge made of stewed and boned chicken and coarsely ground soaked wheat.
- Kebabs, a dish consisting of grilled or broiled meats on a skewer or stick. The most common kebabs include lamb and beef, although others use chicken or fish.
- Lentil soup, may be vegetarian or include meat, and may use brown, red, yellow or black lentils, with or without the husk.
- Maqluba, an upside-down rice and aubergine (eggplant) casserole, hence the name which means "upside-down". It is sometimes made with fried cauliflower instead of aubergine and usually includes meat—often braised lamb.
- Margat bamia or simply bamia, a stew made with okra and lamb or beef cubes in a tomato sauce.
- Margat baytinijan, an aubergine-based dish of the Balkans and the Middle East. All versions are based primarily on sautéed aubergine (eggplant) and tomato, usually with minced meat.

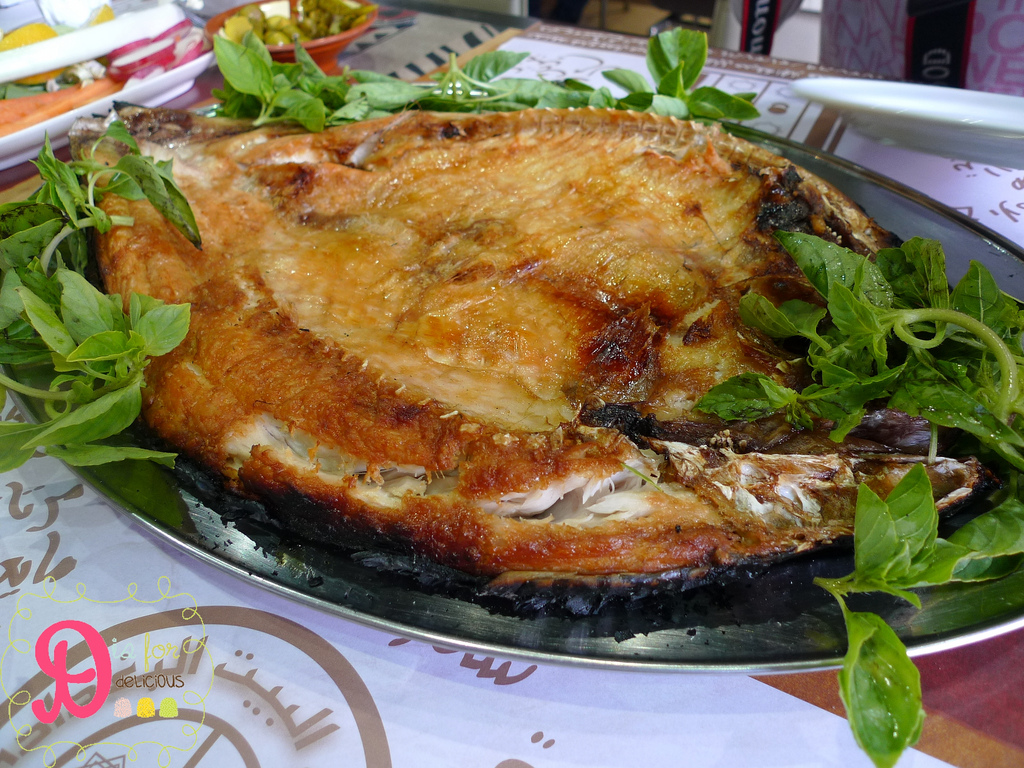
A prepared masgouf

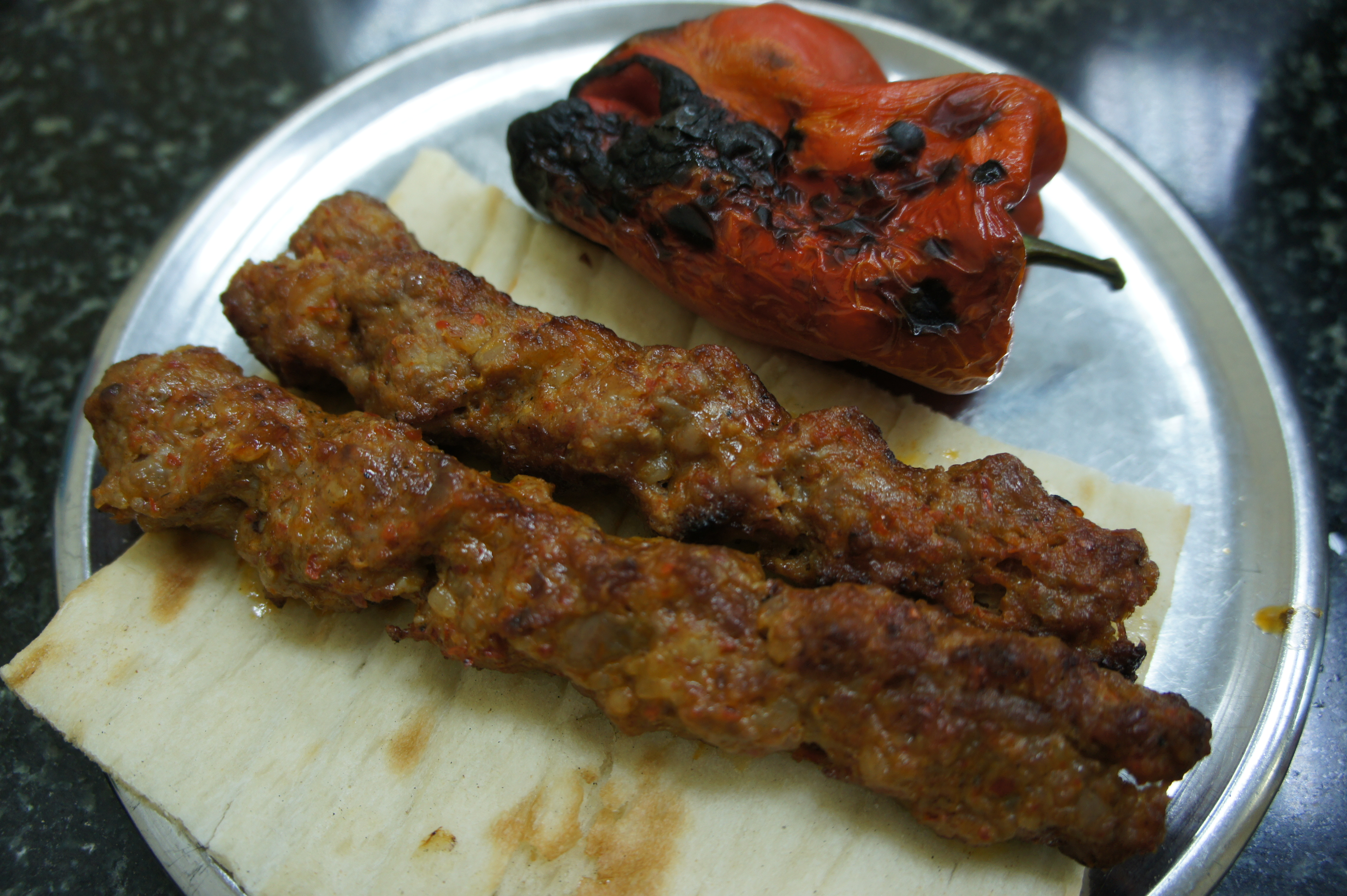
Iraqi kebab, usually served with khubz or samoon

- Masgouf, a traditional Mesopotamian dish made with fish from the Tigris. It is an open-cut freshwater fish roasted for hours after being marinated with olive oil, salt, curcuma and tamarind while keeping the skin on. Traditional garnishes for the masgouf include lemon, chopped onions and tomatoes, as well as the clay-oven flatbreads common to Iraq and much of the Middle East.
- Pomegranate soup, called shorbat rumman in Iraq. It is made from pomegranate juice and seeds, yellow split peas, ground beef, mint leaves, spices, and other ingredients.
- Qeema, a minced meat, tomato and chickpea stew, served with rice. Traditionally prepared at the annual Ashura commemorations in southern Iraq and can also be served in funerals, weddings, etc. The name qeema is an ancient Akkadian word meaning "finely chopped".

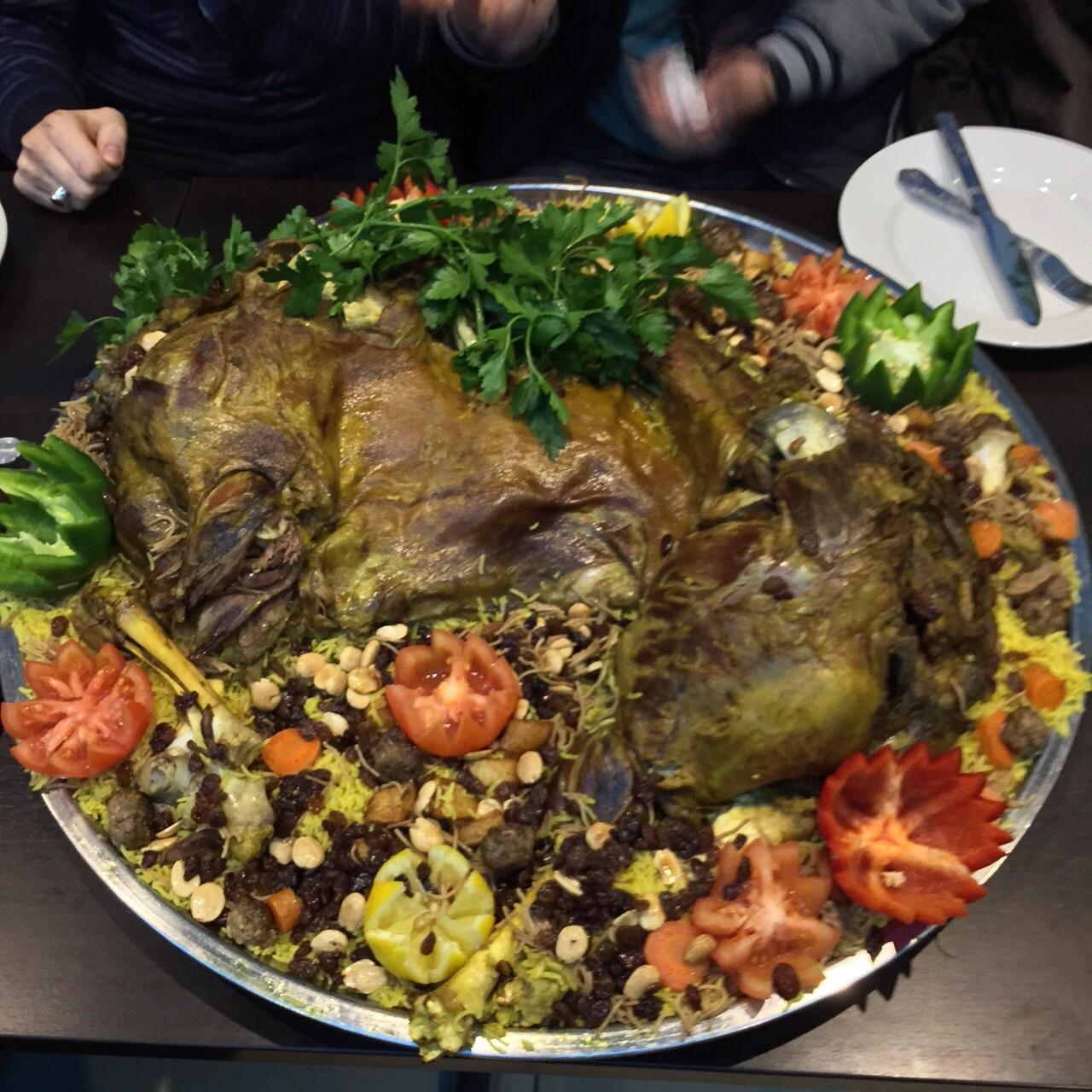
Quzi

- Quzi, stuffed roasted lamb.
- Hikakeh is a thin crust of slightly browned rice at the bottom of the cooking pot.

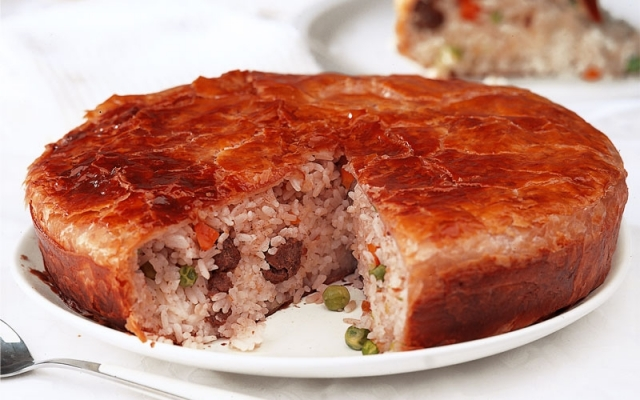
A plate of Parda blaw

- Tashrib, a soup made with either lamb or chicken with or without tomatoes eaten with Iraqi nan; the bread is broken into pieces and the soup is poured over in a big bowl.

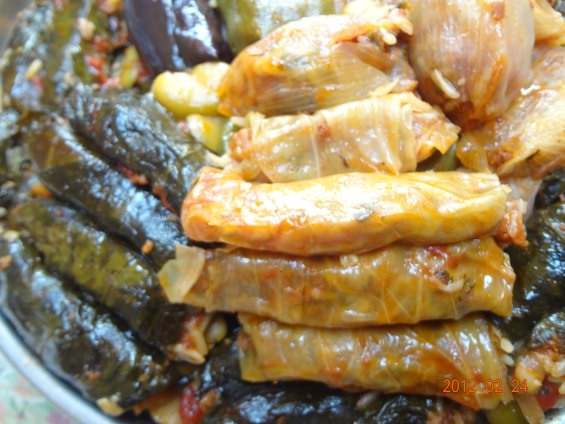
Iraqi dolma

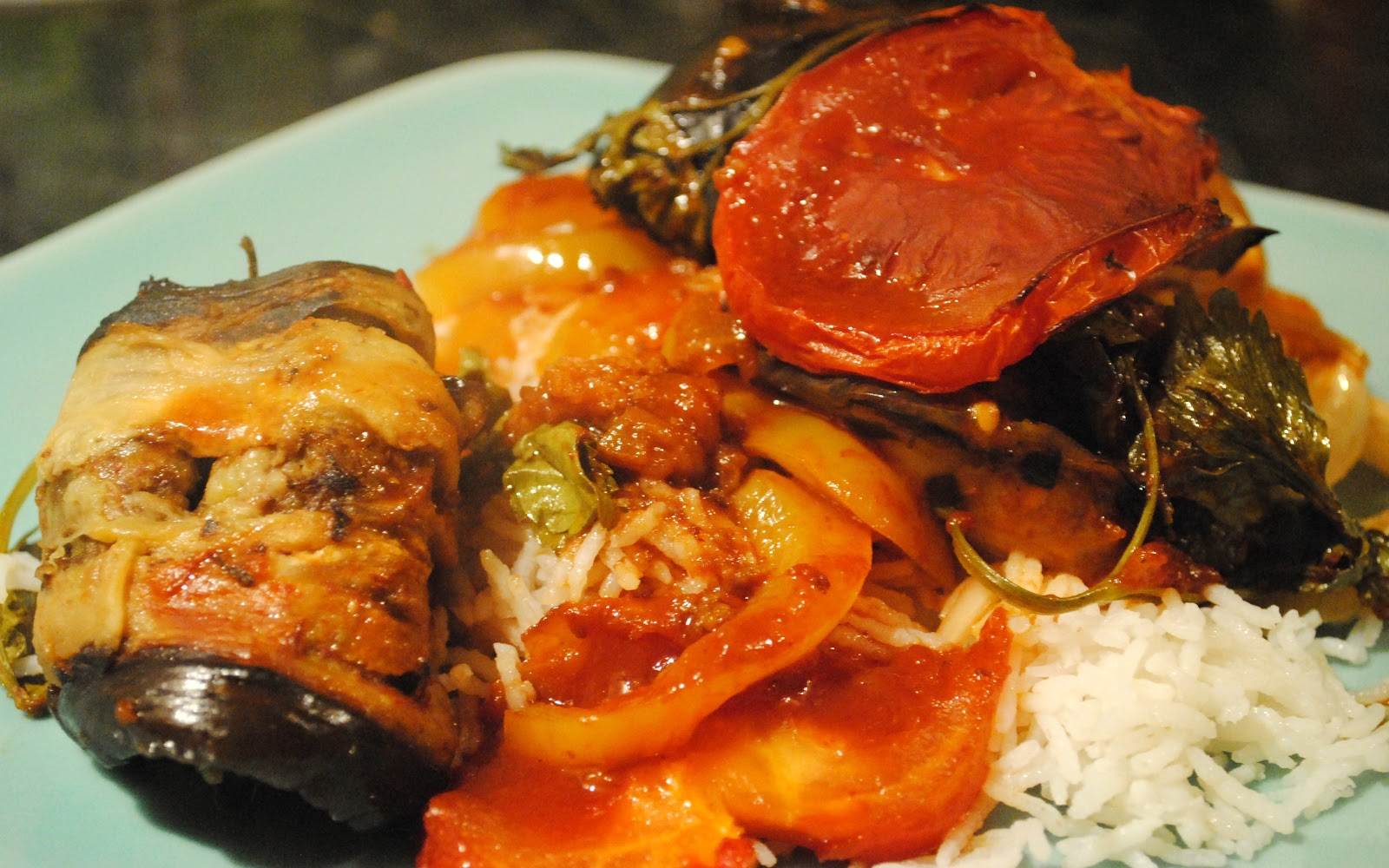
Tepsi baytinijan

- Tepsi baytinijan, an Iraqi casserole. The main ingredient of the dish is aubergine (eggplant), which is sliced and fried before placing in a baking dish, accompanied with chunks of lamb/beef/veal and/or meatballs, plus tomatoes, onions and garlic.

Potato slices are placed on top of the mixture, and the dish is baked. Like many other Iraqi dishes it is usually served with rice, along with salad and pickles.

=== Dumplings and meatballs ===
- Dolma (sarma), a family of stuffed vegetable dishes. The grape-leaf dolma is common. Courgette (zucchini), aubergine (eggplant), tomato and pepper are commonly used as fillings. The stuffing may or may not include meat.
- Falafel, a fried ball or patty made from spiced chickpeas or fava beans. Originally from Egypt, falafel is a form of common fast food in the Middle East, where it is also served as a kind of mezze and more commonly eaten with samoon with a salad and usually Amba (condiment) as dressing
- Kofta, a family of meatball or meatloaf dishes in Middle Eastern, Indian, and Balkan cuisines. In the simplest form, koftas consist of balls of minced or ground meat—usually beef or lamb—mixed with spices or onions.

Vegetarian varieties include lauki kofta, shahi aloo kofta, and malai kofta.

- Kubba, a dish made of rice or burghul, chopped meat, and spices. There are many varieties and variations of kubba. One of the best-known varieties is a torpedo-shaped burghul shell stuffed with chopped meat and fried. Other varieties are baked, poached, or even served raw. They may be shaped into balls, patties, or flat.
- Samosa, a small fried or baked pasty, which may be either half-moon shaped or triangular.

=== Processed meat ===
- Pastırma, a highly seasoned, air-dried cured beef in the cuisines of the former Ottoman countries.
- Sujuk, a dry, spicy sausage eaten from the Balkans to the Middle East and Central Asia.

=== Rice dishes ===
Long-grain rice is a staple in Iraqi cuisine. Iraqi rice cooking is a multistep process intended to produce just-tender, fluffy grains. A prominent aspect of Iraqi rice cooking is the hikakeh, a crisp bottom crust. Before serving, the hikakeh is broken into pieces so that everyone is provided with some along with the fluffy rice.

- Dolma, vine leaves stuffed with a mixture of ground lamb or beef with rice cooked with many fillings in the same pot, with pomegranate juice prominently added by North Iraqis to give it a unique taste.

The Assyrians of Iraq may either call it dolma or yaprekh which is the Syriac term for stuffed grape leaves.
Iraqis usually serve dolma without yoghurt. Often chicken or beef ribs are added to the cooking pot, and sometimes served with the dolma instead of masta or khalwah. Iraqi dolma is usually cooked and served in a tomato-based sauce.
Dolma is very popular in Iraq. In Mosul they include courgettes (zucchini), tomatoes, onions, peppers, eggplant, and grape leaves. They are occasionally steamed.

- Biryani, several rice-based foods made with spices, rice usually basmati and أرز عنبر and meat/vegetable, collectively popular in Iraq, Iran, Afghanistan, Pakistan, Bangladesh, India and among Muslims in Sri Lanka.
- Mutabbaq samak (Arabic: مطبق سمك), fried fish served over stocked rice.
- Pilaf, similar to that of Iran.
- Quzi, a rice-based dish served with very slow-cooked lamb and roasted nuts and raisins.
- Tibeat, a Jewish-Iraqi dish made for Shabbat, slow-cooked chicken stuffed with rice, tomatoes, dried apricots and raisins, with a strong cardamom flavor.

In Iraqi Arabic, rice is called temmen, which is an assimilation of English "ten men" (a brand of Indian basmati rice). According to a common folktale, the word originated after World War I when Iraqi farmers declined to provide the British with rice to feed their soldiers in Basra. Thereafter, the British imported "Ten Men" instead. As such, when Iraqi porters used to hear British soldiers requesting them to carry the pouches of "Ten Men", they thought it meant rice in English. The word temmen has since entered the Iraqi vocabulary, and today, Iraqis still use that word for rice.

=== Sandwiches and wraps ===
- Shawarma, a Middle-Eastern Arabic-style sandwich-like wrap usually composed of shaved lamb, goat, chicken, turkey, beef, or a mixture of meats. Shawarma is a popular dish and fast-food staple across the Middle East and North Africa.

=== Dairy ===
- Baladi cheese, a soft, white cheese originating from the Middle East, with a mild yet rich flavor.
- Geimar, a creamy dairy product, similar to clotted cream, made in the Balkans, Turkey, Iran and Central Asia. It is made from water buffalo's milk in the East, or cow's milk in the West.
- Jameed, hard dry labneh (strained yogurt) made from sheep's milk.
- Jibneh Arabieh, a simple cheese found all over the Middle East, particularly popular in the Persian Gulf area, with an open texture and a mild taste similar to feta, but less salty.
- Labneh, yogurt which has been strained in a cloth or paper bag or filter, traditionally made of muslin, to remove the whey, giving a consistency between that of yogurt and cheese, while preserving yogurt's distinctive sour taste.

=== Breads and pastries ===
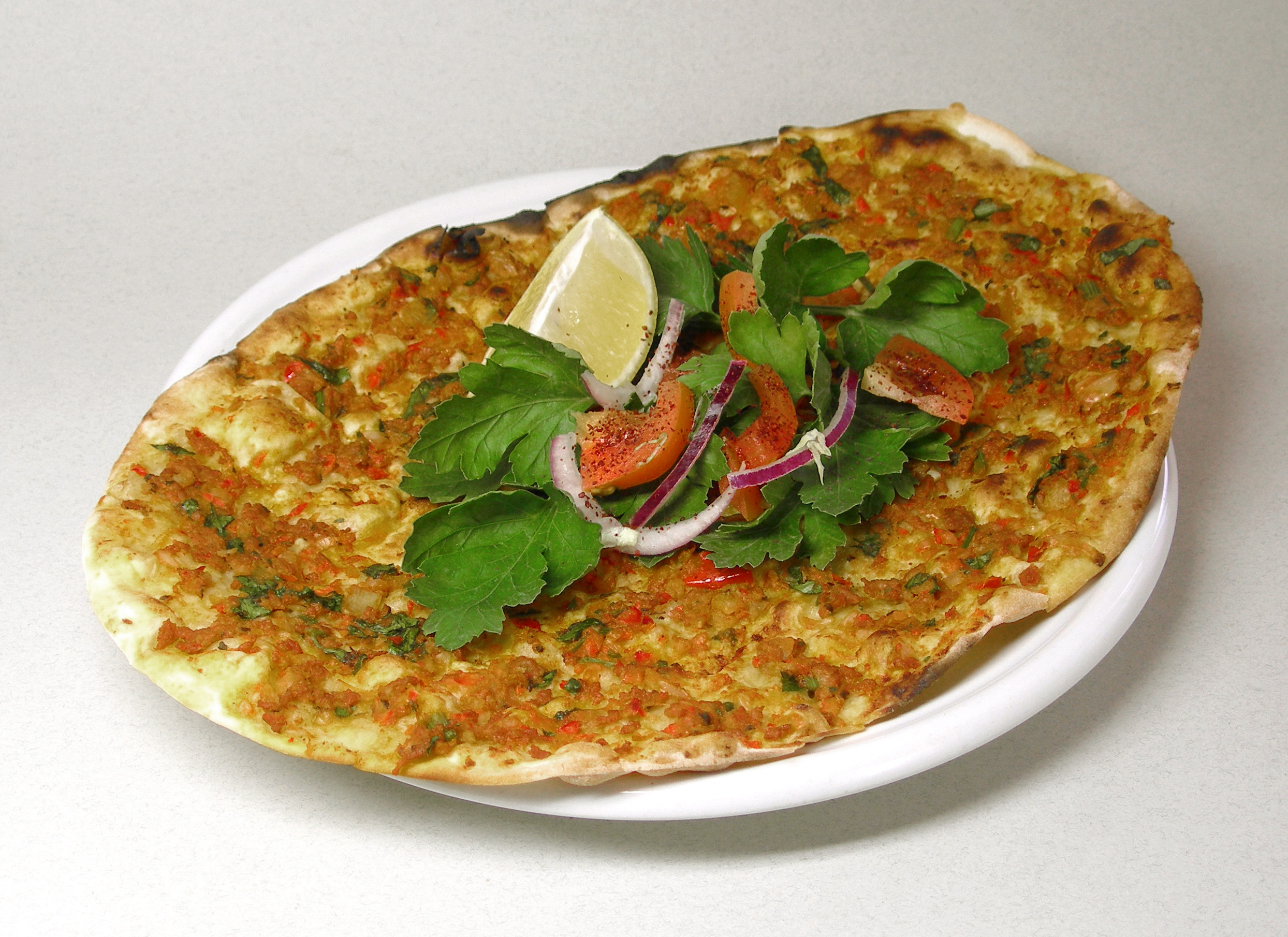
Lahm b'ajeen, garnished with parsley, tomato, red onion, and a wedge of lemon

- Burek, a type of baked or fried filled pastry. It is made of a thin flaky dough known as phyllo dough (or yufka dough), and are filled with salty cheese (often feta), minced meat, potatoes or other vegetables.
- Ka'ak, refer to several different types of baked goods produced throughout the Arab world and the Near East.
- Kadaif, a very fine vermicelli-like pastry used to make sweet pastries and desserts.
- Kahi, layers of thin dough phyllo usually consumed warm for breakfast by adding creamy kaymak and light sugar syrup. This pastry is mostly spread in the Southern region of Iraq.
- Khubz Iraqi, an Arabic flatbread that is part of the local diet in many countries of Western Asia.
- Laffa (an Iraqi pita or naan bread).
- Lahmacun, a thin pizza topped with minced meat and herbs.
- Lavash, a soft, thin flatbread.
- Manakish, a pizza consisting of dough topped with thyme, cheese, or ground meat.
- Markook, a type of flatbread common in the countries of the Levant. It is baked on a domed or convex metal griddle, known as saj. It is usually sizable, about 2 feet, thin, almost transparent.
- Pita, a family of yeast-leavened round flatbreads baked from wheat flour.
- Samoon, a flat and round bread.
- Sfiha, a pizza-like dish traditionally made with ground mutton rather than the more modern addition of lamb or beef in Brazil. They are open-faced meat pies with no top dough.

Sfiha are much like dolma, ground lamb, lightly spiced, wrapped in brined grape leaves.

=== Condiments, sauces and spices ===
- Amba, a tangy mango pickle condiment from Pakistan and India. Commonly eaten as a side dish and sometimes as a sandwich topping.
- Baharat, a spice mixture. Typical ingredients include allspice, black pepper corns, cardamom seeds, cassia bark, cloves, coriander seeds, cumin seeds, nutmeg, dried red chili peppers or paprika.
- Dibis, a thick, very sweet date syrup. Often mixed with tahini to create a dip.
- Jallab, a type of syrup popular in the Middle East made from dates, grape molasses and rose water.
- Mahleb, an aromatic spice made from the seeds of the St Lucie Cherry (Prunus mahaleb).
- Rose water (Mayy wared), used in various Middle-Eastern dishes, especially in sweets.
- Tahini (t'heena), a paste of ground sesame seeds used in cooking. Middle-Eastern tahini is made of hulled, lightly roasted seeds.
- Za'atar, a mixture of herbs and spices used as a condiment.

=== Sweets ===
The earliest known recipe for cake comes from ancient Mesopotamia. Believed to be primarily for consumption at the palace or temple, the cake was made from fat, white cheese, dates and raisins. Another recipe dating to the reign of Hammurabi (1792 BCE–1750 BCE) includes similar basic ingredients with the addition of grape syrup, figs and apples.

The traditional Iraqi kleicha cookies are believed to have their roots in Mesopotamian qullupu—date filled pastries baked in a wood-fired oven called tannour. In modern times, other types of cookies (biskit) and cakes (ka'ak) are made at home, usually flavored with cardamom or rose water. Some variations include the disc-shaped khfefiyyat, half-moon shaped kleichat joz made with nuts, and date-filled kleichat tamur.

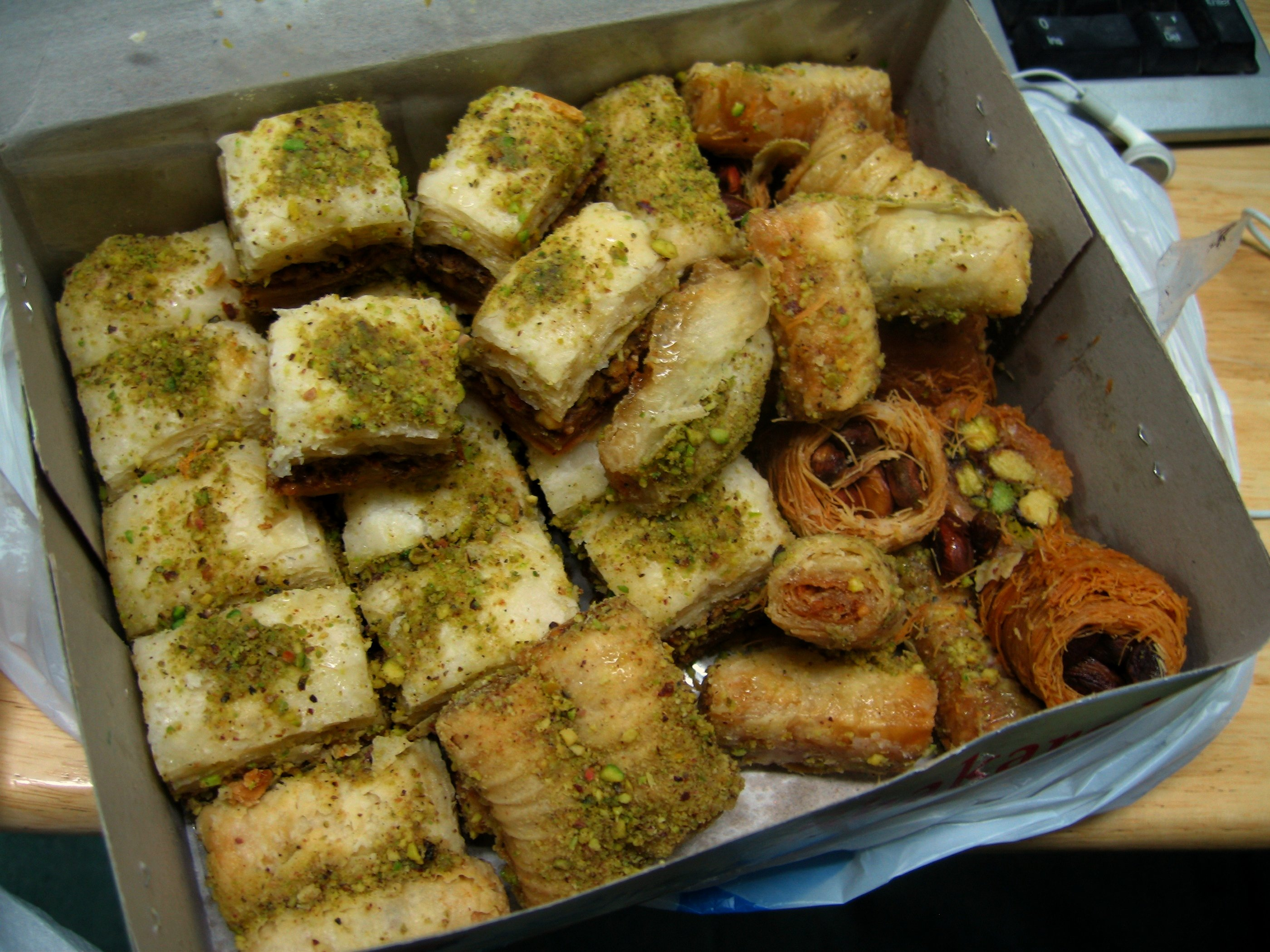
"White baklava", osh el bulbul (bird's nests) and other traditional sweets in Iraq

Cookbooks dating to the Abbasid Caliphate between the 10th and 13th centuries include recipes for hundreds of desserts. The tradition continues into the modern day, but the rich, syrupy desserts like baklava are usually prepared for special occasions or religious celebrations, as most daily meals are usually followed by a simple course of seasonal fruit, especially dates, figs, cantaloupes, nectarines, apricots, pomegranates, peaches, mulberries, grapes or watermelons.

Though not as recognizable as baklava, the fried pastry called lauzeenaj, flavored with mastic and rose water, was a specialty in imperial Baghdad.

Rosette-shaped fritters called zalabia are a local specialty, believed to take their name from Ziryab, a well-known Iraqi musician in the Caliphate of Cordoba.

Baklava and zalabia are typical offerings during the Eid al-Fitr celebrations that follow Ramadan. Halqoum (commonly known as Turkish delight) are traditionally given as gifts during the holiday.

Others include:

- Halva, popular in the Balkans, Poland, Middle East, and other areas surrounding the Mediterranean Sea. The primary ingredients in this confection are sesame butter or paste (tahini), and sugar, glucose or honey.
- Kanafeh, a pastry made with layers of semolina, white cheese and a sugary syrup sprinkled with rose water.
- Luzina, a candy similar to Turkish lukum, made from ground fruits.
- Mann al-sama, an Iranian nougat that originated in Isfahan.
- Qatayef, an Arab dessert reserved for the Muslim holiday of Ramadan, a sort of sweet crêpe filled with cheese or nuts. It was traditionally prepared by street vendors as well as households in the Levant and more recently has spread to Egypt.
- Zardah, a Persian dessert. It is also used on religious occasions, such as Ramadan and Eid. It is made of soaked rice with a sticky consistency like jelly, with sugar and yellow tea dye added to it, along with cinnamon, coconut and nuts to decorate the dish.

== Beverages ==
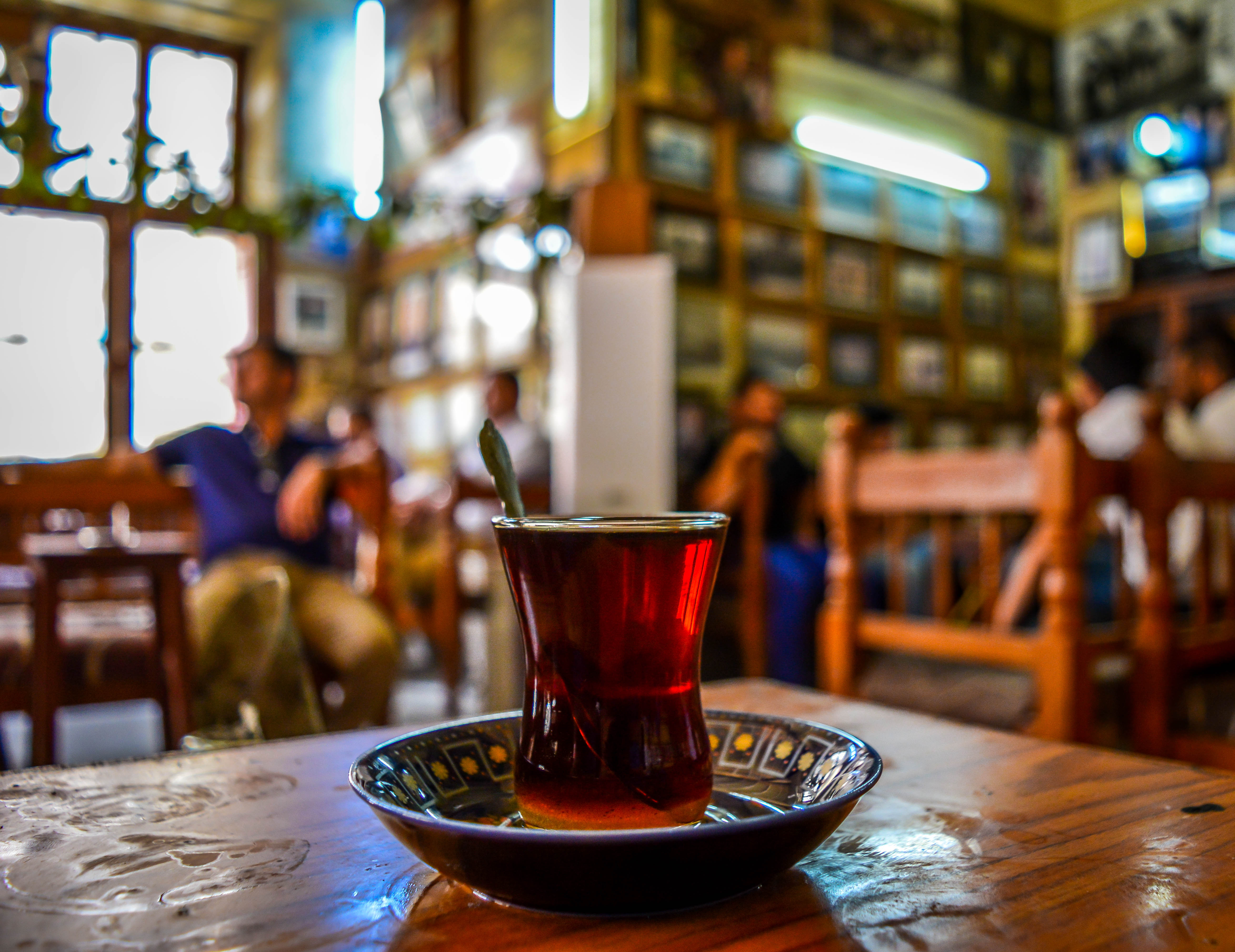
Iraqi tea served at the Shabandar Café, Baghdad

=== Alcoholic beverages ===
On February 20, 2023, a law was published banning the import, production and sale of all types of alcoholic beverages, punishable by fines of up to IQD 25 million. There is currently no further information available regarding the enforcement of the law, which is currently being litigated.

- Arak, a clear, colourless, unsweetened anise-flavoured distilled alcoholic drink. Arak is usually not consumed straight, but is mixed in approximately 1/3︎ arak to 2/3︎ water, and ice is then added.
- Beer, a drink that originated in ancient Assyria and Babylon over 6,000 years ago.
- Cusa Masqool, an alcoholic drink which is made from fermented goats milk. It is mostly only found in the Kurdistan region and dates back to antiquity.

=== Non-alcoholic beverages ===
- Arabic coffee, a drink that has a strong and bitter taste, a popular beverage in Iraq.
- Sharbat, a chilled, sweet drink prepared from fruit juice or flower petals.
- Laban, a cold beverage of yogurt mixed with cold water, sometimes with a pinch of salt or dried mint added.
- Tea, also known as chai, is widely consumed throughout the day, especially in the mornings, after meals, and during social settings. It is prepared in a special way involving boiling tea in hot water, then placing it over a second tea pot with boiling water to let the tea infuse.

== See also ==
- Coffeehouse culture of Baghdad
- Culture of Iraq
- Mesopotamia
- Masgouf
- Chelfray
- Kleicha
- Lokma
- Samoon
- Quzi
- Tandoor bread
- Ibn Sayyar al-Warraq

=== Related cuisines ===
- Arab cuisine
- Armenian cuisine
- Assyrian cuisine
- Azerbaijani cuisine
- Central Asian cuisine
- Iranian cuisine
- Levantine cuisine
- List of dishes from the Caucasus
- Mediterranean cuisine
- Middle Eastern cuisine
- Turkish cuisine

== Bibliography ==
- Linda Dangoor, Flavours of Babylon, Waterpoint Press, 2014 (ISBN 978-0-9567325-1-4)
- Lamees Ibrahim, The Iraqi Cookbook, Stacey International, 2011 (ISBN 978-1-905299-54-6).
- ʻAlī Akbar Mahdī, (2003) Teen life in the Middle East, Greenwood Publishing Group, p. 40 -41 ISBN 0-313-31893-X
- Jacob, Jeanne; Ashkenazi, Michael. (2007) The World Cookbook for Students, Greenwood Publishing Group p. 1 - 5 ISBN 0-313-33455-2
- Maurice Mashaal, Saveurs de Bagdad.- À la table des juifs d'Iraq, Diastatops, 2025 (ISBN 978-2-9598135-0-4).
- Nasrallah, Nawal (2003) Delights from the Garden of Eden: A Cookbook and a History of the Iraqi Cuisine, 1stBooks, ISBN 1-4033-4793-X
