= Quzi =

Roasted goat or lamb dish popular in the Arab world

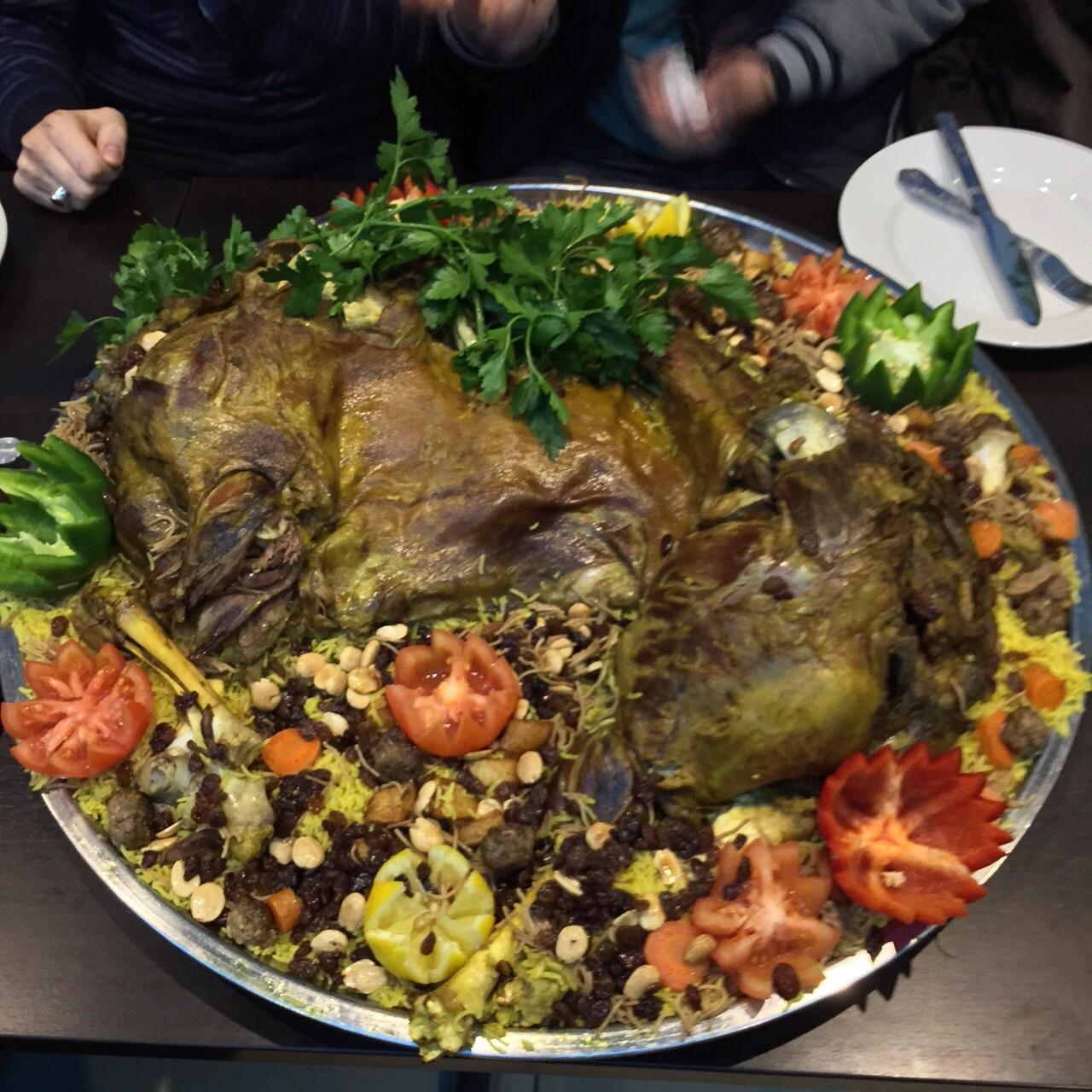
- Iraqi quzi
- Alternative names: Quzi, Qoozi, Ghuzi, Ghoozi
- Course: Meal
- Place of origin: Iraq United Arab Emirates Oman
- Region or state: Middle East, Persian Gulf and North Africa
- Associated cuisine: Iraqi cuisine
- Created by: Iraqis
- Main ingredients: Lamb, rice, roasted nuts and raisins

Quzi (Arabic: قوزي), also spelled as qoozi or ghoozi, is a popular rice-based dish and is considered one of Iraq's national dishes. It is served with very slowly cooked lamb, roasted nuts, and raisins served over rice. The dish can also be found in some Arab states of the Persian Gulf.

== Etymology ==
The Arabic word quzi (Arabic: قوزي) comes from Turkish kuzu (Ottoman Turkish: قوزی) meaning 'lamb'. Different pronunciations and spellings are used across the Arab world, common ones include quzi, ouzi (أوزي), qouzi, or ghoozi.

Quzi originally referred to a dish made of lamb stuffed with rice and ground meat, but now refers to a variety of dishes with similar ingredients. For example, some chicken and rice dishes are referred to as quzi.

== History ==
British lexicographer James Redhouse described qoozi (Ottoman Turkish: قوزى) in his 1890 Ottoman Turkish to English dictionary as "A lamb stuffed and roasted whole"

== Variations ==
In Iraqi cuisine, it is usually prepared by stuffing a whole lamb with rice, vegetables, spices and nuts and slow-cooking it over a closed or submerged oven. In some places in the Middle East it is buried in a pit containing burning coal or charcoal to get the smoky flavor.

There are many variations to this technique such as in Saudi Arabia and Yemen, where it is called madfoon, cooked by being wrapped in aluminium foil and kept on an open heat source. In Oman and UAE it is called shuwaa and is traditionally eaten on festive occasions, prepared by wrapping the marinated meat in date palm leaves and placing the wrapped meat in a submerged oven.

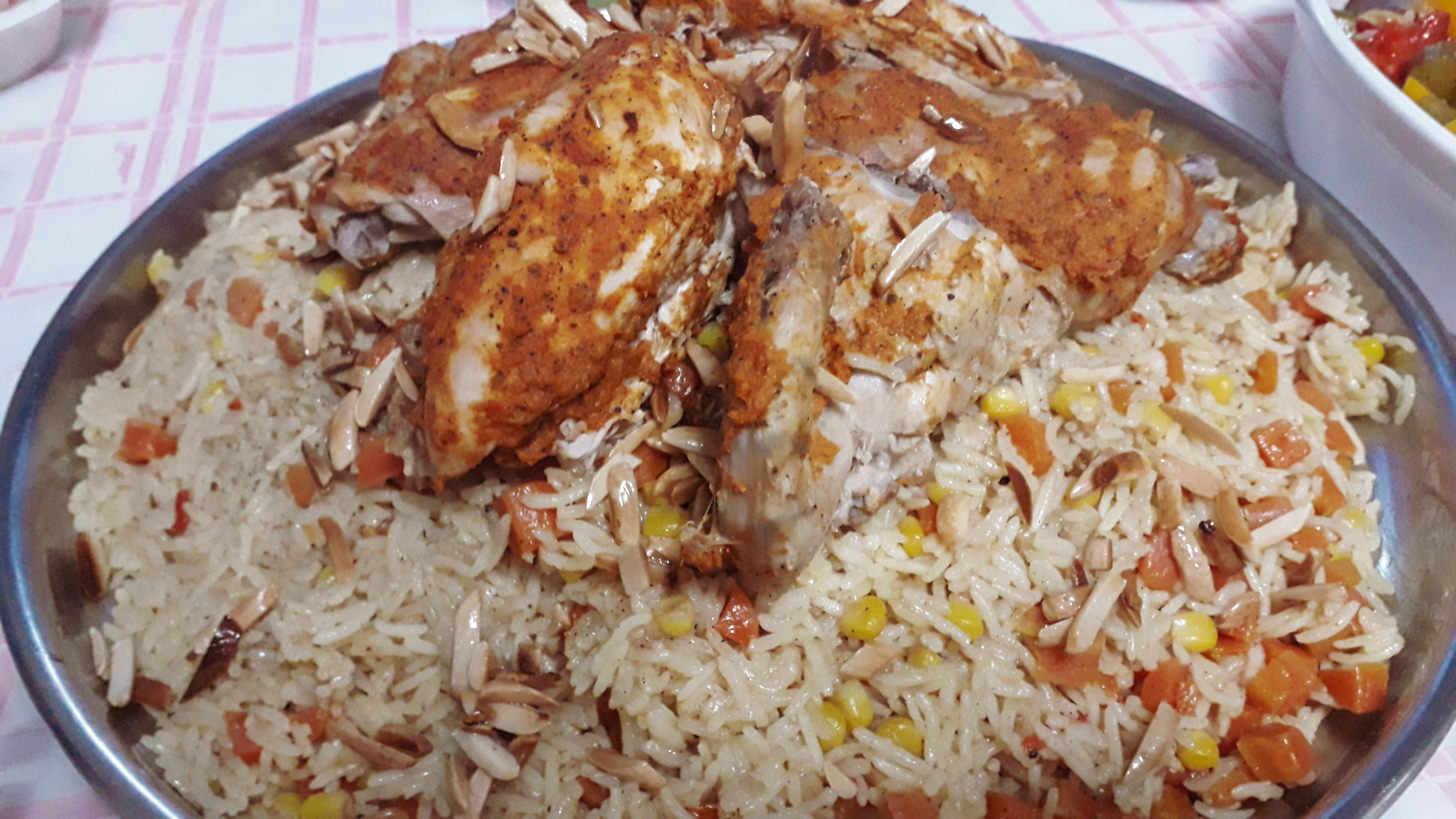
Levantine ouzi, made with carrots, peas, and chicken.

In Jordan, and Syria it is known as zarb; the meat is portioned into smaller pieces and kept along with vegetables and bread dough so that the flavors are enhanced. Some versions in the Levant use chicken next to or in place of lamb.

Another version popular in Jordan and Syria uses ground lamb meat instead of whole lamb, sometimes presented as a pilaf with carrots and peas, originally, this was used as the filling for surar ouzi (Levantine Arabic: صرر أوزي, lit. 'ouzi pouches'), which are parcels of thin dough that are stuffed and baked, but contemporary versions call the stuffing itself "ouzi". It is especially popular in Syria, and often served for special occasions like weddings or to guests. Traditionally, surar ouzi was a popular way to package food for people "on the go" such as the nomadic bedouins.

Another variant is called haneeth where it is cooked inside a hot tabun; this variation can be found in most Middle Eastern countries as well as the Horn of Africa and North Africa.

== See also ==
- Mesopotamian cuisine
- Arab cuisine
- Levantine cuisine
- List of lamb dishes
- List of rice dishes
