= Chelfray =

Iraqi stew

- Type: Stew
- Place of origin: Mesopotamia
- Region or state: South Caucasus, Eastern Mediterranean
- Serving temperature: Hot
- Main ingredients: Lamb meat, potato, spices, tomato

Chelfray is an Iraqi stew consisting of lamb meat cut into cubes, potatoes, tomatoes, diced green bell pepper and hot pepper, salt and black pepper to taste and other mixed spices, all mixed together over a low heat.

== See also ==
- Mesopotamian cuisine
- Culture of Iraq
- List of stews
