= Masgouf =

Iraqi national dish

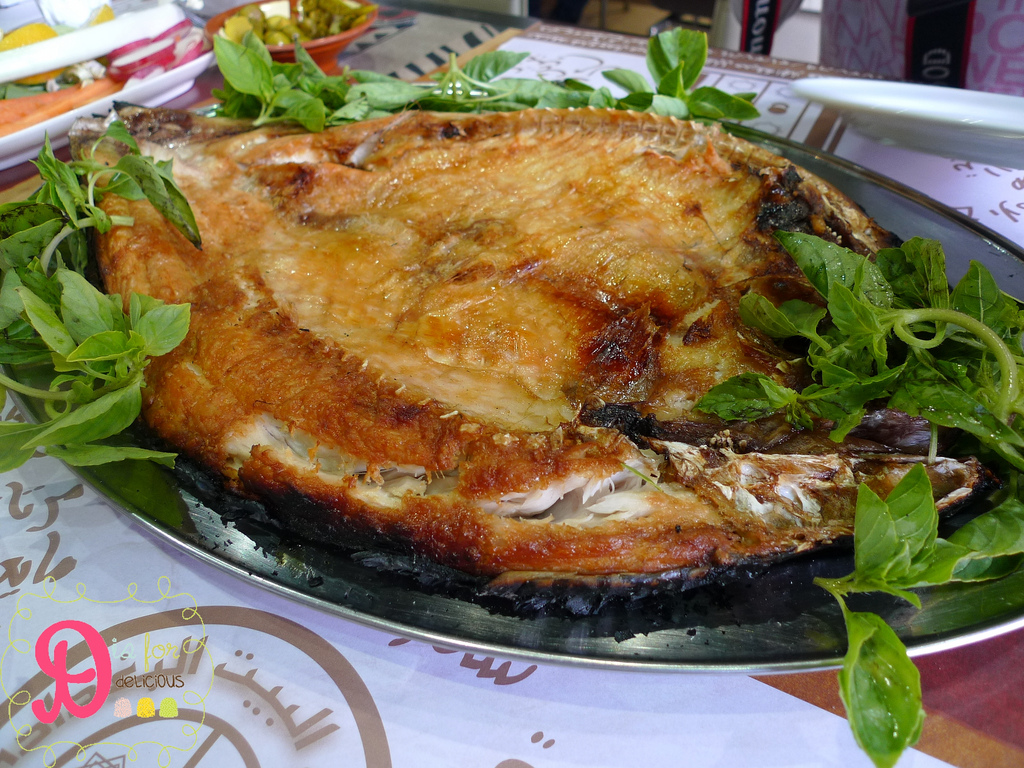
- A prepared masgouf
- Course: Main course
- Place of origin: Iraq (Mesopotamia)
- Region or state: Baghdad, Basra and Tigris River
- Associated cuisine: Iraq
- Created by: Iraqis
- Serving temperature: Hot
- Main ingredients: Large freshwater carps and barbs from the Tigris-Euphrates Basin
- Variations: Northern Iraqi variation, in a clay oven

Masgouf (Arabic: المسكوف), is a Mesopotamian dish consisting of seasoned, grilled carp; it is often considered the national dish of Iraq.

== Geographical distribution ==
Outside of Iraq, masgouf is found in Damascus due to a high number of Iraqis who lived there after the 2003 invasion of Iraq.

== See also ==
- Iraqi cuisine
- Middle Eastern cuisine

== Notes ==
Masgouf arguably being the most famous dish of Iraq, it is also the one that is always the foremost served to foreign delegations visiting the country by the Iraqi statesmen. Two notable admirers of this dish are said to be the former President of France, Jacques Chirac and Vladimir Zhirinovsky, the former chairman of the Russian Duma. Chirac apparently fell for masgûf during a visit to Iraq in a formal dinner given to his honor by Saddam Hussein.

== Gallery ==
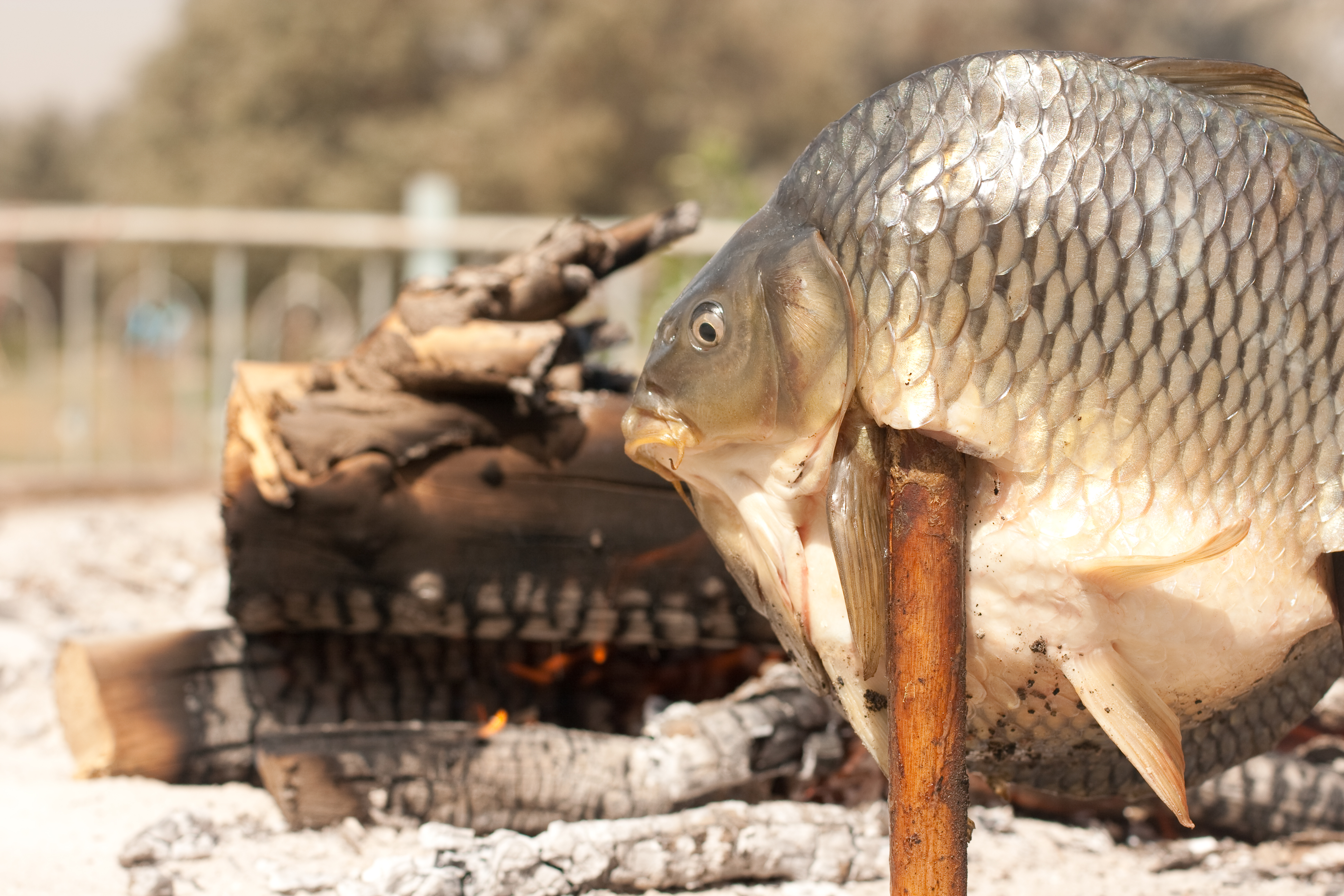
A carp on a stick

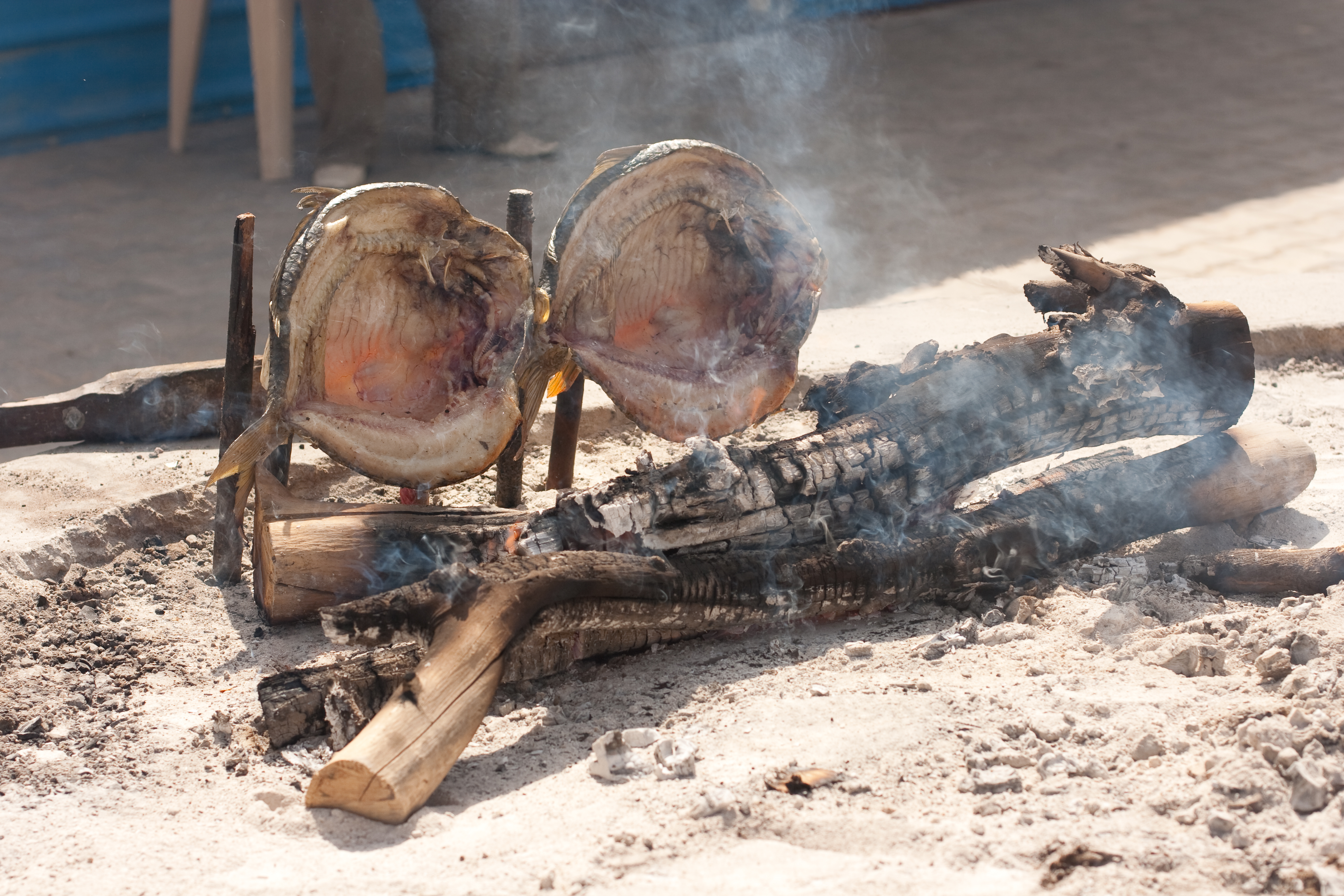
Carps grilled into masgouf

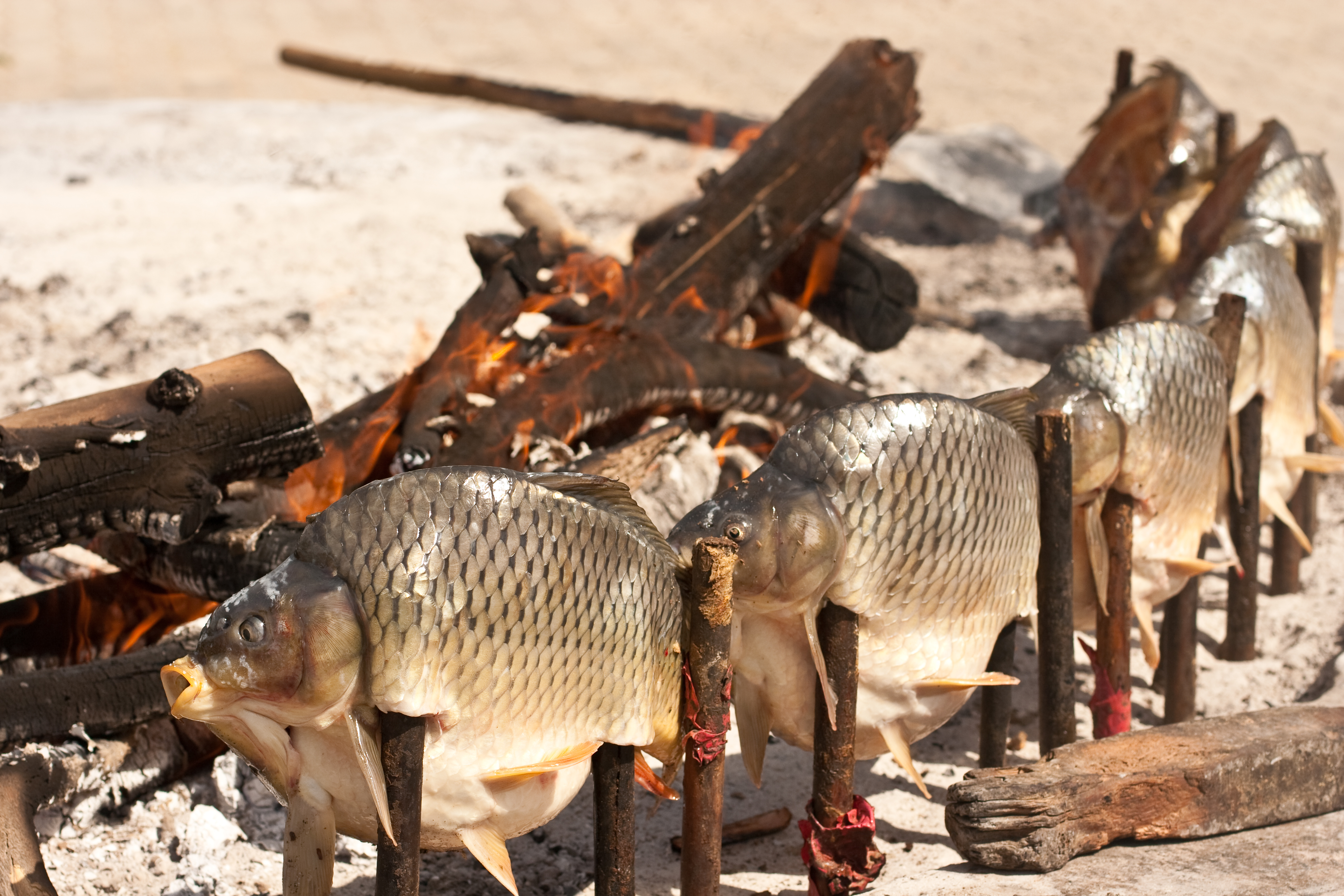
Multiple carps being grilled
