= Tepsi baytinijan =

Iraqi eggplant dish

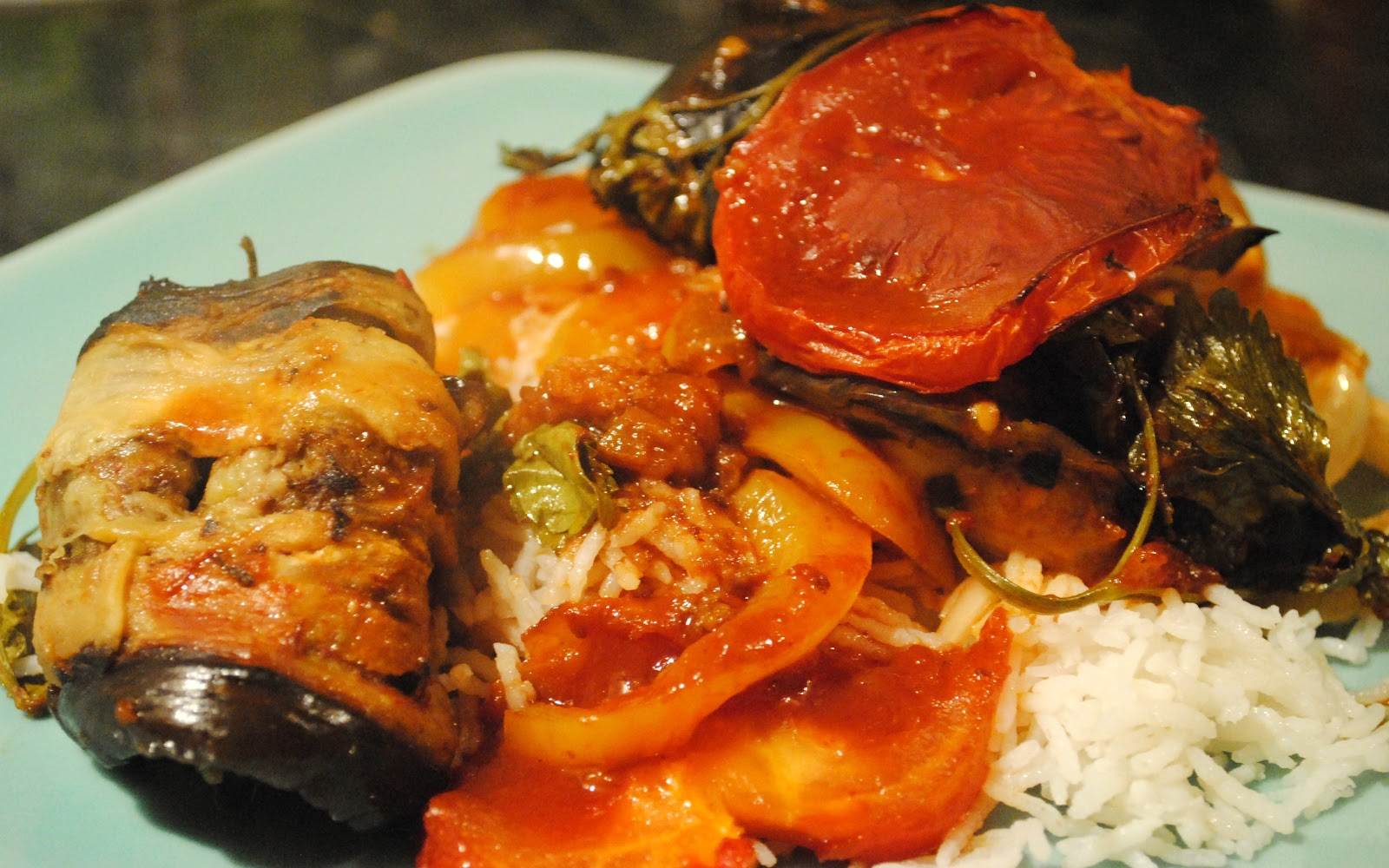
- Alternative names: Tepsi, tebsi
- Type: Casserole
- Course: Main dish, side dish
- Place of origin: Iraq
- Region or state: Iraq
- Associated cuisine: Iraqi cuisine
- Created by: Iraqis
- Main ingredients: Eggplant, meatballs, tomatoes, potatoes, onions, garlic

Tepsi baytinijan (Arabic: تبسي بيتنجان, lit. 'eggplant platter') is a popular Iraqi casserole dish consisting of eggplant, sliced and fried before placing in a baking dish, accompanied with meatballs, tomatoes, onions and garlic. Potato slices are placed on top of the mixture, and the dish is baked.

Like many other Iraqi dishes, it is usually served with rice, along with salad and pickles.

== See also ==
- Patlıcanlı kebab
