= Kitab al-Tabikh =

Kitab al-Tabikh or Kitab al-Ṭabīḫ (Arabic: كتاب الطبيخ, The Book of Dishes) is the name of these medieval Arabic language cookbooks:

- Kitab al-Tabikh, written in the 10th century by Ibn Sayyar al-Warraq
- Kitab al-Tabikh, written in 1226 by Muhammad bin Hasan al-Baghdadi
- Kitāb al-ṭabīẖ, 13th-century Andalusian cookbook
